= Douglas (given name) =

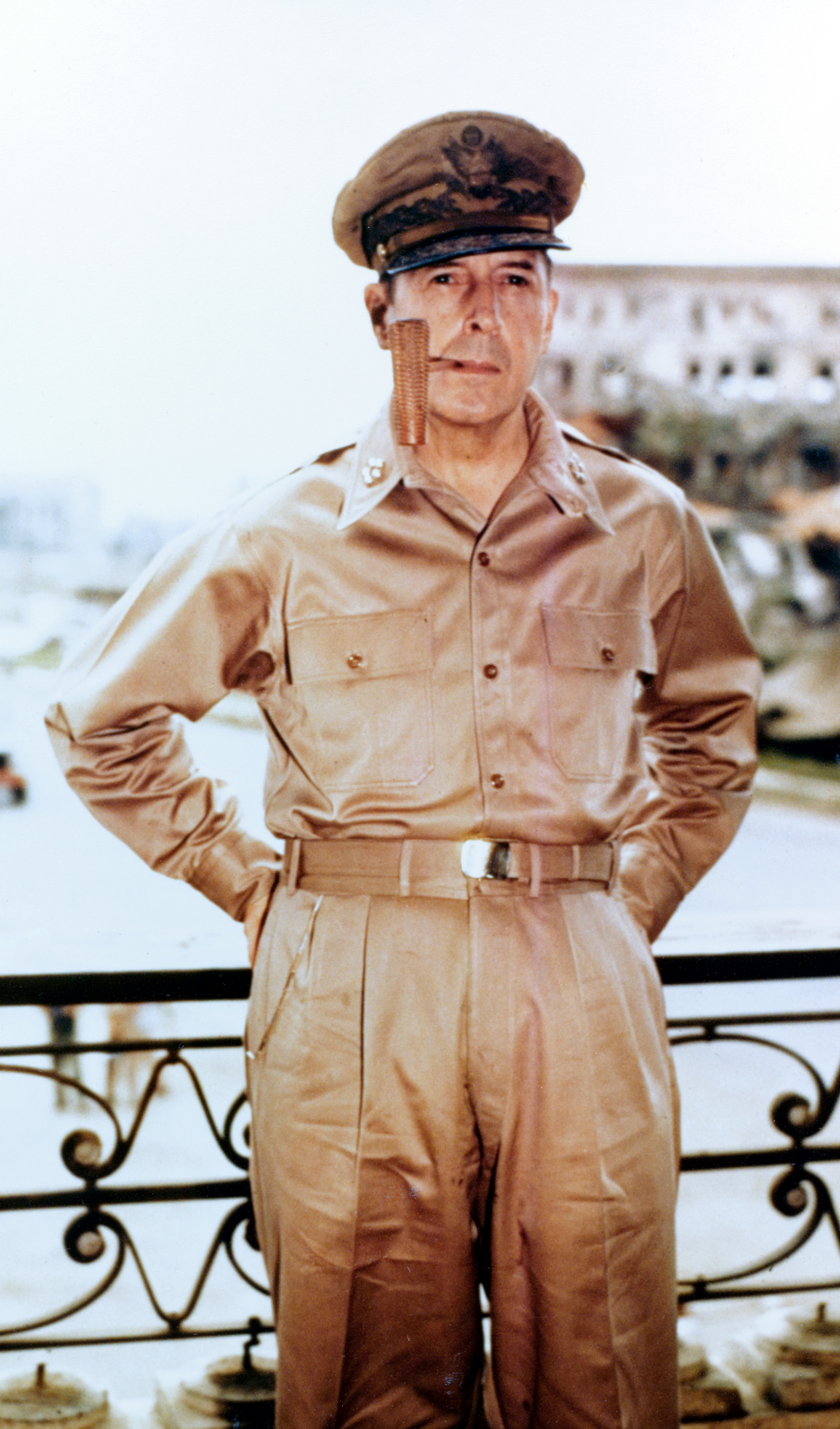
- Douglas MacArthur in 1945
- Pronunciation: /ˈdʌɡləs/ DUG-ləs
- Gender: Male

Origin
- Origin: Scottish Gaelic
- Meaning: "dark stream"
- Region of origin: South Lanarkshire, Scotland

Other names
- Related names: Nicknames: Doug, Dougie, Duggie; Variations: Douglass, Dougal, Dúghlas, Dubhghlas (Gaelic forms); Related surname: Douglas

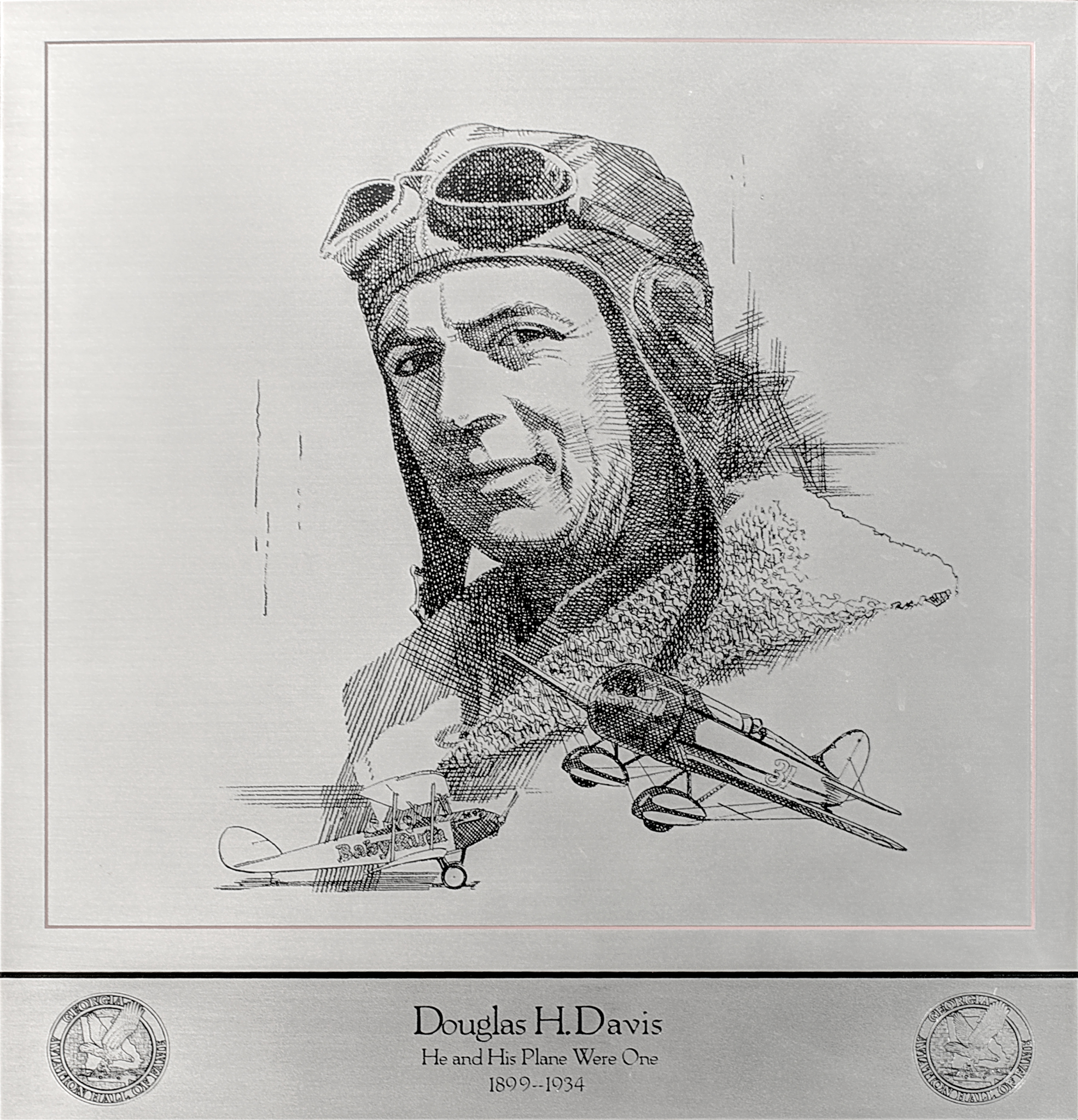
Picture of Douglas H. Davis

Douglas is a masculine given name which originated from the surname Douglas. Although today the name is almost exclusively given to boys, it was used as a woman's name in the seventeenth and eighteenth centuries in the north of England. There were three wives of Members of Parliament named Douglas during the reign of Elizabeth I (1558–1603). The Scottish surname Douglas was borne by one of the most powerful families of the Kingdom of Scotland (the Earls of Douglas, Angus, Morton, Dukes of Hamilton and others). It has sometimes been stated that the given name is connected with the given name Dougal, although it is more likely derived from the surname Douglas.

Linguistically, Douglas is derived from the Gaelic elements: dubh, meaning "dark, black"; and glas, meaning "stream" (also a derivative of glas, meaning "green"). The surname Douglas is a habitational name, which could be derived from any of the many places so-named. While there are numerous places with this name in both Ireland and Scotland, it is thought, in most cases, to refer to Douglas, South Lanarkshire, which was once the stronghold of Clan Douglas.

The Scottish Gaelic form of the given name is Dùghlas [ˈt̪uːl̪ˠəs̪]; the Irish language forms are Dúghlas and Dubhghlas, which are pronounced [ˈd̪ˠuːɣlˠəsˠ]. The Hawaiian language form of the given name is Koukalaka, which is pronounced [kowkəˈlɐkə]; a variant form of this name is Dougalasa. The given name Doug is a common short form variant of Douglas. Pet forms of the given name include Dougie and Duggie. In Scotland, while spelled Dougie like the above, there is a distinct Scottish pronunciation of "Doogie".

== Douglas ==
=== Mononyms ===
- Douglas (footballer, born 1963) (William Douglas Humia Menezes), Brazilian footballer
- Douglas (footballer, born 1982) (Douglas dos Santos), Brazilian footballer
- Douglas (footballer, born March 1983) (Douglas Renato de Jesus), Brazilian footballer
- Douglas (footballer, born December 1983) (Douglas David Fernandes), Brazilian footballer
- Douglas (footballer, born 1985) (Douglas Marques dos Santos), Brazilian footballer
- Douglas (footballer, born 1986) (Douglas de Oliveira), Brazilian footballer
- Douglas (footballer, born 1987) (Dyanfres Douglas Chagas Matos), Brazilian footballer
- Douglas (footballer, born 1988) (Douglas Franco Teixeira), Brazilian-Dutch footballer
- Douglas (footballer, born April 1990) (Douglas Silva Bacelar), Brazilian footballer
- Douglas (footballer, born August 1990) (Douglas Pereira dos Santos), Brazilian footballer
- Douglas (footballer, born 1995) (Douglas Matheus do Nascimento), Brazilian footballer

=== Given name ===
==== A ====
- Douglas Aagard (born 1954), American politician
- Douglas Abbott (1899–1987), Canadian politician and Supreme Court judge
- Douglas Abdell (born 1947), American sculptor
- Douglas Abner (born 1996), Brazilian footballer
- Douglas Abra (born 1947), Canadian judge
- Douglas Abraham (born 1937), American politician
- Douglas Adams (1952–2001), English writer and humourist
- Douglas Adams (cricketer) (1876–1931), American cricketer
- Douglas Adams (engineer), American engineer
- Douglas Adams (painter) (1853–1920), British painter
- Douglas J. Adams, United States Navy rear admiral
- Douglas Q. Adams (born 2000), American linguist
- Douglas Ahlstedt (1945–2023), American operatic tenor
- Douglas Aibel, American casting director
- Douglas Ainslie (1865–1948), Scottish poet, translator, critic and diplomat
- Douglas Al-Bazi (born 1972), Iraqi priest
- Douglas D. Alder (1932–2023), American historian
- Douglas Alexander (born 1967), British politician
- Douglas Alexandra (1922–2000), Australian architect
- Douglas Alkenbrack (1912–1998), Canadian politician
- Douglas Allan (1896–1967), British geologist and curator
- Douglas Allanbrook (1921–2003), American composer and nysician
- Douglas Allday (1895–1945), English cricketer and British Army officer
- Douglas Allen (philosopher) (born 1941), American academic and activist
- Douglas W. Allen (born 1960), Canadian economist
- Douglas Amador (born 1901), Brazilian Paralympic athlete
- Douglas White Ambridge (1898–1976), Canadian engineer and businessman
- Douglas K. Amdahl (1919–2010), American judge
- Douglas Anderson (Wisconsin politician) (born 1886), American politician
- Douglas A. Anderson (born 1959), American writer and editor
- Douglas Leavon Anderson (1939–2013), American educator and politician
- Douglas Anderton (born 1953), American sociologist and statistician
- Douglas Silva de Andrade (born 1985), Brazilian MMA fighter
- Douglas Anguish (born 1950), Canadian politician
- Douglas Annand (1903–1976), Australian artist
- Douglas Applegate (1928–2021), American politician
- Douglas Arant (1897–1987), American attorney
- Douglas Argent (1921–2010), British TV producer and director
- Douglas Armati (born 1950), Australian writer and researcher
- Douglas Armstrong (gymnast) (born 1996), Canadian trampoline gymnast
- Douglas Armstrong (politician) (born 1940), New Zealand engineer
- Douglas B. Armstrong (1888–1969), British philatelist
- Douglas W. Arner, Hong Kong academic
- Douglas N. Arnold (born 1954), American mathematician
- Douglas Arrowsmith, Canadian film director and writer
- Douglas Asiedu, Ghanaian police officer
- Douglas Assis (born 1985), Brazilian footballer
- Douglas Augusto (born 1997), Brazilian footballer
- Douglas Aurélio (born 1999), Brazilian footballer
- Douglas Aziz (born 1942), Iraqi footballer

==== B ====
- Douglas Bader (1910–1982), British World War II flying ace
- Douglas Baggio (born 1995), Brazilian footballer
- Douglas Rivers Bagnall (1918–2001), New Zealand-born officer in the RAF
- Douglas Bahr, American judge
- Douglas Baily (born 1937), American lawyer
- Douglas Baird (born 1953), American legal scholar
- Douglas Baird (Indian Army officer) (1877–1963), British Indian Army general
- Douglas Baker (aviator) (1921–1944), American military aviator
- Douglas Baptista (born 1962), Brazilian serial killer
- Douglas Barber, Canadian businessman
- Douglas Hall, 14th Baronet (1909–2004), British colonial governor
- Douglas Barr (born 1949), American actor, writer, and director
- Douglas Barr (cricketer) (born 1935), Scottish cricketer
- Douglas Barrett (1917–1992), Keeper of Indian Art at the British Museum
- Douglas J. Barrett, American academic
- Douglas Barrow (born 1951), British politician
- Douglas Bartles-Smith (1937–2014), British Anglican priest
- Douglas Bassett (geologist) (1927–2009), Welsh geologist
- Douglas Bassett (media executive) (born 1940), Canadian media executive
- Douglas Baulch (1917-1996), Australian artist
- Douglas Stephen Bax, South African clergyman, author and activist
- Douglas Baylis (1915–1971), American landscape architect
- Douglas Carter Beane (born 1959), American playwright and screenwriter
- Douglas Beanland (1893–1963), British Army general
- Douglas Becker, American dancer
- Douglas Beckett (born 1959), English cricketer
- Douglas Walter Belcher (1889–1953), Recipient of the Victoria Cross
- Douglas Belchior (born 1978), Brazilian teacher and activist
- Douglas Bell (athlete) (1908–1944), English discus thrower
- Douglas Bell (politician) (1926–2021), Canadian politician
- Douglas John Bell (1893–1918), South African World War I flying ace
- George Douglas Hutton Bell (1905–1993), English plant breeder
- Douglas Bennett (canoeist) (1918–2008), Canadian canoeist
- Douglas Bennett (cricketer, born 1886) (1886–1982), South African cricketer
- Douglas Bennett (cricketer, born 1912) (1912–1984), South African cricketer
- Douglas C. Bennett (born 1946), American academic administrator
- Douglas Bentham (born 1947), Canadian artist
- Douglas G. Bergeron (born 1960), American businessman
- Douglas Berneville-Claye (1917–1975), British Nazi collaborator
- Douglas Bernheim (born 1958), American professor of economics
- Douglas Somerville Bertram (1913–1988), medical entomologist
- Douglas Biklen (born 1945), American educator
- Douglas Binnie (1890–1969), New Zealand cricketer
- Douglas Birks (1919–2004), English cricketer
- Douglas Bischoff (1926–1991), American politician
- Douglas Robertson Bisset (1908–2000), Scottish sculptor
- Douglas Black (physician) (1913–2002), Scottish physician and scientist
- Douglas Black (publisher) (1895–1977), American lawyer
- Douglas Blackburn (1857–1929), English journalist and novelist
- Douglas A. Blackmon (born 1964), American writer and journalist
- Douglas Blackwell (1924–2009), English actor
- Douglas Blackwell (bishop), Canadian Anglican bishop
- Douglas Blackwood (1909–1997), RAF officer
- Douglas Bland (born 1941), Canadian writer
- Douglas Blayney, American academic
- Douglas Blazek (born 1941), Polish-American poet and editor
- Douglas Bliss (1900–1984), Scottish painter and art conservationist
- Douglas Blubaugh (1934–2011), American wrestler and coach
- Douglas Bomeisler (1892–1953), American football player
- Douglas Bond (born 1958), American author
- Douglas Booth (born 1992), British actor
- Douglas Allen Booth (born 1949), British-American producer and writer
- Douglas Leonard Booth (1889–1956), British architect
- Douglas Borel (born 2002), Brazilian footballer
- Douglas Borges (born 1990), Brazilian footballer
- Douglas H. Bosco (born 1946), American politician
- Douglas Bostock (born 1955), English conductor
- Douglas Botting (1934–2018), English explorer, writer, and TV presenter
- Douglas Bourgeois (born 1951), American sculptor and painter
- Douglas Bowie (born 1944), Canadian playwright and screenwriter
- Douglas Boyd (born 1959), British oboist and conductor
- Douglas A. Boyd (born 1970), American historian
- Douglas Boyle (1923–2001), Royal Canadian Navy officer
- Douglas Bracewell (born 1953), New Zealand cricketer
- Douglas Bradburn (born 1972), American historian and author
- Douglas Bradshaw (1912–1996), Canadian Air Force officer
- Douglas Brand (born 1951), British criminologist
- Douglas M. Branson (born 1943), American law professor
- Douglas Bravo (1932–2021), Venezuelan politician
- Douglas Breeden, American financial economist
- Douglas Brei (born 1964), American sports executive
- Douglas Breton (1883–1953), Canadian politician
- Douglas Brewer (1925–2018), Welsh experimental physicist
- Douglas Brinkley (born 1960), American historian
- Douglas Neil Brodie (1872–1954), Canadian politician and businessman
- Douglas Bronston (1887–1951), American screenwriter
- Douglas A. Brook (born 1944), American government official
- Douglas A. Brooks (1956–2009), American Shakespeare scholar
- Douglas Brose (born 1985), Brazilian karateka
- Douglas Brown (cricketer) (born 1972), Jamaican-born cricketer
- Douglas M. Brown, American businessman and politician
- Douglas Browning (born 1929), American philosopher
- Douglas Brownrigg (1886–1946), British Army general
- Douglas Bruce (born 1949), American politician and activist
- Douglas Brunt (born 1971), American novelist and businessman
- Douglas Bruster (born 1963), American literary critic
- Douglas Lee Brutlag (born 1946), American molecular biologist
- Douglas K. Bryant (born 1949), American politician
- Douglas Brymner (1823–1902), Canadian civil servant
- Douglas Buck (born 1901), American film director
- Douglas Bullis, American author
- Douglas Burgess (born 1977), American historian
- Douglas Burrows (1915–1982), Australian stockbroker and businessman
- Douglas Isaac Busch (born 1951), American photographer and inventor
- Douglas Bush (1896–1983), American literary critic
- Douglas Busk (1906–1990), British diplomat and mountaineer
- Douglas Butcher (1876–1945), English cricketer
- Douglas Buxton (1917–1984), Australian sailor
- Douglas Byng (1893–1987), English comic singer and songwriter

==== C ====
- Douglas Caddy (born 1938), American attorney
- Douglas Caé (born 1987), Brazilian footballer
- Douglas Caetano (born 1981), Brazilian footballer
- Douglas Cagas (1944–2021), Philippine politician
- Douglas Cairns (born 1961), British classicist
- Douglas Cambridge (1941–2005), Vincentian cricketer
- Douglas Cameron (bishop) (born 1935), Scottish Anglican bishop
- Douglas Cameron (broadcaster) (born 1933), British broadcaster
- Douglas Cameron (cricketer) (1903–1996), New Zealand cricketer
- Douglas Cameron (politician) (1854–1921), Canadian politician
- Douglas Cameron (RAF officer) (born 1893), British flying ace
- Douglas Camfield (1931–1984), British television director
- Douglas Camilo (born 1990), Brazilian footballer
- Douglas Campbell (actor) (1922–2009), Canadian actor
- Douglas Campbell (aviator) (1896–1990), American World War I flying ace
- Douglas Campbell (British Army officer) (1899–1980), British Army general
- Douglas Campbell (soil conservator) (1906–1969), New Zealand soil conservator
- Douglas Campbell (swimmer) (born 1960), British swimmer
- Douglas Graham Campbell (1867–1918), British colonial officer
- Douglas Houghton Campbell (1859–1953), American botanist
- Douglas Lloyd Campbell (1895–1995), Premier of Manitoba 1948–58
- Douglas Munro Campbell (1889–1986), Canadian politician
- Douglas R. Campbell (born 1945), Canadian judge
- Douglas Carbery (1894–1959), British army officer during WW1 and WW2
- Douglas Cardinal (born 1934), Canadian architect
- Douglas Carey (1876–1947), Anglican priest
- Douglas Carnegie (1870–1937), British politician
- Douglas Carr (1872–1950), English cricketer
- Douglas Carroll, American politician
- Douglas Carruthers (1882–1962), English explorer and cartographer
- Douglas Carswell (born 1971), British politician
- Douglas Carter (1908–1988), New Zealand politician
- Douglas F. Carter (1944–2001), American politician
- Douglas Cartland (table tennis) (1914–2002), American table tennis player
- Douglas L. Carver (born 1951), United States Army general
- Douglas Cashion (1907–2004), Australian politician
- Douglas R. Cassel (1845–1875), American naval officer
- Douglas Caston (1917–1996), Canadian politician
- Douglas Cavener, American biologist
- Douglas Edward Cayley (1870–1951), British Army general
- Douglas Cedeño (born 1960), Venezuelan footballer
- Douglas Century (born 1964), Canadian journalist and writer
- Douglas H. Chadwick (born 1948), American wildlife biologist and photographer
- Douglas Chaffee (1936–2011), American artist
- Douglas Chalmers (born 1966), British Army general
- Douglas Chalmers (politician) (born 1957), British politician
- Douglas Chamberlain (1931–2025), British cardiologist
- Douglas Chandler (1889–1976), American journalist and Nazi propagandist
- Douglas Chandor (1897–1953), American painter
- Douglas Chapman (politician) (born 1955), Scottish SNP politician
- Douglas Chiarotti (born 1970), Brazilian volleyball player
- Douglas Church, American football coach
- Douglas Churchill (1948–2021), Australian judoka
- Douglas Cifu, American businessman
- Douglas Cines (born 1953), American physician
- Douglas Clague (1917–1981), British businessman
- Douglas Clark (poet) (1942–2010), English poet
- Douglas Clark (rugby league) (1891–1951), English sportsperson
- Douglas Clark (sculptor), American sculptor
- Douglas Alan Clark (1917–2012), US naval aviator
- Douglas S. Clark (born 1957), American chemical engineer
- Douglas Clarke (conductor) (1893–1962), British conductor
- Douglas Clarke (English cricketer) (born 1948), English cricketer
- Douglas Clarke (New Zealand cricketer) (1932–2005), New Zealand cricketer
- Douglas Clavering (1794–1827), British naval officer and explorer
- Douglas Clegg (born 1958), American writer
- Douglas Clements (born 1950), American scholar
- Douglas Cleverdon (1903–1987), English radio producer
- Douglas Cliggott (born 1958), American economist
- Douglas Cobo (born 1987), Brazilian footballer
- Douglas Cockerell (1870–1945), British bookbinder
- Douglas Coe (1928–2017), American evangelical
- Douglas Coghill (1855–1928), British politician
- Douglas J. Cohen (born 1958), Composer and lyricist
- Douglas Cole (historian) (1938–1998), American-Canadian historian
- Douglas R. Cole (born 1964), American judge
- Douglas Coleman III (born 1998), American gridiron football player
- Douglas L. Coleman (1931–2014), Canadian-American physiologist and biochemist
- Douglas Collard (born 1952), English cricketer
- Douglas Collier (born 1901), American Paralympic athlete
- Douglas Colyer (1893–1978), Royal Air Force commander
- Douglas Comer (born 1949), American computer scientist
- Douglas Conant (born 1951), American businessman
- Douglas Connell (born 1954), British lawyer
- Douglas W. Connellee (died 1984), American politician
- Douglas Consiglio (born 1964), Canadian middle-distance runner
- Douglas S. Cook (1958–2015), American screenwriter
- Douglas Cooke (1879–1949), English politician
- Douglas Graham Cooke (1895–1955), British flying ace
- Douglas Cooper (art historian) (1911–1984), British art historian
- Douglas Anthony Cooper (born 1960), Canadian writer
- Douglas H. Cooper (1815–1879), American politician
- Douglas Percival Cooper (1875–1950), British cinematographer
- Douglas Copland (1894–1971), Australian academic and economist
- Douglas Harold Copp (1915–1998), Canadian scientist
- Douglas S. Coppinger, U.S. Air Force general
- Douglas Cordier (born 1953), American politician
- Douglas Cordner (1887–1946), Irish cricketer
- Douglas Corleone (born 1975), American novelist
- Douglas Corrance (born 1947), Scottish photographer
- Douglas Corrigan (1907–1995), American aviator
- Douglas I. Cosman (born 1938), Canadian politician
- Douglas Costa (born 1990), Brazilian footballer
- Douglas M. Costle (1939–2019), American lawyer
- Douglas Coupland (born 1961), Canadian writer and graphic designer
- Douglas Court (1933–2019), Canadian figure skater
- Douglas Coutinho (born 1994), Brazilian footballer
- Douglas Covington (1935–2012), American educator
- Douglas E. Cowan (born 1958), Canadian academic
- Douglas Coward (1915–1978), British trade union leader
- Douglas Cowper (1817–1839), British painter
- Douglas Cox (luthier) (born 1948), American violin maker
- Douglas Cox (American football) (1923–2011), American football player and coach
- Douglas Cox (cricketer) (1919–1982), Australian cricketer
- Douglas Crabbe (born 1947), Australian murderer
- Douglas Craig (1929–2025), British football chairman
- Douglas S. Cramer (1931–2021), American television producer
- Douglas Crase (born 1944), American poet, essayist, and critic
- Douglas Crawford (1939–2002), Scottish politician and journalist
- Douglas Creighton (1928–2004), Canadian journalist
- Douglas Cresswell (1894–1960), New Zealand author, historian, and broadcaster
- Douglas Crick (1885–1973), English Anglican bishop
- Douglas Crimp (1944–2019), American philosopher and gender theorist
- Douglas Crise (born 1961), American film editor
- Douglas Crockford (born 1955), American computer programmer
- Douglas Croft (1926–1963), American actor
- Douglas Crofut (1942–1981), American radiographer
- Douglas Allen, Baron Croham (1917–2011), British politician and civil servant
- Douglas Crooks (1872–1930), South African cricketer
- Douglas Crosby (born 1949), Canadian prelate
- Douglas Cross (1892–1970), Australian politician
- Douglas James Smyth Crozier (1908–1976), Irish teacher and civil servant
- Douglas Cruz (born 1998), Brazilian footballer
- Douglas Csima (born 1985), Canadian rower
- Douglas Cumming (born 1970), Canadian financial economist
- Douglas Cummings (1946–2014), British cellist
- Douglas Cunningham (American football) (born 1955), American football player
- Douglas Gordon Cunningham (1908–1992), Canadian lawyer and soldier
- Douglas Cunnington (1885–1973), Canadian politician
- Douglas J. Cuomo (born 1958), American classical composer

==== D ====
- Douglas Daft (born 1943), Australian businessman
- Douglas Dakin (1907–1995), British historian
- Douglas Dalton (1913–1995), Rugby player
- Douglas Darby (1910–1985), Australian politician
- Douglas Darden (1951–1996), American architectural designer
- Douglas Dare (born 1990), Musical artist
- Douglas Darling (1914–1978), British Army general
- Douglas Daveta, Fiji rugby sevens player
- Douglas David (born 1957), American painter
- Douglas Davies (born 1947), Welsh theologian and anthropologist
- Douglas Davies (cricketer) (1881–1949), South African cricketer
- Douglas Arthur Davies (1896–1954), British flying ace
- Douglas Davis (artist) (1933–2014), American artist
- Douglas Dawson (1854–1933), British Army World War I general
- Douglas Day (1932–2004), American novelist and biographer
- Douglas Dayton (1924–2013), American businessman
- Douglas Dean, American state legislator
- Douglas Dedge (1966–1998), American mixed martial artist
- Douglas DeGood (1947–2019), American politician
- Douglas Denoff (born 1957), American theater producer
- Douglas Dent (1869–1959), British Royal Navy officer
- Douglas K. Detterman (born 1942), American psychologist
- Douglas Dettmer (born 1964), American totton
- Douglas Devananda (born 1957), Sri Lankan politician
- Douglas Dewar (1875–1957), British civil servant
- Douglas Dexter (1889–1937), British fencer
- Douglas Diamond (born 1953), American economist
- Douglas Dias (born 1993), Brazilian footballer
- Douglas Dick (1920–2015), American actor
- Douglas Dick (footballer) (1868–1940), Scottish footballer
- Douglas E. Dickey (1946–1967), U.S. Marine Corps Medal of Honor recipient
- Douglas Dickinson (1886–1949), British Army general
- Douglas Dockery, American epidemiologist
- Douglas Dodds-Parker (1909–2006), British politician
- Douglas Dodson (1921–1982), American horse trainer and jockey
- Douglas Dold (1895–1980), South African cricketer
- Douglas Dollarhide (1923–2008), American politician
- Douglas Domenech (born 1955), American politician
- Douglas H. Dority (born 1938), American trade unionist
- Douglas L. Dorset (1942–2016), American crystallographer
- Douglas Z. Doty (1874–1935), American screenwriter
- Douglas Fitzgerald Dowd (1919–2017), American economist
- Douglas Dryburgh (born 1966), Scottish-Irish curler
- Douglas Drysdale (1915–1984), Scottish nationalist
- Douglas Duckworth (born 1971), American academic
- Douglas Duer (1887–1964), American painter and illustrator
- Douglas Valder Duff (1901–1978), British merchant seaman
- Douglas Dumbleton (1918–2005), New Zealand cricket umpire
- Douglas Dummett (1806–1873), American politician
- Douglas Moerdyke Duncan (1902–1968), Canadian art dealer
- Douglas Cochrane, 12th Earl of Dundonald (1852–1935), British Army officer and politician
- Douglas Dunlop (1888–1922), British missionary
- Douglas Morton Dunlop (1909–1987), British orientalist
- Douglas Dunn (born 1942), Scottish poet
- Douglas Dunn (choreographer) (born 1942), American choreographer
- Douglas Durian, American researcher
- Douglas Durkin (1884–1967), Canadian writer
- Douglas Durst (born 1944), American real estate investor and developer

==== E ====
- Douglas Spotted Eagle (born 1962), Musical artist
- Douglas Easton, British epidemiologist
- Douglas J. Eboch (born 1967), American screenwriter
- Douglas Echols, American convicted and later exonerated of rape
- Douglas L. Edmonds (1887–1962), American judge
- Douglas Edmunds (1944–2020), Scottish caber toss champion
- Douglas Edwards (1917–1990), American television news anchor
- Douglas Ellington (1886–1960), American architect
- Douglas Elliot (1923–2005), Scotland international rugby union player
- Douglas Elliott (skier) (born 1950), British cross-country skier
- Douglas Hemphill Elliott (1921–1960), American politician
- Douglas Elmendorf (born 1962), American economist
- Douglas Elphinstone (1909–1995), British stockbroker
- Douglas Uggah Embas (born 1955), Malaysian politician
- Douglas Emerson (born 1974), American actor
- Douglas Emlen (born 1967), Evolutionary biologist and academic
- Douglas Emlong (1942–1980), American paleontologist
- Douglas Engelbart (1925–2013), American engineer and inventor
- Douglas Erasmus (born 1990), South African swimmer
- Douglas Erwin (born 1958), American paleontologist
- Douglas Estay (born 1992), Chilean footballer
- Douglas Ete (born 1964), Solomon Islands politician
- Douglas Evans (actor) (1904–1968), American actor
- Douglas Evans (children's author) (born 1953), American writer
- Douglas Everett (politician) (1927–2018), Canadian politician
- Douglas Everett (ice hockey) (1905–1996), American ice hockey player
- Douglas Hugh Everett (1916–2002), British chemist and academic author
- Douglas Evill (1892–1971), Royal Air Force air marshal
- Douglas Ewald (1937–2021), American politician
- Douglas Ewart (born 1946), Musical artist

==== F ====
- Douglas Fader, Canadian Cross of Valour recipient
- Douglas Fairbairn (1926–1997), American novelist
- Douglas Fairbanks (1883–1939), American actor and filmmaker
- Douglas Fairley, Lord Fairley, Scottish lawyer
- Douglas Falconer (judge) (1914–2007), English judge
- Douglas Scott Falconer (1913–2004), Scottish geneticist
- Douglas Farah (born 1957), American journalist
- Douglas Farmer (1916–1977), American football player and medical doctor
- Douglas M. Fasciale (born 1960), American judge
- Douglas Faure, South African naval officer
- Douglas Fearon (born 1942), American medical immunologist
- Douglas Feaver (1914–1997), British Anglican bishop
- Douglas Fee (born 1944), Canadian politician
- Douglas Feith (born 1953), American political official
- Douglas Ferguson (artist) (born 1951), American fashion designer
- Douglas Fernández (born 1959), Venezuelan decathlete
- Douglas Ferreira (1929–2003), British businessman
- Douglas Fielding (1946–2019), British actor
- Douglas Fisher (Royal Navy officer) (1890–1963), Royal Navy admiral
- Douglas Glenn Fisher (born 1942), Canadian politician
- Douglas H. Fisher (born 1948), American politician
- Douglas John Fisher, American Episcopal bishop
- Douglas Flint (born 1955), British banker and business executive
- Douglas Florian, American visual artist and poet
- Douglas A. Flower (1916–2009), Canadian politician
- Douglas Fogle (born 1964), American art curator
- Douglas Fonseca (born 1953), Brazilian fencer
- Douglas Foo (born 1969), Singaporean business executive and politician
- Douglas Ford (bishop) (1917–2007), Anglican bishop
- Douglas Ford (British Army officer) (1918–1943), Recipient of the George Cross
- Douglas Morey Ford (1851–1916), English lawyer and novelist
- Douglas Fordyce (born 1990), British acrobatic gymnast
- Douglas Forrest, Scottish architect
- Douglas Forrester (born 1953), American politician
- Douglas Forvis (born 1992), Nicaraguan footballer
- Douglas Foshee, American businessman
- Douglas John Foskett (1918–2004), English librarian
- Douglas A. Foster (born 1952), American historian
- Douglas Eads Foster (1875–1962), American politician
- Douglas B. Fournet (1943–1968), US Army Medal of Honor recipient
- Douglas Fowley (1911–1998), American actor
- Douglas Fox (engineer) (1840–1921), English civil engineer
- Douglas Fox (organist) (1893–1978), English pianist and organist
- Douglas I. Foy, American politician
- Douglas Frantz (born 1949), American journalist
- Douglas Fraser (1916–2008), American labor leader
- Douglas M. Fraser (born 1953), US Air Force general
- Douglas Freeman (1916–2013), English cricketer
- Douglas Southall Freeman (1886–1953), American historian and journalist
- Douglas Fregin, Canadian businessman and electrical engineer
- Douglas French (born 1944), British politician
- Douglas Frenkel, American legal academic
- Douglas Freshfield (1845–1934), British lawyer and mountaineer
- Douglas Friedrich (born 1988), Brazilian footballer
- Douglas Fry (1872–1911), Australian artist
- Douglas P. Fry (born 1953), American anthropologist
- Douglas Furber (1885–1961), British lyricist and playwright
- Douglas J. Futuyma (born 1942), American evolutionary biologist
- Douglas Fyfe (1824–1871), English cricketer

==== G ====
- Douglas Gablinske (born 1953), American politician
- Douglas Gabram, U.S. Army general
- Douglas Gage, American politician from Vermont
- Douglas Gageby (1918–2004), Irish newspaper editor
- Douglas Gain (born 1976), South African cricketer
- Douglas Gairdner (1910–1992), Scottish paediatrician
- Douglas Galbraith (1965–2018), Scottish historical novelist
- Douglas Gale (born 1950), American economist
- Douglas Galton (1822–1899), British engineer
- Douglas Gamble (1856–1934), Royal Navy Admiral
- Douglas Gamley (1924–1998), Australian composer and orchestrator
- Douglas Ganton (born 1950), Canadian sound engineer
- Douglas Garcia (born 1994), Brazilian politician
- Douglas Gardiner (1905–2001), Australian architect
- Douglas Alan Garrity, American electrical engineer
- Douglas Garth (1852–1900), British lawyer
- Douglas Gautier, Australian arts administrator
- Douglas Gawler (1860–1915), Australian lawyer and politician
- Douglas Gayeton (born 1960), American artist
- Douglas Geers (born 1968), American composer
- Douglas Geiwald (born 1971), Swedish tennis player
- Douglas George (born 1953), English footballer
- Douglas Patrick George (1943–2025), Canadian visual artist
- Douglas St George (1919–1985), New Zealand aviator and military leader
- Douglas Gerrard (1891–1950), American actor
- Douglas Gibbon (1913–1962), South African cricket umpire
- Douglas Gibson (born 1943), Canadian editor, publisher, and writer
- Douglas Gibson (politician) (1942–2025), South African attorney and politician
- Douglas Alston Gilchrist (1860–1927), Scottish agriculturalist
- Douglas Gilfillan (1865–1948), South African lawyer and botanist
- Douglas Gilmore (1903–1950), American actor
- Douglas H. Ginsburg (born 1946), American federal judge
- Douglas Glover (politician) (1908–1982), British politician
- Douglas Glover (writer) (born 1948), Canadian writer
- Douglas Godfree (1881–1929), British fencer and modern pentathlete
- Douglas Golder (born 1948), Australian field hockey player
- Douglas Goldhamer (1945–2022), American rabbi
- Douglas Golding (born 1919), South African flying ace
- Douglas E. Goldman (born 1952), American businessman
- Douglas Goldring (1887–1960), British writer
- Douglas Gomery (born 1945), Journalism professor
- Douglas Gomes (born 1990), Brazilian politician
- Douglas Goodfellow (1917–2014), New Zealand businessman
- Douglas Goodwin (1938–2024), Irish cricketer
- Douglas Gordon (born 1966), Scottish artist
- Douglas C. Gordon (1956–1998), Whitewater kayaker
- Douglas Peel Gordon (1892–1948), Australian pastoralist and politician
- Douglas Gorsline (1913–1985), American painter
- Douglas Gough (born 1941), British astronomer
- Douglas Gowan (1943–2018), English researcher on PCBs
- Douglas Gracey (1894–1964), British military officer
- Douglas Graham (British Army officer) (1893–1971), British Army general
- Douglas Grant (1885–1951), Aboriginal Australian soldier and public servant
- Douglas Gray (cricketer) (1936–2004), New Zealand cricketer
- Douglas Gray (literary scholar) (1930–2017), New Zealand medievalist
- Douglas Greasley (1926–2011), English cricketer
- Douglas Green (cricketer) (1902–1990), Australian cricketer
- Douglas Allan Green (1921–2002), Australian graphic designer
- Douglas B. Green (born 1946), American musician
- Douglas R. Green (born 1955), American immunologist
- Douglas Greenberg, American historian
- Douglas G. Greene (born 1944), American historian, editor, and author
- Douglas Greenwald (1914–1997), American economist
- Douglas Greer (1921–2016), American actor
- Douglas Grégoire (born 1996), Canadian actor
- Douglas Gresham (born 1945), American-British actor and biographer
- Douglas Gretzler (1951–1998), Executed American serial killer
- Douglas Grolli (born 1989), Brazilian footballer
- Douglas Groothuis (1957–2018), American Christian philosopher
- Douglas Guest (1916–1996), British musician
- Douglas Gunn (1841–1891), American journalist and 5th Mayor of San Diego
- Douglas Gunnels (born 1948), American politician
- Douglas Guthrie (1885–1975), Scottish doctor & historian
- Douglas Gutwein (1948–2023), American politician from Indiana

==== H ====
- Douglas Hacking, 1st Baron Hacking (1884–1950), British politician
- Douglas Robert Hadow (1846–1865), British novice mountain climber
- Douglas Håge (1898–1959), Swedish actor
- Douglas Hagerman (born 1960), American lawyer
- Douglas Hague (1926–2015), British economist
- Douglas Hahn, American prelate
- Douglas Haig (actor) (1920–2011), Actor
- Douglas Haig, 1st Earl Haig (1861–1928), British field marshal
- Douglas Hogg, 1st Viscount Hailsham (1872–1950), British politician and judge
- Douglas Haldane (1926–2012), Scottish child psychiatrist
- Douglas John Hall (1928–2025), Canadian theologian
- Douglas Kent Hall (1938–2008), American writer and photographer
- Douglas Hambidge (1927–2026), Canadian Anglican bishop
- Douglas Hamilton (1818–1892), British army officer
- Douglas Hamilton (journalist) (1947–2012), journalist
- Douglas Douglas-Hamilton, 14th Duke of Hamilton (1903–1973), Scottish aviator and politician
- Douglas Hamilton, 8th Duke of Hamilton (1756–1799), Scottish nobleman
- Douglas Hamlet, Saint Vincent and the Grenadines murderer
- Douglas Hanahan (born 1951), American biologist
- Douglas Hancey, American politician from Idaho
- Douglas Hapeman (1839–1905), American Civil War Medal of Honor recipient
- Douglas Hardcastle (1886–1915), English footballer
- Douglas Hardie (1923–2005), Scottish businessman
- Douglas Harding (1909–2007), British philosopher
- Douglas R. A. Hare (1929–2015), American biblist
- Douglas Harkness (1903–1999), Canadian politician
- Douglas Harper (born 1948), American sociologist
- Douglas Harries (1893–1972), English cricketer and military officer
- Douglas Harris (field hockey) (1966–1966), Canadian field hockey player
- Douglas N. Harris, American economist and education policy researcher
- Douglas Harrison (1903–1974), Anglican priest
- Douglas Patrick Harrison (born 2000), American chemical engineer
- Douglas Hart (born 1961), British musician
- Douglas K. Hartman, American scholar
- Douglas Hartree (1897–1958), British mathematician and physicist
- Douglas A. Hartwick (1950–2025), American diplomat
- Douglas Haskell (1899–1979), American magazine editor
- Douglas Hawkes (1893–1974), British racing driver
- Douglas Hay (1876–1967), New Zealand cricketer
- Douglas Haynes (1936–2016), Canadian artist
- Douglas Haynes (cricketer) (born 1953), Vincentian cricketer
- Douglas Hazen (1860–1937), Canadian politician
- Douglas M. Head (1930–2011), American politician
- Douglas Heath (1811–1897), British lawyer and judge
- Douglas Hedley (born 1961), British philosopher
- Douglas C. Heggie (born 1947), Scottish applied mathematician and astronomer
- Douglas Henderson (actor) (1919–1978), American actor
- Douglas Henderson (ambassador) (1914–2010), United States Ambassador to Bolivia
- Douglas Henderson (SNP politician) (1935–2006), Scottish politician
- Douglas Mackay Henderson (1927–2007), Scottish botanist
- Douglas "Duck" Henry (1890–1971), American football player, coach, and politician
- Douglas Henry (1926–2017), American politician
- Douglas Henshall (born 1965), Scottish actor
- Douglas Henson (1930–2003), English cricketer
- Douglas W. Herndon, American judge
- Douglas D. Hesse (born 1956), American professor of English and writer
- Douglas Heyes (1919–1993), American film producer
- Douglas Hickox (1929–1988), British film director
- Douglas A. Hicks (born 1967), American theologian
- Douglas Higgs (born 1951), Professor of Molecular Haematology at the University of Oxford
- Douglas Hill (1935–2007), Canadian science fiction author, editor and reviewer
- Douglas Hill (musician) (born 1946), American composer, author and horn soloist
- Douglas Woodruff Hillman (1922–2007), American judge
- Douglas Hodge (born 1960), British actor
- Douglas Hodge (businessman) (born 1957), American businessman
- Douglas Hodgkin, American political scientist and author
- Douglas Hoeft (1942–2002), American politician
- Douglas Hoelscher, American political aide
- Douglas Hofstadter (born 1945), American professor of cognitive science
- Douglas Hogarth (1927–1996), Canadian politician
- Douglas Hogg (born 1945), British politician and barrister
- Douglas Holgate, Australian illustrator
- Douglas S. Holsclaw (1898–1995), American politician
- Douglas Holtz-Eakin (born 1958), American economist
- Douglas Hondo (born 1979), Zimbabwean cricketer
- Douglas Honnold (1901–1974), Canadian-born American architect
- Douglas Hooper (1927–2010), English psychologist
- Douglas Hope (born 1944), Scottish football referee
- Douglas Edward Hopkins (1902–1992), English organist
- Douglas Horne (born 1966), Canadian politician
- Douglas Horsfall (1856–1936), English stockbroker and benefactor
- Douglas Horton (1891–1968), American minister and academic
- Douglas Van Houweling (born 1943), Internet pioneer
- Douglas How (1919–2001), Canadian journalist, magazine editor, and author
- Douglas Howard (diplomat) (1897–1987), British diplomat
- Douglas Legate Howard (1885–1936), American football player, coach, and soldier
- Douglas Hoyos (born 1990), Austrian politician
- Douglas W. Hubbard, American decision scientist
- Douglas Hubble (1900–1981), British paediatric endocrinologist
- Douglas Hudson (1905–1983), American politician
- Douglas Sang Hue (1931–2014), West Indian cricket umpire
- Douglas Huebler (1924–1997), American artist
- Douglas Huff (1931–1988), American politician
- Douglas Hulick (born 1965), American fantasy writer
- Douglas Humpherys, American pianist, educator, and adjudicator
- Douglas Hung (born 1936), Taiwanese politician
- Douglas Hunt (footballer) (1914–1989), English footballer
- Douglas I. Hunt (1937–2024), American football coach and politician
- Douglas Hurd (born 1930), English politician
- Douglas Husak (born 1948), American legal philosopher
- Douglas Hutchinson (1918–1995), British politician
- Douglas Smith Huyghue (1816–1891), Canadian and Australian writer
- Douglas Hyde (1860–1949), President of Ireland from 1938 to 1945
- Douglas Hyde (author) (1911–1996), English political journalist and writer

==== I ====
- Douglas Inman (1920–2016), American oceanographer
- Douglas Irvin-Erickson, American political scientist
- Douglas Irwin (born 1962), American economist
- Douglas Ivester (born 1947), American businessman

==== J ====
- Douglas Jabs (born 1951), American ophthalmologist
- Douglas Jackman (1902–1991), Royal Air Force Air Marshal
- Douglas Jackson (author) (born 1956), Scottish novelist
- Douglas Jackson (filmmaker) (born 1940), Canadian film director
- Douglas Jackson (rugby union) (1941–2018), Scotland rugby union player
- Douglas N. Jackson (1929–2004), Canadian psychologist
- Douglas S. Jackson (born 1954), American politician
- Douglas Jacobsen (born 1951), American religious studies scholar
- Douglas T. Jacobson (1925–2000), United States Marine Corps Medal of Honor recipient
- Douglas James-Taylor (born 2001), English footballer
- Douglas Arthur James (1925–2018), American academic and conservationist
- Douglas Jamieson, Lord Jamieson (1880–1952), Scottish Unionist politician and judge
- Douglas St. Clive Budd Jansze, Ceylonese lawyer
- Douglas Jardine (1900–1958), British cricket player and team captain
- Douglas James Jardine (1888–1946), British colonial administrator
- Douglas Jay (1907–1996), British politician
- Douglas Dias Jayasinha (1915–2006), Ceylonese cricketer and cricket administrator
- Douglas Jefferies (1884–1959), British actor
- Douglas Jemal (born 1942), American real estate developer
- Douglas Jennings (born 1966), English sculptor
- Douglas Francis Jerrold (1893–1964), British journalist and publisher
- Douglas William Jerrold (1803–1857), English dramatist and writer
- Douglas Vidal Jiménez (born 1968), Salvadoran footballer and manager
- Douglas Jimerson, American concert tenor and musicologist
- Douglas Johansson (born 1960), Swedish actor
- Douglas St. John (1928–1992), New Zealand cricketer
- Douglas Johnson (historian) (1925–2005), British historian
- Douglas H. Johnson (born 1949), American scholar
- Douglas Wilson Johnson (1878–1944), American geographer and geomorphologist
- Douglas H. Johnston (1856–1939), Governor of the Chicksaw Nation
- Douglas Johnston, Lord Johnston (1907–1985), British politician
- Douglas M. Johnston, Scottish academic and author
- Douglas Jones (mathematician) (1922–2013), British mathematician
- Douglas C. Jones (1924–1998), American novelist
- Douglas L. Jones, American academic
- Douglas W. Jones, American computer scientist
- Douglas Buchanan Jr. (1968–1998), American mass murderer
- Douglas Fairbanks Jr. (1909–2000), American actor, film producer, and U.S. Navy officer
- Douglas Jennings Jr., American politician
- Douglas M. Baker Jr. (born 1958), American businessman
- Douglas M. McBride Jr. (born 1966), American Army general
- Douglas Robinson Jr. (1855–1918), American businessman
- Douglas Jung (1924–2002), Canadian politician
- Douglas Júnior (born 1988), Brazilian-born Kazakhstani futsal player

==== K ====
- Douglas Kahn (born 1951), American-born Australian sound artist
- Douglas Kalembo (born 1960), Zambian sprinter
- Douglas Kamerow, American physician
- Douglas Kary (born 1951), American politician
- Douglas Kearney (born 1974), American poet
- Douglas Kell (born 1953), British biochemist
- Douglas Kelley (1912–1958), American physician
- Douglas Forsythe Kelley (1928–2021), Industrial designer
- Douglas Kellner (born 1943), American philosopher
- Douglas A. Kellner (born 1952), Co-Chair of the New York State Board of Elections
- Douglas F. Kelly (born 1943), American Presbyterian pastor
- Douglas Tynwald Kelly (1920–2006), Canadian politician
- Douglas Kempsell (born 1993), Scottish squash player
- Douglas Kendrew (1910–1989), Army officer & England international rugby union player
- Douglas Kennedy (actor) (1915–1973), American actor
- Douglas Kennedy (folk dancer) (1893–1988), Scottish folk musician and dancer
- Douglas Kennedy (politician) (1916–2003), Canadian politician
- Douglas Kennedy (writer) (born 1955), American novelist
- Douglas Harriman Kennedy (born 1967), American journalist
- Douglas Kenney (1946–1980), American comedy writer
- Douglas T. Kenny (1924–1996), 7th President of the University of British Columbia
- Douglas T. Kenrick (born 1948), American psychologist
- Douglas Kerr (born 1951), British writer and literary academic
- Douglas Kertland (1887–1982), Canadian coxswain and architect
- Douglas Keszler, American chemist
- Douglas Keely Kevan (1895–1968), British accountant, entomologist, and conchologist
- Douglas Khoo (born 1965), Malaysian racing driver
- Douglas Kiker (1930–1991), American journalist
- Douglas Kilburn (1813–1871), Australian photographer and daguerreotypist
- Douglas Killam (1930–2020), Canadian scholar of African literature
- Douglas Killmer (1947–2005), Musical artist
- Douglas Kim (born 1983), Korean-American poker player
- Douglas Kimbell (born 1960), American water polo player
- Douglas Eric Kimmins (1905–1985), British entomologist
- Douglas King (politician) (1877–1930), Royal Navy officer
- Douglas Kinnaird (1788–1830), English banker and politician
- Douglas Reid Kinnier (1858–1916), Royal Navy officer
- Douglas Kinsella (1932–2004), Canadian immunologist
- Douglas Kipserem (born 1987), Kenyan long-distance runner
- Douglas Kirby (1943–2012), American research scientist
- Douglas Kirkland (1934–2022), Canadian photographer
- Douglas Kanja Kirocho, Kenyan police officer
- Douglas Kmiec (born 1951), American lawyer
- Douglas Knapp (1949–2020), American cinematographer and camera operator
- Douglas Knehans (born 1957), American/Australian composer
- Douglas Knight (1921–2005), American academic
- Douglas Knoop (1883–1948), British economist
- Douglas Koch, Canadian cinematographer
- Douglas Kolk (1963–2014), American artist
- Douglas Koshland (born 1953), American biochemist
- Douglas M. Kruhm (1945–2022), U.S. Border Patrol Chief

==== L ====
- Douglas Labalmondière (1815–1893), British Army officer and senior police officer
- Douglas LaBier, American psychologist
- Douglas P. Lackey (born 1945), American philosopher and playwright
- Douglas Lain (born 1970), American novelist
- Douglas Lambert (1883–1915), England international rugby union player
- Douglas Lange, American football and track and field coach
- Douglas Lapraik (1818–1869), Hong Kong businessman
- Douglas Latchford (1931–2020), British art dealer
- Douglas Laux (1983–2025), American CIA officer
- Douglas Lavine (born 1950), American judge from Connecticut
- Douglas Law, British Lions & England international rugby union player
- Douglas Lawrence (born 1943), Australian musician
- Douglas Lawson (1890–1969), American football player and coach
- Douglas A. Lawson (born 1947), American geologist, paleontologist, and computer scientist
- Douglas Laycock (born 1948), American law professor
- Douglas Layton (born 1950), American nonprofit executive and author
- Douglas Lea (1910–1947), British experimental physicist
- Douglas Leckie (1920–2007), RAAF Pilot
- Douglas Lee (choreographer) (born 1977), British choreographer
- Douglas B. Leeds (1947–2011), American businessman
- Douglas Leedy (1938–2015), American composer, performer and music scholar
- Douglas Leffingwell (1826–1900), American politician
- Douglas Legg (1914–1989), British basketball player
- Douglas Leigh (1907–1999), American advertising executive and designer
- Douglas Leite (born 1980), Brazilian footballer
- Douglas Leiterman (1927–2012), Canadian television producer
- Douglas Lenat (1950–2023), Computer scientist and AI pioneer
- Douglas Lennox-Silva (born 1987), Puerto Rican swimmer
- Douglas Leone (born 1957), American venture capitalist
- Douglas Leopold (1944–1993), Canadian broadcaster
- Douglas LePan (1914–1998), Canadian diplomat, poet, and novelist
- Douglas Letsholathebe, Botswana politician
- Douglas Letter, American lawyer
- Douglas Lewis (art historian) (born 1938), American art historian
- Douglas Lewis (boxer) (1898–1981), Canadian boxer
- Douglas Ley (1958–2021), American politician
- Douglas Light (born 1950), American writer
- Douglas Lilburn (1915–2001), New Zealand composer
- Douglas Lilford (1908–1985), South African-born Rhodesian and Zimbabwean politician
- Douglas Lim (born 1977), Malaysian actor, comedian, and TV host
- Douglas Lima (born 1988), Brazilian mixed martial artist
- Douglas Lima (water polo) (1932–2004), Brazilian water polo player
- Douglas N. C. Lin (born 1949), American planetary scientist
- Douglas Linathan (1885–1932), English cricketer
- Douglas Little (born 1950), American historian
- Douglas Livingstone (poet) (1932–1996), South African poet
- Douglas Liyanage, Sri Lankan civil servant
- Douglas Lochhead (1922–2011), Canadian writer
- Douglas Lockhart (born 1976), Scottish cricketer
- Douglas Lockwood (1918–1980), Australian writer
- Douglas Loeffler (1932–2025), American politician
- Douglas Loftus (1917–1991), South African WWII flying ace
- Douglas Lögdal (born 1992), Swedish ice hockey player
- Douglas Long, American politician
- Douglas López (born 1998), Costa Rican footballer
- Douglas Lovelock (1923–2014), English civil servant
- Douglas Lowe (athlete) (1902–1981), British athlete
- Douglas Lowe (RAF officer) (1922–2018), Royal Air Force Air Chief Marshal
- Douglas Lowe (rugby union), Rugby player
- Douglas R. Lowy (born 1942), American cancer researcher
- Douglas Lucia (born 1963), American Catholic prelate
- Douglas Luiz (born 1998), Brazilian footballer
- Douglas Lummis (born 1936), American writer
- Douglas E. Lumpkin, American politician
- Douglas Lumsden (born 1971), Scottish Conservative politician
- Douglas Lute (born 1952), American retired general
- Douglas Lynch (businessman) (1926–2016), Barbadian businessman and politician
- Douglas E. Lynch (born 1964), American academic administrator
- Douglas Lysnar (1867–1942), New Zealand lawyer, landowner, politician

==== M ====
- Douglas MacAgy (1913–1973), American curator, academic administrator
- Douglas MacArthur (1880–1964), American general
- Douglas MacArthur II (1909–1997), American diplomat
- Douglas Hastings Macarthur (1839–1892), New Zealand politician
- Douglas MacDiarmid (1922–2020), New Zealand painter
- Douglas MacDonald (1900–1996), Canadian politician, farmer, and miner
- Douglas MacDowell (1931–2010), British classical scholar
- Douglas M. C. MacEwan (1917–2000), Scottish physicist
- Douglas Macfadyen (1902–1968), Royal Air Force Air Marshal
- Douglas R. MacFarlane, Australian chemist
- Douglas Macgregor (born 1947), U.S. Army colonel and government official
- Douglas Machray (1911–1977), British newspaper editor
- Douglas Macinnis (1903–1982), Australian public servant
- Douglas Clyde Macintosh (1877–1948), Canadian theologian
- Douglas MacKenzie (1842–1890), Anglican bishop
- Douglas Mackessack (1903–1987), Scottish cricketer and distiller
- Douglas Mackiernan (1913–1950), American CIA officer
- Douglas Mackillop (1891–1959), British diplomat
- Douglas Mackinnon (born 1901), Scottish director
- Douglas Mackintosh (1931–2024), British alpine skier
- Douglas MacLean (1890–1967), American actor
- Douglas Maclean (1852–1929), New Zealand politician
- Douglas Macmillan (1884–1969), English cancer charity founder
- Douglas B. Maddox (born 1966), American film producer
- Douglas Maia (born 1989), Brazilian footballer
- Douglas Maimane (born 1969), South African politician
- Douglas Major (born 1953), American musician
- Douglas Malcolm (1883–1969), British army officer acquitted of 1917 murder
- Douglas Malewicki, American aerospace engineer and inventor
- Douglas Malloch (1877–1938), American poet
- Douglas Manley (1922–2013), Jamaican politician
- Douglas Mann (politician), American politician
- Douglas L. Mann, American physician
- Douglas Mapfumo (born 2000), Zimbabwean footballer
- Douglas Marland (1935–1993), American screenwriter
- Douglas Marsden-Jones (1893–1955), British Lions & Wales international rugby union player
- Douglas Marshall (1906–1976), British businessman and politician
- Douglas B. Marshall (1917–2007), American industrialist and rancher
- Douglas A. Martin (born 1973), American writer
- Douglas J. Martin (1927–2010), Mormon leader
- Douglas Martínez (born 1997), Honduran footballer
- Douglas Mason (1941–2004), British activist
- Douglas Massey (born 1952), American sociologist
- Douglas Mast (1944–2002), American Sports shooter
- Douglas Mata, American pathologist
- Douglas Matera (born 1993), Brazilian Paralympic swimmer
- Douglas Mathewson (1870–1948), American politician
- Douglas Mawson (1882–1958), Australian geologist and explorer of the Antarctic
- Douglas Maxwell (born 1974), British playwright
- Douglas McAllister (born 1973), Scottish Labour Party politician
- Douglas McAlpine (1890–1981), British neurologist
- Douglas J. McAneny (born 1955), United States admiral
- Douglas Francis McArthur (born 1943), Canadian politician
- Douglas McBain (1924–2008), Scottish footballer
- Douglas McCain (1981–2014), American ISIL militant
- Douglas J. McCarron (born 1951), American labor union leader
- Douglas McCarthy (1966–2025), English singer
- Douglas McCauley (born 1979), American marine biologist
- Douglas McConnel (1893–1961), British general
- Douglas H. McCorkindale (born 1939), American business executive
- Douglas Walter McCormick (born 1949), American businessman
- Douglas McCraith (1878–1952), British solicitor
- Douglas McCrory, American politician
- Douglas McCulloh (born 1959), American photographer
- Douglas McCullough (1945–2022), American lawyer and judge
- Douglas McDonald (rower) (born 1935), Canadian rower
- Douglas C. McDougal (1876–1964), United States Marine Corps general
- Douglas L. McElhaney (born 1947), American diplomat
- Douglas Thomas McFarlane (1918–1999), Canadian politician
- Douglas McFerran (born 1958), English actor
- Douglas McGowan (1915–1989), Canadian politician
- Douglas McGrath (1958–2022), American writer, director, and actor
- Douglas McGregor (1906–1964), American management professor
- Douglas McGregor (aviator) (1895–1953), Canadian aviator
- Douglas McIldoon (born 1945), Northern Irish politician
- Douglas McIlroy (born 1932), American mathematician and computer scientist
- Douglas Mary McKain (1789–1873), Nurse, midwife, businesswoman
- Douglas McKay (1893–1959), American politician
- Douglas McKay (cricketer) (1904–1994), Australian cricketer
- Douglas Imrie McKay (1883–1962), American police commissioner
- Douglas McKenzie (1906–1979), Australian cricketer
- Douglas McKeown (1947–2022), American filmmaker, actor, and writer
- Douglas McKie (1896–1967), British chemist and science historian
- Douglas McKittrick (born 1953), Anglican priest
- Douglas McLean (rower) (1863–1901), English rower and cricketer
- Douglas McLelland (born 1905), Scottish footballer
- Douglas G. McMahon, American biologist
- Douglas Crawford McMurtrie (1888–1944), American typeface designer
- Douglas McNeil (born 1988), American gridiron football player
- Douglas McNish (1912–1983), Toronto lawyer and politician
- Douglas McPhail (1914–1944), American actor
- Douglas McWhirter (1886–1966), English footballer
- Douglas McWilliams (born 1951), British economic consultant
- Douglas Meakin (1929–1998), English cricketer and Royal Air Force airman
- Douglas Medin (born 1944), American psychologist
- Douglas Meerwald (1901–2003), Ceylon musician
- Douglas Melamed (born 1945), American lawyer
- Douglas Melin (1895–1946), Swedish long jumper and zoologist
- Douglas Melini, American artist
- Douglas A. Melton (born 1953), American medical researcher
- Douglas Melville (1928–2021), South African water polo player
- Douglas Mendes (footballer, born 1988), Brazilian footballer
- Douglas Mendes (footballer, born 2004), Brazilian footballer
- Douglas A. Mendini (1953–2016), American dramatist
- Douglas Menzies (1907–1974), Australian judge
- Douglas Mercer-Henderson, British Army officer
- Douglas Merrill (born 1970), American businessman
- Douglas Messerli (born 1947), American dramatist
- Douglas Metcalf, American musician
- Douglas Mews (born 1956), New Zealand organist
- Douglas Mews (composer) (1918–1993), Canadian composer and musician
- Douglas Miles (born 1963), American painter
- Douglas Miller (Alberta politician) (1904–1982), Canadian politician
- Douglas Miller (Indiana politician), American politician
- Douglas Miller (musician) (1949–2021), American gospel musician
- Douglas Miller (surgeon) (1937–1995), Scottish neurosurgeon
- Douglas Millings (1913–2001), British fashion designer
- Douglas R. Mills (1907–1993), American basketball player and coach
- Douglas Milmine (1921–2017), British Anglican bishop
- Douglas Milsome (born 1939), English cinematographer
- Douglas Mineiro (born 1993), Brazilian footballer
- Douglas Mintz (born 1952), American politician
- Douglas Mitchell (1939–2022), Canadian football player
- Douglas Mitchell (scientist) (born 1980), American chemist
- Douglas Edgar Mitchell (1896–1988), South African politician
- Douglas W. Mitchell (1953–2020), American economist
- Douglas Moffat (cricketer) (1843–1922), English cricketer
- Douglas M. Moffat (1881–1956), American lawyer and diplomat
- Douglas Moggach (born 2000), Canadian philosopher
- Douglas Mombeshora (born 1961), Zimbabwean politician
- Douglas Graham, 5th Duke of Montrose (1852–1925), Scottish nobleman
- Douglas Monypenny (1878–1900), Scotland international rugby union player
- Douglas J. Moo (born 1950), American New Testament scholar
- Douglas Moore (1893–1969), American composer
- Douglas Moore (football manager), New Zealand football manager
- Douglas E. Moore (1928–2019), American minister
- Douglas Stuart, 20th Earl of Moray (1928–2011), British peer
- Douglas Morison (1814–1847), English painter
- Douglas Morland (1944–2016), New Zealand cricketer
- Douglas Morpeth (1924–2014), Scottish accountant and soldier
- Douglas Wellesley Morrell (1917–1996), English electrical engineer
- Douglas Morris (1908–1990), Royal Air Force Air Marshal
- Douglas J. Morris, American judge
- Douglas Morrow (1913–1994), American film producer
- Douglas Morton (politician) (1916–2001), Canadian politician
- Douglas Michael Morton (1924–2003), British petroleum geologist
- Douglas Moss, American architect
- Douglas Mossman (1933–2021), American actor
- Douglas Moylan (born 1966), Guamanian politician
- Douglas Muggeridge (1928–1985), British radio executive
- Douglas Muir (actor) (1914–1966), British actor
- Douglas Muir (rugby union) (1925–2014), Scotland international rugby union player
- Douglas N. Muir, British philatelist
- Douglas P. Mulholland (1929–2018), American government official
- Douglas Munro (actor) (1866–1924), English actor
- Douglas Albert Munro (1919–1942), U.S. Coast Guard Medal of Honor recipient
- Douglas Anne Munson (1948–2003), American novelist
- Douglas Murray (author) (born 1979), British author and political commentator
- Douglas Murray (ice hockey) (born 1980), Swedish ice hockey player
- Douglas Murray (politician), Canadian politician
- Douglas Murray (sound editor), American sound editor
- Douglas Myall (1922–2019), British philatelist and civil servant
- Douglas Myers (1938–2017), New Zealand businessman
- Douglas Myers (film editor) (1910–1962), British film editor

==== N ====
- Douglas Natelson (born 1970), American professor of physics
- Douglas Nation (1916–1997), English/Northern India cricketer
- Douglas Neame (1901–1988), English hurdler
- Douglas Neil (1924–1994), Canadian politician
- Douglas Neilson (born 1948), South African cricketer
- Douglas NeJaime, American legal scholar
- Douglas Nelson (born 1959), American judoka
- Douglas Netter (1921–2017), American television executive
- Douglas Newman (1920–1959), English cricketer
- Douglas Nicholls (1906–1988), Governor of South Australia (1976–77)
- Douglas Nicholson (1867–1946), Royal Navy Admiral
- Douglas Niles (born 1954), American writer & game designer
- Douglas Nixon (1898–1980), New Zealand cricketer
- Douglas E. Noble, American architect
- Douglas Noll (born 1950), American bioengineer
- Douglas Nonis (1937–2023), Malaysian field hockey player
- Douglas M. North, American academic administrator
- Douglas Northcott (1916–2005), British mathematician
- Douglas Robert Nowicki (1945–2024), American Benedictine abbot and priest

==== O ====
- Douglas O'Connor (born 1931), United States Army general
- Douglas O'Donnell, American government official
- Douglas Oakervee (born 1940), British civil engineer
- Douglas G. Ober, American businessman
- Douglas Odame (born 1963), Ghanaian boxer
- Douglas Ogada (born 1948), Ugandan boxer
- Douglas Oldenburg, American pastor
- Douglas Oliveira (born 1995), Brazilian footballer
- Douglas Oliver (1937–2000), English poet, novelist, editor, and educator
- Douglas Onça (born 1957), Brazilian footballer
- Douglas Orr (1892–1966), American architect
- Douglas Osborne (born 1952), Rugby player
- Douglas Osheroff (born 1945), American physicist
- Douglas Osmond (1914–2006), British Chief Constable
- Douglas Ousterhout (born 1935), American surgeon
- Douglas Ovenstone (1921–2011), South African cricketer
- Douglas W. Owsley (born 1951), American anthropologist
- Douglas Owusu (born 2006), Ghanaian footballer

==== P ====
- Douglas P. (born 1956), British musician
- Douglas H. Paal, American diplomat
- Douglas Packard (1903–2000), British Army general
- Douglas Packer (born 1987), Brazilian footballer
- Douglas Pajetat (born 1986), Cameroonian footballer
- Douglas Palm (born 1955), Swedish tennis player
- Douglas Palmer (born 1951), Mayor of Trenton, New Jersey
- Douglas Park (businessman) (born 1950), Scottish businessman (b.1950) associated with Rangers Football Club
- Douglas Parker (born 1963), American dramatist
- Douglas H. Parker (1926–2019), American lawyer
- Douglas L. Parker, American lawyer
- Douglas Parkhill (1923–1995), Canadian technologist, Assistant Deputy Minister (Research), Department of Communications, Government of Canada
- Douglas Parnham (born 1951), British canoeist
- Douglas Partie (born 1961), American volleyball player
- Douglas Pask (1919–2008), British electrical engineer
- Douglas Lane Patey (born 1953), American academic
- Douglas Paul, British quantum physicist
- Douglas Paulson (born 1980), American artist
- Douglas Payne (1875–1965), British actor
- Douglas Peers, Canadian historian
- Douglas Donato Pereira (1991–2016), Brazilian drug lord
- Douglas G. Perry (born 1967), U.S. Navy admiral
- Douglas Peters (1930–2016), Canadian banker, economist, and politician
- Douglas J. J. Peters (1963–2023), American politician
- Douglas W. Petersen (1948–2014), American politician
- Douglas L. Peterson (born 1959), American businessperson and entrepreneur
- Douglas Pettigrew (1917–1973), Canadian politician
- Douglas Phillips (designer) (1922–1995), Artist
- Douglas Craven Phillott (1869–1930), Army officer, linguist, translator
- Douglas Philp (born 1967), Scottish chemist
- Douglas Pickett, American state politician
- Douglas Pielou (1887–1927), British soldier and politician
- Douglas Pierrotti (born 1959), Brazilian futsal player
- Douglas Pike (1924–2002), American historian
- Douglas Pipes (born 1962), American film score composer
- Douglas J. Pirie (1907–1935), English motorcycle racer
- Douglas Pitbull (born 1986), Brazilian footballer
- Douglas Plaister (1912–1993), Australian politician
- Douglas Porch (born 1944), American military historian and academic
- Douglas Prasher (born 1951), American molecular biologist
- Douglas Pratt (cricketer) (born 1993), English cricketer
- Douglas Henry Pratt (1892–1958), British soldier
- Douglas Prescott, American politician
- Douglas Preston (born 1956), American journalist and author
- Douglas A. Preston (1858–1929), American attorney and politician
- Douglas Proby (1856–1931), British politician
- Douglas Purviance (born 1952), American jazz musician
- Douglas Putnam (1838–1918), American Army colonel
- Douglas Pyne (1847–1888), British politician

==== Q ====
- Douglas Quadling (1926–2015), English mathematician and school master
- Douglas Quijano (1944–2009), Filipino talent manager

==== R ====
- Douglas Rae (businessman) (1931–2018), Scottish businessman
- Douglas Rae (producer) (born 1947), Scottish film producer
- Douglas W. Rae (born 1939), American political scientist
- Douglas Rain (1928–2018), Canadian actor and narrator
- Douglas Ramsay (1945–1961), American figure skater
- Douglas Ramsey (diplomat) (1934–2018), American diplomat and Vietnam POW
- Douglas Ranasinghe (born 1942), Sri Lankan actor
- Douglas B. Rasmussen (born 1948), American political philosopher
- Douglas Ravenel (born 1947), American mathematician
- Douglas L. Rayes (born 1952), American judge
- Douglas Razzano (born 1988), Figure skater
- Douglas Rediker, American lawyer
- Douglas Reed (1895–1976), British journalist and writer
- Douglas Reeman (1924–2017), British writer
- Douglas C. Rees (born 1952), American biochemist
- Douglas Reid (cricketer) (1886–1959), Australian cricketer
- Douglas Reid (priest) (1934–2000), British priest
- Douglas Miller Reid (1897–1959), British botanist
- Douglas Reis (born 1991), Brazilian footballer
- Douglas dos Reis (born 1995), Brazilian discus thrower
- Douglas Quinta Reis, Brazilian editor and publisher
- Douglas Reith (born 1953), British actor and educator
- Douglas Relf (1907–1970), English artist and illustrator
- Douglas ReVelle (1945–2010), American astronomer
- Douglas Rex, American gastroenterologist
- Douglas Reye (1912–1977), Australian pathologist
- Douglas Reynolds (1882–1916), Recipient of the Victoria Cross
- Douglas E. Richards (born 1962), American novelist
- Douglas Richardson (born 1951), American genealogist
- Douglas Richman (born 1943), American virologist
- Douglas Rico (born 1969), Venezuelan policeman
- Douglas Riding (born 1943), Australian air marshal
- Douglas Riemer (1917–1996), South African cricketer
- Douglas Rimmer (1927–2004), British economist and historian
- Douglas Rinaldi (born 1979), Brazilian footballer
- Douglas H. Ring (1907–2000), American inventor
- Douglas Rintoul, British theatre director and playwright
- Douglas Ritchie (1905–1967), British journalist
- Douglas Hamilton Ritchie (1918–1999), Rhodesian dentist and politician
- Douglas Ritsema (born 1952), American lawyer and politician
- Douglas Riva (born 1951), American classical pianist
- Douglas Rivers, American political scientist
- Douglas Robb (schoolmaster) (born 1970), English schoolmaster
- Douglas Robb (surgeon) (1899–1974), New Zealand academic
- Douglas J. Robb, United States Air Force general
- Douglas Roberts (1919–1976), Australian painter and art critic
- Douglas B. Roberts (born 1947), American treasurer
- Douglas Argyll Robertson (1837–1909), Scottish ophthalmologist
- Douglas Robinson (academic) (born 1954), American academic scholar
- Douglas Robinson (English cricketer) (1884–1963), English cricketer
- Douglas Roche (born 1929), Canadian politician
- Douglas Rodrigues (footballer) (born 1982), Brazilian footballer
- Douglas Rodríguez (boxer) (1950–2012), Cuban boxer
- Douglas Rogers (writer) (born 1968), Zimbabwean writer
- Douglas Rolfe (1953–2020), Australian cricketer
- Douglas Rolland (1861–1914), Scottish golfer
- Douglas Romayne (born 1974), Musical artist
- Douglas Rosado (born 1964), Puerto Rican bobsledder
- Douglas Ross (Canadian politician) (1883–1961), Canadian politician
- Douglas Ross (physicist) (born 1948), British physicist
- Douglas Ross (Scottish politician) (born 1983), Scottish politician
- Douglas A. Ross (born 1948), Canadian political scientist
- Douglas George Ross (1897–1980), British chief constable
- Douglas T. Ross (1929–2007), American computer scientist
- Douglas A. Rossman (1936–2015), American herpetologist
- Douglas Rowe (1938–2023), American actor
- Douglas Ruas (born 1989), Brazilian politician
- Douglas Clifton Brown, 1st Viscount Ruffside (1879–1958), British politician
- Douglas Rushkoff (born 1961), American writer and media theorist
- Douglas Rutherford (1915–1988), Irish-born British crime writer
- Douglas De Ruymbeke (1894–1977), Belgian footballer
- Douglas Ryder (born 1971), South African cyclist
- Douglas Ryley (1905–1985), Senior Royal Air Force officer

==== S ====
- Douglas Sadownick (born 2000), American psychologist and writer
- Douglas Sagers, American politician
- Douglas Samuel, Scottish football coach
- Douglas Pedro Sánchez (born 1952), Puerto Rican film director and screenwriter
- Douglas Sannachan (born 1962), Scottish actor
- Douglas Santos (footballer, born 1994) (born 1994), Brazilian footballer
- Douglas dos Santos (footballer, born 1991) (born 1991), Brazilian footballer
- Douglas Sargent (1907–1979), British bishop
- Douglas Sarine, American actor
- Douglas Saunders (born 1949), Jamaican diplomat
- Douglas Savage (1892–1967), British flying ace
- Douglas Barton Osborne Savile (1909–2000), Canadian biologist
- Douglas Savory (1878–1969), British politician
- Douglas Says (born 1961), American fashion designer and stylist
- Douglas James Scalapino (born 1933), American physicist
- Douglas Schemske (born 1948), American evolutionary ecologist
- Douglas Scherr (born 1967), American surgeon
- Douglas Schiess (born 1970), U.S. Space Force general officer
- Douglas C. Schmidt (born 1962), American computer scientist
- Douglas Schoen (born 1953), American political consultant
- Douglas Schulze (1881–1956), Scotland international rugby union player
- Douglas Schwartz (born 1944), American television screenwriter
- Douglas W. Schwartz (1929–2016), American archaeologist
- Douglas Scott (choreographer), American choreographer
- Douglas Scott (designer) (1913–1990), British industrial designer
- Douglas Scott (judge) (born 1941), South African judge
- Douglas Scott (politician) (1920–2012), Australian politician
- Douglas Scott (writer) (1926–1996), Thriller writer
- Douglas D. Scott (born 2000), American archaeologist
- Douglas P. Scott (born 1960), American politician
- Douglas Seale (1913–1999), British actor
- Douglas Self (born 1950), British electronics engineer and author
- Douglas September (born 1972), Canadian musician
- Douglas Sequeira (born 1977), Costa Rican footballer
- Douglas Sequeira (footballer, born 2003) (born 2003), Costa Rican footballer
- Douglas A. Shackelford, American professor
- Douglas Sharon (born 1941), Canadian cultural anthropologist
- Douglas Shearer (1899–1971), Canadian sound designer and recording director
- Douglas James Shearman (1918–2003), British geologist
- Douglas Sheffield, Baroness Sheffield (1542–1608), lover of Robert Dudley
- Douglas W. Shorenstein (1955–2015), American lawyer
- Douglas Shulman (born 1967), American businessman
- Douglas Siggs (1920–2008), Australian cricketer
- Douglas H. Sillers (1915–2011), American politician
- Douglas Silliman, American diplomat
- Douglas Sills (born 1960), American actor
- Douglas Silva (born 1988), Brazilian actor and singer
- Douglas Silva (footballer, born 1974), Brazilian footballer
- Douglas Silva (footballer, born 1983), Brazilian footballer
- Douglas Silva (footballer, born 1999), Brazilian footballer
- Douglas da Silva (born 1984), Brazilian footballer
- Douglas Simpson (born 1982), Scottish field hockey player
- Douglas Sims (born 1968), U.S. Army director of the Joint Staff
- Douglas Sirk (1897–1987), German film director
- Douglas Skelton, Scottish writer
- Douglas J. Skinner, American academic
- Douglas Reid Skinner (born 1949), South African writer, editor, translator and poet
- Douglas Sladen (1856–1947), English author and academic
- Douglas Slater, Saint Vincent and the Grenadines politician
- Douglas Sloan (filmmaker) (born 1901), American film director
- Douglas M. Sloan (born 1933), American curriculum theorist
- Douglas Slocombe (1913–2016), English cinematographer
- Douglas Smale (1916–2006), English footballer
- Douglas W. Small (born 1965), American Navy admiral
- Douglas Smith (actor) (born 1985), Canadian actor
- Douglas Smith (Australian cricketer) (1880–1933), Australian cricketer
- Douglas Smith (broadcaster) (1924–1972), British radio actor and announcer
- Douglas Smith (English cricketer) (1915–2001), English cricketer
- Douglas Smith (Guyanese cricketer) (born 1884), Guyanese cricketer
- Douglas Smith (Maine politician) (born 1946), American politician
- Douglas Smith (special effects artist) (born 2000), Visual effects artist
- Douglas Smith (writer) (born 1962), American writer, historian and translator
- Douglas Burnet Smith (born 1949), Canadian poet
- Douglas E. Smith (1960–2014), American video game programmer
- Douglas James Smith (1873–1949), English cricketer and umpire
- Douglas M. Smith (born 1990), American legislator
- Douglas Smythe (born 1950), American visual effects artist
- Douglas Snelling (1916–1985), Australian architect and designer
- Douglas E. Soltis (born 1953), American botanist
- Douglas George Sopwith (1906–1970), Scottish engineer
- Douglas Soto (born 1975), Second Vice President of Costa Rica since 2026
- Douglas Souza (born 1995), Brazilian volleyball player
- Douglas de Souza (1972–1998), Brazilian long jumper
- Douglas Houghton, Baron Houghton of Sowerby (1898–1996), British politician
- Douglas Spain (born 1974), American actor
- Douglas Spalding (1841–1877), British biologist
- Douglas Sparks (born 1956), American Episcopal bishop
- Douglas Spedden (1905–1915), Child survivor of the sinking of the RMS Titanic
- Douglas Spencer-Nairn (1906–1970), British Unionist politician
- Douglas Spencer, New Zealand Anglican priest
- Douglas Spink (1971–2020), American zoophile advocate and criminal
- Douglas Spiro (1863–1935), Australian-born English cricketer
- Douglas Robinson Sr. (1824–1893), Scottish-American banker and businessman
- Douglas Staiger, John French Professor in Economics at Dartmouth College
- Douglas Stanes (1917–2001), Canadian politician
- Douglas Stanford (born 2000), American physicist
- Douglas Stanley (1890–1958), American vocal pedagogue and scientist
- Douglas Steakley (born 1944), Metalsmith & photographer
- Douglas Steel (1856–1933), English cricketer
- Douglas Steenland (born 1951), American attorney and airline executive
- Douglas V. Steere (1901–1995), American philosopher, theologian, translator
- Douglas Steinbrech (born 1965), American plastic surgeon
- Douglas C. Steiner (born 1960), American real estate developer
- Douglas C. Steltz (1920–2009), American politician
- Douglas Stenstrom (1921–2010), Florida politician
- Douglas Stenton (born 1953), Canadian archaeologist
- Douglas Stephan (born 1953), Canadian chemist
- Douglas S. S. Steuart (1872–1949), British mining engineer
- Douglas Stevens (born 1952), Australian bishop
- Douglas Stevenson (born 1953), American author
- Douglas Stewart (equestrian) (1913–1991), British equestrian
- Douglas Stewart (film editor) (1919–1995), American film editor
- Douglas Stewart (poet) (1913–1985), Australian poet
- Douglas Day Stewart (born 1940), American screenwriter and film director
- Douglas Stitt, U.S. Army general
- Douglas Stoddart (born 1952), American politician
- Douglas M. Stone, United States Marine Corps general
- Douglas Maxwell Stone (born 1948), Australian geologist
- Douglas Strachan (1875–1950), Scottish stained glass artist
- Douglas Straight (1844–1914), British politician
- Douglas Strawbridge (1908–1979), Former Mayor of Nelson
- Douglas Stringfellow (1922–1966), US soldier, politician, and military impostor
- Douglas Stuart (biblical scholar) (born 1943), American biblical scholar
- Douglas Stuart (rower) (1885–1969), British rower
- Douglas Stuart (writer) (born 1976), Scottish fashion designer and novelist
- Douglas G. Stuart (1931–2019), Australian neuroscientist
- Douglas Stubbs (1927–2008), Australian artist
- Douglas Sturkey (born 1935), Australian diplomat
- Douglas Summers (1911–2000), English cricketer
- Douglas Sutherland (1919–1995), British writer
- Douglas Syakalima (born 1967), Zambian politician
- Douglas Sydnor (1919–1969), American baseball player
- Douglas Syphax (1842–1890), Union Army sergeant

==== T ====
- Douglas Tait (actor) (born 1978), American actor, stuntman, and independent filmmaker
- Douglas Tait (illustrator) (born 1944), Canadian children's book illustrator
- Douglas Tallamy, American entomologist
- Douglas Tanque (born 1993), Brazilian footballer
- Douglas Tardin (born 1992), Brazilian footballer
- Douglas D. Taylor, American entrepreneur and academic researcher
- Douglas Graham Taylor (1936–2009), Canadian politician
- Douglas Arthur Teed (1860–1929), American painter
- Douglas Teixeira (born 2001), Brazilian footballer
- Douglas Telles (born 2007), Brazilian footballer
- Douglas Tennant (1906–1985), British trade union leader
- Douglas Terman (1933–1999), American novelist
- Douglas H. Thayer (1929–2017), American novelist
- Douglas E. Theuner (1938–2013), American bishop
- Douglas Thollar (1919–2005), Australian cricketer
- Douglas Thomas (academic) (born 1966), American scholar
- Douglas Thomas (Maine politician), American politician and businessperson
- Douglas Thomas (New Hampshire politician), American politician
- Douglas Thomson (footballer) (born 1891), Scottish footballer
- Douglas Thor (born 1997), Swedish politician
- Douglas Thornley, American architect
- Douglas M. Thornton (1873–1907), English missionary
- Douglas Tilden (1860–1935), American sculptor
- Douglas Tirola (born 1968), American film director
- Douglas Tobias, American chemist
- Douglas F. Tobler (born c. 1936), American Latter Day Saint writer
- Douglas Tompkins (1943–2015), Chilean-American businessman and environmentalist
- Douglas Tooth (1904–1982), Australian politician
- Douglas Tottle (born 1944), Canadian trade union activist and journalist
- Douglas Townsend (1921–2012), American classical composer
- Douglas Trainer, British trade unionist
- Douglas Trathen (1916–1998), Australian Methodist minister and headmaster
- Douglas Trevor (born 1969), American author and academic
- Douglas Trottier, American politician
- Douglas Trumbull (1942–2022), American film director, special effects designer
- Douglas Turner (rower) (1932–2018), American rower, journalist, and newspaper executive
- Douglas Turner (sprinter) (born 1966), British former track and field sprinter
- Douglas Turner (tennis) (1883–1959), American tennis player
- Douglas H. Turner, American chemist

==== U ====
- Douglas H. Ubelaker (born 1946), American forensic anthropologist
- Douglas Ulmer (born 1960), American mathematician
- Douglas Unger (born 1952), American novelist
- Douglas Urbanski (born 1957), American film producer
- Douglas Max Utter (born 1950), American painter
- Douglas Den Uyl (born 1950), American philosopher

==== V ====
- Douglas Vakoch (born 1961), American pro-contact astrobiologist
- Douglas Vandor (born 1974), Canadian rower
- Douglas Vautin (1896–1976), Australian cricketer
- Douglas Vaz (1930s–2019), Jamaican politician
- Douglas Veale (1891–1973), British civil servant and university administrator
- Douglas Vernon (1905–1979), English footballer
- Douglas P. Verret (born 1901), American physicist
- Douglas Vickers (1861–1937), British politician
- Douglas Viegas (born 1979), Brazilian politician
- Douglas Vieira (judoka) (born 1960), Brazilian judoka
- Douglas Vieira (footballer) (born 1987), Brazilian footballer
- Douglas Vincent (Australian Army officer) (1916–1995), Australian general
- Douglas Vincent (cricketer) (born 1954), Scottish cricketer
- Douglas Volk (1856–1935), American painter

==== W ====
- Douglas Wahlsten (born 1943), Canadian neuroscientist
- Douglas Wakefield (1899–1951), British actor
- Douglas Wakiihuri (born 1963), Kenyan long-distance runner
- Douglas Walatara (1920–2011), Sri Lankan lecturer
- Douglas Walkden-Brown (1921–2013), Fijian educator, politician, and diplomat
- Douglas Walker (artist) (born 1958), Canadian painter
- Douglas Walker (sprinter) (born 1973), Scottish sprinter
- Peahead Walker (1899–1970), American sports coach
- Douglas Walla (born 1951), American art collector
- Douglas C. Wallace (born 1946), American geneticist
- Douglas Waller (born 1949), American journalist
- Douglas Walter, American percussionist
- Douglas Walton (actor) (1910–1961), Canadian-American actor
- Douglas N. Walton (1942–2020), Canadian academic and author
- Douglas Wanstall (1899–1974), English Anglican priest
- Douglas Waples (1893–1978), American librarian
- Douglas Turner Ward (1930–2021), American playwright and actor
- Douglas Wardlaw (1904–1968), Australian cricketer
- Douglas Waring, British mining businessman
- Douglas Warren (1922–2011), Canadian air force pilot and commander
- Douglas Warren (bishop) (1919–2013), Australian Catholic bishop
- Douglas Warrick, American biologist
- Douglas Wass (1923–2017), British civil servant
- Douglas Watkinson (born 1945), English crime writer
- Douglas Chalmers Watson (1870–1946), Scottish physician and writer
- Douglas Watt (critic) (1914–2009), American dramatist
- Douglas Watt (politician) (1914–1985), Canadian politician
- Douglas Watt (psychologist) (born 1950), American psychologist
- Douglas Lafayette Weart (1891–1975), US Army general
- Douglas Webb (1922–1996), English photographer
- Douglas Webb (police officer) (1909–1988), British police officer
- Douglas A. Webber (1901–1971), Canadian architect
- Douglas Weiland (born 1954), British composer
- Douglas Werner (born 1960), American engineer and scientist
- Douglas West (mathematician) (born 1953), American mathematician
- Douglas Westfall (born 1949), American historian and author
- Douglas Westland (1909–1998), Scottish footballer
- Douglas Whalen, American linguist
- Douglas H. Wheelock (born 1960), American engineer and astronaut
- Douglas White (jurist) (born 1945), New Zealand jurist
- Douglas J. White (1933–2012), British operations researcher
- Douglas R. White (1942–2021), American social scientist
- Douglas Whiteway (born 1961), Canadian journalist and author
- Douglas Whynott (born 1950), American writer
- Douglas Whyte (born 1971), South African jockey and horse trainer
- Douglas Wick (born 1954), American film producer
- Douglas Wicks, American politician
- Douglas Wiebe, American epidemiologist
- Douglas Wiens, Canadian statistician
- Douglas A. Wiens, American geophysicist
- Douglas Wigdor (born 1968), American lawyer
- Douglas Wijkander (1918–1984), Swedish equestrian
- Douglas Wilder (born 1931), American politician
- Douglas Wilmer (1920–2016), British actor
- Douglas Wilson (activist) (1950–1992), Canadian gay activist
- Douglas Wilson (basketball) (born 1999), American basketball player
- Douglas Wilson (bishop) (1903–1980), Anglican bishop
- Douglas Wilson (interior designer), American interior designer
- Douglas Wilson (RAAF officer) (1898–1950), Senior officer of the RAAF
- Douglas Wilson (theologian) (born 1953), American theologian
- Douglas L. Wilson (born 1935), American academic
- Douglas Wimberley (1896–1983), British Army general
- Douglas Winston (1932–2021), Australian sprinter
- Douglas E. Winter (born 1950), American writer, critic and lawyer
- Douglas Wiseman (1930–2020), Canadian politician
- Douglas Wolk (born 1950), American author and critic
- Douglas Wolton (1899–1988), South African Communist Party chairman
- Douglas Woo (born 1978), Hong Kong financer
- Douglas Wood (actor) (1880–1966), American actor
- Douglas Wood (engineer) (1941–2019), Australian construction engineer
- Douglas Wood (naturalist) (born 1951), American naturalist
- Douglas Wood (writer) (born 1901), American author, writer, creative executive, director, and producer
- Douglas E. Wood, American thoracic surgeon and academic
- Douglas Woodall (born 1943), British mathematician
- Douglas P. Woodlock (born 1947), American judge
- Douglas Woodruff (1897–1978), British journalist and wit
- Douglas Benjamin Woodworth (1841–1900), Canadian politician
- Douglas Woolf (1922–1992), American author
- Douglas Woolley (1936—2022), English claimant of RMS Titanic
- Douglas S. Wreden (born 1991), American Youtuber and streamer
- Douglas Wright (cricketer) (1894–1953), English cricketer and British Army officer
- Douglas Wright (dancer) (1956–2018), New Zealand dancer and choreographer
- Douglas Wright (physiologist) (1907–1990), Australian physiologist
- Douglas E. Wright (born 1955), Canadian writer
- Douglas Franklin Wright (1940–1996), American serial killer
- Douglas S. Wright, American attorney and politician (died 2023)
- Douglas Tyndall Wright (1927–2020), Canadian civil engineer
- Douglas Wyllie (born 1963), Scotland international rugby union player

==== Y ====
- Douglas Yard, Canadian judge
- Douglas Yates (born 1964), American political scientist
- Douglas Young (cricketer) (1917–1995), English cricketer
- Douglas Young (judge) (1883–1973), British judge and politician
- Douglas Young (solicitor) (born 1948), Scottish solicitor
- Douglas William Young (born 1950), Australian Catholic bishop
- Douglas Youvan (born 1955), American scientist

==== Z ====
- Douglas A. Zembiec (1973–2007), United States Marine Corps officer
- Douglas Zinkala (born 1944), Zambian long-distance runner

== Douglass ==
- Douglass Adair (1912–1968), American historian
- Douglass H. Atwill (1881–1960), American Episcopal bishop
- Douglass Boardman (1822–1891), American jurist and lawyer
- Douglass Cadwallader (1884–1971), American golfer
- Douglass Cater (1923–1995), American journalist, political aide and college president
- Douglass Crockwell (1904–1968), American artist and filmmaker
- Douglass Dumbrille (1889–1974), Canadian-American actor
- Douglass T. Greene (1891–1964), United States Army general
- Douglass F. Hoese (born 1942), American ichthyologist
- Douglass Houghton (1809–1845), American geologist
- Douglass Morse Howell (1906–1994), American papermaker and artist
- Douglass Mackey (born 1989 or 1990), American social media influencer
- Douglass Montgomery (1909–1966), American actor
- Douglass North (1920–2015), American economist and Nobel laureate
- Douglass Parker (1927–2011), American classicist, academic and translator
- Douglass Ewell Parshall (1899–1990), 20th-century American painter
- Douglass Sherley (1857–1917), American poet
- Douglass Stewart, American dramatist
- Douglass Sullivan-Gonzalez (born 1956), American historian
- Douglass Turnbull, British neurologist
- Douglass Wallop (1920–1985), American writer
- Douglass Watson (1921–1989), American actor

== Dougie ==
- Dougie Anderson (born 1976), Scottish presenter
- Dougie Arnott (born 1964), Scottish footballer
- Dougie Baldwin (born 1996), Australian actor
- Dougie on the Beat (born 1996), American record producer
- Dougie Bell (born 1959), Scottish footballer & manager
- Dougie Brimson (born 1959), English author and screenwriter
- Dougie Brown (born 1969), Scottish cricketer
- Dougie Cameron (born 1983), Scottish footballer
- Dougie Campbell (1901–1991), Scottish-American soccer player
- Dougie Costello (born 1983), Irish jockey
- Dougie Donnelly (born 1953), Scottish sports presenter
- Dougie Fife (born 1990), Scotland international rugby union player
- Dougie Fitzell (born 1994), Irish hurler
- Dougie Flockhart (born 1984), Scotland international rugby league & union footballer
- Dougie Freedman (born 1974), Scottish footballer
- Dougie Gray (1905–1972), Scottish footballer
- Dougie Hall (born 1980), Scotland international rugby union player
- Dougie Hamilton (born 1993), Canadian ice hockey player
- Dougie Hill (born 1985), Scottish footballer
- Dougie Imrie (born 1983), Scottish footballer
- Dougie Johnstone (born 1957), Scottish footballer
- Dougie Lampkin (born 1976), British motorcycle racer
- Dougie Lawrence (1929–2000), Scottish cricketer
- Dougie MacLean (born 1954), Scottish musician
- Dougie Marillier (born 1978), Zimbabwean cricketer
- Dougie McCracken (1964–2011), Scottish footballer
- Dougie McDonald (born 1965), Scottish football referee
- Dougie McGregor (1889–1963), New Zealand dual-code international rugby footballer
- Dougie McGuire (born 1967), Scottish footballer and manager
- Dougie McNab (born 1956), Scottish footballer
- Dougie Morgan (1947–2020), British Lions & Scotland international rugby union player
- Dougie Morkel (1885–1950), South African rugby union player
- Dougie Oliver (1906–1992), English footballer
- Dougie Padilla (born 1948), American poet and visual artist
- Dougie Payne (born 1972), Scottish bassist
- Dougie Poole, American singer-songwriter
- Dougie Poynter (born 1987), English musician
- Dougie Ramsay (born 1979), Scottish footballer and coach
- Dougie Robertson (born 1963), Scottish footballer
- Dougie Rooney (1947–2025), Scottish trade unionist
- Dougie Sharpe (1926–1974), Scottish footballer
- Dougie Smith (born 1962), British political advisor
- Dougie Squires (1932–2023), English choreographer
- Dougie Thomson (born 1951), British musician
- Dougie Vipond (born 1966), British musician
- Dougie Wallace, British photographer
- Dougie Wallace (soccer) (1919–1999), South African soccer player
- Dougie Wilkie (born 1956), Scottish footballer
- Dougie Wilson (born 1994), Northern Irish footballer
- Dougie Wood (1940–2022), Scottish footballer and manager
- Dougie Young (1930–1991), Australian musician

== Duggie ==
- Duggie Brown (1940–2022), English comedian and actor
- Duggie Brown (soccer) (born 1958), Australian footballer
- Duggie Fields (1945–2021), British artist
- Duggie Humphrey (1897–1965), English footballer
- Duggie Lochhead (1904–1968), Scottish footballer and manager
- Duggie Du Preez (1927–2000), South African boxer
- Duggie Reid (1917–2002), Scottish footballer
- Douglas Wakefield (1899–1951), British actor

== See also ==
- List of Irish-language given names
- List of Scottish Gaelic given names
