= Doogie =

Doogie may refer to:

- Doogie Howser, M.D., an American medical drama that ran for four seasons on ABC
- Doogie Kameāloha, M.D., an American family medical comedy-drama developed by Kourtney Kang
- Doogie White (born 1960), Scottish rock vocalist

== See also ==
- Dougie, a hip-hop dance
- Dougie (given name)
