= Douglas Moffat =

Douglas Moffat may refer to:

- Douglas Moffat (cricketer) (1843–1922), English cricketer
- Douglas M. Moffat (1881–1956), American lawyer and diplomat

== See also ==
- Doug Moffatt (born 1937), politician in Ontario, Canada
