= Douglas Reid (cricketer) =

Australian cricketer

Personal information
- Born: 23 September 1886; St Peters, New South Wales, Australia
- Died: 21 August 1959 (aged 72); Sydney, Australia
- Source: ESPNcricinfo, 17 January 2017

Douglas Reid (23 September 1886 – 21 August 1959) was an Australian cricketer. He played three first-class matches for New South Wales between 1908/09 and 1909/10.

== See also ==
- List of New South Wales representative cricketers
