= Douglas Pitbull =

Brazilian footballer (born 1986)

Personal information
- Full name: Douglas Galvão Silva
- Date of birth: May 21, 1986 (age 40)
- Place of birth: Brasília, Brazil
- Height: 1.78 m (5 ft 10 in)
- Position: Striker

Team information
- Current team: Clube Atlético Linense

Youth career
- 2004–2005: Brazlândia

Senior career*
Years	Team	Apps	(Gls)
2005–2007	Goiás	2	(0)
2005	→ Grêmio Anapolis (Loan)		
2006	→ Grêmio Anapolis (Loan)		
2006	→ Ituano (Loan)		
2007–2008	Mineiros Esporte Clube		
2008–2009	Iraty Sport Club	2	(0)
2009–2010	Clube Atlético Linense		
2010	Grêmio Esportivo Brasil		
2010–2011	Al Jahra	4	(0)
2011	Trindade Atlético Clube		
2011–	Clube Atlético Linense		
- * Club domestic league appearances and goals

Douglas Galvão Silva (born May 21, 1986), known as Douglas Pitbull or just Douglas, is a Brazilian striker. He currently plays for Clube Atlético Linense.

He made his professional debut for Goiás in a 1-3 defeat away to Flamengo in the Campeonato Brasileiro on August 26, 2007.

== Contract ==
- 13 December 2005 to 31 January 2008
