= Douglas Knoop =

British economist (1883–1948)

Douglas Knoop (1883–1948) Hon. ARIBA, was professor emeritus of economics at the University of Sheffield. With G. P. Jones, also professor of economics at Sheffield, he wrote a number of books on the history of freemasonry. A lecture is given at the university in his memory.

== Selected publications ==
=== Economics ===
- Principles and Methods of Municipal Trading. Macmillan & Co., London, 1912.
- Outlines of Railway Economics. Macmillan & Co., 1913.

=== Freemasonry ===
All with G. P. Jones:

- The Medieval Mason
- An Introduction to Freemasonry
- The Scottish Mason and the Mason Word
- A Short History of Freemasonry
- A Handlist of Masonic Documents
- The Genesis of Freemasonry. Manchester University Press, 1947.
