= Douglas Newman =

English cricketer

Douglas Leonard Newman (25 June 1920 – 10 September 1959) was an English first-class cricketer active from 1948 to 1953 who played for Middlesex and Marylebone Cricket Club (MCC). He was born in Harringay; and died in St Pancras, London.
