= Douglas Clark (poet) =

English poet

Douglas Clark (1942 – 20 July 2010) was an English poet.

Clark was born in Darlington, County Durham, England, to Scottish parents in 1942. He was educated at Glasgow University, where he studied mathematics, and in Edinburgh. From 1973 until 1993 he worked in Computing Services at the University of Bath, 10 years spent working on Multics. Since then he has done voluntary work.

From 1985 to 1991 he published an integrated set of four books (Troubador, Horsemen, Coatham, Disbanded) comprising the so-called The Horseman Trilogy from his own Benjamin Press and the pamphlet 'Dysholm' in 1993, which completed the series.

His second set of books comprises Selected Poems (Benjamin Press, 1995), the 'Cat Poems' pamphlet (Benjamin Press, 1997) and 'Wounds' (Salzburg University Press, 1997), which may be found at the backlist of Poetry Salzburg.

He edited the Webzine Lynx: Poetry from Bath for three years from 1997 to 2000. The 'Kitten Poems' pamphlet was published in 2002. For his 60th birthday on 3 October 2002 he prepared a final pamphlet 'Alive' which was published in 'Finality: New and Selected Poems' (Benjamin Press, 2005). The compilation 'Durham Poems' (Arrowhead Press, 2005) was published in the same year and may be found at Durham Poems of Arrowhead Press. The final book from his Benjamin Press, published on 1 May 2008, is Love Poems (ISBN 978-0-9510193-9-9). All his poetry is available on the World Wide Web where he has his readership.

A current selection of his work is available. An alternative selection of his work is available at Poets' corner which is curated by Anny Ballardini. The cover graphics of his publications are available.

Douglas Clark died on 20 July 2010 in the Royal United Hospital in Bath.
