= Douglas Bland =

Canadian writer

Douglas L. Bland
- Occupation: Novelist

Academic work
- Discipline: Defence studies
- Institutions: Queen's University at Kingston

Douglas L. Bland is a Canadian writer. A retired lieutenant colonel in the Canadian Armed Forces, Bland taught defence studies at Queen's University, Ontario for 15 years. He is best known for the controversial 2009 novel Uprising, a thriller about disenfranchised First Nations activists making protest attacks on Canadian oil and gas projects, which one reviewer called "the most dangerous book in Canada". Bland followed his novel up with Time Bomb: Canada and the First Nations arguing that a conflict between settlers and First nations was increasingly likely, and offering military advice to prepare the government for such a conflict. A First Nations reviewer of this second book described it as an "enemy text".
