= Douglas M. Johnston =

Scottish academic and author

Douglas M. Johnston was a Scottish-born academic and author.

== Life and career ==
Born in Scotland, Douglas graduated with a degree in legal studies from the University of St. Andrews in 1955. Later, he moved to Canada and studied at McGill Law School and then Yale Law School in the United States.

His works have been reviewed by reputed publications.

Douglas M. Johnston Lecture at Dalhousie University is named after him.

== Bibliography ==
=== Books ===
- Johnston, Douglas M. (1965). The International Law of the Fisheries: A Framework for Policy-Oriented Inquiries. Yale University Press.
- Johnston, Douglas M. (1988). The Theory and History of Ocean Boundary-Making. McGill-Queen's University Press)
- Valencia, Mark J.; Johnston, Douglas M. (1990). Pacific Ocean Boundary Problems: Status and Prospects. Martinus Nijhoff.

=== Editor ===
- The Environmental Law of the Sea (IUCN, 1981)
- Canada and the New International Law of the Sea. University of Toronto Press, 1985)
- Ocean Boundary Making: Regional Issues and Developments (Croom Helm, 1988)
