= Douglas Irvin-Erickson =

American political scientist

- Scientific career
- Fields: Political science
- Institutions: George Mason University

Douglas Irvin-Erickson is a political scientist and assistant professor at George Mason University.

== Works ==
- Irvin-Erickson, Douglas (2016). Raphael Lemkin and the Concept of Genocide. University of Pennsylvania Press. ISBN 978-0-8122-9341-8.
