= Douglas Westfall =

American historian, author

Douglas Westfall (born 1949) is an author, publisher and owner of the Paragon Agency. His books focus on American history and can range from reprinted autobiographies to retelling of famous events.

One of his main topics is Amelia Earhart. Westfall released never seen footage of Earhart before donating it to Purdue University in Indiana.

Westfall is a congressionally recognized national historian and winner of the DAR Historian Medal in 2016. He has published and written multiple books on American history and he also travels giving lectures on these topics.

The Paragon Agency was established in 1990.

== Works ==
- Letters from the Field (Paragon, 1997)
- Tour of Old Town Orange (Paragon, 1999)
- The Life of Emily Dickinson (Paragon, 2000)
- Prisoners of the Civil War (Paragon, 2001)
- Story of Old Town Bolsa (Paragon, 2003)
- The History of Corona Del Mar: Centennial Issue (Paragon, 2004)
- History of Corona Del Mar (Paragon, 2004)
- Escondido History (Paragon, 2005)
- Two Weeks in San Francisco (Paragon, 2006)
- Hunt for Amelia Earhart (Paragon, 2007)
- Ending Jet Lag (Paragon, 2008)
- Legends of the Flying Clippers (Paragon, 2012)
- Girl Across Panama (Paragon, 2013)
- Prisoner of the Civil War (Paragon, 2013)
- The Costa Mesa Bluffs (Paragon, 2014)
- The Taking of Saipan (Paragon, 2014)
- Southern California Water (Paragon, 2015)
- Ameilia Earhart's Terraplane (Paragon, (2016)
- White Pearl Red Sea (Paragon, 2016)
- Rosies Riveting Warfare (Paragon, 2017)
- A Century in Yellowstone (Paragon, 2022)
- Rancho Lands (Paragon, 2018)
- The Township (Paragon, 2018)
- 30 Days with Nat King Cole (Paragon, 2022)
- The LA 40s (Paragon, 2022)

== Films ==
Films based on Westfall's books:

- Old Towne Orange (Third Act, 1999)
- The Hunt for Amelia Earhart (Paragon, 2007)
- Last 90 Days of Amelia Earhart (Paragon, 2008)
