= Douglas Spiro =

Australian-born English cricketer

Personal information
- Full name: Douglas Gray Spiro
- Born: 21 December 1863; Melbourne, Victoria, Australia
- Died: 16 January 1935 (aged 71); Westminster, London, England
- Batting: Right-handed
- Bowling: Right-arm medium

Domestic team information
- Years: Team
- 1883–1885: Cambridge University
- 1883–1890: Marylebone Cricket Club

Career statistics
Competition	First-class
Matches	12
Runs scored	207
Batting average	10.35
100s/50s	–/–
Top score	47
Catches/stumpings	3/–
- Source: Cricinfo, 13 December 2022

Douglas Gray Spiro (21 December 1863 – 16 January 1935) was an Australian-born English cricketer who played in 12 first-class matches for Cambridge University and the Marylebone Cricket Club (MCC) between 1883 and 1890. He was born in Melbourne and died in Westminster, London.

Though Spiro was born in Australia, his father is noted in the Cambridge alumni directory as "Ferdinand" of Brighton. Spiro was educated at Harrow School and at Trinity Hall, Cambridge, though after 1885 he transferred to Downing College, Cambridge. He played cricket for Harrow and appeared in the Eton v Harrow match at Lord's in both 1881 and 1882. As a cricketer, he played as a right-handed middle-order batsman; he also bowled right-arm medium-pace, though he did not bowl in first-class cricket. He was successful as a batsman only occasionally. In 1883, playing for MCC, he made 47 against Derbyshire. The following year, he made the same score again, this time for MCC against the Cambridge University side. That innings propelled him into the Cambridge side for the 1884 University Match against Oxford University, but he was not successful, making scores of 10 and 0.

On leaving Cambridge University, Spiro became a "mining agent" and was described as "of Maidenhead".
