= Douglas Estay =

Chilean footballer (born 1992)

Personal information
- Full name: Douglas Fabián Estay Hermosilla
- Date of birth: 25 April 1992 (age 34)
- Place of birth: Viña del Mar, Chile
- Height: 1.82 m (6 ft 0 in)
- Position: Midfielder

Youth career
- Everton

Senior career*
Years	Team	Apps	(Gls)
2010–2017	Everton	34	(1)
2013	→ Barnechea (loan)	1	(0)
2016	→ Unión La Calera (loan)	6	(0)
2017	→ Unión La Calera (loan)	1	(0)
2018	San Marcos	25	(0)
2019–2021	San Luis	44	(1)
2022	Trasandino	17	(1)
2023–2024	San Luis	46	(0)
2025	Santiago Morning	25	(1)
- * Club domestic league appearances and goals as of 21 March 2026

Douglas Fabián Estay Hermosilla (Note: In this Spanish name, the first or paternal surname is Estay and the second or maternal family name is Hermosilla.) (born 25 April 1992) is a Chilean footballer who plays as a midfielder.

== Personal life ==
Douglas is the nephew of former football player Joel Estay.
