= Douglas Smith (Australian cricketer) =

Australian cricketer

Personal information
- Born: 9 October 1880; Fingal, Tasmania, Australia
- Died: 27 February 1933 (aged 52); Port Fairy, Victoria, Australia

Domestic team information
- Years: Team
- 1903-1905: Tasmania
- Source: Cricinfo, 17 January 2016

Douglas Smith (9 October 1880 – 27 February 1933) was an Australian cricketer. He played three first-class matches for Tasmania between 1903 and 1905.

== See also ==
- List of Tasmanian representative cricketers
