= Douglas Arthur James =

American academic and conservationist

Douglas Arthur James (1925–2018) served as the longest serving (1952–2016) professor at the University of Arkansas. Dr. James was known as "The Bird Man of Arkansas." As a boy in Michigan, he led field trips in elementary and junior high school. He attended the University of Michigan where he earned a master's degree in 1956 and followed by a master's degree in 1957 at the University of Illinois where he earned his Ph. D. In 1953, he became the first ornithologist from the Department of Zoology at the University of Arkansas.

As one of the leading conservationists in Arkansas during his lifetime, James helped to organize the Arkansas Audubon Society in 1955 and planned the first meeting of a group that became the Ozark Society. The Ozark Society helped to prevent the building of a dam on the Buffalo River which became the first National River of the United States Park Service. James had an initial interest in scrubland birds of northwestern Arkansas, and later studied scrubland avifauna in Africa, Belize, and Nepal. During his career, he presented more than 300 scientific research papers, and mentored 83 graduate students including 30 doctoral students.

In 1986, James and Joseph C. Neal published Arkansas Birds: Their Distribution and Abundance which discussed the distribution and abundance of 366 species of birds known to occur in Arkansas, including details related to their seasonal occurrence, habitat, nesting, and migration. See the List_of_birds_of_Arkansas for details.
