= Douglas Wijkander =

Swedish equestrian

Personal information
- Nationality: Swedish
- Born: 6 October 1918; Stockholm, Sweden
- Died: 20 January 1984 (aged 65); Stockholm, Sweden

Sport
- Sport: Equestrian

Douglas Wijkander (6 October 1918 – 20 January 1984) was a Swedish equestrian. He competed in two events at the 1956 Summer Olympics. His horse was named Bimbo.
