= Douglas Greasley =

English cricketer

Personal information
- Full name: Douglas George Greasley
- Born: 20 January 1926; East Hull, Yorkshire, England
- Died: 9 December 2011 (aged 85); Kettering, Northamptonshire, England
- Batting: Right-handed
- Bowling: Slow left-arm orthodox
- Role: Batsman

Domestic team information
- Years: Team
- 1950–1955: Northamptonshire

Career statistics
Competition	FC
Matches	55
Runs scored	1,659
Batting average	22.41
100s/50s	1/7
Top score	104*
Balls bowled	1,180
Wickets	16
Bowling average	35.81
5 wickets in innings	0
10 wickets in match	0
Best bowling	4/36
Catches/stumpings	22/–
- Source: CricketArchive, 22 June 2010

Douglas George Greasley (20 January 1926 – 9 December 2011) was a professional cricketer who played for Northamptonshire between 1950 and 1955. He was a right-handed middle-order batsman and an irregularly-used slow left-arm spin bowler.

Never a first team regular, his highest first-class score and only century came against Leicestershire when he hit 102 not out in his second season.
