= Douglas Cines =

American physician

Douglas B. Cines is an American physician. He is Professor of Medicine and Professor of Pathology and Laboratory Medicine, Perelman School of Medicine at the University of Pennsylvania, where he also is Director of the Coagulation Laboratory.

== Biography ==
Cines graduated from New York University (A.B. History, Pre Med) 1968 and earned at M.D. from New York University School of Medicine in 1972. His postgraduate training included an internship (1972-1973) and residency (1973-1975) at North Carolina Memorial Hospital, UNC Medical Center, and a fellowship in hematology and oncology, Hospital of the University of Pennsylvania (1975-1978).

He became an assistant professor of medicine there by 1979 and from that year till 1987 worked as such. In 1987 he was promoted to an associate professor of medicine and six years later became an associate professor in pathology. By 1993 he became a director of both hematology and coagulation labs in the same place and by 1999 became a co-vice chair there following by becoming a vice-chairman by 2004 for the Department of Pathology.
