= Douglas Smith (English cricketer) =

English cricketer

Douglas Maxwell Smith (14 September 1915 – November 2001) was an English cricketer active from 1938 to 1946 who played for Sussex. He was born in Cuckfield, Sussex and died in Brighton. He appeared in six first-class matches as a righthanded batsman who bowled right arm fast. He scored 55 runs with a highest score of 34 and took 19 wickets with a best performance of five for 25.
