= Douglas Alan Garrity =

American electrical engineer

Douglas Alan Garrity is an electrical engineer with Freescale Semiconductor, Inc, in Gilbert, Arizona. He was named a Fellow of the Institute of Electrical and Electronics Engineers (IEEE) in 2012 for his contributions to analog-to-digital converters for embedded applications.
