= Douglas A. Wiens =

American geophysicist

- Education: Wheaton College; Northwestern University
- Scientific career
- Fields: Geophysics
- Workplaces: Washington University in St. Louis

Douglas A. Wiens is an American geophysicist, focusing in seismology and geophysics, currently the Robert S. Brookings Distinguished Professor at Washington University in St. Louis.

== Career ==
Wiens received his bachelor's degree in physics from Wheaton College in 1980, followed by an M.A. in 1982 and a Ph.D. in geosciences from Northwestern University in 1985 under the supervision of Seth Stein. He became a faculty member at Washington University in 1984, and has held visiting positions at Australian National University, the Carnegie Institution of Washington, and the University of Tokyo. He is a fellow of the American Geophysical Union. Doug has published more than 200 papers in refereed scientific journals, and supervised 21 PhD theses. He was chair of the Washington University Department of Earth & Planetary Sciences from 2008-2013.

== Awards ==
Antarctic Service Medal of the United States, 2002

Elected Fellow of the American Geophysical Union, 2007

Robert and Bettie Cody Award in Ocean Sciences, Scripps Institution of Oceanography, 2014

Seismological Society of America Distinguished Lectureship, 2015
