= Douglas Spencer =

New Zealand Anglican priest

Douglas Gordon Spencer was an Anglican priest in New Zealand in the 20th century.

Spencer was ordained a deacon in 1937 and a priest in 1938. He was curate then vicar of Murchiston until 1944. He was at Tākaka from 1944 to 1955; and Archdeacon of Māwhera from 1956 until 1960.
