= Douglas Clarke (English cricketer) =

Danish-born English cricketer (born 1948)

Douglas Clarke (born 27 April 1948) was a Danish-born English cricketer. He was a right-handed batsman and a right-arm medium-fast bowler who played for Bedfordshire.

Douglas Clarke made a single appearance for Middlesex Second XI in 1968. He represented Bedfordshire in the Minor Counties Championship between 1972 and 1980. He made a single List A appearance for the team, during the 1977 Gillette Cup, in a match which Bedfordshire lost by a nine-wicket margin.
