= Douglas Melville =

South African water polo player (1928–2021)

Personal information
- Full name: Douglas McKenzie Melville
- Nationality: South African
- Born: 17 February 1928 Johannesburg, South Africa
- Died: 2021 (aged 92–93)

Sport
- Sport: Water polo

Douglas McKenzie Melville (17 February 1928 – 2021) was a South African water polo player. He competed in the men's tournament at the 1952 Summer Olympics. Melville died in 2021.
