= Douglas George =

English footballer

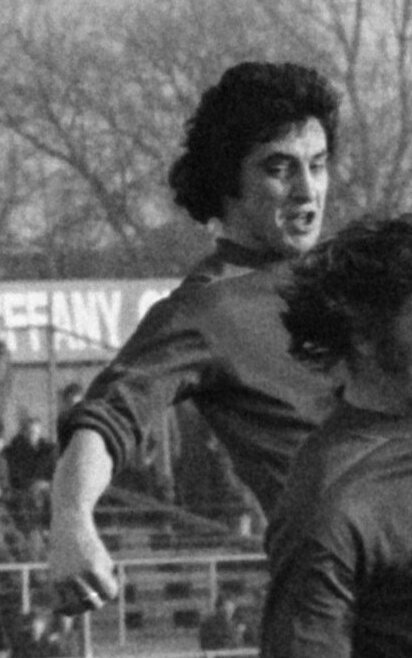
- George playing for Haarlem in 1977

Personal information
- Date of birth: 21 September 1953 (age 73)
- Place of birth: Durham, England

Youth career
- 1969–1974: Aston Villa

Senior career*
Years	Team	Apps	(Gls)
1974–1980	Haarlem		
1982–1984	Sparta Rotterdam		
- * Club domestic league appearances and goals

Douglas George (born 21 September 1953), also known as Doug George, is an English former professional footballer who played as a defender in the Netherlands for Haarlem and Sparta Rotterdam.

He began his career at the Aston Villa Academy in England, and appeared in their 1972 FA Youth Cup winning campaign. In early 1972 George scored two goals for Villa in their 5th round FA Youth Cup replay at Villa Park in a 3–0 win against Chelsea, taking them through to the quarter-finals.
