= Douglas Viegas =

Brazilian politician (born 1979)

Member of the Chamber of Deputies
- Incumbent
- Assumed office 20 December 2023
- Preceded by: Felipe Becari
- Constituency: São Paulo

Personal details
- Born: 19 June 1979 (age 47)
- Party: Brazil Union

YouTube information
- Channel: Nunca Mexa
- Subscribers: 511 thousand
- Views: 6.5 million
- Last updated: 25 December 2025

Douglas de Paulo Viegas (born 19 June 1979), also known as Poderosíssimo Ninja or Ninja, is a Brazilian politician serving as a member of the Chamber of Deputies since 2023. He previously worked as a basketball player.
