= Douglas Butcher =

English cricketer

Douglas Harry Butcher (15 May 1876 – 4 July 1945) was an English first-class cricketer active 1900–13 who played for Surrey. He was born in Mitcham; died in Wallington.
