= Douglas Cliggott =

American economist

Douglas Cliggott (born 1956) is an American banker and academic. He was formerly U.S. equity strategist at Credit Suisse, a position he was appointed to in 2009. Formerly he was the CIO of Dover Management LLC. He joined the Greenwich, Connecticut-based firm in December 2006. He later became a professor at University of Massachusetts Amherst.

== Education ==
Cliggott holds a BA in economics from the University of Massachusetts Amherst and an MA from The New School.

== Career ==
Cliggott was a managing director at J.P. Morgan & Company and JPMorgan Chase between September 1996 and February 2002.

In 2002 he left JP Morgan to head the U.S. office of Swedish asset management firm Brummer & Partners, a J.P. Morgan client. Cliggott has since returned to the University of Massachusetts Amherst as a lecturer and professor.
