= Douglas Gablinske =

American politician

Douglas W. Gablinske

Member of the Rhode Island House of Representatives from the 68th district
- In office January 2, 2007 – January 4, 2011
- Preceded by: Fausto C. Anguilla (D-68)
- Succeeded by: Richard P. Morrisson (D-68)

Personal details
- Born: February 20, 1953 (age 73)
- Party: Democratic
- Spouse: Patricia Gablinske
- Children: 2
- Education: Providence College
- Profession: Real Estate Broker/Appraiser

Douglas W. Gablinske (born 1953) was an American politician who was a member of the Rhode Island House of Representatives, representing the Democratic party for the 68th District since 2007. During the 2009-10 sessions, he served on the House Committees on Finance, Small Business, Labor, Separation of Powers and served as Chairman of the Subcommittee on Education. Gablinske was defeated in the 14 September 2010 Democratic Primary to Richard P. Morrisson, who went on to win the general election on 2 November 2010. Gablinske was successfully targeted for defeat by the Rhode Island Labor Movement for his anti-union rhetoric.
