= Douglas Husak =

American legal philosopher (born 1945)

Douglas N. Husak
- Born: June 11, 1948 (age 78); Cleveland, Ohio
- Occupations: Legal philosopher, academic and author

Academic background
- Education: B.A. M.A. Ph.D. J.D.
- Alma mater: Denison University; Ohio State University

Douglas N. Husak is an American legal philosopher, academic and author. He is a Distinguished Professor of Philosophy and co-directs the Institute for Law and Philosophy at Rutgers University.

Husak has authored over 100 scholarly articles and 6 books. He has conducted research on the intersection between moral philosophy and the substantive criminal law, focusing especially on criminalization decisions and the moral limits of the criminal sanction. Husak's books include The Philosophy of Criminal Law: Selected Essays, Overcriminalization: The Limits of the Criminal Law, Legalize This! The Case for Decriminalizing Drugs, Drugs and Rights, and Ignorance of Law.

== Education ==
Husak completed his bachelor's degree and graduated from Denison University in 1970. He then studied at Ohio State University and received his Doctoral and Juris Doctor Degrees in 1976.

== Career ==
Husak joined Rutgers University Department of Philosophy in 1977. In 2000, he was promoted as Professor II of Philosophy. At Rutgers University, Husak directs the M.A. Program in Law and Philosophy and is the co-director of the Institute for Law and Philosophy.

Husak's research is focused on all aspects of legal philosophy, especially on decisions regarding criminalization and the moral limits of the criminal sanction. He has also conducted research on the rationale for drug prohibitions.

Husak is the former Editor-in-Chief of both Criminal Law and Philosophy and Law and Philosophy.

Husak has been a visiting professor of fellow in New York University, Cambridge University, University College London, Hebrew University of Jerusalem, Fordham University and University of Michigan, among others.

== Bibliography ==
=== Books ===
- Drugs and Rights (1992) ISBN 9780521427272
- Legalize This!: The Case for Decriminalizing Drugs (2002) ISBN 978-1859843208
- The Legalization of Drugs (For and Against) (2005) ISBN 978-0521546867
- Overcriminalization: The Limits of the Criminal Law (2008) ISBN 9780195399011
- The Philosophy of Criminal Law: Selected Essays (2010) ISBN 9780199585038
- Ignorance of Law: A Philosophical Inquiry (2016) ISBN 978-0190604684

=== Selected articles ===
- Husak, D. N., & Callender, C. A. (1994). Wilful ignorance, knowledge, and the equal culpability thesis: A study of the deeper significance of the principle of legality. Wisconsin Law Review., 29.
- Husak, D. N. (1992). Why punish the deserving?. Nous, 26(4), 447–464.
- Husak, D. N. (1995). The nature and justifiability of nonconsummate offenses. Arizona Law Review, 37, 151.
- Husak, D. N., & Thomas, G. C. (1992). Date rape, social convention, and reasonable mistakes. Law and Philosophy, 11(1-2), 95–126.
- Husak, D.N. (2020). The Price of Criminal Law Skepticism: Ten Functions of the Criminal Law. New Journal of Criminal Law 27–59.
