= Douglas White Ambridge =

Canadian engineer and businessman

Douglas White Ambridge, CBE (5 January 1898 Mexico City – 16 November 1976) was a Canadian engineer and businessman.

He served in World War I. He studied at McGill University.

During the Second World War, he played an important role in industrial mobilization, particularly in shipbuilding. After the war, he was President of Abitibi Power and Paper from 1946 to 1963.
