= Douglas A. Mendini =

American dramatist

Douglas A. Mendini (1953– May 7, 2016) was an author who wrote under the pseudonym Julian Biddle, known for "What Was Hot", a history of pop culture in America, among other books.

Writing as Mendini, his non-fiction appeared in Life, Entertainment Weekly, and Country Living magazines, among others. He was also the playwright of “A Good Sport”, “Overeating Causes Death” and other plays. His fiction appeared in over 30 journals.

Mendini was born and raised in New Jersey.
