= Douglas Barrett =

Keeper of Indian Art at the British Museum

Douglas Eric Barrett, FBA (1917–1992) was a specialist in Islamic and Indian art, and was Keeper of Oriental Antiquities at the British Museum.

== About ==
Barrett was born on 10 March 1917. After reading Classics at Oxford University, Barrett was a major in the Royal Artillery, 1939–1946. He joined the British Museum in 1947, where he was assigned to the Islamic collections, and studied Arabic and Persian at the School of Oriental and African Studies, London. He later became curator of Indian art, and subsequently Keeper of the Department of Oriental Antiquities, 1969–1977, at the British Museum. Barrett was elected a fellow of the British Academy in 1976. He died in 1992.

== Selected publications ==
- (with Basil Gray) Painting of India (1963)
- Indian painting (1963)
- Sculptures from Amaravati in the British Museum (1954)
- Early Cola architecture and sculpture; 866-1014 A.D. (1974)
- Early Cola bronzes (1965)
- Painting of the Deccan, XVI-XVII century (1958)
- Sculptures from Amaravati in the British Museum (1954)
- Islamic metalwork in the British Museum (1949)

== Publications in his honour ==
- Indian art & connoisseurship : essays in honour of Douglas Barrett by John Guy (1995)
