= Douglas Natelson =

American professor of physics

Academic background
- Education: Princeton University (BSE); Stanford University (PhD)
- Doctoral advisor: Douglas Osheroff

Academic work
- Discipline: Physicist
- Institutions: Rice University

Douglas Natelson is an American physicist specializing in experimental condensed matter physics, with a focus on nanoscale systems. He is the Harry Carothers Wiess Professor of Physics at Rice University, where he also serves as Associate Dean for Research in the Wiess School of Natural Sciences. Additionally, Natelson holds courtesy appointments in the departments of Electrical and Computer Engineering and Materials Science and Nanoengineering.

== Education ==
Douglas Natelson earned his Bachelor of Science in engineering (BSE) in Mechanical and Aerospace Engineering from Princeton University in 1993, graduating summa cum laude. He also obtained a certificate in Engineering Physics. He then pursued a Ph.D. in experimental condensed matter physics at Stanford University, completing his doctoral studies in 1998 under the supervision of Douglas Osheroff, a Nobel laureate in Physics. His dissertation focused on the dielectric, acoustic, and thermal properties of tunneling two-level systems in glasses at ultralow temperatures.

== Career ==
Following his Ph.D., Natelson worked as a postdoctoral researcher at Bell Laboratories from 1998 to 2000, where he investigated nanoscale transport and device physics. In 2000, he joined the faculty at Rice University as an assistant professor in the Department of Physics and Astronomy. He was promoted to associate professor in 2006 and full professor in 2010.

Natelson has held multiple leadership roles at Rice, including serving as Chair of the Department of Physics and Astronomy from 2016 to 2022. In 2022, he briefly served as Interim Vice President for Research at Rice. He currently holds the title of Harry Carothers Wiess Professor of Physics and serves as Associate Dean for Research in the Wiess School of Natural Sciences. Additionally, he has appointments in the Departments of Electrical and Computer Engineering and Materials Science and Nanoengineering.

His research focuses on nanoscale condensed matter physics, including electronic transport, plasmonics, strong electron correlations, and molecular electronics.

Besides his academic and research contributions, Natelson has engaged in science communication through his blog, Nanoscale Views, where he discusses nanoscience and physics topics. He is also the author of the textbook Nanostructures and Nanotechnology.

== Awards ==
His work has been recognized with numerous honors, including a Sloan Research Fellowship, a Packard Fellowship, and a National Science Foundation (NSF) CAREER Award. Natelson is also a Fellow of the American Physical Society (APS) and the American Association for the Advancement of Science (AAAS).
