= Douglas K. Hartman =

American scholar

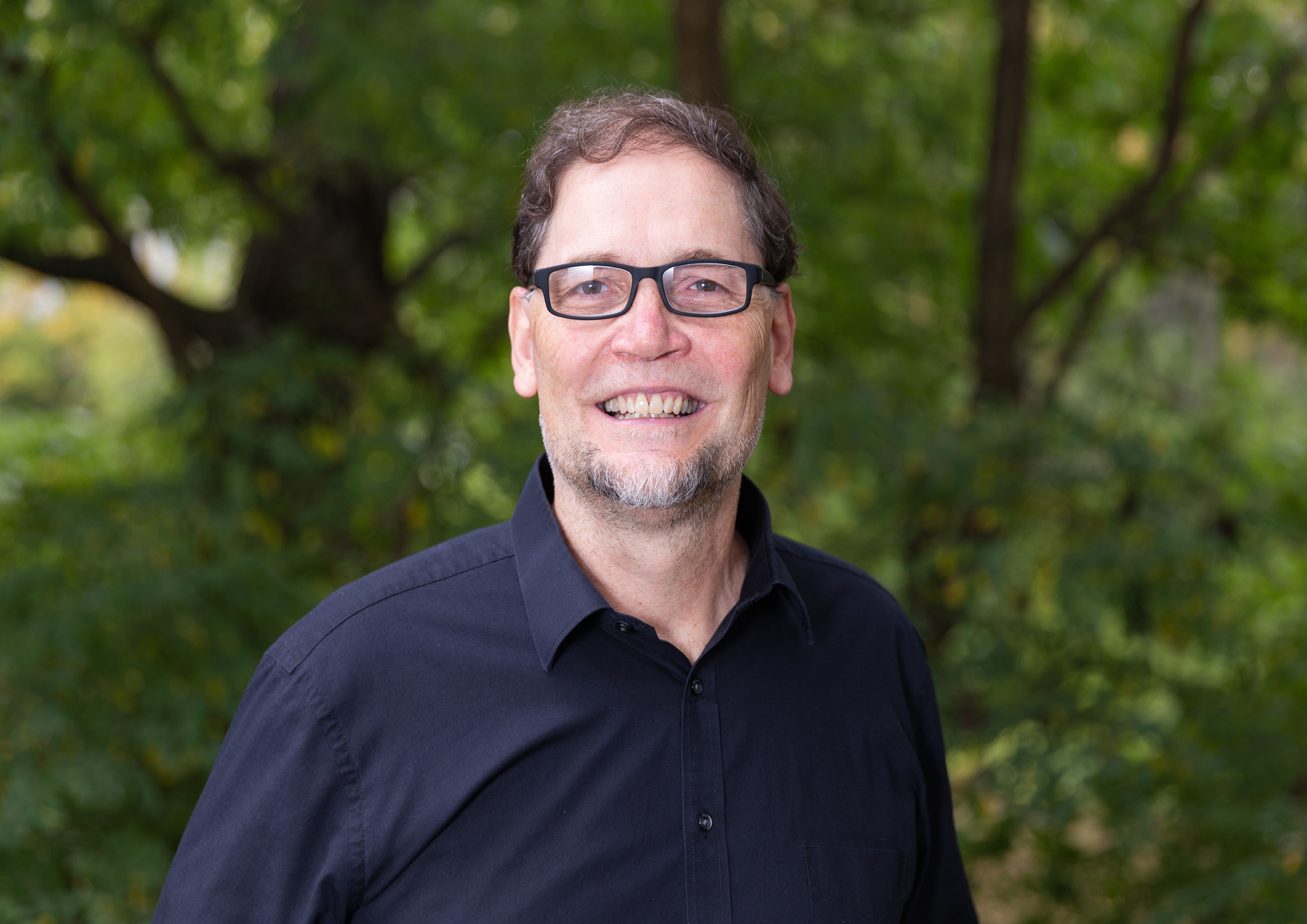
- Occupations: Educational Researcher and Professor
- Known for: Artificial intelligence in education, digital literacy, teacher preparation, and global learning initiatives.

Academic background
- Education: Ph.D. in Language & Literacy
- Alma mater: University of Illinois, Urbana-Champaign

Douglas K. Hartman is an American educational researcher and professor at Michigan State University. He specializes in artificial intelligence in education, digital literacies, teacher preparation, and global learning initiatives. Hartman holds appointments in the College of Education's departments of Teacher Education and Educational Psychology.

== Education ==
In 1981, Hartman received a B.S. in Social Science from Warner Pacific University and subsequently worked as a middle school teacher and coach in Oregon and California. He earned an M.A. in literacy and language from California State University, Fresno in 1986, and a Ph.D. in language and literacy from the University of Illinois Urbana–Champaign in 1991.

== Career ==
Since the 1990s, Hartman has held faculty positions at universities in several states, including Michigan. Hartman has published 45 scholarly works, including journal articles, book chapters, and technical reports.

== Research and contributions ==
Hartman has researched literacy history. His doctoral seminars have examined primary-source artifacts related to the history of literacy in the Midwest and New England.

== Selected publications ==
- Eight readers reading: The intertextual links of proficient readers reading multiple passages, Reading Research Quarterly, 520-561
- Research on instruction and assessment in the new literacies of online reading comprehension, DJ Leu, J Coiro, J Castek, DK Hartman, LA Henry, D Reinking, Comprehension instruction: Research-based best practices 2, 321-346
- Intertextuality and reading: The text, the reader, the author, and the context., Linguistics and education 4, 295-311
