= Douglas M. Branson =

American law professor

Douglas M. Branson holds the W. Edward Sell Chair in Business Law at the University of Pittsburgh, Pittsburgh, Pennsylvania, USA. He is a specialist in corporate law, corporate governance, finance, mergers and acquisitions, and securities law.

== Early life and education ==
Branson was raised on a farm in Ohio, and graduated from the University of Notre Dame in economics, received his Juris Doctor from Northwestern University, and completed the Master of Laws at the University of Virginia. Between undergraduate and law schools, he served nearly 3 years as an officer in the United States Navy, including a year in combat, as an advisor to Vietnamese coastal patrol forces and as a boarding officer along the Vietnamese coast.

== Career ==
Branson co-taught offerings in directors’ and officers’ duties and corporate governance from 1994 to 2009, University of Melbourne (Australia), and he remains a permanent Senior Fellow of its Faculty of Law. He has been a U.S. Department of State sponsored consultant on corporate law, corporate governance, and capital markets in Ukraine (twice), Serbia, Slovakia (US Steel), and the Republic of Indonesia (4 times). He has taught and consulted in Malaysia, Singapore, New Zealand (6 times), Philippines (as a consultant to the Asian Development Bank), Japan, Korea, People's Republic of China and Hong Kong (6 times), where he was the Paul Hastings Distinguished Visiting professor at the University of Hong Kong in 2006.

In 2000, he was a Fulbright Scholar at the University of Ghent in Belgium. Domestically, Professor Branson has held many distinguished chairs and visitorships, including at Cornell University, University of Oregon, Washington University in St. Louis, University of Alabama (as Charles Tweedy Distinguished Professor in 1993 and again in 2003), and the University of Washington (as Condon-Falknor Distinguished Professor in 2010).

He has been featured in the New York Times, Washington Post, Chicago Tribune, Wall Street Journal, Dallas Morning News, Conference Board Magazine, New Republic, Director and Officer, and many other publications.

Branson has been admitted to the state bars of Pennsylvania, Ohio, Illinois and Washington, and to the United States Supreme Court, as well as to various other U.S. federal trial and appellate courts. He has been an expert witness-consultant in approximately 125 major cases in 30 U.S. jurisdictions. These cases include WorldCom, Freddie Mac, Adelphia Communications, Berkshire Hathaway and myriad smaller and medium-sized disputes. He has also been a consultant in 200 or so major corporate transactions or evolutions.

== Publications ==
Branson is the author of 15 books, including the first US treatise on corporate governance (1993)(with annual supplements), Understanding Corporate Law (3rd ed 2009), a text used in Japan, China and elsewhere, as well as in the U.S., and Business Enterprises (2009)(with J. Heminway et al.). His latest books include several concerning diversity in corporate governance, including No Seat at the Table – How Governance and Law Keep Women Out of the Boardroom (2007) and The Last Male Bastion – Gender and the CEO Suite at America’s Public Companies (2010). Branson also is the author of over seventy articles in legal periodicals such as the Cornell Law Review, Northwestern Law Review, Tulane Law Review, Vanderbilt Law Review, and many others. His other books include a book about his Vietnam experience in the “Brown Water Navy,” as well as another about professional licensure and service as an expert witness. Other of his legal volumes include Questions and Answers about Business Associations (2d ed 2011), Problems in Corporate Governance (1997), and the Russell Sage Handbook of Corporate Governance (2011)(w. Thomas Clarke).
