= Douglas Mata =

American pathologist

Douglas Alexander Mata
- Education: Memorial Sloan Kettering Cancer Center (molecular genetic pathology); Harvard Medical School (anatomic and clinical pathology)
- Alma mater: Baylor College of Medicine (M.D.); University of Cambridge (M.Phil.); Rice University (B.A.)
- Occupations: Pathologist and epidemiologist
- Awards: Fulbright Scholar; Altmetric Top 100 Articles of 2017

Douglas Alexander Mata is an American pathologist and epidemiologist currently at Foundation Medicine, Inc. in Cambridge, Massachusetts, known for his contributions to molecular pathological epidemiology and neuropsychiatric epidemiology. His textbook Statistics for Pathologists is a reference text in pathology medical education and his meta-analytical studies on physician mental health have circulated widely in the popular press.
