= Douglass Sullivan-Gonzalez =

American historian (born 1956)

Douglass Sullivan-Gonzalez (born 1956) is a researcher, writer, and professor of Central American history, particularly in the 19th century. He is the author of Piety, Power and Politics: Religion and National Formation in Guatemala, 1821-1871. He co-edited, with Charles Reagan Wilson, The South and the Caribbean (University Press of Mississippi, 2001).

== Career ==
Sullivan-Gonzalez attended Samford University, where he earned a BA. He earned a Master of Divinity and Master of Theology from the Princeton Theological Seminary. From 1984 to 1986, he taught church history and social ethics at the Nicaraguan baptist seminary in Managua, Nicaragua. He then attended the University of Texas at Austin, where he earned a Phd in Latin American History.

Sullivan-Gonzalez became an associate professor in the College of Liberal Arts at the University of Mississippi in 1993. He was a visiting professor at Tulane University from 1999 to 2000. In 2002, he was appointed interim dean of the Sally McDonnell Barksdale Honors College, later being promoted to the permanent position in 2003. He held this position until 2021. Under his tenure, the size of the Honors College student body quadrupled. A fundraiser was held in his name.

He returned to the history department in 2021.

He is also known as "DSG".

== Publications ==
- Rivas, Edelberto Torres (1993). History and Society in Central America. Translated by Sullivan-Gonzalez, Douglass. Austin, Texas: University of Texas Press. ISBN 9780292781313.
- Sullivan-Gonzalez, Douglass (1998). Piety, Power, and Politics: Religion and Nation Formation in Guatemala, 1821–1871. Pittsburgh, Pennsylvania: University of Pittsburgh Press. ISBN 9780822940579.
- Sullivan-Gonzalez, Douglass; Wilson, Charles Reagan, eds. (2001). The South and the Caribbean. Oxford, Mississippi: University Press of Mississippi. ISBN 9781934110379.
- Sullivan-Gonzalez, Douglass (2016). The Black Christ of Esquipulas: Religion and Identity in Guatemala. Lincoln, Nebraska: University of Nebraska Press. ISBN 9780803280946.
