= Douglas A. Ross =

Canadian political scientist

Douglas A. Ross (born 1948) is a Canadian political scientist specializing in international relations, specifically Canadian foreign and defense policies, nuclear strategy, and arms control. He is currently Professor of Political Science at Simon Fraser University. Having obtained his BA in political science and economics, he went on to receive an MA and PhD in political science, all from the University of Toronto. His PhD thesis, completed under the supervision of the former Canadian diplomat John Wendell Holmes, was subsequently published as In the Interests of Peace: Canada and Vietnam, 1954–1973. It is widely considered the most comprehensive and authoritative account of Canadian foreign policy with regard to the Vietnam War.

In addition to his academic work, Ross is also a regular commentator on international relations for the media and an occasional advisor to the Canadian government. He was a founding director of the Canadian Centre for Arms Control and Disarmament in 1983, and served on the national policy advisory group for the Canadian Ambassadors for Disarmament from 1986 to 1993. Ross has been the Executive Director of Simon Fraser University's Canadian American Strategic Review since 2003. He is currently engaged in research for an upcoming study of Canadian-American relations with regard to nuclear weapons.

== Selected bibliography ==
- In the Interests of Peace: Canada and Vietnam, 1954–1973 (Toronto, New York, and London: University of Toronto Press, 1984).
- Coping with 'Star Wars': Issues for Canada and the Alliance (Ottawa: Canadian Centre for Arms Control and Disarmament, 1985).
- Superpower Maritime Strategy in the Pacific (London and New York: Routledge, 1990) edited with Frank C. Langdon.
- Pacific Security 2010: Canadian Perspectives on Pacific Security into the 21st century (Ottawa: Canadian Centre for Arms Control and Disarmament, 1991) edited with Mary L. Goldie.
- The Dilemmas of American Strategic Primacy: Implications for the Future of Canadian-American Cooperation (Toronto: Royal Canadian Military Institute, 2005) edited with David S. McDonough.

== See also ==
- Nuclear Weapons
- Vietnam War
- John Wendell Holmes
