= Douglas Blackwell (bishop) =

Canadian Anglican bishop (1938–2022)

Douglas Charles Blackwell (June 3, 1938 – May 25, 2022) was a Canadian Anglican bishop. He was suffragan bishop of the Anglican Diocese of Toronto in the Anglican Church of Canada from 1988 to 2003.

Blackwell was educated at Wycliffe College, Toronto and ordained in 1964. After a curacy in Calgary, he held incumbencies at Cochrane and North Battleford. He was Archdeacon of Saskatchewan from 1973 to 1974 when he came to the Diocese of Toronto, firstly as Executive Assistant to Bishop Lewis Garnsworthy and then as a suffragan bishop in the diocese.
