= Douglas Clark (sculptor) =

American sculptor

Douglas Clark is an American sculptor. Native to Edna, Texas, he grew up near Port Arthur. He resides in McAllen, Texas, where, in an old church, he researches and creates representational pieces in bronze.

His work includes portrayals of several notable people, as well as symbolic animals or figures. For Port Arthur he sculpted a number of busts of Janis Joplin as part of the memorial to her.

He has a number of works around the city of McAllen, such as a stallion at the Memorial High and a soldier at the Veterans War Memorial of Texas. His bust of Leo Pena, councilman, is placed in the Leo Pena Memorial Park in Mission City, Texas. For the city of Miami Beach, Florida, he created a 50-foot memorial to the victims of the Holocaust.
