= Douglas B. Marshall =

American industrialist and rancher (1917–2007)

Douglas B. Marshall (October 21, 1917 – September 27, 2007) was an American industrialist and rancher with his wife, Margaret Cullen Marshall (February 25, 1921 – February 16, 1993) of Gleannloch Farms Arabian horses.

Through importation, breeding and showing of Egyptian Arabian horses, the Marshalls were instrumental in the perpetuation of the straight Egyptian Arabian horse, in the United States and throughout the world. Douglas and Margaret Marshall bred, owned or imported 1032 purebred Arabians from 1962 through 1992, with Gleannloch Farms Arabian horses winning 2,078 championships and 89 U.S. and Canadian national titles.
