= Douglas Adams (painter) =

British painter (1853–1920)

- Born: 1853
- Died: 1920 (aged 66–67)
- Known for: Landscape Painting

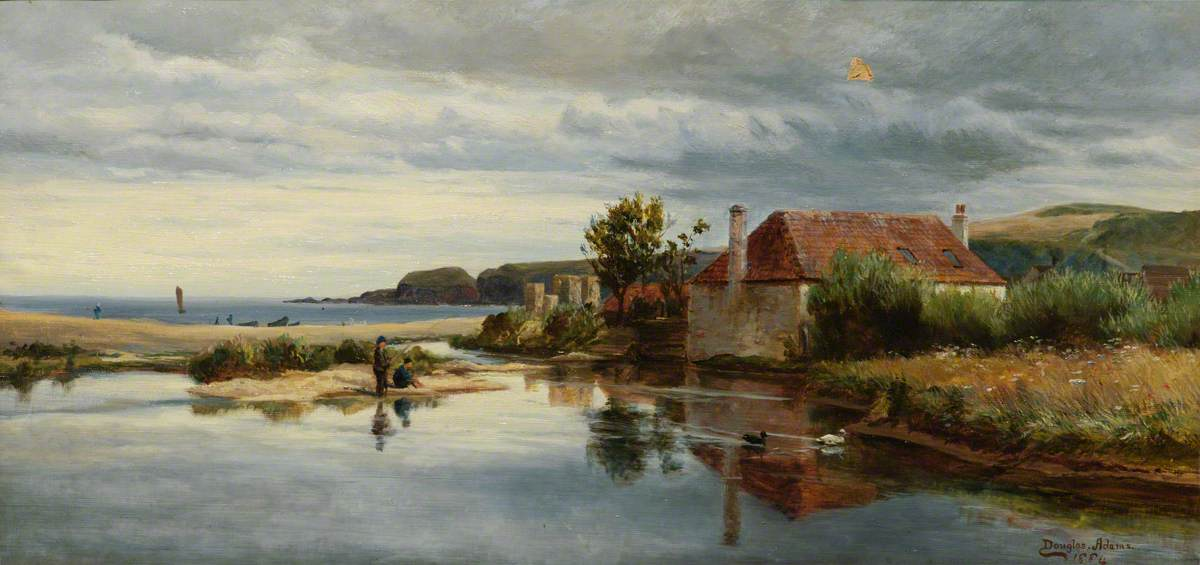
The Old Sawmill, Stonehaven, by Douglas Adams (1884)

Douglas Adams (1853 – 1920) was a British painter based in London who specialised in landscape paintings.

== Art ==
Adams mainly worked in landscapes of Scottish subjects, painting highland and coastal scenes. He would exhibit from 1880 to around 1894 including in the Royal Academy, the Suffolk Street Gallery and the New Gallery.

Many of Adams' paintings were sold as prints by publisher Thomas McLean.
