= Douglas Osborne =

- Born: Douglas Hugh Osborne; 19 July 1952 Thames, New Zealand

Rugby union career
- Position: wing
International career
Years	Team	Apps	(Points)
1975	Wallabies	3	(4)

Douglas Hugh Osborne (born 19 July 1952) was a rugby union player who represented Australia.

Osborne, a wing, was born in Thames and claimed a total of 3 international rugby caps for Australia.
