= Douglas R. MacFarlane =

Australian chemist (born 1957)

- Born: Carrickfergus, Northern Ireland

Douglas Robert MacFarlane FRS is an Australian chemist, author and researcher. He is known for his contributions to the development of ionic liquids and the development of a sustainable method of synthesizing ammonia.

== Education and career ==
MacFarlane graduated with a Bachelor of Science (Hons), First Class in Chemistry and a Bachelor of Arts in 1979 from Victoria University of Wellington. He did his doctoral research under the supervision of Professor C. Austen Angell at Purdue University, graduating Ph.D. in 1982. He returned to Victoria University of Wellington to carry out postdoctoral research in December 1982.

In late 1983, he joined Monash University's School of Chemistry as a Lecturer; he was appointed Professor of Chemistry in 1995 and a Sir John Monash Distinguished Professor in 2019. MacFarlane is also an Honorary Professor of Queens University Belfast.

He has made substantial contributions to the development of ionic liquids, and he was co-author with Jennifer Pringle and Mega Kar of the textbook Fundamentals of Ionic Liquids: From Chemistry to Applications.

In 2021 MacFarlane co-founded, with co-worker A/Prof Alexandr Simonov, spin-out company Jupiter Ionics Pty/Ltd to scale up the green ammonia synthesis technology that their group has discovered.

== Honours and awards ==
In 2007 MacFarlane was elected a Fellow of the Australian Academy of Science. In 2018 he was awarded their David Craig Medal and Lecture for contributions to the field of chemistry. In 2009 he was elected a Fellow of the Australian Academy of Technology and Engineering. He was the Royal Society of Chemistry Australasian Lecturer in 2015. MacFarlane received the 2018 Victoria Prize for Science and Innovation. he was elected Fellow of the International Society for Electrochemistry in 2019. His group was awarded the Royal Society of Chemistry's 2023 Horizon Prize for Environment, Sustainability and Energy in the same year. He received the Max Bredig Award of the Electrochemistry Society in 2024. He has been listed as a Clarivate Highly Cited Author since 2020. He was elected a Fellow of the Royal Society in 2024.
