= Douglas Fyfe =

English cricketer

Personal information
- Full name: Douglas Monro Fyfe
- Born: 4 November 1824; Tanjore, Madras Presidency, British India
- Died: 25 February 1871 (aged 46); Westminster, London, England
- Batting: Unknown

Domestic team information
- Years: Team
- 1866–1869: Marylebone Cricket Club

Career statistics
Competition	First-class
Matches	5
Runs scored	60
Batting average	7.50
100s/50s	–/–
Top score	31
Catches/stumpings	2/–
- Source: Cricinfo, 2 June 2021

Douglas Monro Fyfe (4 November 1824 – 25 February 1871) was an English first-class cricketer.

Fyfe was born in British India at Tanjore in November 1824. A keen cricketer, he played first-class cricket on five occasions, making two appearances during the Canterbury Festival of 1866, playing for the Gentlemen of the South against I Zingari and for the Marylebone Cricket Club (MCC) against the Gentlemen of Kent. He later made three further first-class appearances for the MCC, against Oxford University in 1868 and twice against Hampshire in 1869. Fyfe scored a total of 60 runs across his five matches, with a highest score of 31. In addition to playing at first-class level, he also played for a number of amateur sides across England, Scotland and Wales. Fyfe was resident at Maidenhead in Berkshire, where he served as an adjutant with the 19th Regiment of Berks Volunteers. He had an invention patented in the London Gazette in May 1863 which contributed to "improvements in the means or apparatus employed for raising, removing, transporting, and refixing military or other targets or mantlets". Fyfe died at Westminster in February 1871.
