= Douglas Young (cricketer) =

English cricketer

Personal information
- Full name: Douglas Edmund Young
- Born: 17 May 1917; Wandsworth, London, England
- Died: 27 December 1995 (aged 78); Exeter, Devon, England
- Batting: Right-handed
- Bowling: Leg break

Domestic team information
- Years: Team
- 1953–1959: Berkshire
- 1938–1939: Oxford University

Career statistics
Competition	First-class
Matches	20
Runs scored	442
Batting average	17.68
100s/50s	–/–
Top score	36
Balls bowled	2,878
Wickets	50
Bowling average	27.48
5 wickets in innings	2
10 wickets in match	–
Best bowling	6/58
Catches/stumpings	16/–
- Source: Cricinfo, 22 November 2011

Douglas Edmund Young (7 May 1917 – 27 December 1995) was an English cricketer. Young was a right-handed batsman who bowled leg break. He was born at Wandsworth, London and educated at King's College School, Wimbledon.

While studying at Brasenose College, Oxford, Young made his first-class debut for Oxford University Cricket Club against Glamorgan in 1938. He made nineteen further first-class appearances for the university, the last of which came against the Marylebone Cricket Club in 1939. He was awarded a Blue in 1938 but in 1939 he played right up the University Match but was left out of the side for the actual game, when he was twelfth man.

In his 20 first-class appearances, Young scored 442 runs at an average of 17.68, with a high score of 36. It was though with the ball that he stood out, taking 50 wickets at a bowling average of 27.48, with best figures of 6/58. One of two five wicket hauls he took, these figures came against Lancashire in 1938.

Following World War II, Young played second XI cricket for Surrey, though could not force his way into their first team. In 1953 he joined Berkshire, making his debut against Cornwall in the Minor Counties Championship. He played Minor counties cricket for Berkshire from 1953 to 1959, making 49 appearances.

He died at Exeter, Devon on 27 December 1995.
