= Douglas Hardcastle =

English footballer

Personal information
- Full name: Douglas Scott Hardcastle
- Date of birth: 1886
- Place of birth: Worksop, England
- Date of death: 9 May 1915 (aged 29)
- Place of death: Hainaut, Belgium
- Position: Inside left

Senior career*
Years	Team	Apps	(Gls)
- Worksop Town
1905	Derby County	5	(1)
- Worksop Town
- * Club domestic league appearances and goals

Douglas Scott Hardcastle (1886 – 9 May 1915) was an English professional footballer who played as an inside left in the Football League for Derby County.

== Personal life ==
Hardcastle worked as a stove grate patternmaker. He served as an appointed lance corporal in the Sherwood Foresters during the First World War and was killed in action on the Western Front on 9 May 1915. Hardcastle is commemorated on the Ploegsteert Memorial.

== Career statistics ==
Appearances and goals by club, season and competition
Club	Season	League			FA Cup		Total	
Club	Season	Division	Apps	Goals	Apps	Goals	Apps	Goals
Derby County	1905–06	First Division	5	1	1	0	6	1
Career total			5	1	1	0	6	1
