= Douglas Moffat (cricketer) =

English cricketer

Douglas Moffat (31 July, 1843 – 27 March, 1922) was an English first-class cricketer active 1863–64 who played for Middlesex and Marylebone Cricket Club (MCC). He was born in Cawnpore and died in Notting Hill. He played in two first-class matches.
