= Southeastern United States =

Eastern portion of the Southern United States

Coordinates: 34°N 85°W

- Region
- American Southeast, the Southeast
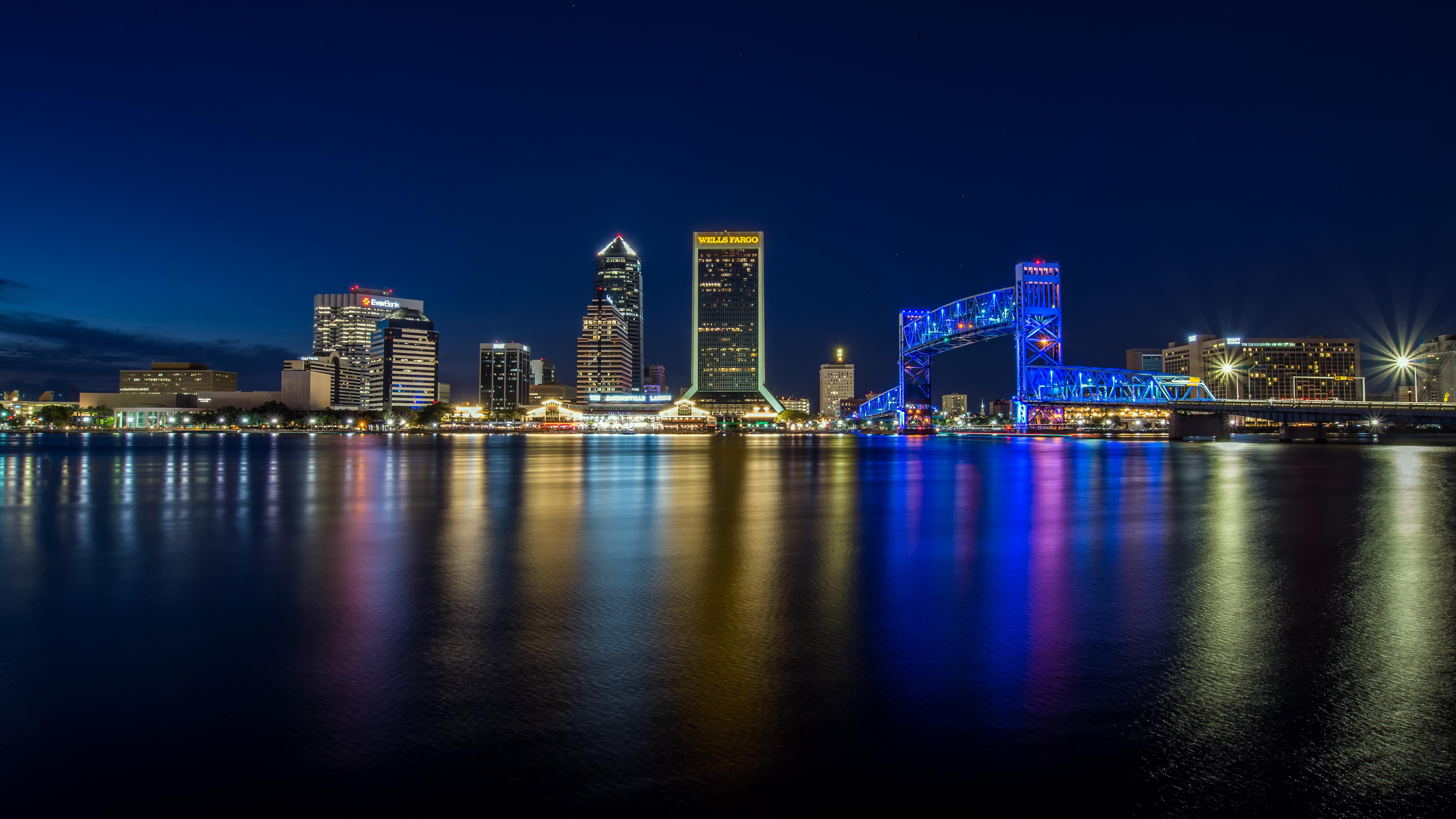
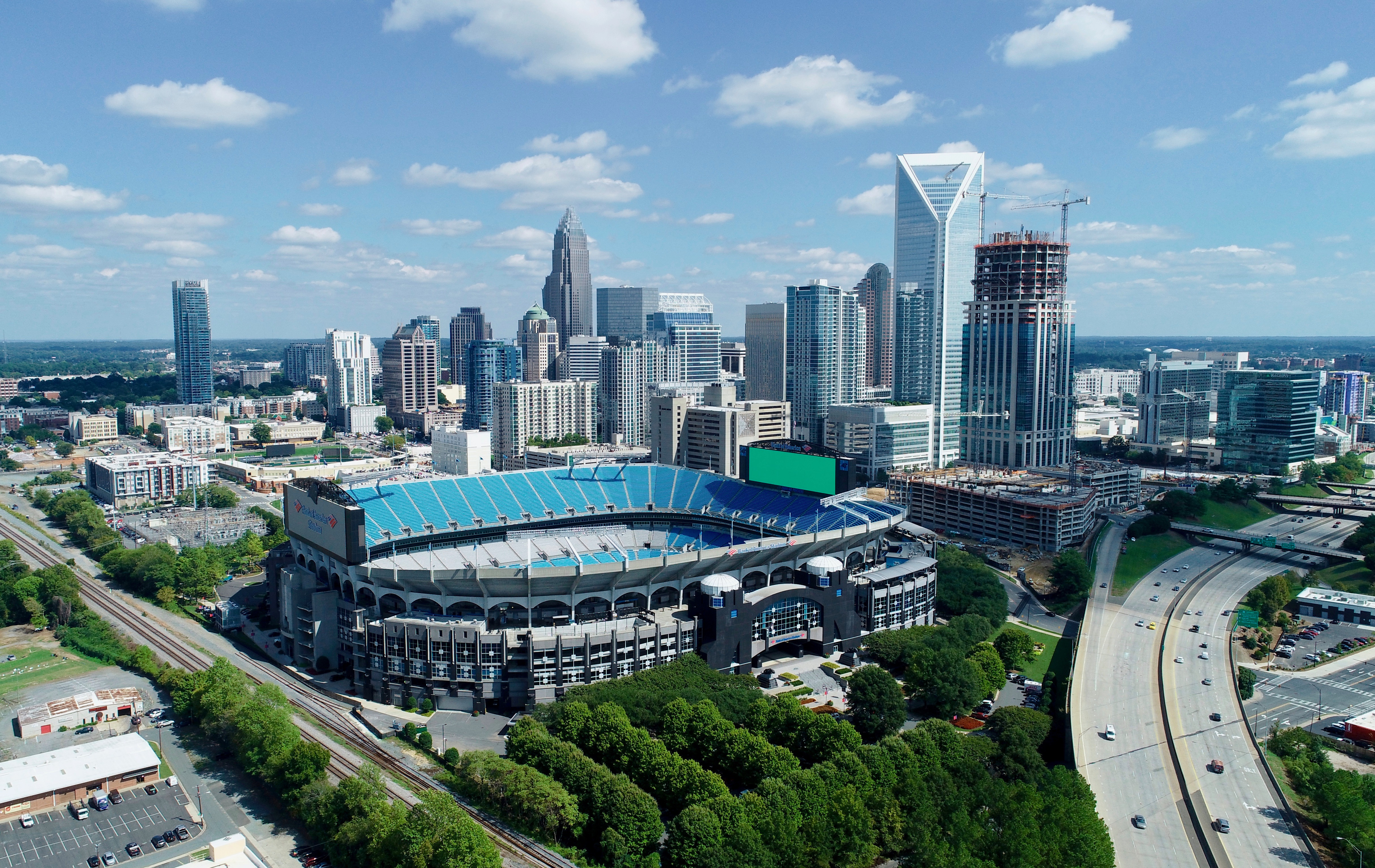
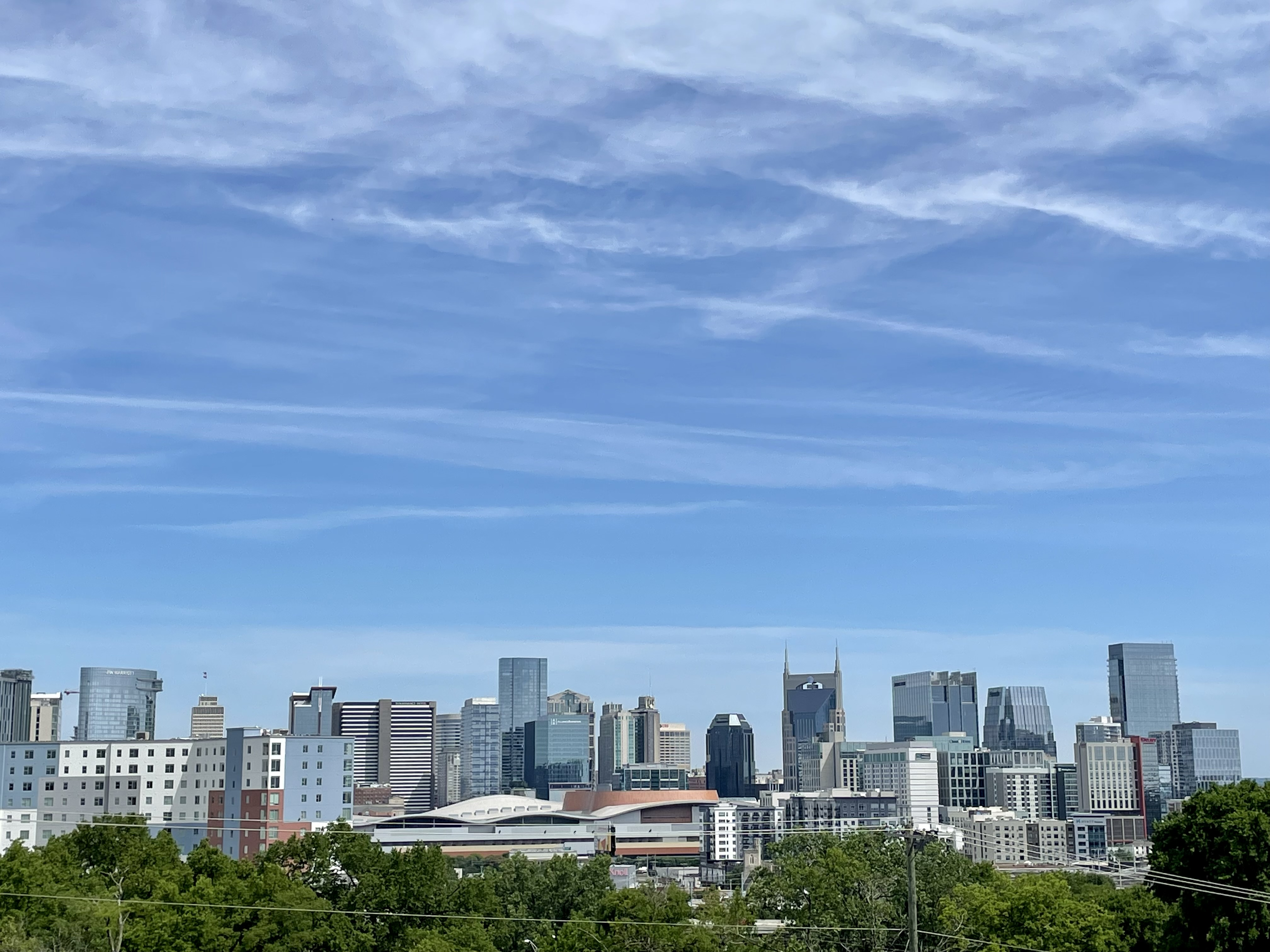
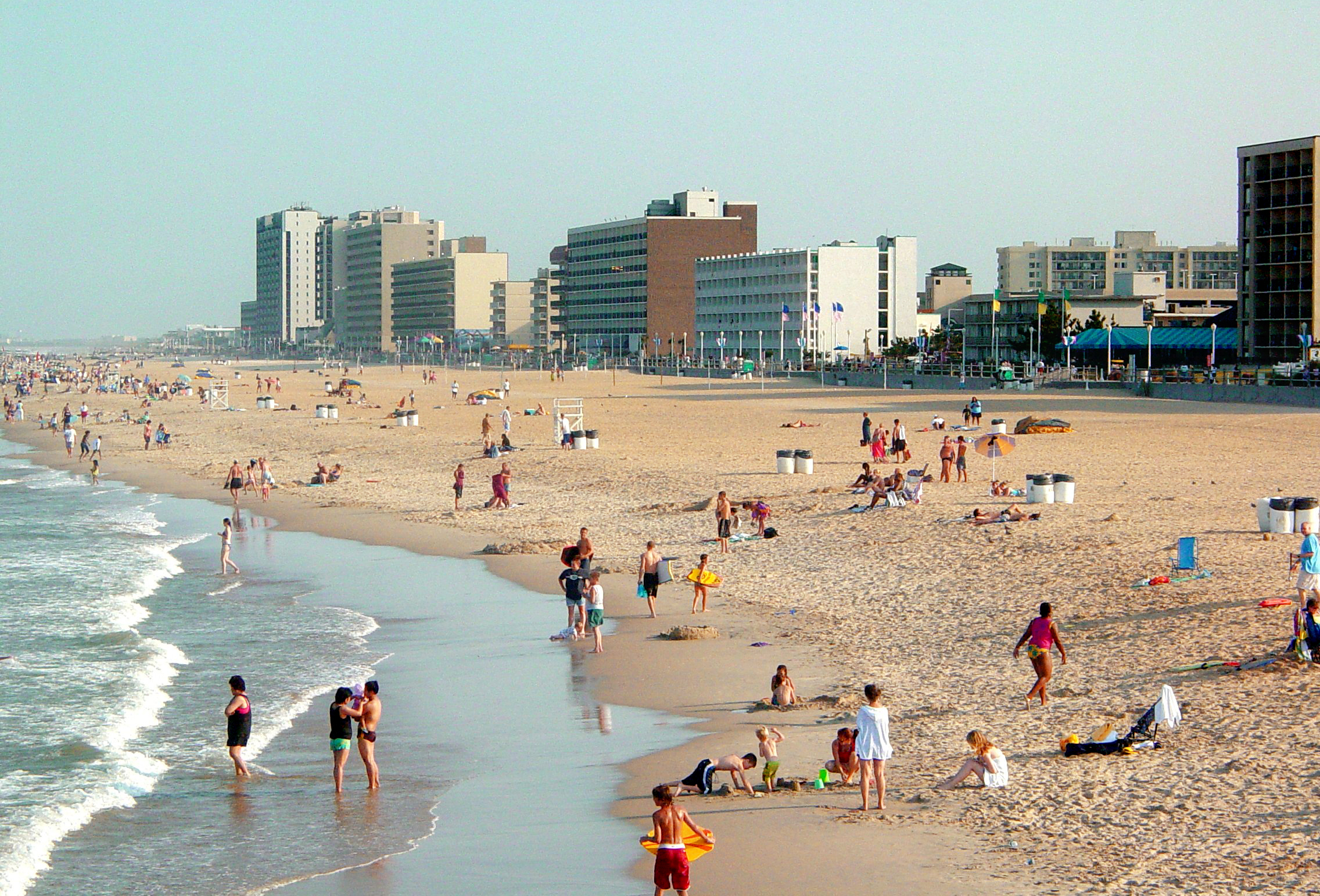
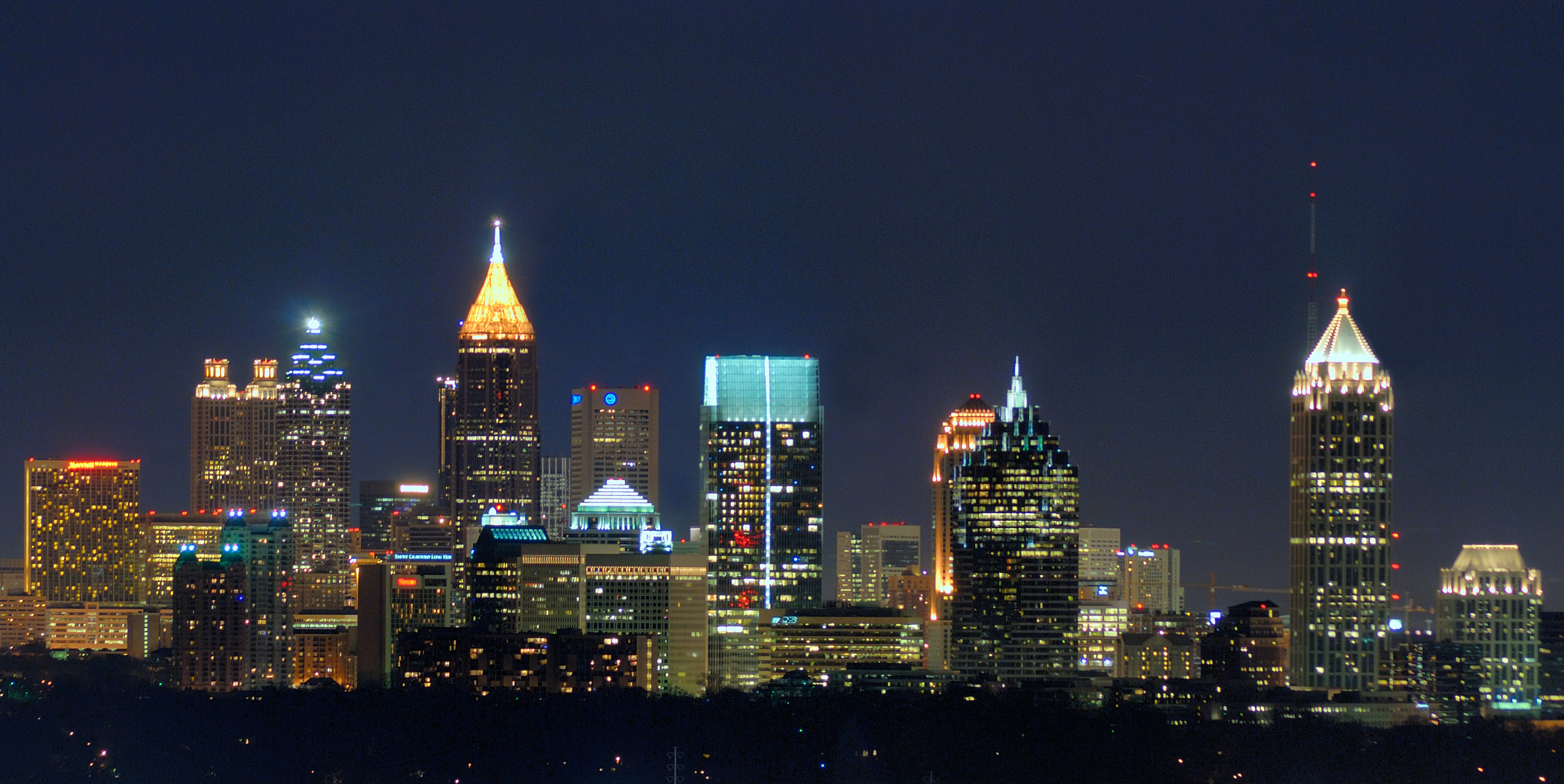
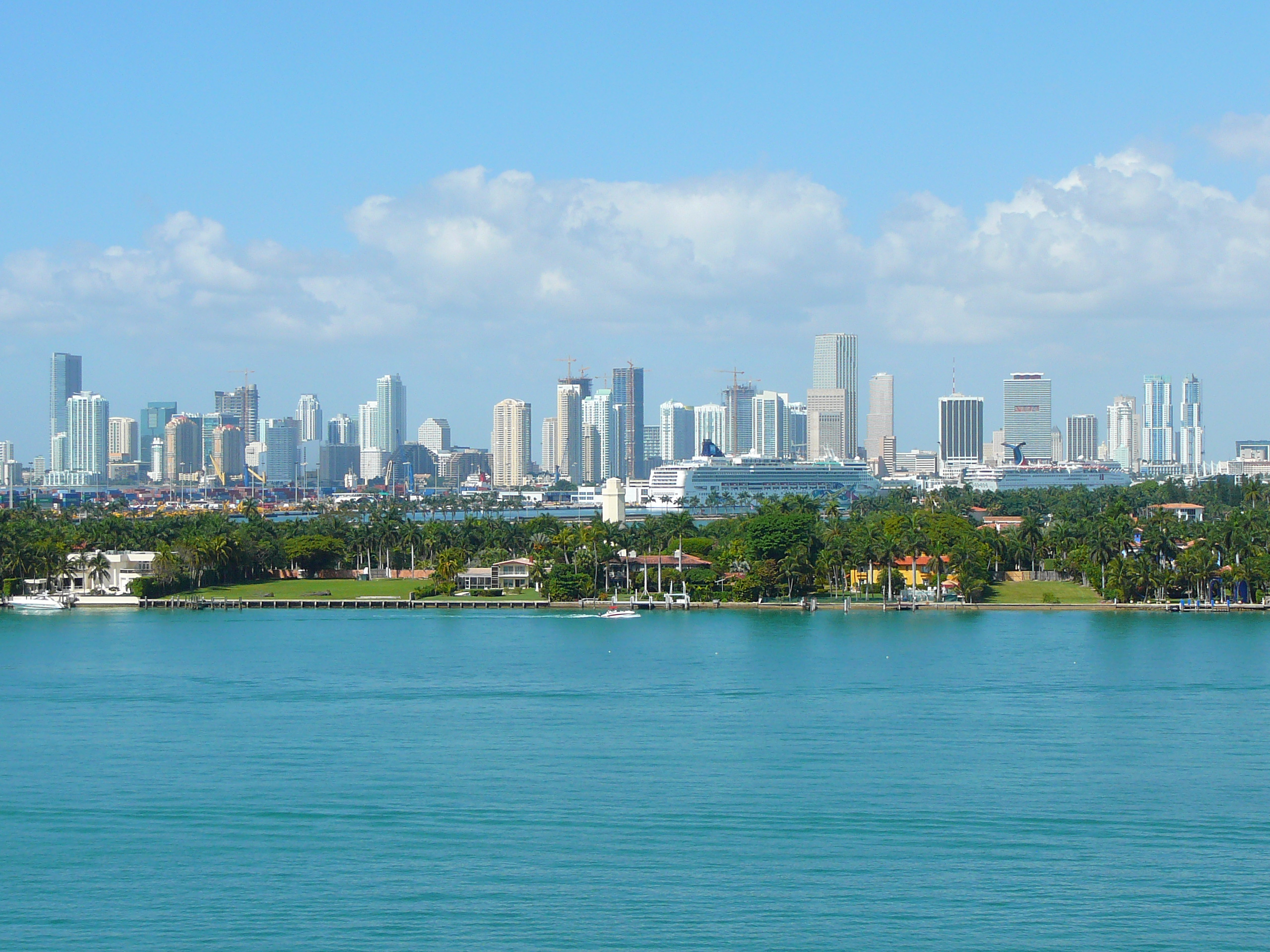
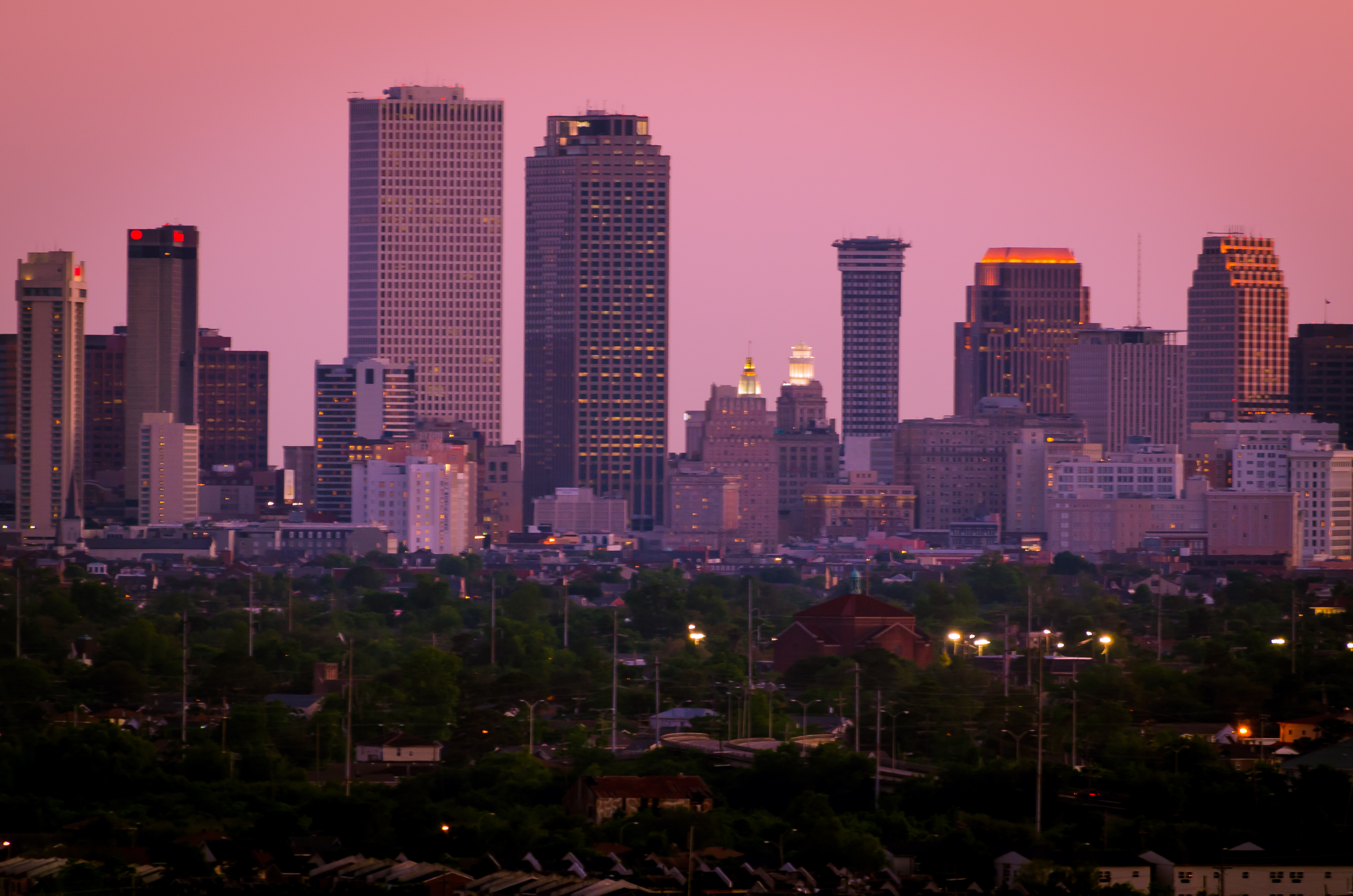
- Images from top to bottom: Jacksonville, Charlotte, Nashville, Virginia Beach, Atlanta, Miami, and New Orleans

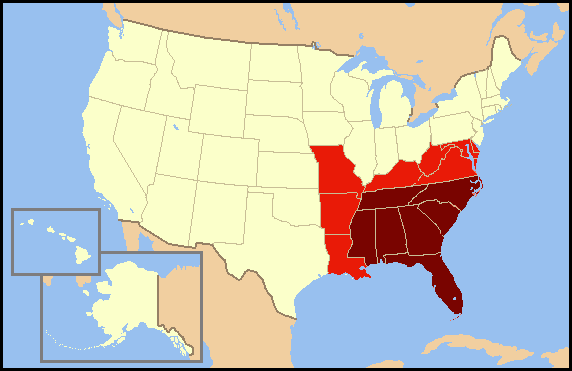
- A map of the United States with the Southeastern United States (in dark red) and states less frequently but sometimes considered part of the region (in light red)
- Largest cities: Jacksonville; Charlotte; Washington, D.C.; Nashville; Memphis; Louisville; Baltimore; Atlanta; Virginia Beach; Raleigh; Miami; New Orleans; Tampa
- States: Alabama; Arkansas; Delaware; Florida; Georgia; Kentucky; Louisiana; Maryland; Mississippi; North Carolina; South Carolina; Tennessee; Virginia; West Virginia
- Largest metropolitan areas: Metro Atlanta; Charlotte metropolitan area; Greater Miami; Washington metropolitan area; Hampton Roads; Tampa Bay area; Baltimore metropolitan area; Greater Orlando; Nashville metropolitan area; Metro Jacksonville; Memphis metropolitan area

Area
  - Total: 580,835 sq mi (1,504,360 km^{2})
  - Land: 540,511 sq mi (1,399,920 km^{2})
  - Water: 40,324 sq mi (104,440 km^{2}) 6.9%

Population (2018)
  - Total: 97,438,243 (Note: Excludes Puerto Rico and the U.S. Virgin Islands)
  - Density: 150.5/sq mi (58.1/km^{2})
- Time zone: EST (UTC-5)/CST (UTC-6); AST (UTC-4) in PR and VI
  - Summer (DST): EDT (UTC-4)/CDT (UTC-5); No DST in PR and VI

The Southeastern United States, also known as the American Southeast or simply the Southeast, is a geographical region of the United States located in the eastern portion of the Southern United States and the southern portion of the Eastern United States. The region includes a core of states that reaches north to Maryland and West Virginia, bordering the Ohio River and Mason–Dixon line, and stretches west to Arkansas and Louisiana. (Note: This includes Florida, Georgia, South Carolina, North Carolina, Virginia, Missouri, West Virginia, Maryland, Delaware, Washington, D.C., Kentucky, Tennessee, Mississippi, Alabama, Louisiana, and Arkansas.)

There is no official U.S. government definition for the region, and it is defined variably among agencies and organizations.

== History ==
The history of the present-day Southeastern United States dates to the dawn of civilization in approximately 11,000 BC or 13,000 BC. The earliest artifacts from the region were from the Clovis culture. Prior to the arrival of European colonialists, Native Americans occupied the region for several hundred years during the Woodland period.

The first Europeans to arrive in the region were conquistadors associated with the Spanish Empire. In 1541, Hernando de Soto journeyed through the southeast and crossed the Mississippi River. The region hosted the first permanent European settlement in the United States, with the Kingdom of Spain establishing St. Augustine, Florida in 1565. Four southeast states, Georgia, North Carolina, South Carolina, and Virginia, were among the Thirteen Colonies who sent delegates to the Second Continental Congress in Philadelphia, which declared independence from the British Crown, which was established with the colonies' victory over the British in the American Revolutionary War.

During the American Civil War, the Confederate States of America consisted of the southeastern states of Florida, Alabama, Georgia, Mississippi, Tennessee, South Carolina, North Carolina, Virginia, Louisiana, and Arkansas. Texas was a Confederate State that isn't defined as part of the southeast region. Missouri and Kentucky had dual competing Unionist and Confederate state governments in the Confederate government of Missouri and Confederate government of Kentucky, while Maryland and Delaware were neutral southern border states that remained with the Union. West Virginia split from Virginia during 1863, and also served as a border state that remained with the Union while being contested by the Confederacy and Confederate government of West Virginia. Following the Reconstruction era in the 1870s, many Southeast state legislatures passed Jim Crow laws. The American segregation era spanned from the late 19th century to the mid-1960s.

In the mid-to-late 20th century, the Southeast saw many shifting changes take place population wise and economically. The Southeast started to see a spur of new economic growth in the 1930s, which stemmed from New Deal policies such as the Tennessee Valley Authority and the Fair Labor Standards Act instituting a minimum wage for the entire nation. World War II further helped growth within the Southeast, as military bases and military production drew workers from farming or low-wage industries into a new economy. With farming mechanization picking up to speed in the 1940s, promotion of different industries, and federal spending on defense and space programs, the Southeast saw further economic transformation in the ensuing years and decades of the 20th century.

The Southeast benefitted from its business and warm climate in its population growth during the late 20th century, as it helped in attracting job seekers and retirees from other U.S. regions. Florida in particular went from being the 27th most populated U.S. state in 1940 with 1.9 million residents, to being the 4th most populated U.S. state and having nearly 13 million residents in 2000. Southeast states such as North Carolina and Georgia saw large population growth increases as well during the late 20th century.

== Geography ==
The United States Geological Survey defines Southeastern United States as including the states of Alabama, Arkansas, Florida, Georgia, Kentucky, Louisiana, Mississippi, North Carolina, South Carolina, Tennessee and Virginia.

There is no official United States Census Bureau definition of the Southeastern United States. They instead divide a larger region which includes Texas, Oklahoma, Maryland, Delaware, Washington, D.C., and West Virginia, designated as "the South", into three separate subregions, none of which are conventionally considered to define the Southeast.

The nonprofit American Association of Geographers defines the Southeastern United States as including Alabama, Florida, Georgia, Kentucky, Maryland, Mississippi, North Carolina, South Carolina, Tennessee, Virginia, and West Virginia. The OSBO (Organization Supporting Business Owners) uses the same states, but includes Arkansas and Louisiana. The states of Delaware and Missouri, along with the U.S. capital of Washington, D.C., are also sometimes added in definitions of the term.

== Demographics ==
=== Most populous states ===
The most populous states in the region as of the 2025 United States census estimates are: Florida (23,462,518), followed by Georgia (11,732,595), and North Carolina (11,197,968).

State	2025 estimate	2020 census	Change	Land area	Density
Alabama	5,193,088	5,032,962	+3.18%	50,645 sq mi (131,171 km^{2})	102.5/sq mi (39.6/km^{2})
Arkansas (Note: Arkansas, Kentucky, Louisiana, Maryland, Virginia and West Virginia are often labeled in other regional sections of the United States. However, since they are also often included in the Southeastern U.S. definition, they are listed here.)	3,114,791	3,014,399	+3.33%	52,035 sq mi (134,771 km^{2})	59.9/sq mi (23.1/km^{2})
Florida	23,462,518	21,591,325	+8.67%	53,625 sq mi (138,887 km^{2})	437.5/sq mi (168.9/km^{2})
Georgia	11,302,748	10,732,595	+5.31%	57,513 sq mi (148,959 km^{2})	196.5/sq mi (75.9/km^{2})
Kentucky	4,606,864	4,508,271	+2.19%	39,486 sq mi (102,269 km^{2})	116.7/sq mi (45.0/km^{2})
Louisiana	4,618,189	4,652,145	−0.73%	43,204 sq mi (111,898 km^{2})	106.9/sq mi (41.3/km^{2})
Maryland	6,265,347	6,178,387	+1.41%	12,407 sq mi (32,134 km^{2})	505.0/sq mi (195.0/km^{2})
Mississippi	2,954,160	2,958,385	−0.14%	46,923 sq mi (121,531 km^{2})	63.0/sq mi (24.3/km^{2})
North Carolina	11,197,968	10,450,215	+7.16%	48,618 sq mi (125,920 km^{2})	230.3/sq mi (88.9/km^{2})
South Carolina	5,570,274	5,131,992	+8.54%	30,061 sq mi (77,857 km^{2})	185.3/sq mi (71.5/km^{2})
Tennessee	7,315,076	6,927,736	+5.59%	41,235 sq mi (106,798 km^{2})	177.4/sq mi (68.5/km^{2})
Virginia	8,880,107	8,637,303	+2.81%	39,490 sq mi (102,279 km^{2})	224.9/sq mi (86.8/km^{2})
West Virginia	1,766,147	1,791,670	−1.42%	24,038 sq mi (62,259 km^{2})	73.5/sq mi (28.4/km^{2})
Total	96,247,277	89,607,385	+7.41%	526,874 sq mi (1,364,597 km^{2})	161.9/sq mi (62.5/km^{2})

=== U.S. territories ===
Puerto Rico and the U.S. Virgin Islands are located southeast of Florida, and are considered to be in the South / Southeastern U.S. by the FAA, Agricultural Research Service, and the U.S. National Park Service.

Territory	2020 census	2010 census	Change	Land area	Density
Puerto Rico	3,285,874	3,725,789	−11.81%	3,459 sq mi (8,959 km^{2})	923.3/sq mi (356.5/km^{2})
U.S. Virgin Islands	87,146	106,405	−18.10%	134 sq mi (346 km^{2})	795.2/sq mi (307.0/km^{2})

=== Largest cities ===
These are the largest cities in the Southeastern region of the United States by population, according to the United States Census Bureau in 2025:

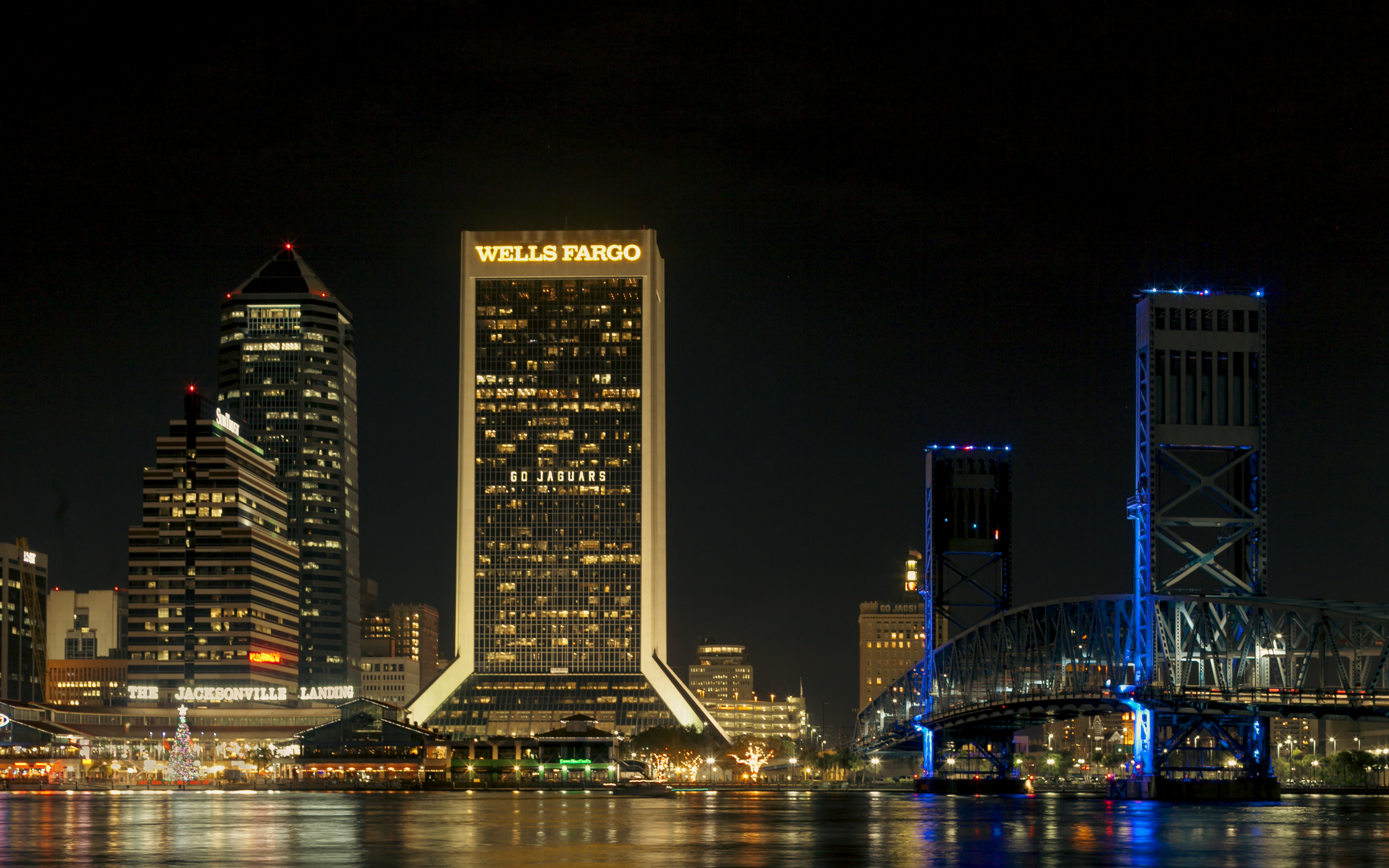
Jacksonville, Florida. The regions largest city.

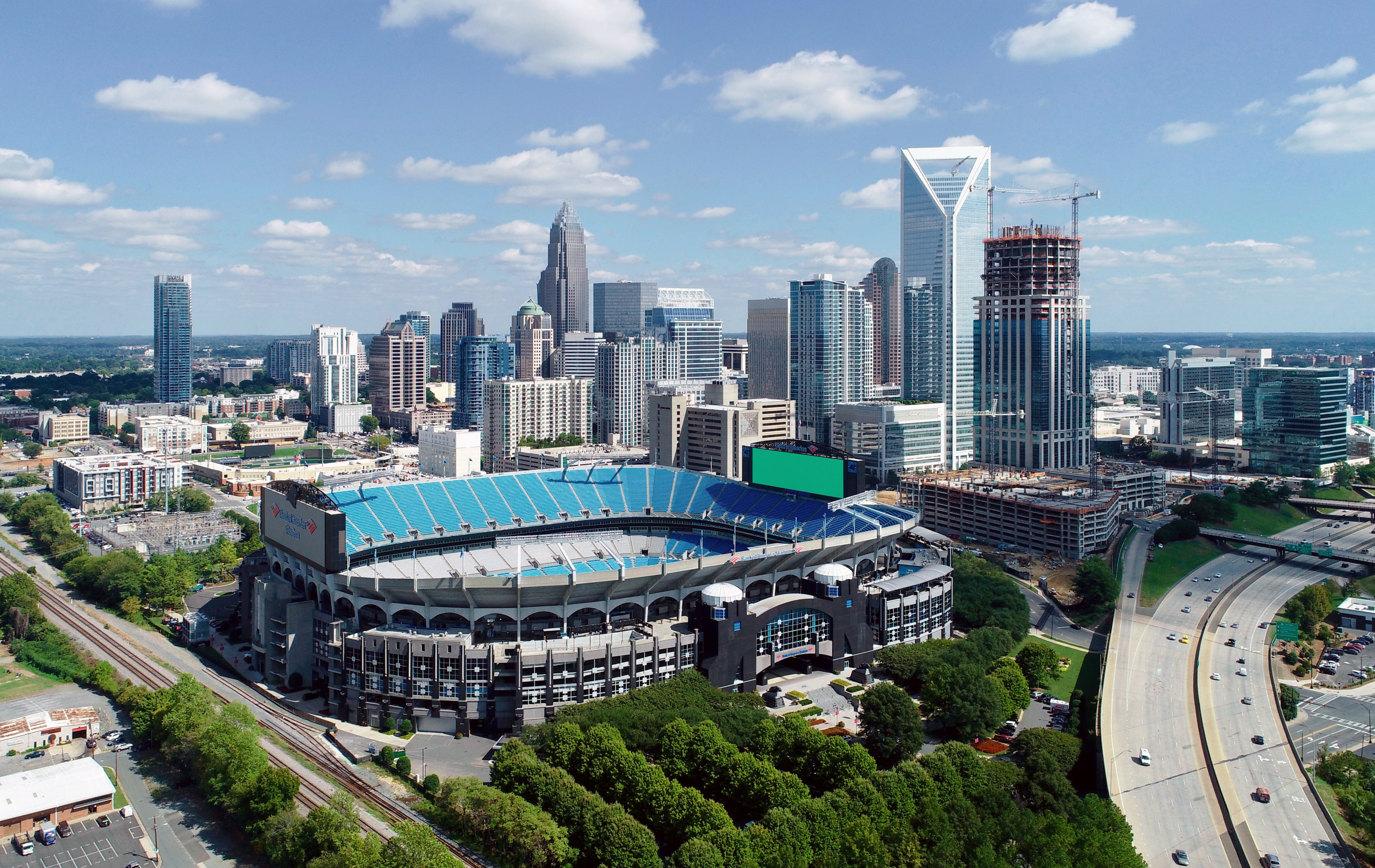
Charlotte, North Carolina. The regions second largest city.

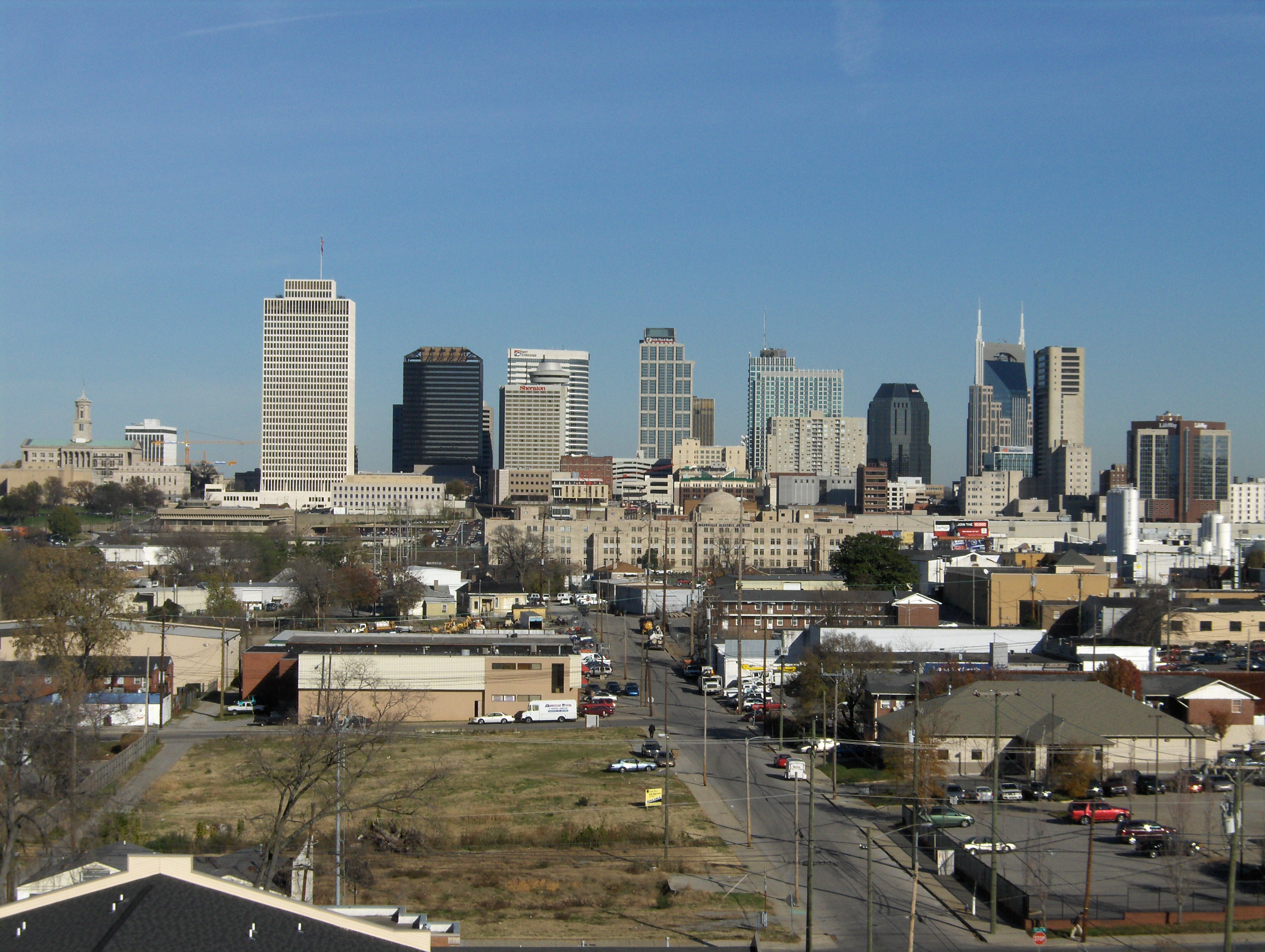
Nashville, Tennessee. The regions third largest city.

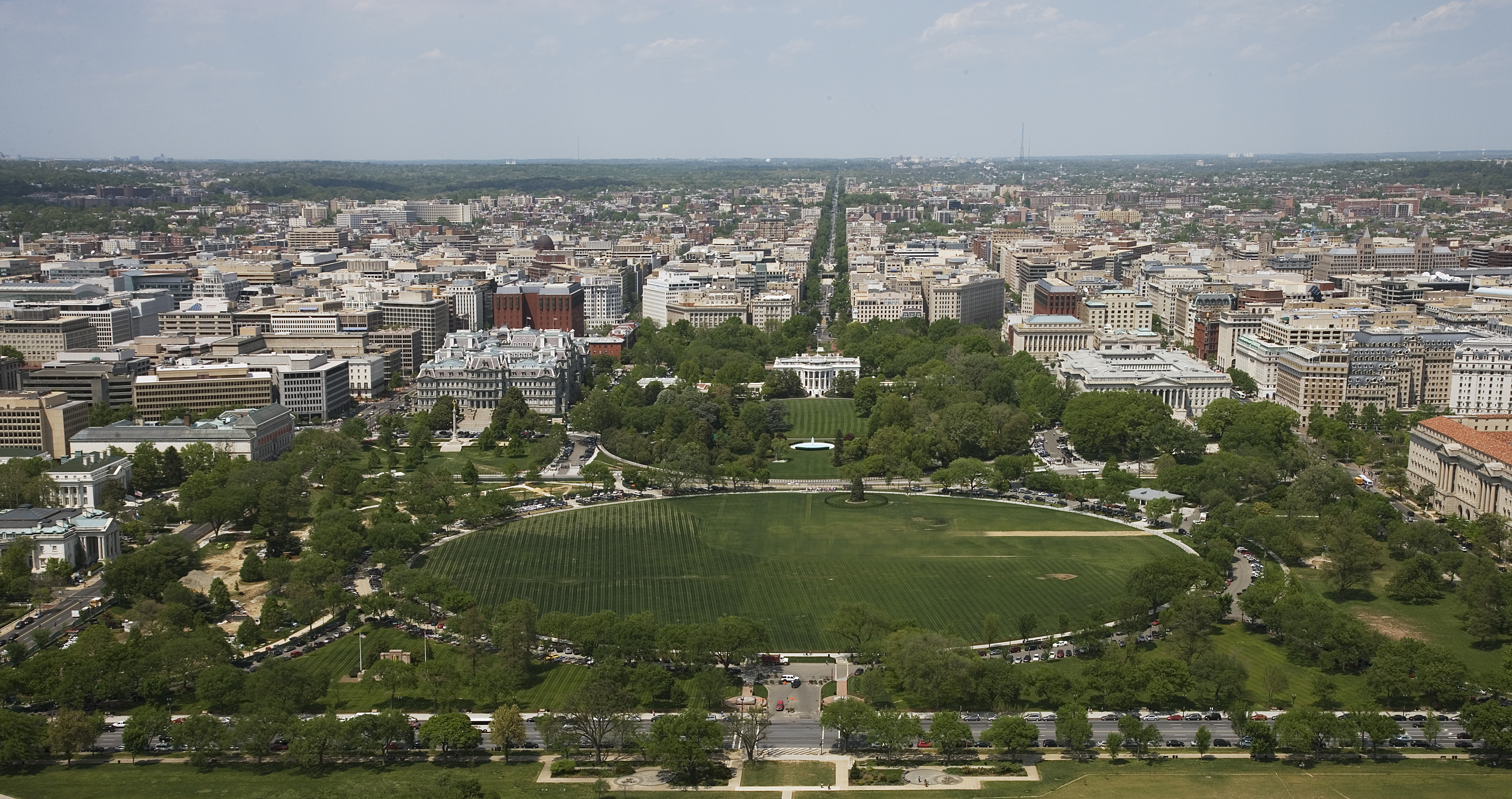
Washington, DC. The regions fourth largest city, and the nation's capital.

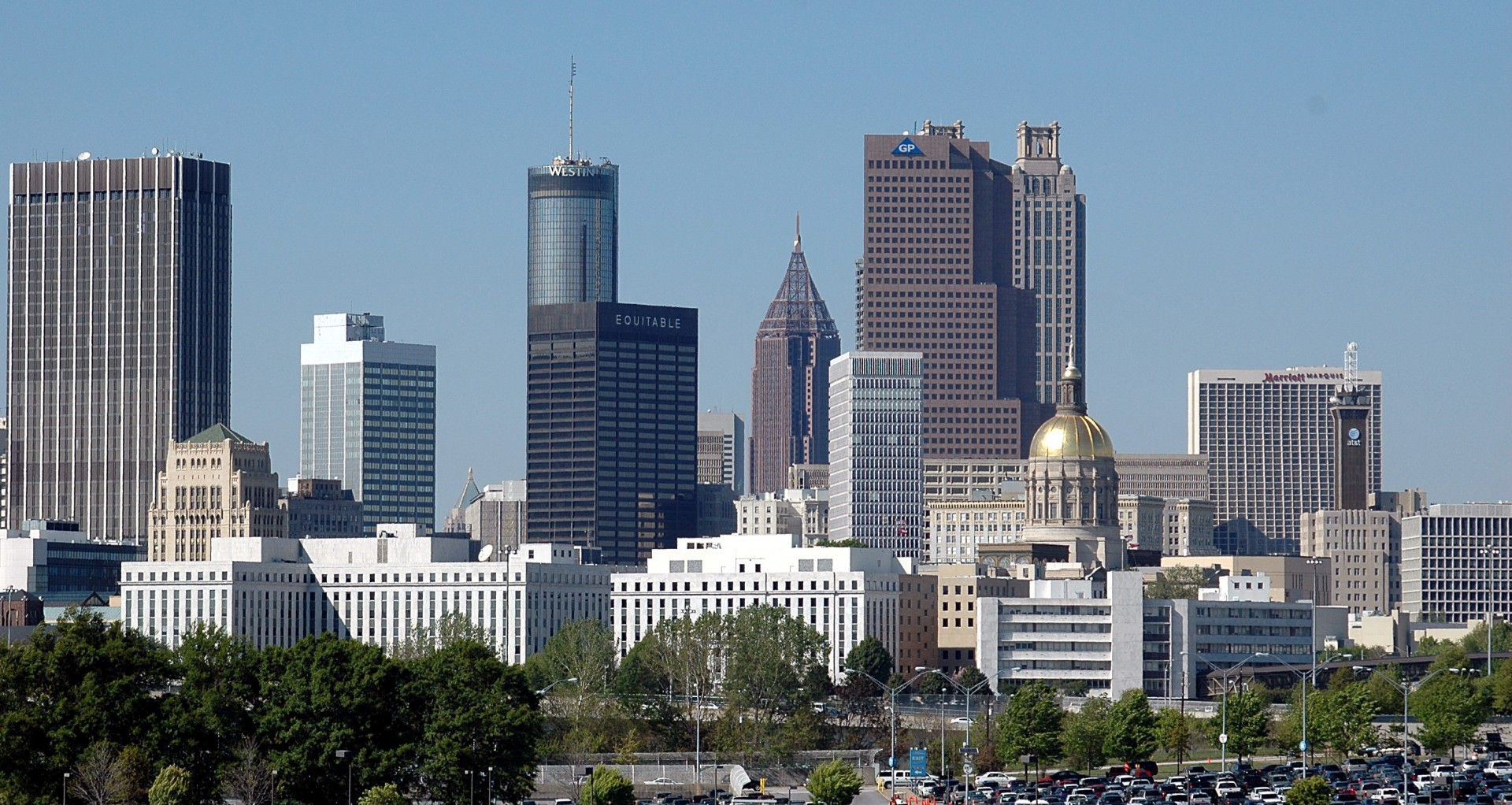
Atlanta, Georgia. The regions eighth largest city. Home to the busiest airport in the world.

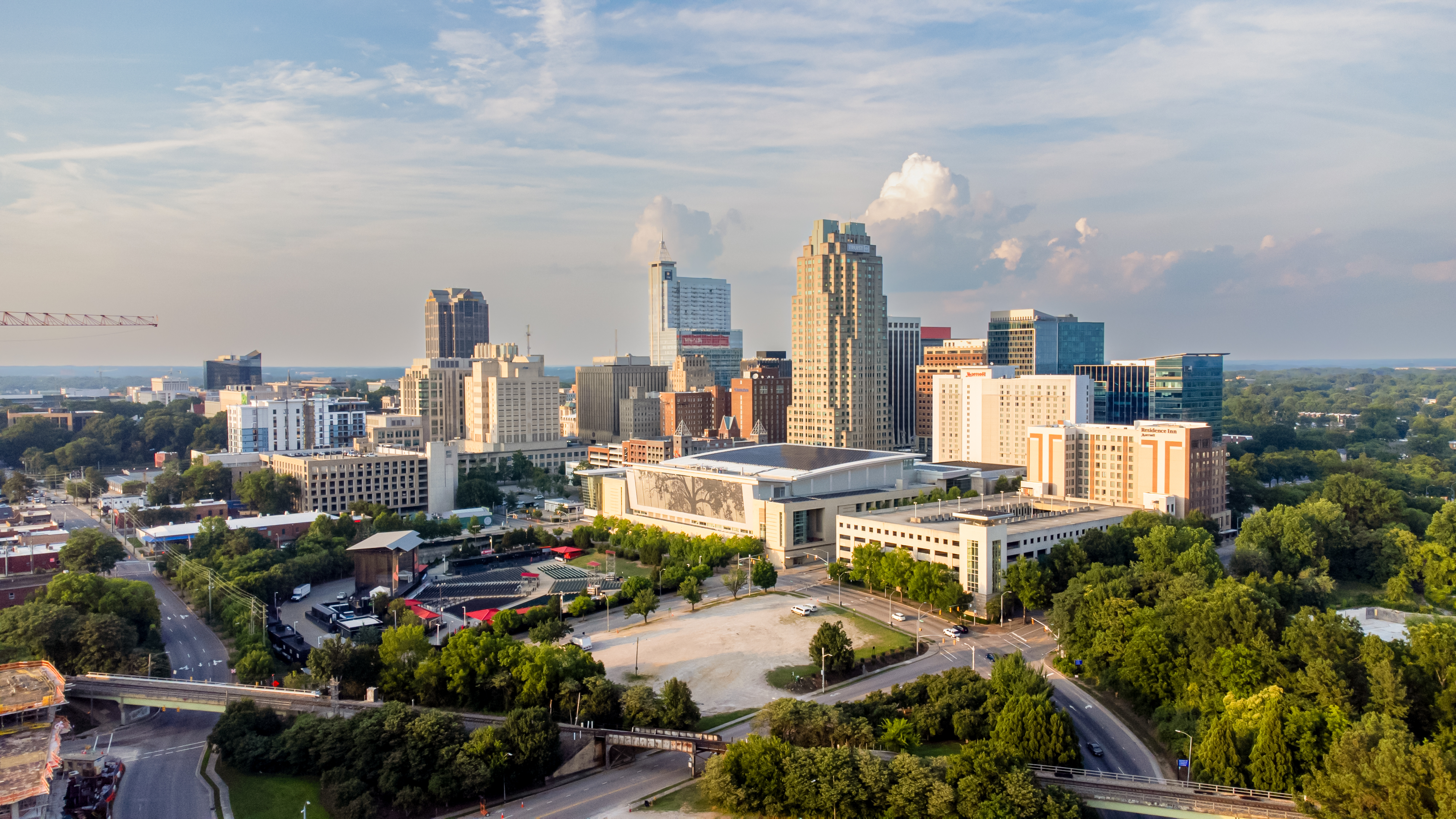
Raleigh, North Carolina. The regions ninth largest city.

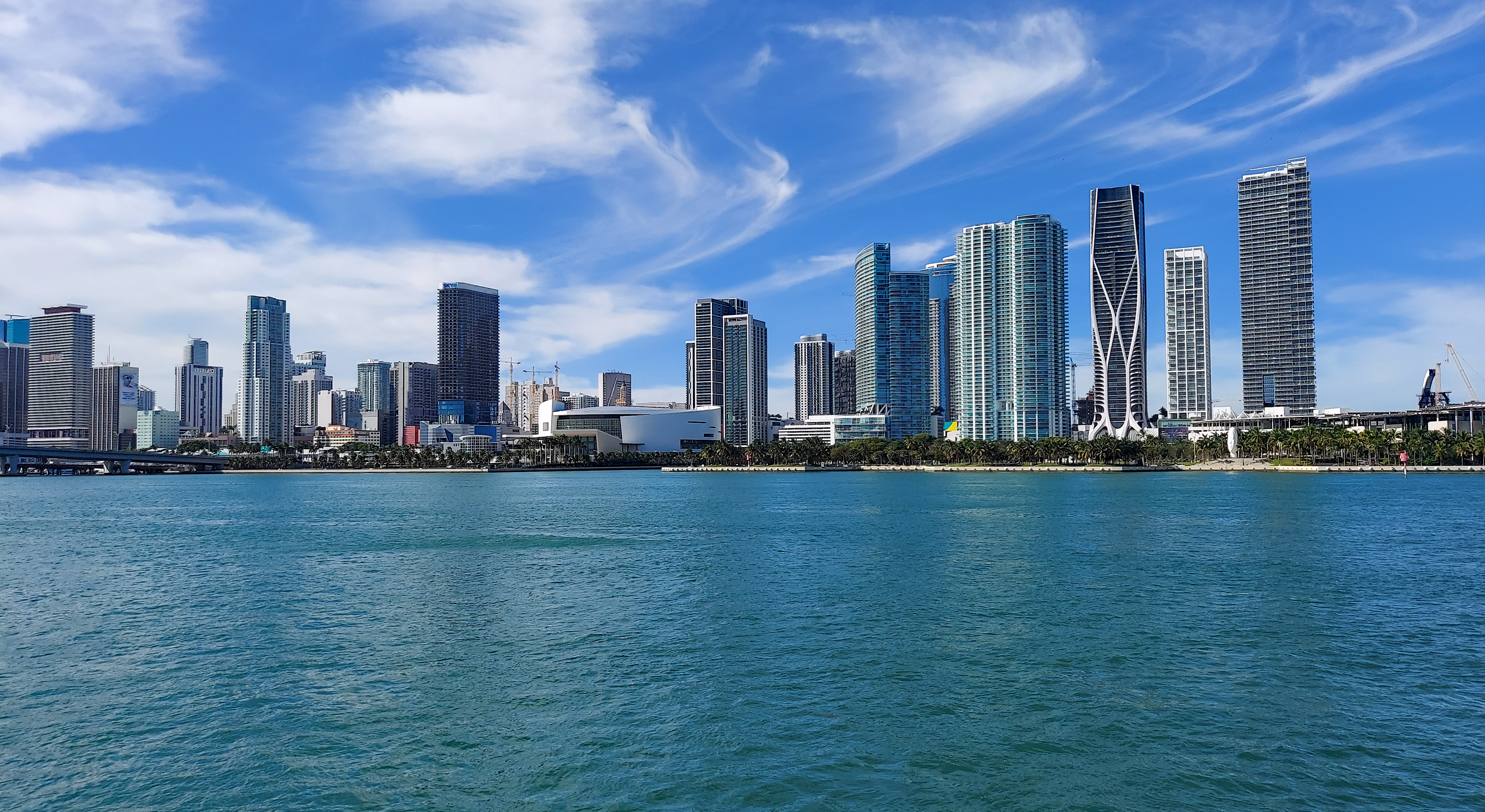
Miami, Florida. The regions tenth largest city.

Rank (2025)	City	State or territory	Population (2025)	Population (2020)
1	Jacksonville (Note: Jacksonville, Louisville, Nashville, Augusta and New Orleans are consolidated city-counties/parishes. Therefore the population given is for the entire city excluding other incorporated places lying within the county limits.)	Florida	1,017,689	949,607
2	Charlotte	North Carolina	964,784	874,708
3	Nashville	Tennessee	721,074	689,449
4	Washington	District of Columbia	693,645	689,544
5	Louisville	Kentucky	641,962	631,901
6	Memphis	Tennessee	609,647	628,510
7	Baltimore	Maryland	569,997	585,729
8	Atlanta	Georgia	529,110	498,805
9	Raleigh	North Carolina	506,306	468,102
10	Miami	Florida	489,812	442,236
11	Virginia Beach	Virginia	453,737	459,417
12	Tampa	Florida	413,554	385,336
13	New Orleans	Louisiana	362,154	384,129
14	Orlando	Florida	333,888	308,101
15	Lexington	Kentucky	329,751	322,563
16	San Juan	Puerto Rico	329,737	342,263
17	Greensboro	North Carolina	308,667	299,197
18	Durham	North Carolina	305,561	283,881
19	Port St. Lucie	Florida	268,062	204,826
20	St. Petersburg	Florida	264,033	258,358
21	Winston-Salem	North Carolina	257,271	249,549
22	Chesapeake	Virginia	255,332	249,251
23	Richmond	Virginia	237,257	226,522
24	Cape Coral	Florida	236,264	194,004
25	Huntsville	Alabama	233,627	214,989
26	Norfolk	Virginia	231,013	238,090
27	Hialeah	Florida	230,968	223,143
28	Baton Rouge	Louisiana	222,795	226,697
29	Fayetteville	North Carolina	209,120	208,427
30	Little Rock	Arkansas	206,427	202,543

These are the metropolitan areas of the Southeastern region which exceed one million in population according to the United States Census Bureau's 2025 estimates as estimated by the United States Census Bureau

Rank	Metropolitan area	Anchor city	Population (2025 estimate)	State(s) or territory
1	Atlanta–Sandy Springs-Roswell	Atlanta	6,482,182	Georgia
2	Washington-Arlington-Alexandria	Washington	6,465,724	District of Columbia / Virginia / Maryland / West Virginia
3	Miami-Fort Lauderdale-West Palm Beach	Miami	6,391,072	Florida
4	Tampa-St. Petersburg-Clearwater	Tampa	3,418,895	Florida
5	Orlando-Kissimmee-Sanford	Orlando	2,957,672	Florida
6	Charlotte-Concord-Gastonia	Charlotte	2,938,830	North Carolina / South Carolina
7	Baltimore-Columbia-Towson	Baltimore	2,857,781	Maryland
8	Nashville-Davidson–Murfreesboro–Franklin	Nashville	2,197,416	Tennessee
9	Virginia Beach–Chesapeake–Norfolk	Virginia Beach	1,797,213	Virginia / North Carolina
10	Jacksonville	Jacksonville	1,785,500	Florida
11	Raleigh–Cary	Raleigh	1,595,720	North Carolina
12	Louisville–Jefferson County	Louisville	1,402,509	Kentucky / Indiana
13	Richmond-Petersburg	Richmond	1,389,338	Virginia
14	Memphis	Memphis	1,341,412	Tennessee / Mississippi / Arkansas
15	Birmingham-Hoover	Birmingham	1,197,766	Alabama

=== Combined statistical areas ===
Beyond Megalopolis by Virginia Tech's Metropolitan Institute, an attempt to update Jean Gottmann's work with current trends, defines two "megapolitan areas" contained within the Southeast, out of a total of ten such areas in the United States:

- "Piedmont" extending from North Carolina to Alabama
- "Peninsula" covering South Florida and Central Florida

Two others tie some areas on the margins of the Southeast to urban centers in other regions:

- "Gulf Coast" extending as far east as the western tip of Florida
- "Northeast" including much of Maryland, Central Virginia, and Eastern Virginia.

These are the combined statistical areas of the Southeastern region which exceed 1 million in population according to the United States Census Bureau's 2016 estimates. Note that the metropolitan areas of Tampa and Richmond are not included in any CSAs, so they are included in the table without constituent areas.

Rank	Combined Statistical Area	Population (2025)	Constituent Core Based Statistical Areas
1	Washington-Baltimore-Arlington, DC-MD-VA-WV-PA Combined Statistical Area	10,274,894	Washington-Arlington-Alexandria, DC-VA-MD-WV Metropolitan Statistical Area; Baltimore-Columbia-Towson, MD Metropolitan Statistical Area; Hagerstown-Martinsburg, MD-WV Metropolitan Statistical Area; Chambersburg-Waynesboro, PA Metropolitan Statistical Area; Winchester, VA-WV Metropolitan Statistical Area; California-Lexington Park, MD Metropolitan Statistical Area; Easton, MD Micropolitan Statistical Area; Cambridge, MD Micropolitan Statistical Area
2	Atlanta–Athens-Clarke County–Sandy Springs, GA Combined Statistical Area	7,426,769	Atlanta-Sandy Springs-Roswell, GA Metropolitan Statistical Area; Athens-Clarke County, GA Metropolitan Statistical Area; Gainesville, GA Metropolitan Statistical Area; LaGrange, GA Micropolitan Statistical Area; Jefferson, GA Micropolitan Statistical Area; Calhoun, GA Micropolitan Statistical Area; Cedartown, GA Micropolitan Statistical Area; Thomaston, GA Micropolitan Statistical Area
3	Miami-Fort Lauderdale-Port St. Lucie, FL Combined Statistical Area	7,255,606	Miami-Fort Lauderdale-West Palm Beach, FL Metropolitan Statistical Area; Port St. Lucie, FL Metropolitan Statistical Area; Sebastian-Vero Beach, FL Metropolitan Statistical Area; Okeechobee, FL Micropolitan Statistical Area
4	Orlando-Deltona-Daytona Beach, FL Combined Statistical Area	4,737,167	Orlando-Kissimmee-Sanford, FL Metropolitan Statistical Area; Deltona-Daytona Beach-Ormond Beach, FL Metropolitan Statistical Area; The Villages, FL Metropolitan Statistical Area
5	Charlotte-Concord, NC-SC Combined Statistical Area	3,533,073	Charlotte-Concord-Gastonia, NC-SC Metropolitan Statistical Area; Shelby, NC Micropolitan Statistical Area; Albemarle, NC Micropolitan Statistical Area
6	Raleigh-Durham-Chapel Hill, NC Combined Statistical Area	2,484,238	Raleigh, NC Metropolitan Statistical Area; Durham-Chapel Hill, NC Metropolitan Statistical Area; Dunn, NC Micropolitan Statistical Area; Oxford, NC Micropolitan Statistical Area; Sanford, NC Micropolitan Statistical Area; Henderson, NC Micropolitan Statistical Area
7	Nashville-Davidson–Murfreesboro, TN Combined Statistical Area	2,452,592	Nashville-Davidson–Murfreesboro–Franklin, TN Metropolitan Statistical Area; Shelbyville, TN Micropolitan Statistical Area; Lawrenceburg, TN Micropolitan Statistical Area; Lewisburg, TN Micropolitan Statistical Area
8	Jacksonville-St. Marys-Palatka, FL-GA Combined Statistical Area	1,923,377	Jacksonville, FL Metropolitan Statistical Area; Palatka, FL Micropolitan Statistical Area; St. Marys, GA Micropolitan Statistical Area
9	Virginia Beach-Norfolk, VA-NC Combined Statistical Area	1,877,659	Virginia Beach-Norfolk-Newport News, VA-NC Metropolitan Statistical Area; Elizabeth City, NC Micropolitan Statistical Area; Kill Devil Hills, NC Micropolitan Statistical Area
10	Greensboro–Winston-Salem–High Point, NC Combined Statistical Area	1,776,615	Greensboro-High Point, NC Metropolitan Statistical Area; Winston-Salem, NC Metropolitan Statistical Area; Burlington, NC Metropolitan Statistical Area; Mount Airy, NC Micropolitan Statistical Area
11	Greenville-Spartanburg-Anderson, SC Combined Statistical Area	1,659,022	Greenville-Anderson-Mauldin, SC Metropolitan Statistical Area; Spartanburg, SC Metropolitan Statistical Area; Greenwood, SC Micropolitan Statistical Area; Seneca, SC Micropolitan Statistical Area; Gaffney, SC Micropolitan Statistical Area
12	Louisville/Jefferson County–Elizabethtown–Bardstown, KY-IN Combined Statistical Area	1,531,175	Louisville/Jefferson County, KY-IN Metropolitan Statistical Area; Elizabethtown-Fort Knox, KY Metropolitan Statistical Area; Bardstown, KY Micropolitan Statistical Area; Scottsburg, IN Micropolitan Statistical Area
13	Birmingham-Hoover-Talladega, AL Combined Statistical Area	1,383,539	Birmingham-Hoover, AL Metropolitan Statistical Area; Talladega-Sylacauga, AL Micropolitan Statistical Area; Cullman, AL Micropolitan Statistical Area
14	Memphis-Forrest City, TN-MS-AR Combined Statistical Area	1,383,061	Memphis, TN-MS-AR Metropolitan Statistical Area; Forrest City, AR Micropolitan Statistical Area
15	Cape Coral-Fort Myers-Naples, FL Combined Statistical Area	1,354,284	Cape Coral-Fort Myers, FL Metropolitan Statistical Area; Naples-Immokalee-Marco Island, FL Metropolitan Statistical Area
16	New Orleans-Metairie-Hammond, LA-MS Combined Statistical Area	1,354,257	New Orleans-Metairie, LA Metropolitan Statistical Area; Hammond, LA Metropolitan Statistical Area; Picayune, MS Micropolitan Statistical Area; Bogalusa, LA Micropolitan Statistical Area
17	Knoxville-Morristown-Sevierville, TN Combined Statistical Area	1,236,235	Knoxville, TN Metropolitan Statistical Area; Morristown, TN Metropolitan Statistical Area; Sevierville, TN Micropolitan Statistical Area; Newport, TN Micropolitan Statistical Area
18	North Port-Sarasota, FL Combined Statistical Area	1,202,448	North Port-Sarasota-Bradenton, FL Metropolitan Statistical Area; Punta Gorda, FL Metropolitan Statistical Area; Arcadia, FL Micropolitan Statistical Area
19	Columbia–Sumter–Orangeburg, SC Combined Statistical Area	1,107,723	Columbia, SC MSA Sumter, SC MSA Orangeburg, SC μSA Newberry, SC μSA
20	Baton Rouge–Hammond, LA Combined Statistical Area	1,030,045	Baton Rouge, LA MSA Hammond, LA MSA

== Culture ==
The predominant culture of the Southeast U.S. has its origins with the settlement of the region by European colonists and African slaves during the 17th to 19th centuries, as large groups of English, Scottish, Scotch-Irish, Germans, Spanish, French, and Acadians migrated to the region. Since the late 20th century, the "New South" has emerged as the fastest-growing area of the United States economically. Multiculturalism has become more mainstream in the Southeastern states. African Americans remain a dominant demographic, at around 30% of the total population of the Southeast. Cities along this corridor from north to south include the Raleigh-Durham area, Greensboro, Charlotte, Spartanburg, Greenville, Atlanta, and Montgomery.

== Climate ==
Most of the southeastern part of the United States is dominated by the humid subtropical climate (Cfa/Cwa). As one nears the southern portion of Florida, the climate gradually becomes tropical, as the winter season and all months have a mean temperature above 64.4 °F (18.0 °C) (the defined coldest monthly mean temperature of tropical climates).

Seasonally, summers are generally hot and humid throughout the entire region. The Bermuda High pumps hot and moist air mass from the tropical Atlantic Ocean and eastern Gulf of Mexico westward toward the southeast United States, creating the typical sultry tropical summers. Daytime highs are often in the upper 80s to lower 90s F. Rainfall is summer concentrated along the Gulf Coast and the South Atlantic coast from Norfolk, Virginia southward, reaching a sharp summer monsoon-like pattern over peninsular Florida, with dry winters and wet summers. Sunshine is abundant across the southeastern United States in summer, as the rainfall often comes in quick, but intense downpours. The mid-South, especially Tennessee, and the northern halves of Mississippi, Alabama, and Georgia, have maximum monthly rainfall amounts in winter and spring, owing to copious Gulf moisture and clashes between warm, moist air from the Gulf of Mexico and cold, dry air from Canada during the cold season. In this area, December, March, or April are typically the wettest months; August to October, the driest months (for example, in Tupelo, MS, Huntsville, AL and Memphis, TN). The region is also part of Dixie Alley and are prone to Tornadoes particularly in states such as Alabama, Kentucky, Louisiana, Mississippi and Tennessee.

Winters are cool in the northern areas like Tennessee, Virginia, Maryland, and western North Carolina, with average high temperatures in the 45 °F (7 °C) range in January. Farther south, winters become milder across interior eastern North and South Carolina, Georgia, and Alabama, with average January highs in the 53 °F (12 °C) range. As one nears the Gulf of Mexico, coastal plain, and coastal areas of Georgia and the Carolinas, winters become warm, with daytime highs near or over 60 °F (16 °C). Once in Florida, daytime highs are above 70 °F (21 °C) from just south of St. Augustine on the Atlantic coast and Clearwater on the Gulf Of Mexico. Extreme southern Florida has the warmest winter temperatures (mid 70's F) in the United States. Winters tend to be very dry and sunny across Florida, with a gradual increase in winter rainfall with increasing latitude, especially west of the Appalachian Mountains.

== Economy ==
The Southeast economically has changed dramatically since the late 20th century. There has been a boom in its service economy, manufacturing base, high technology industries, and the financial sector. Examples of this include the surge in tourism in Florida and along the Gulf Coast; the numerous new automobile production plants such as Mercedes-Benz in Tuscaloosa; Hyundai in Montgomery; Toyota Motors in Blue Springs, Mississippi; Kia in West Point, Georgia; BMW production plant in Greer, South Carolina; Volkswagen in Chattanooga; GM manufacturing plant in Spring Hill, Tennessee; with the Nissan North American headquarters in Franklin, Tennessee; Mercedes-Benz USA; and Porsche North American headquarters in the Atlanta area; the two largest research parks in the country: Research Triangle Park in the Triangle area of North Carolina (the world's largest) and the Cummings Research Park in Huntsville, Alabama (the world's fourth largest); corporate headquarters of Bank of America, Truist Financial, and Wells Fargo in Charlotte, North Carolina, the corporate headquarters of International Paper, AutoZone, and FedEx in Memphis, Tennessee as well as the corporate headquarters of the Coca-Cola Company, Delta Air Lines, the Home Depot and United Parcel Service in Atlanta, Georgia. Dillards, along with Heifer International, is headquartered in Little Rock, Arkansas. Walmart is also headquartered in Arkansas.

In 2020, Fortune 500 companies having headquarters in the Southeast region include: 22 in Virginia, 18 in Georgia, 18 in Florida, 13 in North Carolina, and 10 in Tennessee. This economic expansion has enabled parts of the South to have some of the lowest unemployment rates in the United States. In Alabama, there is the large-scale manufacturing project owned by the German steel megacorporation ThyssenKrupp, which operates a massive, state-of-the-art facility in Mobile.

Even with certain states and areas in the Southeast doing well economically, many Southeast states and areas still have a high poverty rate when compared to the U.S. nationally. In 2017, seven Southeast states were in the top ten nationwide when it came to having the highest poverty rate.

=== Research and development areas ===
Research Triangle Park in the Raleigh–Durham urban area of North Carolina, has emerged as the largest in the nation, and a major hub of technology, governmental, and biotechnological research and development. The Cummings Research Park in the Huntsville, Alabama area, is the second-largest research complex in the nation. Located in Huntsville is the Redstone Arsenal, United States Army Missile Command, the U.S. Space & Rocket Center, NASA's Marshall Space Flight Center and other key government, military, and aerospace agencies. Tullahoma, TN contains the Arnold Air Force Base. The base is home to the Arnold Engineering Development Complex (AEDC), the most advanced and largest complex of flight simulation test facilities in the world.

The National High Magnetic Field Laboratory in Tallahassee, Florida, is the largest laboratory in the world devoted to the study of magnetism. The University of South Carolina is currently constructing a research campus in downtown Columbia, and the university is the nation's only National Science Foundation-funded Industry/University Cooperative Research Center for Fuel Cells.

== Education ==
=== Higher education ===
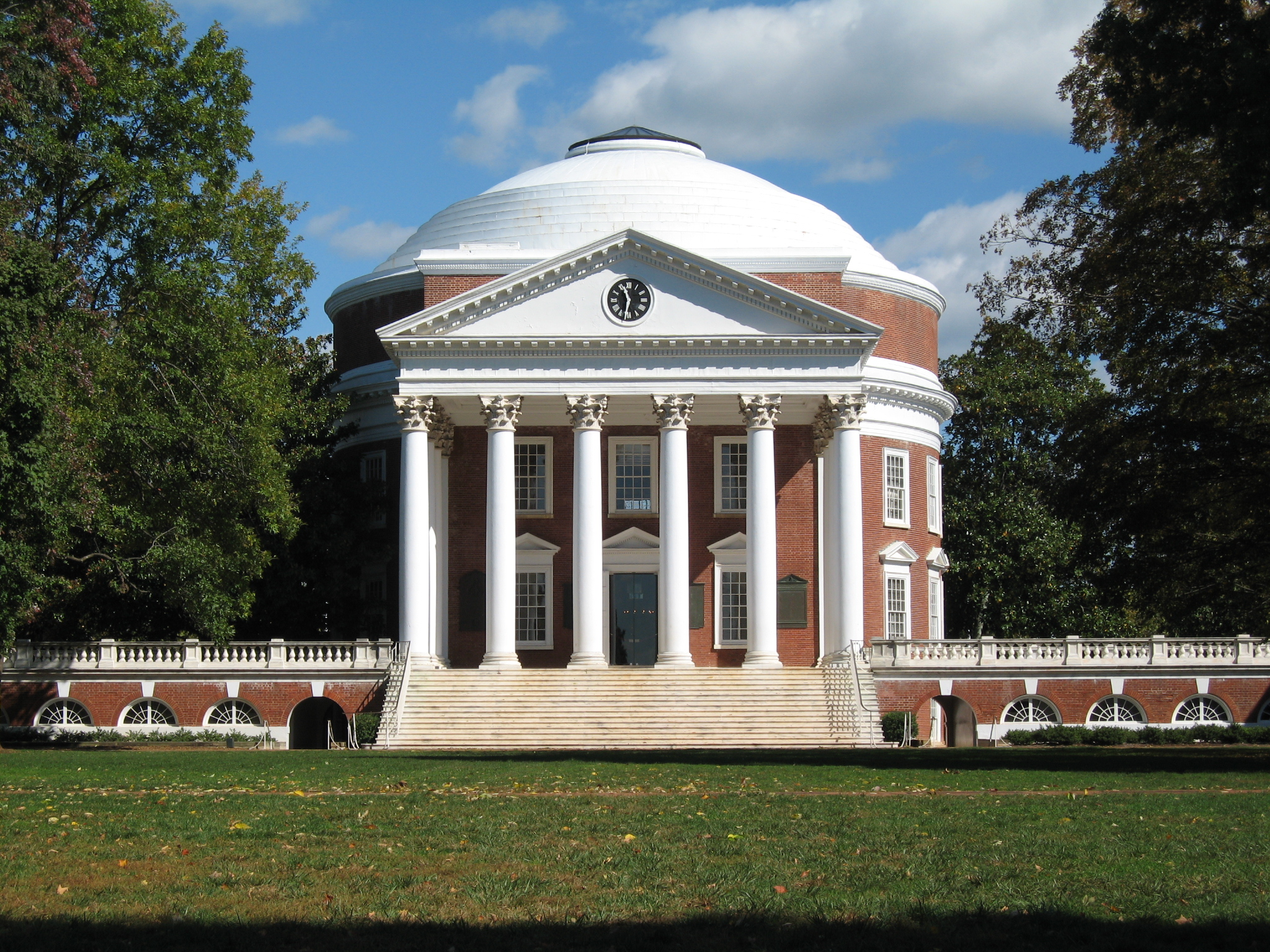
University of Virginia in Charlottesville, Virginia

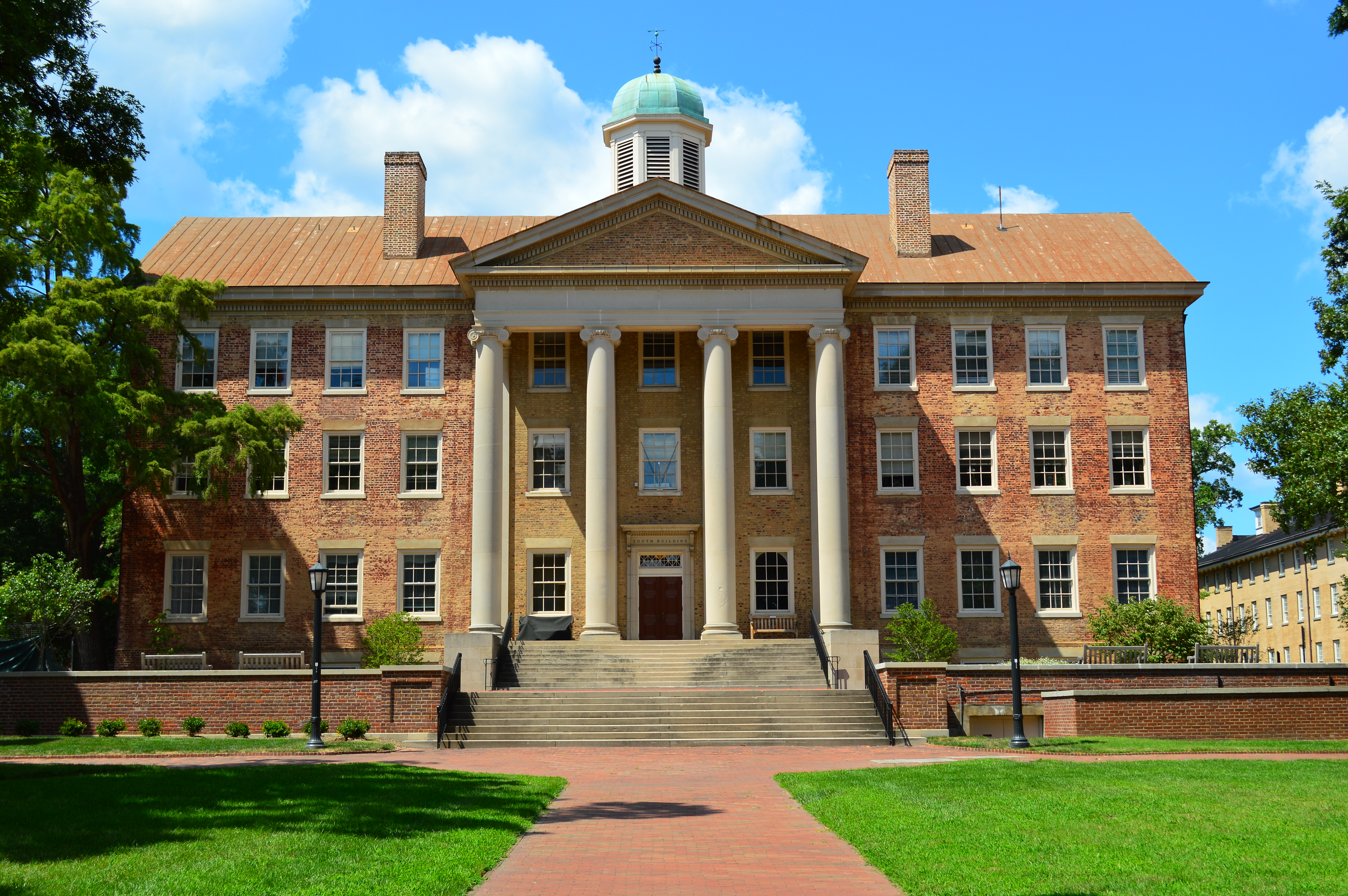
University of North Carolina in Chapel Hill, North Carolina

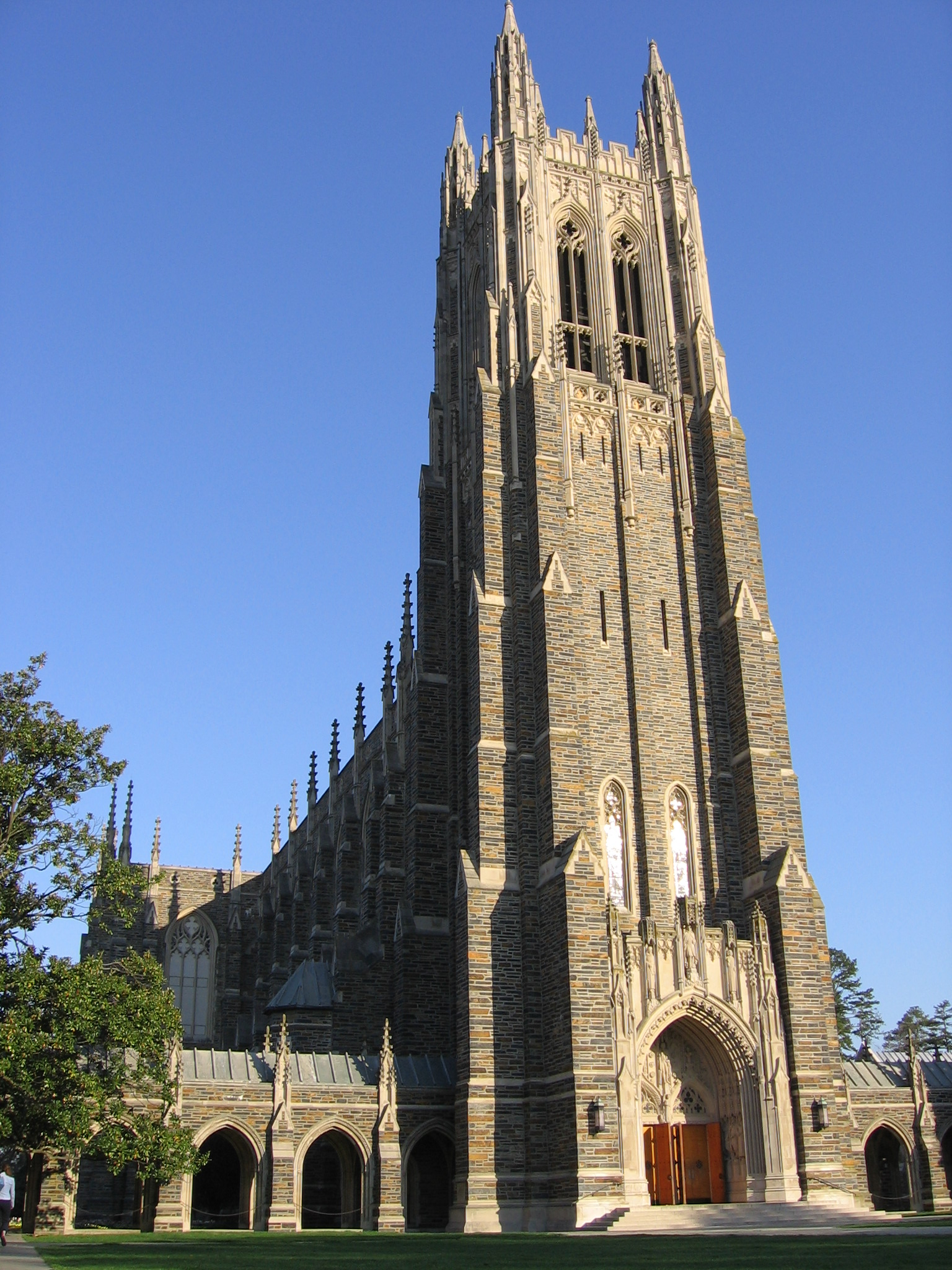
Duke University in Durham, North Carolina

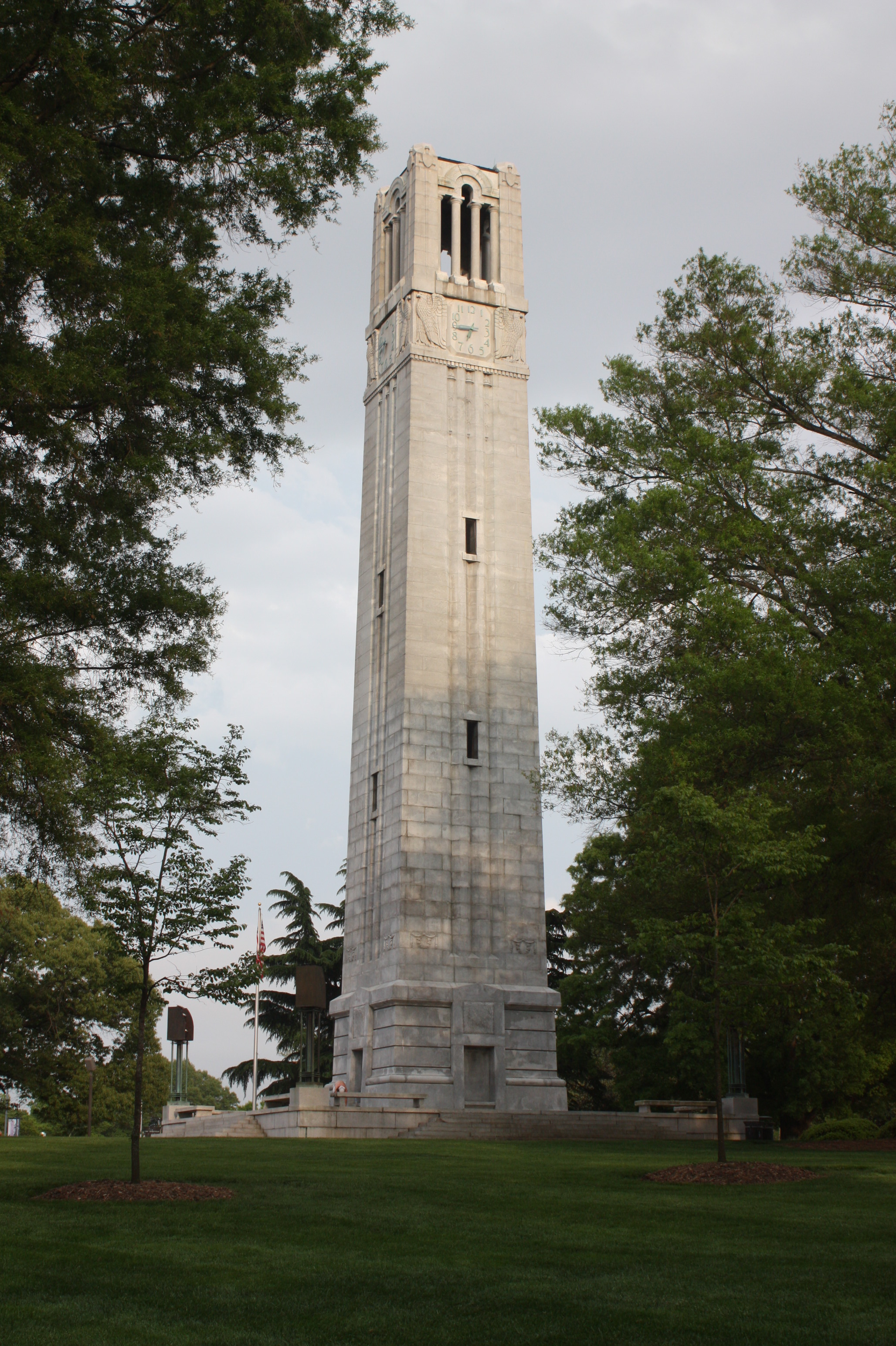
NC State University in Raleigh, North Carolina

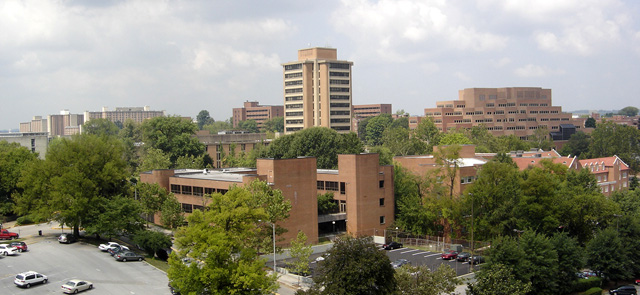
University of Tennessee in Knoxville, Tennessee

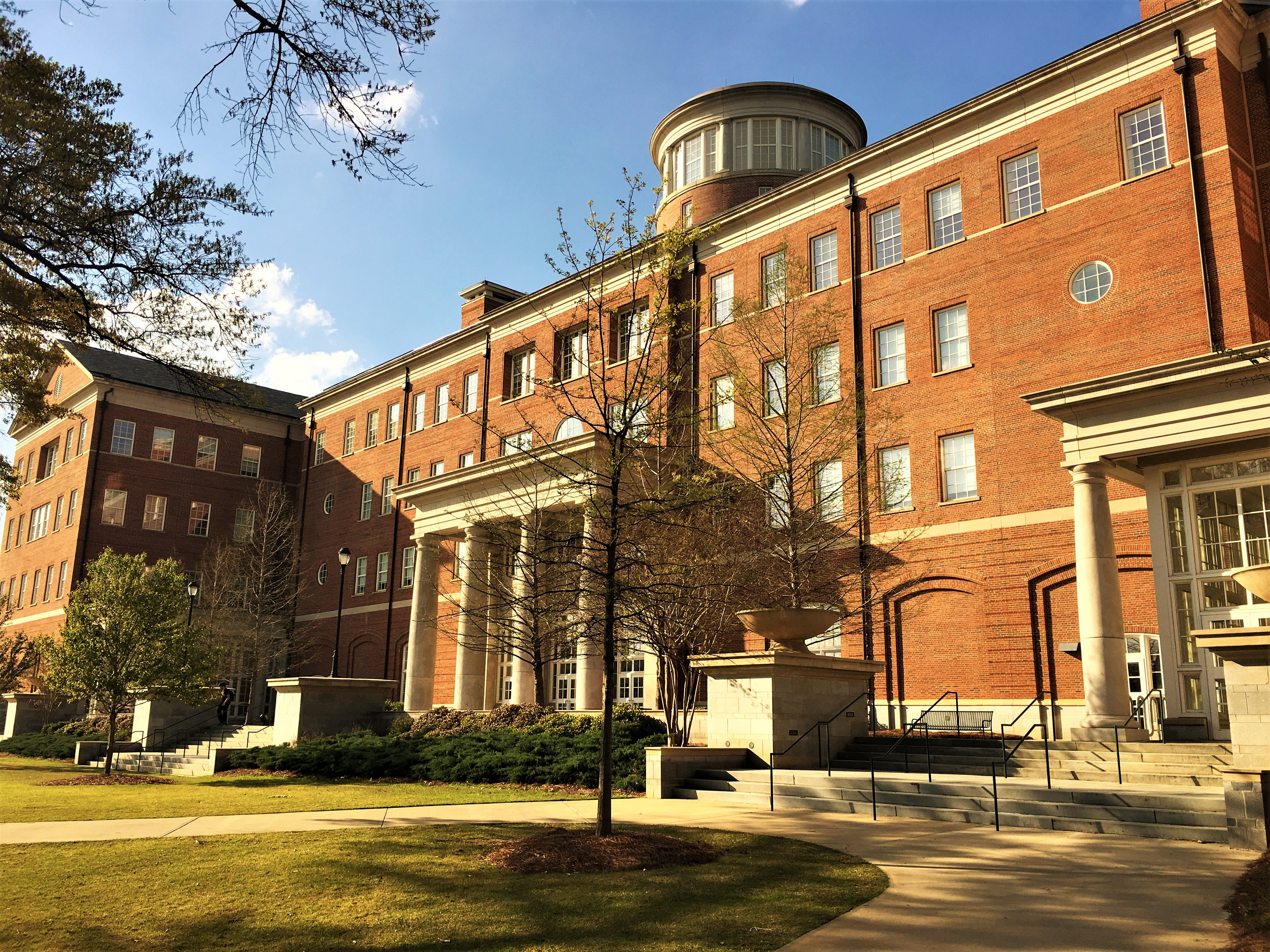
University of Georgia in Athens, Georgia

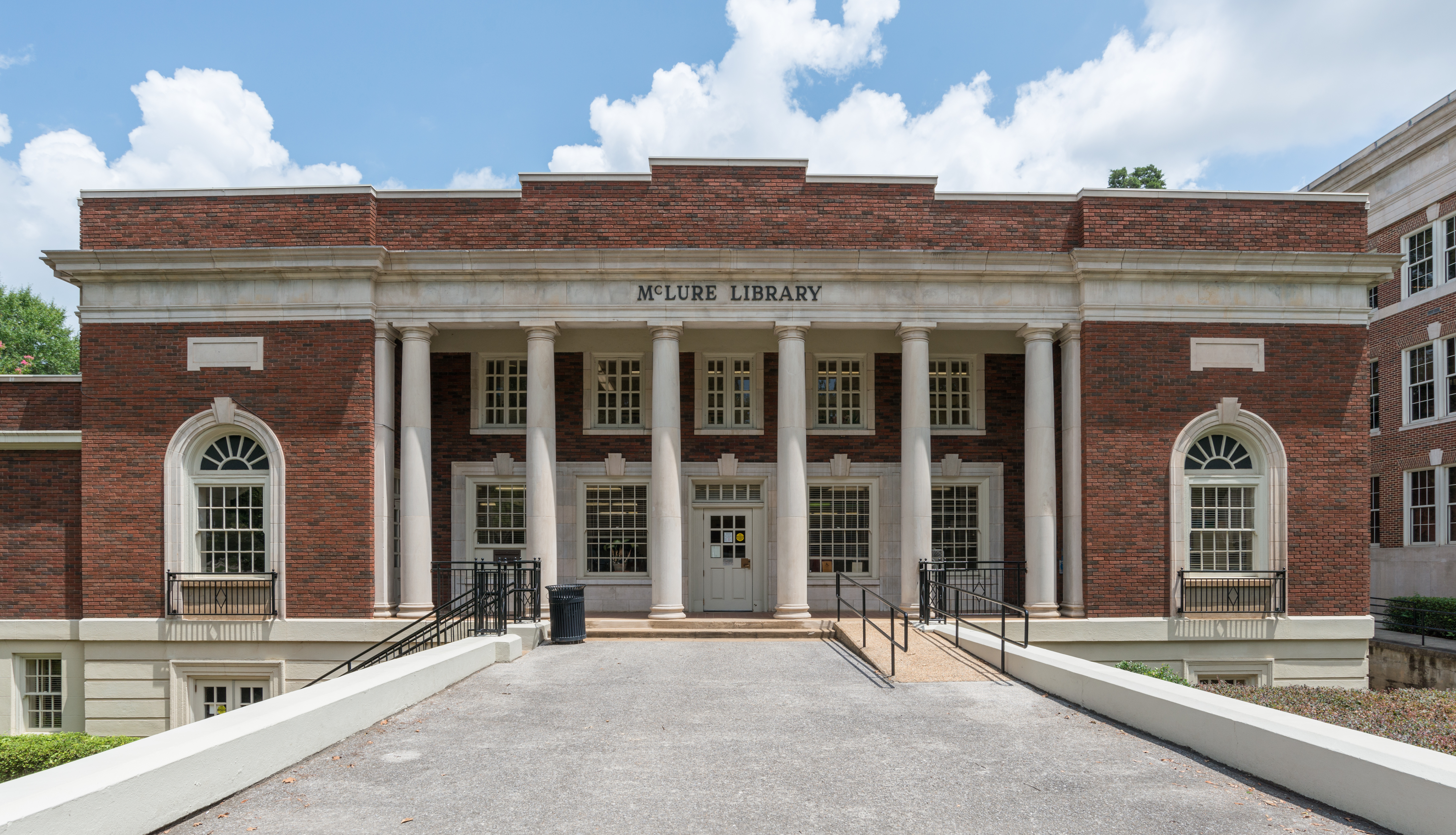
University of Alabama in Tuscaloosa, Alabama

The region includes a number of notable universities, public and private, whose research exert influence globally. Chief among public universities are:

- Auburn University
- Clemson University
- College of William & Mary
- Florida State University
- Georgia Tech
- George Mason University
- Louisiana State University
- Mississippi State University
- North Carolina State University
- University of Alabama
- University of Arkansas
- University of Florida
- University of Georgia
- University of Kentucky
- University of Louisville
- University of Maryland
- University of Memphis
- University of Mississippi
- University of North Carolina at Chapel Hill
- University of South Carolina
- University of South Florida
- University of Tennessee
- University of Virginia
- Virginia Tech
- West Virginia University

There are a number of well-known private institutions, as well. Notable among these are:

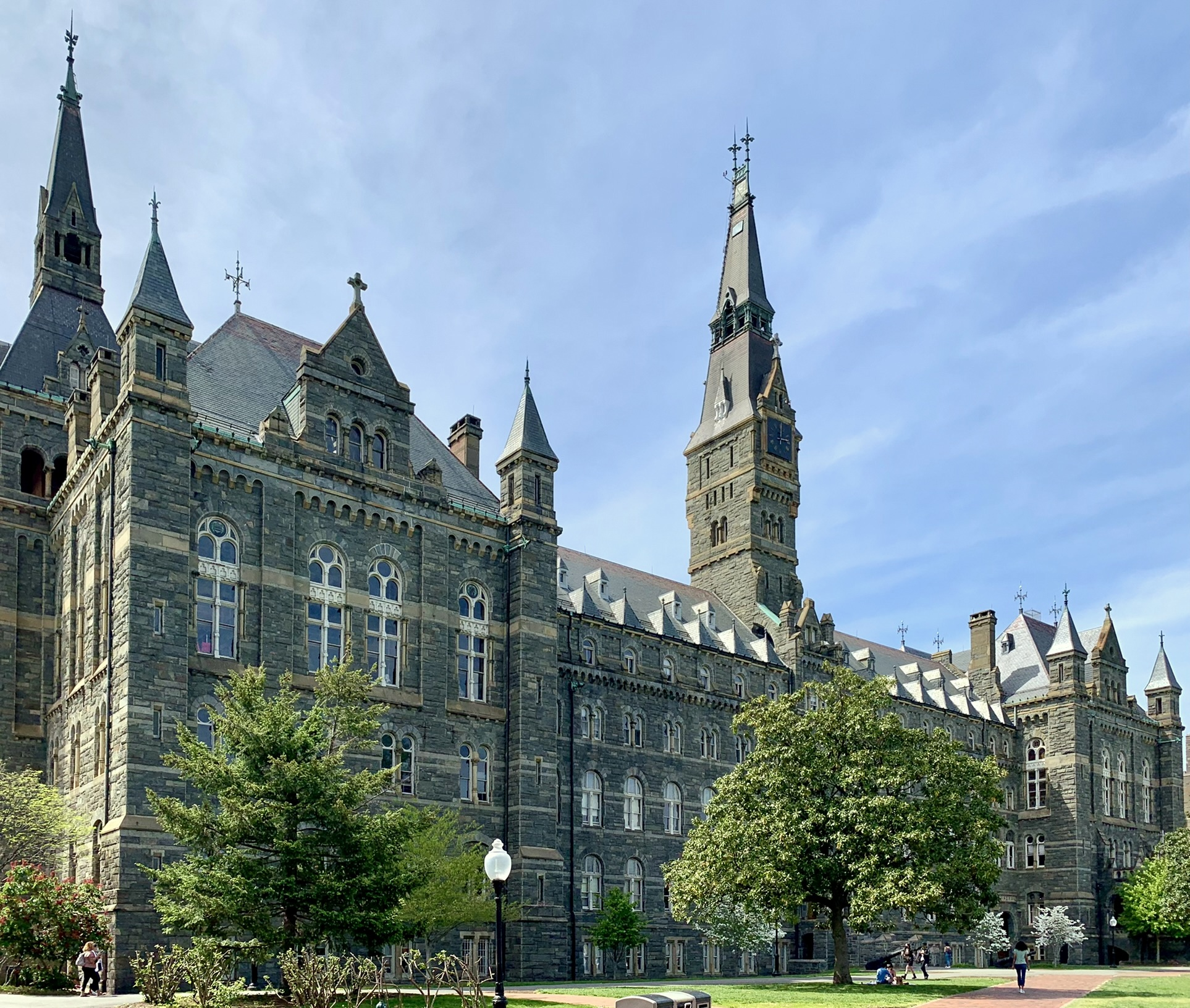
Georgetown University in Washington D.C.

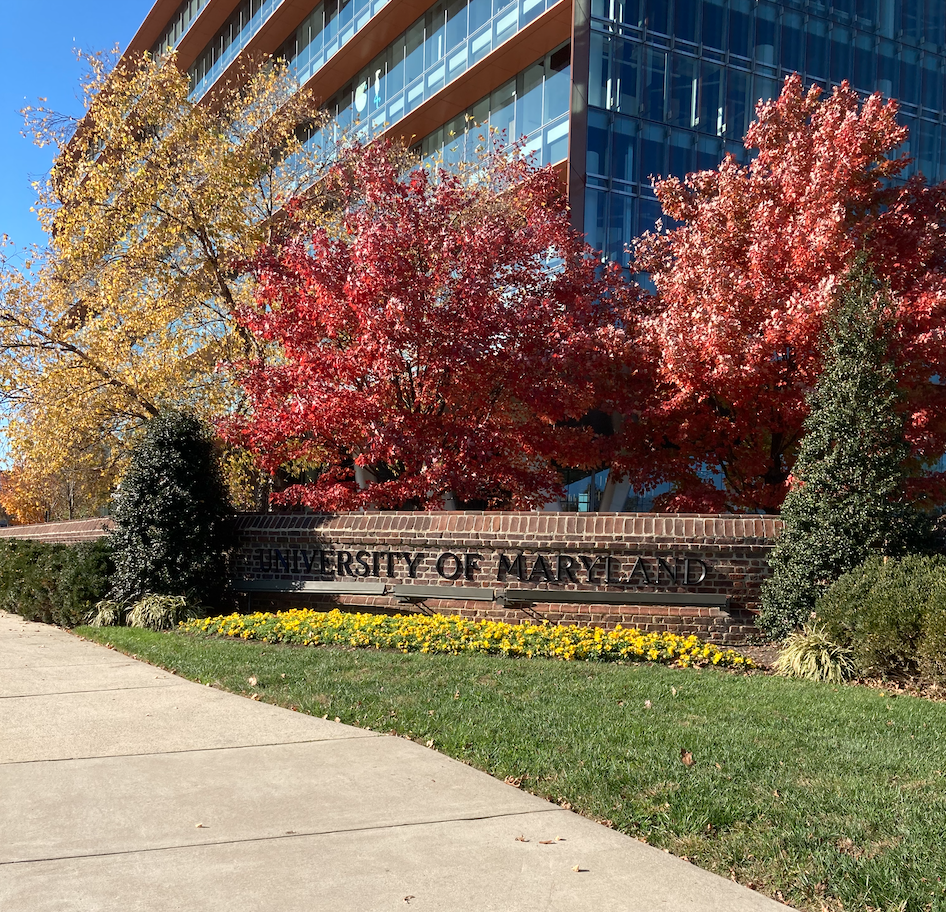
University of Maryland in College Park, Maryland.

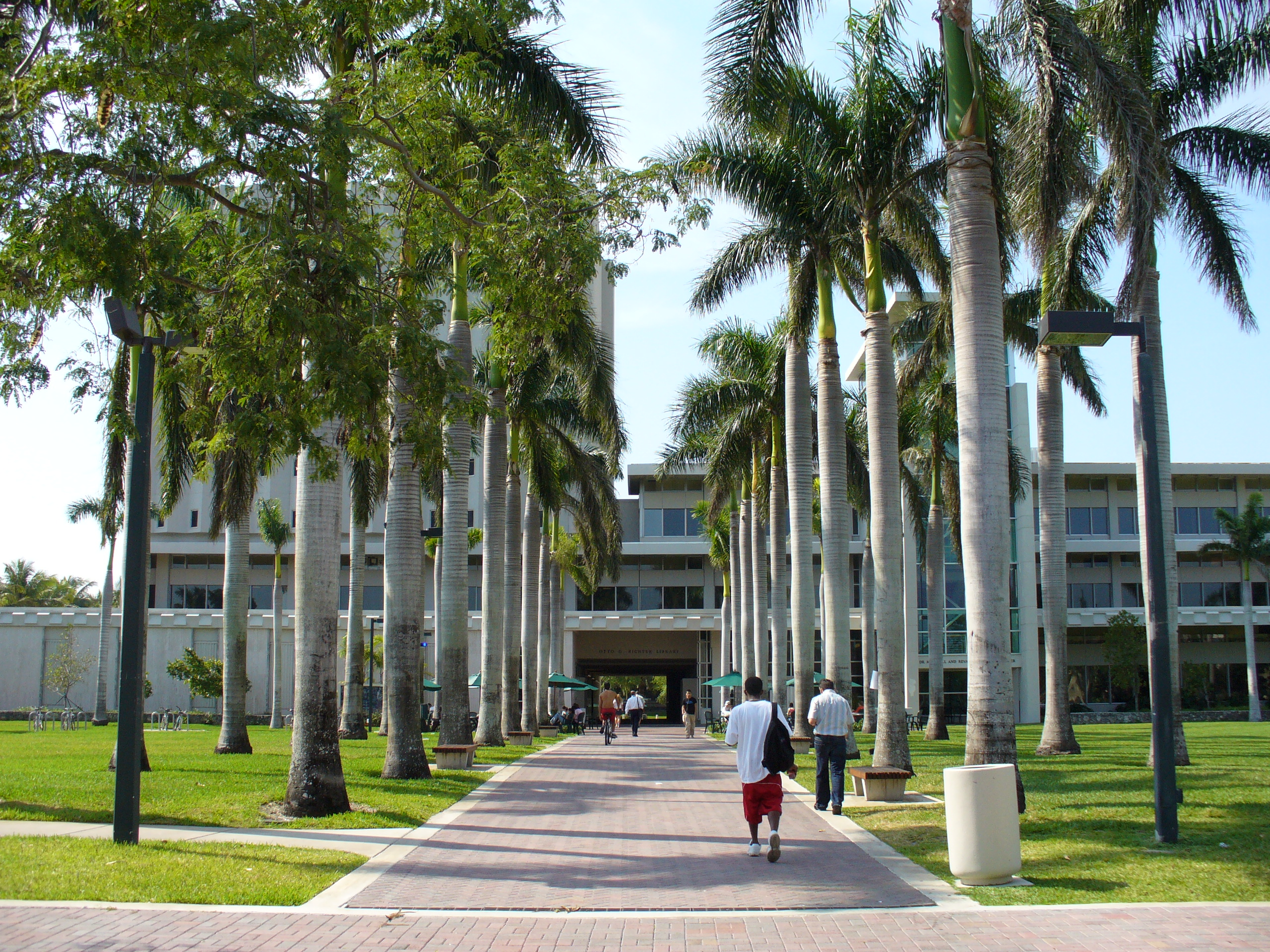
University of Miami in Coral Gables, Florida

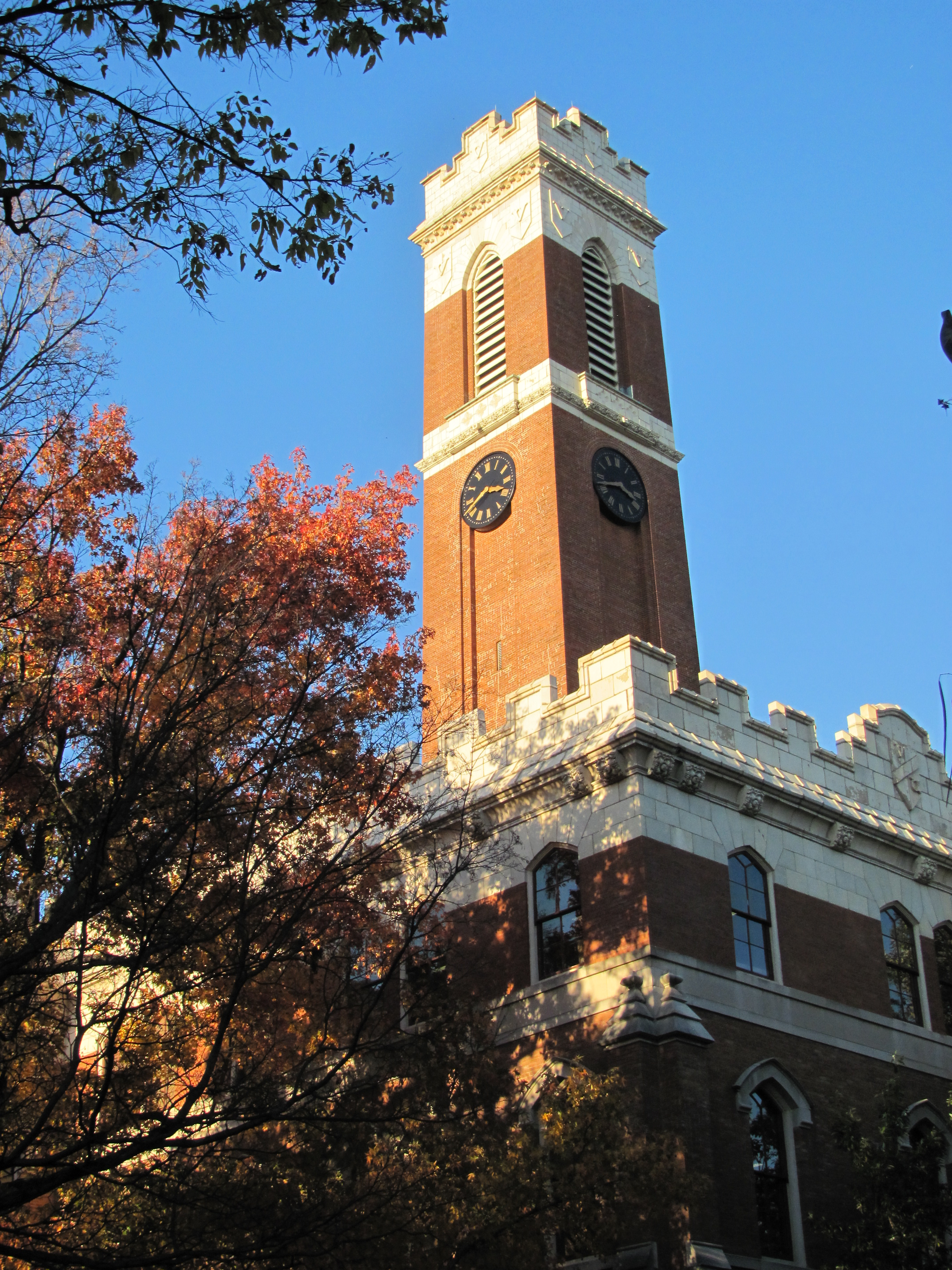
Vanderbilt University in Nashville, Tennessee

- American University
- Belmont University
- Catholic University of America
- Centre College
- Davidson College
- Duke University
- Emory University
- Fisk University
- Furman University
- Georgetown University
- George Washington University
- Howard University
- Johns Hopkins University
- Liberty University
- Mercer University
- Morehouse College
- Rhodes College
- Samford University
- Spelman College
- Tulane University
- Tuskegee University
- University of Miami
- University of Richmond
- Vanderbilt University
- Wake Forest University
- Washington and Lee University

The region is home to the greatest number of historically black colleges and universities in the nation. The three largest in the region are:

- Florida A&M University
- Howard University
- North Carolina A&T State University

== Sports ==
=== Professional ===
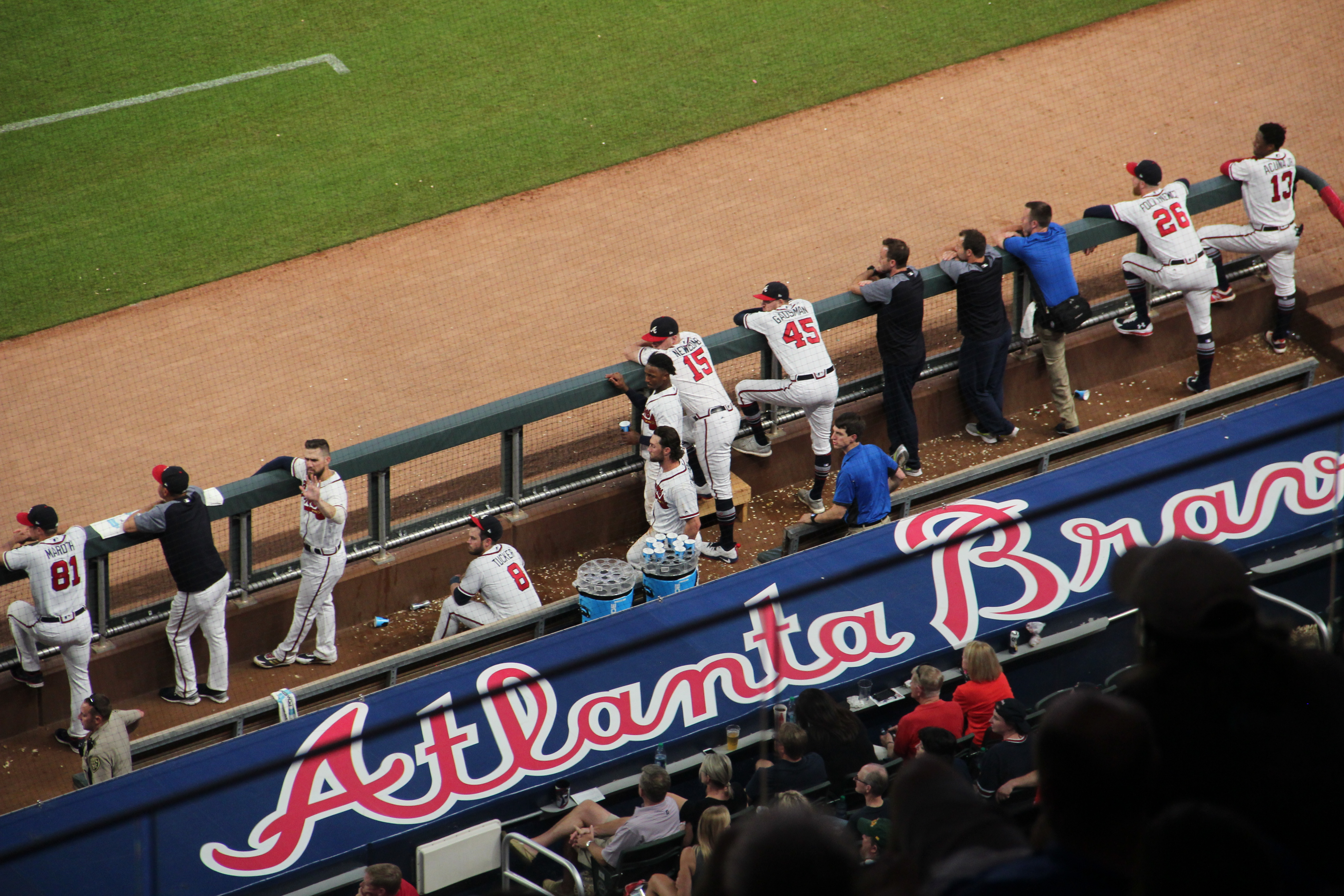
Atlanta Braves

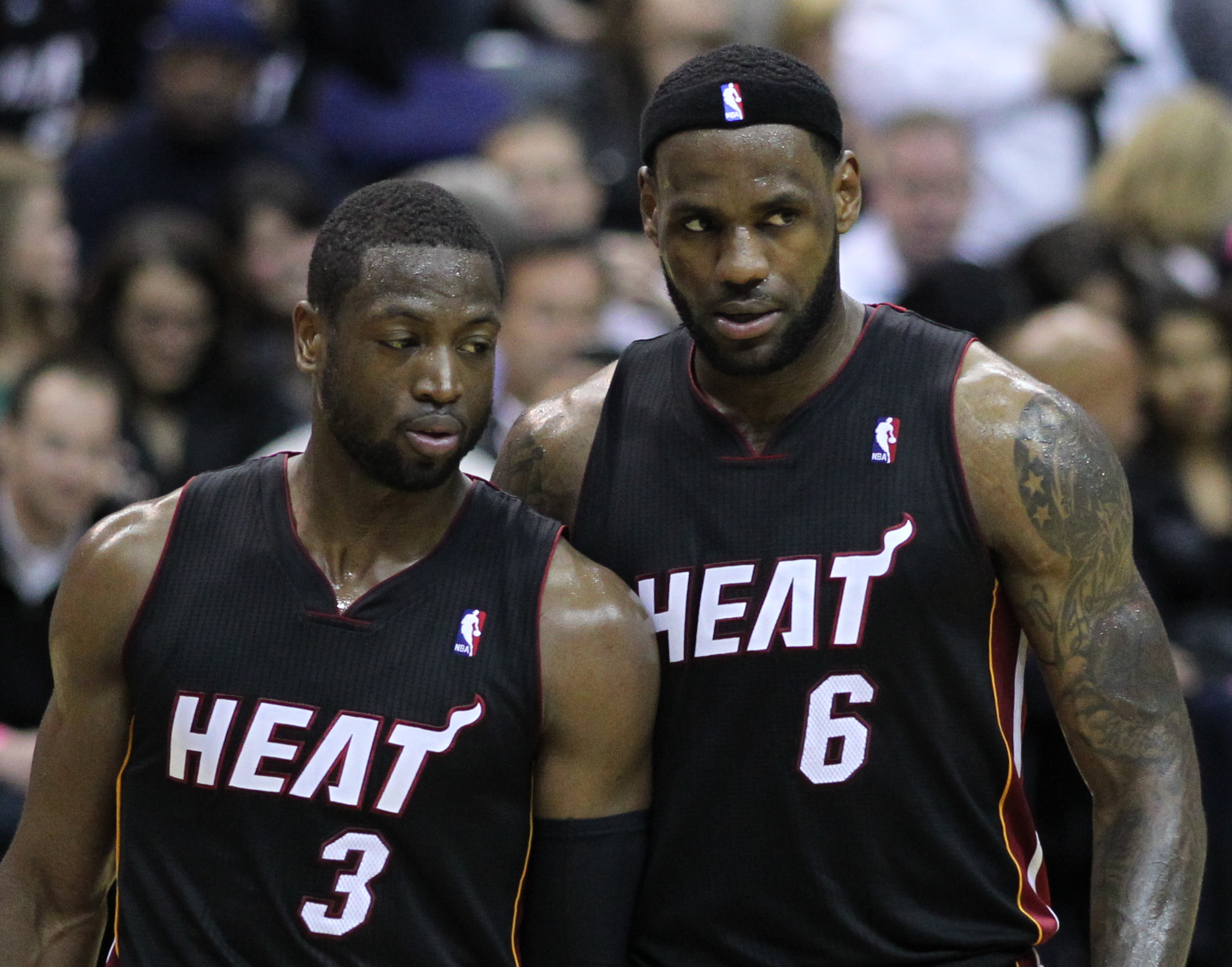
Miami Heat

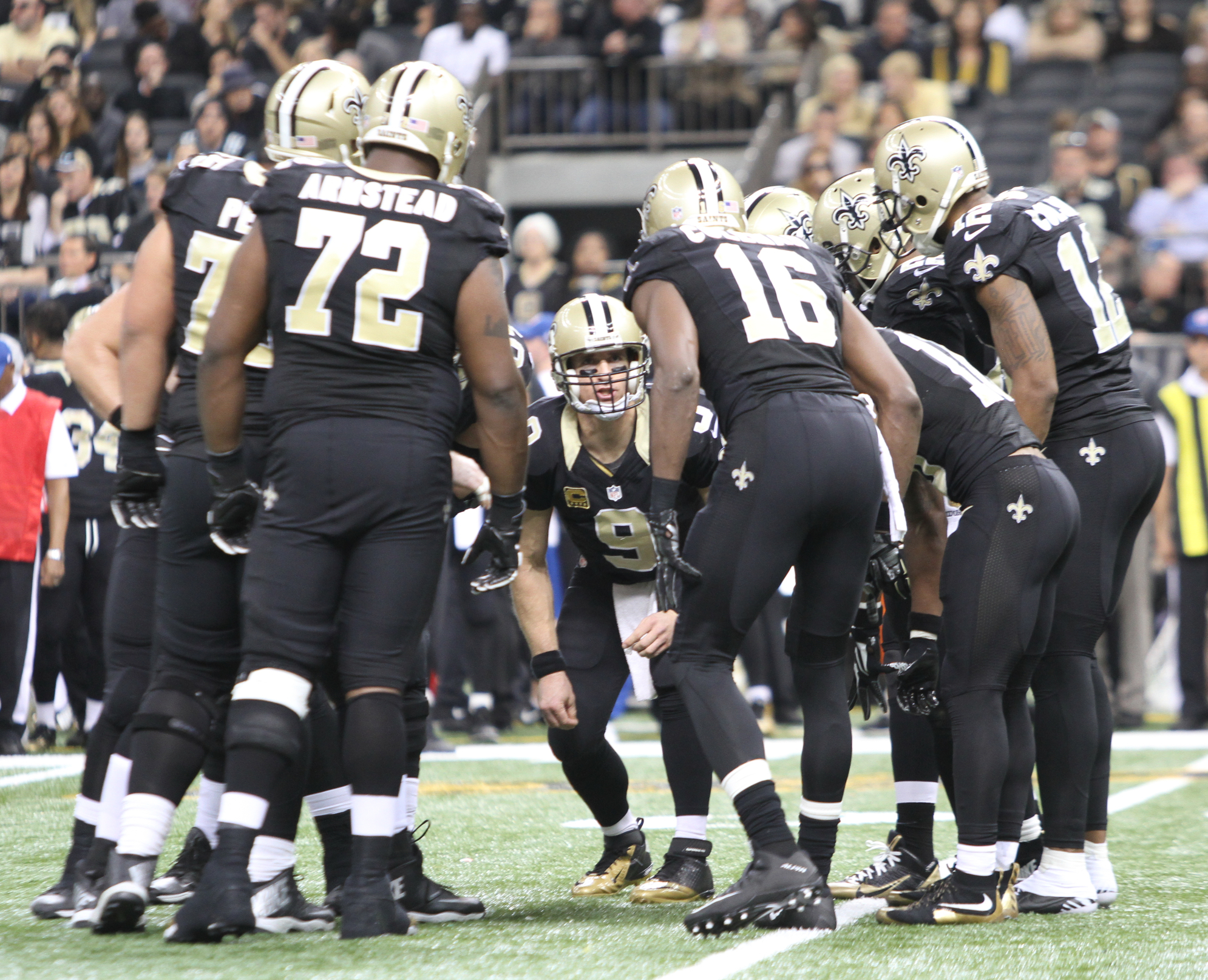
New Orleans Saints

There are nine National Football League (NFL) franchises across the region: the Atlanta Falcons, Baltimore Ravens, Carolina Panthers, Jacksonville Jaguars, Miami Dolphins, New Orleans Saints, Tampa Bay Buccaneers, Tennessee Titans, and Washington Commanders.

The Southeast has seven National Basketball Association (NBA) franchises: the Atlanta Hawks, Charlotte Hornets, Memphis Grizzlies, Miami Heat, New Orleans Pelicans, Orlando Magic, and Washington Wizards.

Major League Baseball (MLB) maintains five teams in the Southeast: the Atlanta Braves, Baltimore Orioles, Miami Marlins, Tampa Bay Rays, and Washington Nationals.

The Southeast has five National Hockey League (NHL) franchises: the Carolina Hurricanes, Florida Panthers, Nashville Predators, Tampa Bay Lightning, and Washington Capitals.

Major League Soccer currently holds six clubs: Atlanta United FC, Charlotte FC, DC United, Inter Miami CF, Nashville SC and Orlando City SC.

The majority of NASCAR teams are headquartered in the Charlotte area along with the sports operations headquarters and media outlets. Tracks in the region include Atlanta Motor Speedway,Bristol Motor Speedway,Charlotte Motor Speedway,Darlington Raceway, Daytona International Speedway, Homestead–Miami Speedway, Martinsville Speedway, Nashville Superspeedway, North Wilkesboro Speedway, Richmond Raceway, and Talladega Superspeedway.

The southeast also hosts two of the three legs of the American Triple Crown: the Kentucky Derby in Louisville, and the Preakness Stakes in Baltimore. The Derby is considered the western leg of the crown and the Preakness is traditionally considered the southern leg.

=== College ===
Atlantic Coast Conference

Southeastern Conference

The Atlantic Coast Conference is an NCAA Division I conference with many Southeastern college teams, including the: Clemson Tigers, Duke Blue Devils, Florida State Seminoles, Georgia Tech Yellow Jackets, Louisville Cardinals, Miami Hurricanes, North Carolina Tar Heels, NC State Wolfpack, Virginia Cavaliers, Virginia Tech Hokies, and Wake Forest Demon Deacons.

The Southeastern Conference is also an NCAA Division I conference made up of Southern college teams, including the: Alabama Crimson Tide, Arkansas Razorbacks, Auburn Tigers, Florida Gators, Georgia Bulldogs, Kentucky Wildcats, LSU Tigers, Oklahoma Sooners, Ole Miss Rebels, Mississippi State Bulldogs, Missouri Tigers, South Carolina Gamecocks, Tennessee Volunteers, Texas A&M Aggies, Texas Longhorns, and Vanderbilt Commodores.

The Sugar Bowl, Orange Bowl, Peach Bowl, Citrus Bowl, and Music City Bowl, are notable college football bowls held in Southeastern cities.

== See also ==
- Appalachia
- Black Belt in the American South
- Deep South
- Hammock (ecology) – Southeastern habitat
- Indigenous peoples of the Southeastern Woodlands
- Southeastern conifer forests – Southeastern habitat
- Southeastern mixed forests – Southeastern habitat
- Upland South
