= Baltimore metropolitan area =

Coordinates: 39°16′59.86″N 76°36′27.6″W

Greater Baltimore
- Metropolitan Statistical Area
- Baltimore–Columbia–Towson, MD; Metropolitan Statistical Area
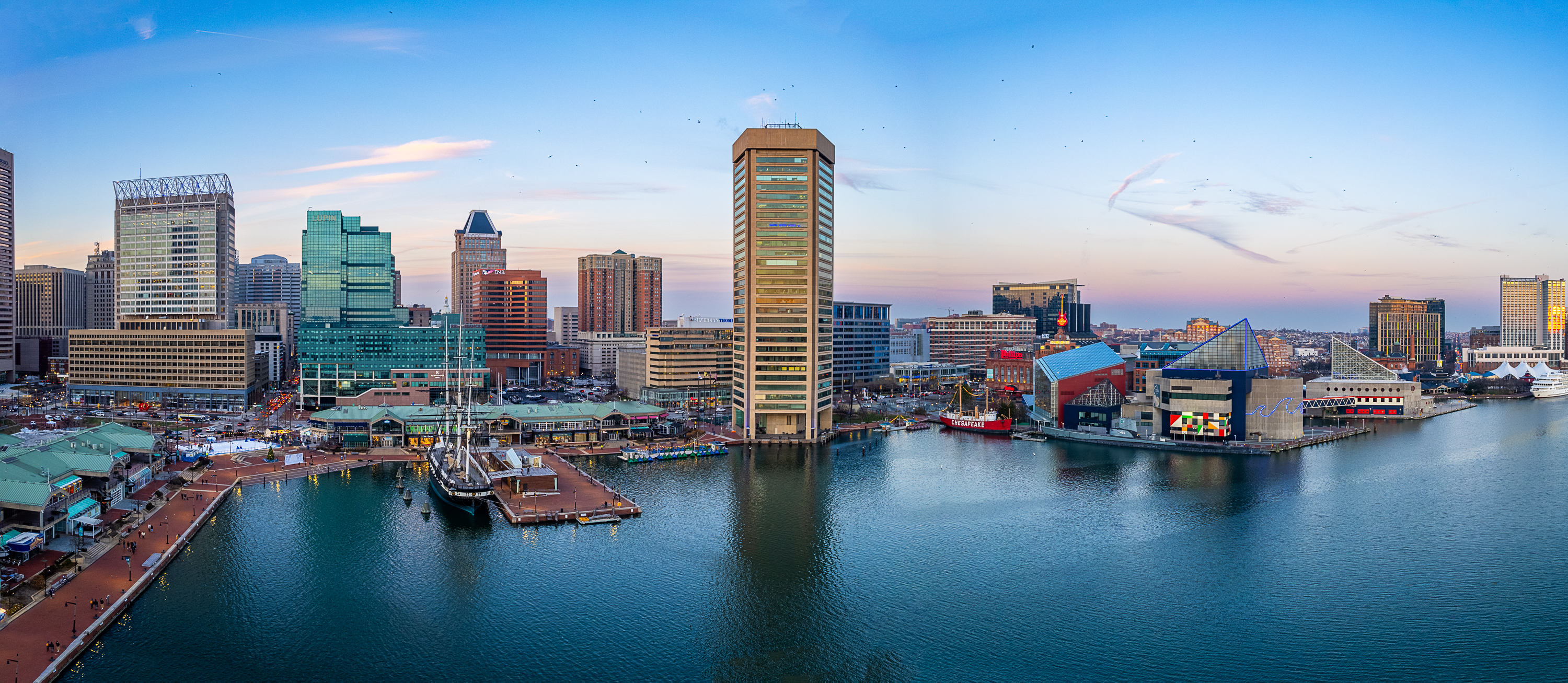
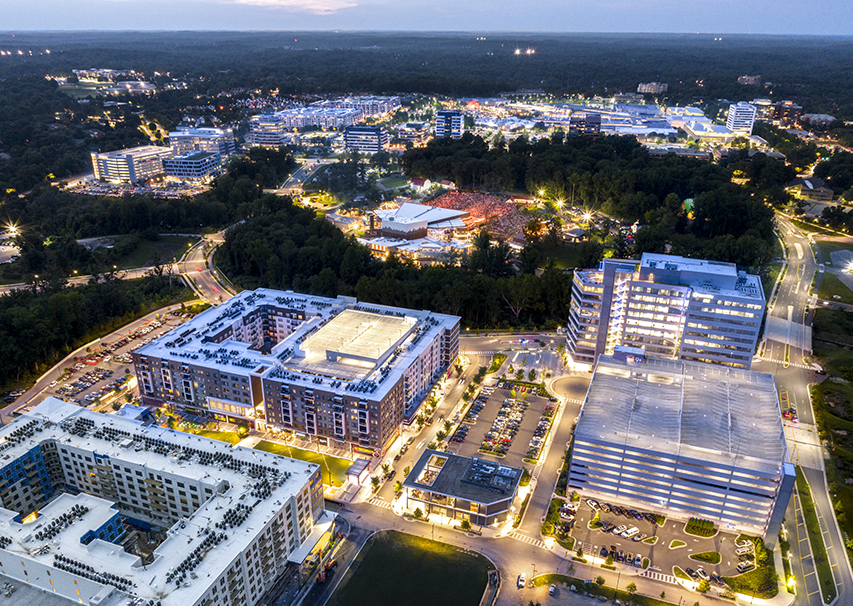
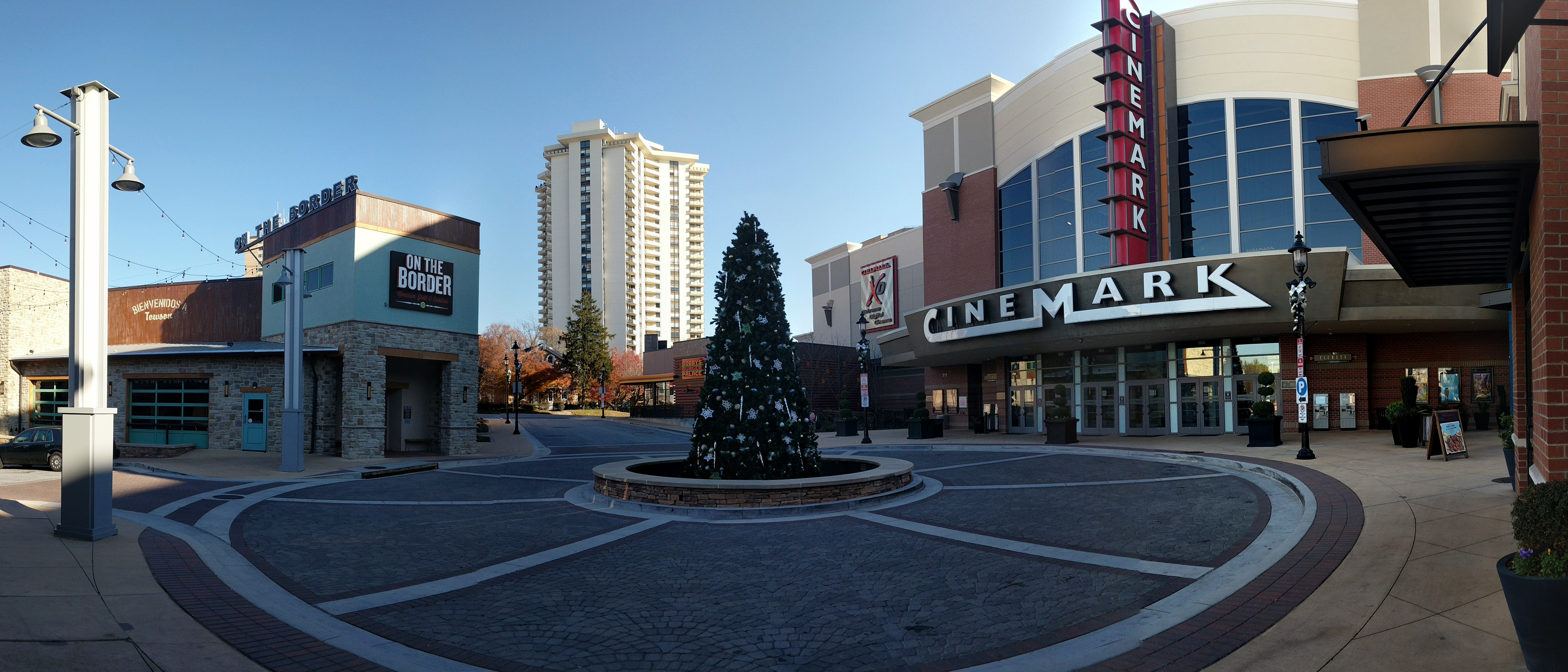
- The Inner Harbor skyline Downtown Columbia Towson Square
Map of Baltimore–Columbia–Towson, MD MSA
City of Baltimore
Baltimore–Columbia–Towson, MD MSA
Other Areas in the Washington–Baltimore CSA
- Country: United States
- State: Maryland
- Principal municipalities: Baltimore; Columbia; Ellicott City; Towson; Glen Burnie; Dundalk; Annapolis

Area (2010)
  - Metropolitan Statistical Area: 2,601 sq mi (6,737 km^{2})

Population (2020)
  - Metropolitan Statistical Area: 2,844,510 (20th)
  - Urban: (19th)
  - Urban density: 1,038.9/sq mi (401.1/km^{2})
  - CSA: 9,973,383 (3rd)
- MSA = 2020, CSA = 2020, Urban & Densities = 2010

GDP
  - Metropolitan Statistical Area: $259.690 billion (2023)
- Time zone: UTC−5:00 (EST)
  - Summer (DST): UTC−4:00 (EDT)

The Baltimore–Columbia–Towson Metropolitan Statistical Area, also known as Central Maryland, is a metropolitan statistical area (MSA) in Maryland as defined by the United States Office of Management and Budget (OMB). It is part of the larger Washington–Baltimore combined statistical area. As of 2025, the combined population of the six counties and the independent city of Baltimore was 2,857,781, making it the 22nd-largest metropolitan statistical area in the nation.

The area has the fourth-highest median household income in the United States, at $66,970 as of 2012.

== Composition ==
The area includes the following counties:

- Anne Arundel County
- Baltimore City
- Baltimore County
- Carroll County
- Harford County
- Howard County
- Queen Anne's County

| County or equivalent | Seat | 2025 Estimate | 2020 Census | Change | Area | Density |
|---|---|---|---|---|---|---|
| Baltimore | Towson | 847,650 | 854,535 | −0.81% | 598.30 sq mi (1,549.6 km^{2}) | 1,417/sq mi (547/km^{2}) |
| Anne Arundel | Annapolis | 603,380 | 588,261 | +2.57% | 414.90 sq mi (1,074.6 km^{2}) | 1,454/sq mi (561/km^{2}) |
| Baltimore city | — | 569,997 | 585,708 | −2.68% | 80.94 sq mi (209.6 km^{2}) | 7,042/sq mi (2,719/km^{2}) |
| Howard | Ellicott City | 339,183 | 332,317 | +2.07% | 250.74 sq mi (649.4 km^{2}) | 1,353/sq mi (522/km^{2}) |
| Harford | Bel Air | 266,446 | 260,924 | +2.12% | 437.09 sq mi (1,132.1 km^{2}) | 610/sq mi (235/km^{2}) |
| Carroll | Westminster | 176,677 | 172,891 | +2.19% | 447.59 sq mi (1,159.3 km^{2}) | 395/sq mi (152/km^{2}) |
| Queen Anne's | Centreville | 54,448 | 49,874 | +9.17% | 371.91 sq mi (963.2 km^{2}) | 146/sq mi (57/km^{2}) |
| Total | | 2,857,781 | 2,844,510 | +0.47% | 2,601.47 sq mi (6,737.8 km^{2}) | 1,099/sq mi (424/km^{2}) |

Historical populations
| Census | Pop. | Note | %± |
|---|---|---|---|
| 1820 | 96,201 | | — |
| 1830 | 120,870 | | 25.6% |
| 1840 | 134,379 | | 11.2% |
| 1850 | 210,646 | | 56.8% |
| 1860 | 266,553 | | 26.5% |
| 1870 | 330,741 | | 24.1% |
| 1880 | 415,649 | | 25.7% |
| 1890 | 507,348 | | 22.1% |
| 1900 | 639,332 | | 26.0% |
| 1910 | 720,387 | | 12.7% |
| 1920 | 852,051 | | 18.3% |
| 1930 | 984,606 | | 15.6% |
| 1940 | 1,083,300 | | 10.0% |
| 1950 | 1,337,373 | | 23.5% |
| 1960 | 1,820,314 | | 36.1% |
| 1970 | 2,089,092 | | 14.8% |
| 1980 | 2,199,531 | | 5.3% |
| 1990 | 2,382,172 | | 8.3% |
| 2000 | 2,552,994 | | 7.2% |
| 2010 | 2,710,489 | | 6.2% |
| 2020 | 2,844,510 | | 4.9% |
| 2025 (est.) | 2,857,781 | | 0.5% |
U.S. Decennial Census; 1790–1960 1900–1990; 1990–2000

== Principal communities ==
As defined by the Office of Management and Budget, the Baltimore–Columbia–Towson metropolitan area includes the following principal communities:

- Baltimore
- Columbia
- Towson

It also includes several other communities (not necessarily incorporated as cities or towns):

- Aberdeen
- Annapolis
- Bel Air
- Catonsville
- Dundalk
- Eldersburg
- Ellicott City
- Edgewood
- Glen Burnie
- Hanover
- Havre de Grace
- Jessup
- Joppatowne
- Nottingham
- Owings Mills
- Perry Hall
- Westminster

In addition to its technical metropolitan area, Baltimore also receives a large number of commuters from cities such as York, Pennsylvania and the Washington metropolitan area.

== Companies in metropolitan Baltimore ==
Four Fortune 1000 companies are headquartered in Greater Baltimore: Grace Chemicals in Columbia and Legg Mason, T. Rowe Price, and McCormick & Company in Hunt Valley.

Other companies headquartered in Greater Baltimore include AAI Corporation and Sinclair Broadcast Group in Hunt Valley and Adams Express Company, Brown Advisory, Alex Brown, First Home Mortgage Corporation, FTI Consulting, Petroleum & Resources Corporation, Prometric, Sylvan Learning, Laureate Education, Under Armour, DAP, DeBaufre Bakeries, Wm. T. Burnett & Co, Old Mutual Financial Network, Fila USA, and Firaxis Games in Sparks.

== Government and infrastructure ==
The capital of Maryland and the agencies of the Maryland state government are located in the Baltimore MSA, mainly in Annapolis and Baltimore City. The area is also home to the National Security Agency (NSA) headquarters in Fort Meade in Anne Arundel County, as well as the Social Security Administration and the Centers for Medicare & Medicaid Services (CMS) in Woodlawn in Baltimore County.

Presidential election results
| Year | DEM | GOP | Others |
|---|---|---|---|
| 2024 | 59.9% 852,369 | 36.7% 521,384 | 3.4% 48,867 |
| 2020 | 61.7% 878,185 | 35.6% 507,676 | 2.7% 38,014 |
| 2016 | 55.8% 733,718 | 37.9% 497,637 | 6.3% 83,046 |
| 2012 | 57.8% 746,052 | 39.8% 513,164 | 2.4% 31,212 |
| 2008 | 57.4% 725,858 | 40.7% 513,811 | 1.9% 24,189 |
| 2004 | 52.2% 602,806 | 46.5% 536,565 | 1.3% 15,019 |
| 2000 | 53.9% 529,648 | 42.6% 418,775 | 3.4% 33,713 |
| 1996 | 52.0% 449,711 | 39.8% 344,488 | 8.2% 71,112 |
| 1992 | 48.8% 489,922 | 35.8% 359,098 | 15.4% 154,849 |
| 1988 | 48.2% 417,858 | 51.1% 443,183 | 0.7% 6,268 |

== Sports teams in metropolitan Baltimore ==
- Baltimore Orioles of Major League Baseball (since 1954)
- Baltimore Ravens of National Football League (since 1996)
- Maryland Whipsnakes of Premier Lacrosse League (since 2024)
- Baltimore Burn of Women's Spring Football League (since 2001)
- Baltimore Nighthawks of the Independent Women's Football League (since 2008)
- Charm City Roller Girls of the Women's Flat Track Derby Association (since 2006)
- Coppin State Eagles
- Johns Hopkins Blue Jays competes in Division I for men's and women's lacrosse only
- Loyola Greyhounds
- Morgan State Bears

In Baltimore County:

- Towson Tigers in Towson
- UMBC Retrievers in Catonsville
- Baltimore Blast of the Major Arena Soccer League (since 2014)

In Anne Arundel County:

- Navy Midshipmen in Annapolis
- Maryland Black Bears in Odenton

== See also ==
- Baltimore–Washington combined statistical area
- Delmarva Peninsula
- Mid-Atlantic states
- Northeast megalopolis
