= Douglas G. Ober =

Douglas G. Ober was the chairman and chief executive officer of two closed-end funds, The Adams Express Company and Petroleum & Resources Corporation, with combined assets of more than $1.7 billion for the year-ended 2009. Both funds have been investment companies, traded on the New York Stock Exchange, since 1929, with Adams Express having previously been involved in a nationwide delivery business. Ober joined the firms in 1980 as a research analyst, became a member of the portfolio management team in 1986, and was elected chairman of the companies in 1991. He retired from his positions in 2013.

== Early career ==
Prior to his employment at Adams Express and Petroleum & Resources, Ober was employed at the First National Bank of Maryland for eight years in commercial lending. Previous employment, from 1968 until 1971, was with the U.S. Naval Air Test Center as a Test Project Engineer.

== Education ==
Ober received his Bachelor of Science in Engineering from Princeton University in 1968, a master's degree in finance from Loyola College in Baltimore, Maryland in 1979, and a certificate from the Advanced Management Program of the Wharton School of the University of Pennsylvania in 1989. He is also a graduate of the U.S. Naval Test Pilot School.

== Associations ==
A Chartered Financial Analyst, Ober is a former member of the Baltimore Security Analysts Society, the New York Society of Security Analysts, and is a past representative of closed-end funds on the board of governors of the Investment Company Institute. He was also a member of the executive committee of the Closed-End Fund Association.
