= Adams Natural Resources Fund =

Adams Natural Resources Fund, formerly Petroleum & Resources Corporation
- Company type: Public (NYSE: PEO)
- Industry: Investment
- Founded: 1929
- Founder: Elisha Walker
- Headquarters: Baltimore, MD, USA
- Key people: Mark E. Stoeckle (Chairman) & (CEO) James P. Haynie (Executive Vice President)
- Website: Official website

Adams Natural Resources Fund, previously Petroleum & Resources Corp. (NYSE: PEO), is a closed-end investment company, specializing in securities of companies engaged in petroleum, natural resources or related industries or in interests in petroleum or natural resources. The company has consistently owned shares of a representative group of oil companies. Realized capital gains have accounted for the major part of distributions paid in recent years. Virtually all net investment income and all capital gains are distributed. Stockholders have the option of taking the capital gains distribution and the year-end dividend from investment income in cash or stock.

== History ==
Petroleum & Resources Corporation began trading on the New York Stock Exchange in January 1929 with a focus on investing primarily in energy and natural resources. Over time, the composition of the portfolio has evolved to reflect the changing dynamics of the global energy and natural resources markets. Today, they define their fund as an “energy and basic materials” fund. While great strides are being made in the development and commercialization of non-petroleum based sources of energy, oil is still the fuel that drives the energy sector and is the major underpinning of the portfolio. As a result, there is a diversified group of investments in the Fund in multi-national companies, as well as exploration, equipment, and service suppliers – all associated with petroleum. However, they are always on the lookout for companies with the potential to provide viable forms of alternative energy, and when appropriate, they invest in companies engaged in coal, nuclear, and hydro-electric power. In addition, they invest in a variety of basic materials, including coal, precious and industrial metals, aggregates, and chemicals.

The Fund's lead portfolio manager, Mark Stoeckle, CEO, succeeded Douglas Ober on February 11, 2013. Mr. Stoeckle has over 30 years of experience in financial services and asset management. James Haynie, Executive Vice President, joined the team in August 2013. They are supported by a team of research analysts that looks for investments that offer long-term earnings growth at a reasonable price.

Trading on the New York Stock Exchange since January 1929, Petroleum & Resources has paid dividends continuously since 1934. The Fund, which is based in Baltimore, Maryland, is widely thought to be one of the earliest “sector funds” to trade on the NYSE.

== See also ==
- Adams Funds
- Douglas G. Ober
