= Doug =

Doug is a male personal name (or, depending on which definition of "personal name" one uses, part of a personal name). It is sometimes a given name (or "first name"), but more often it is a hypocorism (affectionate variation of a personal name) which takes the place of a given name, usually Douglas or Douglass. Notable people with the name include:

== People ==
=== A ===
- Doug Allan (1951–2026), Scottish wildlife cameraman and photographer
- Doug Allison (1846–1916), American baseball player
- Doug Anderson (disambiguation), multiple people
- Doug Applegate (disambiguation), multiple people
- Doug Armstrong (born 1964), Canadian National Hockey League team general manager
- Doug Armstrong (broadcaster) (1931–2015), New Zealand cricketer, television sports broadcaster and politician
- Doug Aronson (born 1964), American football player

=== B ===
- Doug Baldwin (born 1988), American football player
- Doug Baldwin (ice hockey) (1922–2007), Canadian ice hockey player
- Doug Bennett (disambiguation), multiple people
- Doug Bereuter (born 1939), American former politician
- Doug Bing (born 1950/51), Canadian politician
- Doug Bowser (born 1965), former President of Nintendo of America
- Doug Bradley (born 1954), English actor
- Doug Brown (disambiguation), multiple people
- Doug Burgum (born 1956), Governor of North Dakota (2016–present)

=== C ===
- Doug Cameron (disambiguation), multiple people
- Doug Carpenter (born 1942), former National Hockey League head coach
- Doug Chapman (disambiguation), multiple people
- Doug Christie (basketball) (born 1970), American basketball player
- Doug Christie (lawyer) (1946–2013), Canadian lawyer and activist
- Doug Clark (disambiguation), multiple people
- Doug Collins (disambiguation), multiple people
- Doug Cooper (racing driver) (1938–1987), American NASCAR driver
- Doug Costin (born 1997), American football player
- Doug Cowie (footballer) (1926–2021), Scottish footballer
- Doug Cowie (umpire) (born 1946), New Zealand cricket umpire
- Doug Cox (disambiguation), multiple people
- Doug Cunningham (politician) (born 1954), former Nebraska State Senator
- Doug Cunningham (American football) (1945–2015), American former National Football League running back

=== D ===
- Doug Davies (disambiguation), multiple people
- Doug Davis (disambiguation), multiple people
- Douglas DeMuro (born 1988), American automotive journalist
- Doug E. Doug (born Douglas Bourne, 1970) American actor

=== E ===
- Doug Edert (born 2000), American basketball player
- Doug Eggers (1930–2025), American football player
- Doug Eisenman (born 1968), American tennis player
- Doug Elliot (politician) (1917–1989), Australian politician
- Doug Elliott (musician) (born 1962), Canadian musician
- Doug Emhoff (born 1964), husband of Kamala Harris; first Second Gentleman of the United States
- Douglas Engelbart (1925–2013), American engineer, inventor and early computer and Internet pioneer
- Doug Evans (disambiguation), multiple people

=== F ===
- Doug Ferguson (disambiguation), multiple people
- Doug Fieger (1952–2010), American singer-songwriter and musician, member of the rock band The Knack
- Doug Fisher (actor) (1941–2000), British actor
- Doug Fisher (politician) (1919–2009), Canadian politician and columnist
- Doug Flutie (born 1962), American football player
- Doug Ford (disambiguation), multiple people
- Doug Fraser (Australian footballer) (1886–1919), Australian rules footballer
- Doug Fraser (Scottish footballer) (born 1941), Scottish football player and manager
- Doug Frost (swimming coach) (born 1943), Australian swimming coach
- Doug Frost (wine), American Master of Wine, Master Sommelier and author

=== G ===
- John Douglas Gibson (1925/26–1984), usually known as Doug Gibson, Australian ornithologist
- Doug Gillard (born 1965) American guitarist and songwriter
- Doug Graham (disambiguation), multiple people
- Doug Grassel (1949–2013), American guitarist, member of the bubblegum pop band the Ohio Express
- Doug Green (disambiguation), multiple people
- Doug Gurr (born 1964), British businessman

=== H ===
- Doug Hamlin, CEO of the National Rifle Association
- Doug Harris (disambiguation), multiple people
- Doug Harrison (born 1949), Canadian politician
- Doug Harvey (ice hockey) (1924–1989), Canadian National Hockey League player, member of the Hockey Hall of Fame
- Doug Harvey (umpire) (1930–2018), member of the Baseball Hall of Fame
- Doug Henry (baseball) (born 1963), American former Major League Baseball relief pitcher
- Doug Henry (motocross) (born 1969), American former motocross racer, three-time AMA national champion
- Doug Hoyle, Baron Hoyle (1926–2024), British politician
- Doug Hutchison (born 1960), American character actor
- Doug Johnson (disambiguation), multiple people
- Doug Jones (disambiguation), multiple people

=== K ===
- Doug Kelly (footballer), English footballer in the 1950s
- Doug Kershaw (born 1936), American country music fiddle player, singer and songwriter
- Doug Kistler (1938–1980), American basketball player
- Doug Kramer (American football) (born 1998), American football player

=== L ===
- Doug LaMalfa (1960–2026), American politician
- Doug Landry (1964–2015), American football player
- Doug Lawrence (disambiguation), multiple people with the name
- Doug Lee (basketball) (born 1964), American retired National Basketball Association player
- Doug Lewis (disambiguation), multiple people
- Doug Lowe (Australian politician) (born 1942), 35th premier of Tasmania

=== M ===
- Doug MacLeod (musician) (born 1946), American blues musician, guitarist, and songwriter
- Doug MacLeod (TV writer) (1959–2021), Australian screenwriter and author
- Doug Martin (disambiguation), multiple people
- Doug McAdam (born 1951), sociology professor
- Doug McDermott (born 1992), American National Basketball Association player
- Doug McEnulty (1922–1991), American National Football League player
- Doug McIntosh (1945–2021), American basketball player
- Doug McLean, Sr. (1880–1947), Australian rugby union and rugby league player
- Doug McLean, Jr. (1912–1961), Australian rugby union and rugby league player, son of Doug McLean, Sr.
- Doug McClure (1935-1995), American actor
- Doug McClure (born 1964), English footballer
- Doug Mitchell (Canadian football) (born 1942), retired Canadian Football League offensive lineman
- Doug Mitchell (film producer) (born 1952)
- Doug Moe (1938–2026), American basketball player and coach
- Doug Moench (born 1948), American comic book writer
- Doug Mooers (born 1947), American football player
- Doug Morgan (disambiguation), multiple people
- Doug Morneau, Canadian politician
- Doug Mowat (1929–1992), Canadian politician

=== P ===
- Doug Parker (born 1961), American businessman
- Doug Parker (voice actor), Canadian voice actor
- Doug Parkinson (1946–2021), Australian singer
- Doug Parkinson (politician) (born 1945), Australian former politician
- Doug Pederson (born 1968), NFL head coach
- Doug Peterson (yacht designer) (1945–2017), American yacht designer
- Doug Peterson (Nebraska politician) (born 1959), American lawyer and politician
- Doug Plank (born 1953), American football player
- Doug Powell (disambiguation), multiple people
- Doug Ptolemy, Canadian actor who was a cast member on the Canadian sketch comedy TV series You Can't Do That on Television

=== R ===
- Doug Robb (born 1975), American lead singer of Hoobastank
- Doug Roberts (ice hockey) (born 1942), American former National Hockey League and World Hockey Association player
- Doug Robinson (ice hockey) (born 1940), Canadian former National Hockey League player
- Doug Rogers (disambiguation), multiple people
- Doug Rowland (born 1940), Canadian politician

=== S ===
- Doug Shapiro (1959–2025), American racing cyclist
- Doug Smith (disambiguation), multiple people
- Doug Smylie (1922–1983), Canadian Football League player
- Doug Spradley (born 1966), American-German basketball coach and former player
- Doug Stanhope (born 1967), American comedian
- Doug Supernaw (1960–2020), American country music singer-songwriter and musician
- Doug Sutherland (disambiguation), multiple people
- Doug Symons, Canadian politician

=== T ===
- Doug Taitt (1902–1970), American Major League Baseball player and minor league player/manager

=== W ===
- Doug Walker (disambiguation), multiple people
- Doug White (politician), American member of the Ohio House of Representatives (1991–1996) and Senate (1996–2004)
- Doug White (news anchor) (1944–2006), American news anchor
- Doug Williams (disambiguation), multiple people
- Doug Wilson (disambiguation), multiple people
- Doug Wright (disambiguation), multiple people
- Doug Wreden, American YouTuber and Twitch streamer known as DougDoug

== Fictional characters ==
- Doug Billings, one of the main characters in The Hangover Trilogy
- Doug, a baby in the comic strip Dog Eat Doug
- Doug, a character in the 2012 video game The Walking Dead
- Doug Borski, one of the main characters in the Canadian teen-adult animated series Sons of Butcher
- Doug Carter, in the British soap opera Hollyoaks
- Doug Dimmadome, owner of the Dimmsdale Dimmadome, from the TV show Fairly Odd Parents
- Dexter Douglas, a main character in the 1990s animated television series Freakazoid!
- Doug, a koala man from the adult animated sitcom Ugly Americans
- Doug Funnie, the main character in the animated series Doug
- Doug (Godzilla), a Godzilla character
- Doug Heffernan, the main character in the American sitcom The King of Queens
- Doug McKenzie, in the Canadian television show SCTV
- Douglas Potts, in the British soap opera Emmerdale
- Doug Ramsey, Marvel Comics character also known as Cypher
- Doug Swallow, murder victim in Phoenix Wright: Ace Attorney – Trials and Tribulations
- Doug Talpid, also known as The Underminer from The Incredibles
- Doug Whitty, a baby in the American animated sitcom television series Family Guy
- Doug Williams (Days of Our Lives), in the American soap opera Days of Our Lives
- Doug Willis, in the Australian soap opera Neighbours
- Doug Witter, in the television series Dawson's Creek
- Doug Wheeler, in the television series Bob's Burgers
- Douglas, in the television series Bob's Burgers appearing in a performing arts school
- Doug, partner of Limu Emu in commercials.

== Animals ==
- Doug the Pug (born 2012), Internet and social media personality
