= Douglas Bennett =

Douglas or Doug Bennett may refer to:

- Douglas Bennett (canoeist) (1918–2008), Canadian flatwater canoeist
- Douglas Bennett (cricketer, born 1886) (1886–1982), South African cricketer
- Douglas Bennett (cricketer, born 1912) (1912–1984), South African cricketer
- Douglas C. Bennett (born 1946), American academic
- Douglas J. Bennet (1938–2018), president of Wesleyan University, Middletown, Connecticut, United States
- Doug Bennett (footballer) (1894–1975), Australian footballer
- Doug Bennett (Michigan politician) (1945–2021), American politician in the Michigan House of Representatives
- Doug Bennett (musician) (1951–2004), Canadian musician
