= Douglas Wright =

Douglas Wright may refer to:

- Douglas Wright (dancer) (1956–2018), New Zealand dancer and choreographer
- Douglas Wright (physiologist) (1907–1990), Australian academic
- Douglas E. Wright (born 1955), Canadian horror writer
- Douglas Franklin Wright (1940–1996), first criminal executed by lethal injection in Oregon
- Douglas S. Wright (1948–2023), American politician
- Douglas Tyndall Wright (1927–2020), Canadian civil engineer
- Douglas Wright (cricketer) (1894—1953), English cricketer and British Army officer

== See also ==
- Doug Wright (disambiguation)
