= Douglas Smith =

Douglas, Doug or Dougie Smith may refer to:

== Arts and entertainment ==
- Douglas Smith (broadcaster) (1924–1972), British radio broadcaster
- Doug Smith (composer) (1963–2016), American composer and pianist
- Douglas Burnet Smith (born 1949), Canadian poet
- Ivan Stang (born 1953), American author born Douglass St. Clair Smith
- Douglas E. Smith (1960–2014), American video game designer
- Douglas Smith (actor) (born 1985), Canadian-American actor
- Douglas Smith (special effects artist), visual effects artist of Independence Day movie
- Douglas Smith (writer) (born 1962), American writer and historian of Russia

== Politics ==
- Dougie Smith (born 1962), British political advisor
- W. Douglas Smith (born 1958), American politician from South Carolina
- Douglas Smith (Maine politician) (born 1946), American politician from Maine
- Douglas M. Smith (born 1990), American politician from New York
- Doug Smith (politician) (born 1967), American politician from West Virginia

== Sports ==
- Doug Smith (pitcher) (1892–1973), former MLB baseball player
- Doug Smith (baseball coach), American college baseball coach
- Doug Smith (basketball) (born 1969), American former basketball player
- Doug Smith (offensive lineman) (born 1956), retired NFL American football offensive lineman
- Doug Smith (defensive lineman) (born 1960), retired NFL American football defensive lineman
- Doug Smith (defensive back) (born 1963), retired NFL American football defensive back
- Doug Smith (Canadian football) (born 1952), retired CFL Canadian football offensive lineman
- Doug Smith (footballer, born 1937) (1937–2012), Scottish former Dundee United footballer
- Doug Smith (footballer, born 1922) (1922–2009), former Australian rules footballer for Collingwood
- Doug Smith (footballer, born 1957), former Australian rules footballer for North Melbourne
- Douglas Smith (Australian cricketer) (1880–1933), Australian cricketer
- Douglas Smith (English cricketer) (1915–2001), English cricketer
- Douglas Smith (Guyanese cricketer) (1884–?), Guyanese cricketer
- Douglas James Smith (1873–1949), cricketer
- Doug Smith (jockey) (1917–1989), English flat racing jockey
- Doug Smith (ice hockey) (born 1963), former NHL ice hockey player
- Doug Smith (author) (born 1964), former minor-league ice hockey player and author
- Doug Smith (sportscaster) (1920s–1979), Canadian radio broadcaster
- Doug Smith (rugby union) (1924–1998), Scottish rugby union player and administrator
