= Doug Brown =

Doug or Douglas Brown may refer to:

- Doug Brown (Australian footballer) (1923–2012), Australian rules footballer in the Victorian Football League
- Doug Brown (gridiron football) (born 1974), American retired football player in the NFL and the CFL
- Doug Brown (ice hockey) (born 1964), American ice hockey player in the National Hockey League
- Doug Brown (runner, born 1952), American Olympic steeplechase runner
- Doug Brown (runner, born 1944), American long-distance runner, 1965 NCAA 3-mile and 6-mile champion
- Doug Brown (sportscaster), American sports reporter for ESPN Radio
- Dougie Brown (born 1969), Scottish cricketer
- Douglas Brown (cricketer) (born 1972), Jamaican-born cricketer for the Turks and Caicos Islands
- Douglas Clifton Brown, 1st Viscount Ruffside (1879–1958), British politician
- Douglas M. Brown, New Mexico state treasurer
- Douglas Walkden-Brown (1921–2013), Australia-born Fijian politician
- Duggie Brown (soccer) (born 1958), association footballer active in Scotland and Australia
- H. Douglas Brown (born 1942), American professor of English as a second language
- L. Douglas Brown (1907–1964), Canadian Anglican priest
- Douglas Brown (author), American author and market research executive
- Bryan D. Brown (born 1948), known as Doug, U.S. Army general
