= Doug Powell =

Doug Powell may refer to:

- Doug Powell (musician) (born 1965), American musician, Christian apologist, and writer
- Doug Powell (food safety), food safety expert that formerly worked at Kansas State University and now lives in Australia
- Doug Powell (geographer), professor at UC Berkeley
