= Douglas Clark =

Douglas or Doug Clark may refer to:

== Arts ==
- Douglas Clark (poet) (1942–2010), English poet
- Douglas Clark (sculptor), American sculptor
- Doug Clark (died 2002), leader of Doug Clark and the Hot Nuts

== Politics ==
- Doug Clark (Arizona politician), American politician
- Doug Clark (Australian politician) (1927–2008)

== Sports ==
- Douglas Clark (rugby league) (1891–1951), British rugby league footballer, wrestler and World War One veteran
- Doug Clark (baseball) (born 1976), American baseball player

== Other people ==
- Doug Clark (serial killer) (1948–2023), American serial killer
- Doug Clark (investor), American real estate investor
- Douglas Alan Clark (1917–2012), American recipient of the Navy Cross
- Douglas S. Clark (born 1957), American chemical engineer

== See also ==
- Douglas Clarke (disambiguation)
