= Doug Morgan =

Doug Morgan may refer to:

- Dougie Morgan (1947–2020), Scotland international rugby union player
- Doug Morgan (footballer, born 1890) (1890–1916), Scottish football left back
- Doug Morgan (Australian footballer) (1886–1958), Australian rules footballer
