= The Powerstation =

Music venue in Eden Terrace, Auckland

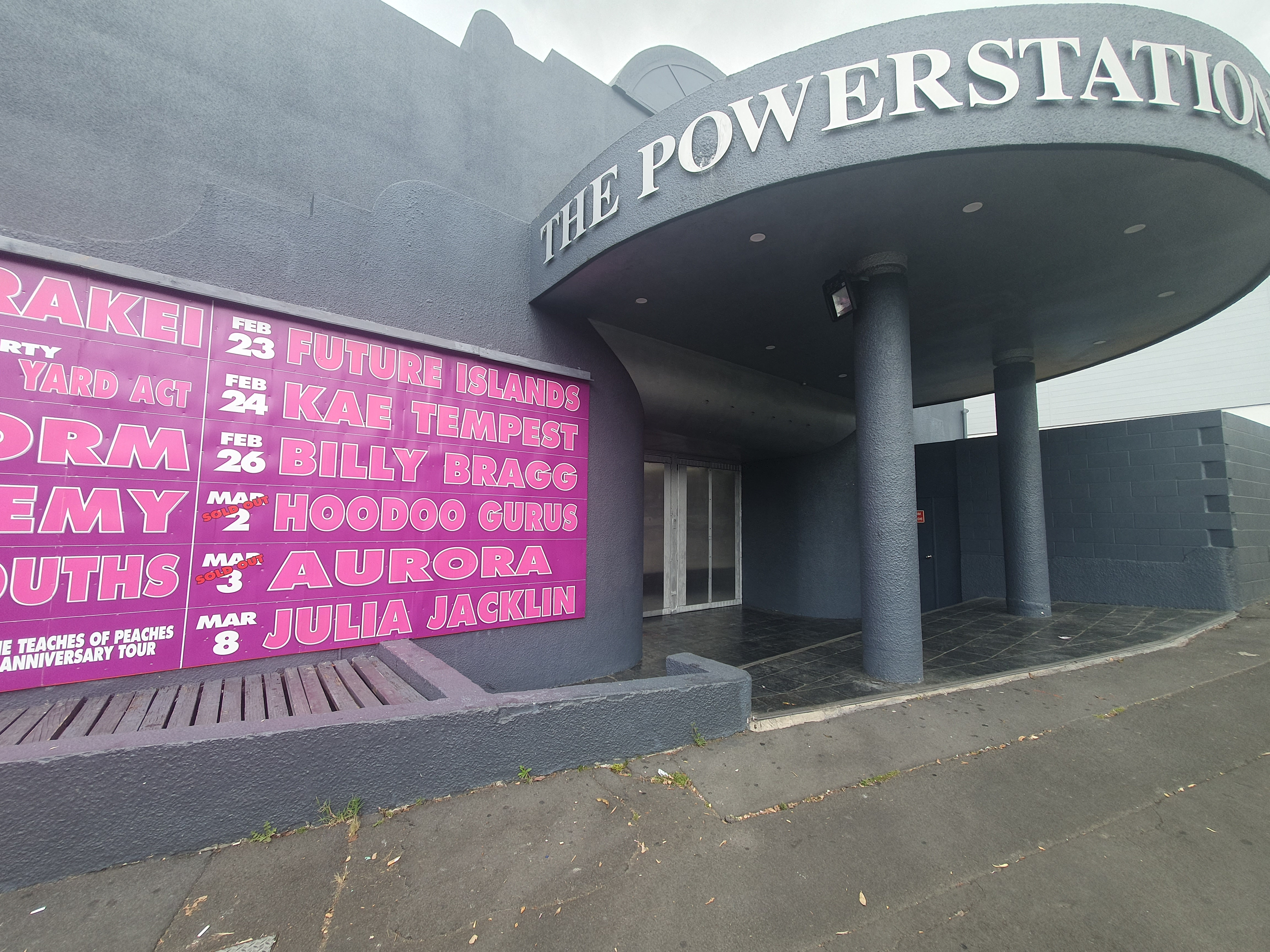
- Interactive map of The Powerstation
- Former names: Galaxy, Bar Retro
- Address: 33 Mount Eden Road, Eden Terrace, 1023; Auckland; New Zealand
- Coordinates: 36.8662441094°S 174.7611817411°E
- Capacity: 1,000

Construction
- Opened: 1950s

Website
- www.powerstation.net.nz

The Powerstation is a music venue in Eden Terrace, Auckland, it is one of the few remaining small music venues in New Zealand. The building has been used as multiple different music venues since the 1950s.

== History ==
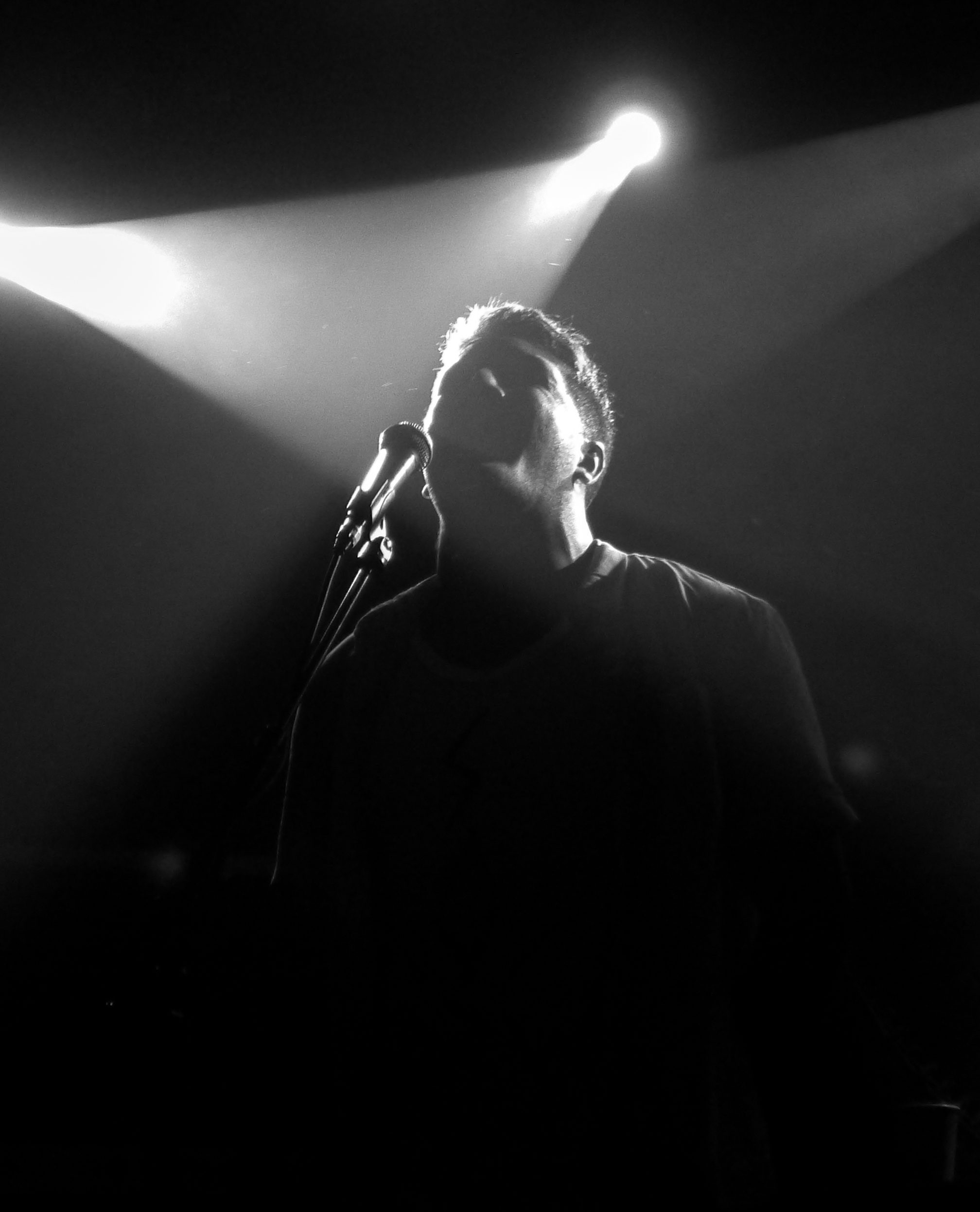
Six60 performing at the Powerstation in 2012

First opened as a "dine-and-dance" venue in the 1950s. By the early 1980s, it was owned by Phil Warren and his partner Don Lillian as Dirty Dicks, a bawdy-themed restaurant. In April 1986, the space became the Galaxy live music venue, still owned by Warren.

In October 1986, Simon Grigg, Roger Perry, and Tom Sampson opened the house music club 'The Asylum' within the Galaxy venue. Whilst initially starting as a club playing hip hop, soul, and funk music, it soon gained a reputation for playing house music, making it the first house music club in Australasia. Grigg described The Asylum as "one of the first clubs that had no colour or race barriers, so the crowd came from south, west, north, east, and central Auckland and mostly happily mixed."

In late 1987, The Asylum's hosts moved on, and Warren and Lillian sold the venue to a consortium led by promoter Chris Cole and recording studio owner Doug Rogers. In April 1988, it reopened as The Powerstation, a name it has had ever since. In 1989, The Powerstation started to host five bands for five dollars glam metal shows - sparking a renewed interest in the genre in Auckland.

By 2008, The Powerstation had turned into an 80s-themed bar called Bar Retro. In 2009, Bar Retro went into receivership, and Peter Campbell bought the venue. He has owned it since.

== Notable performances ==
The Pixies performed their first show in New Zealand in 2010 at the Powerstation.

Lorde's 2017 show had to be urgently rescheduled from the Powerstation to the Bruce Mason Centre as there were liquor-licensing issues for an all-ages gig.

In 2018, the Powerstation agreed to host - then cancelled - an event hosted by far-right speakers Lauren Southern and Stefan Molyneux, generating controversy first for agreeing to host it, and then for cancelling it.
