= Super Bowl curse =

American professional football phenomena

The Super Bowl curse is a phrase that refers to phenomena that may occur in the National Football League (NFL) where the team whose stadium will host the upcoming Super Bowl either misses the playoffs or suffers early postseason elimination.

No Super Bowl host team had managed to reach the title game until the 2020 season, when the Tampa Bay Buccaneers played in Super Bowl LV and won at their home stadium. The next year, the Los Angeles Rams defeated the Cincinnati Bengals in a home game during Super Bowl LVI.

Super Bowl champions rarely win consecutive Super Bowls, compared to other professional sports leagues such as Major League Baseball, the National Basketball Association, and the National Hockey League.

The team that loses the Super Bowl often has a less successful following season and may miss the playoffs.

The term was first used around 1992, when The Washington Post used the term in print. Former NFL General Manager Charley Casserly attributed the curse to such factors as "a shorter offseason (five weeks shorter than the 18 teams that failed to make the playoffs), contract problems, [and] more demand for your players' time". Casserly also noted that "once the season starts, you become the biggest game on everybody's schedule," suggesting that pressure from fans and spectators may also affect a team's performance.

== The home-field advantage curse ==
The home-field curse is said to affect a team if the Super Bowl is played at its home stadium. As of 2025, only two teams have played the Super Bowl in their stadiums, the 2020 Tampa Bay Buccaneers at Raymond James Stadium against the Kansas City Chiefs for Super Bowl LV and the 2021 Los Angeles Rams against the Cincinnati Bengals for Super Bowl LVI at their new home, SoFi Stadium; both host teams won. The Buccaneers are the only team to achieve the feat as the designated home team. Super Bowl LVI also marked the first time Los Angeles had hosted since 1993, when the Super Bowl was played at the Rose Bowl in Pasadena, California. SoFi Stadium had just opened in 2020. Super Bowl LVI was the eighth Super Bowl played in Los Angeles. Only Miami, Florida, home of the Miami Dolphins, and New Orleans, Louisiana, home of the New Orleans Saints, have hosted more Super Bowls (eleven).

Besides the 2020 Buccaneers and 2021 Rams, only two NFL teams have reached the Super Bowl hosted in their home region: the 1984 San Francisco 49ers, who won Super Bowl XIX in Stanford Stadium, rather than Candlestick Park, and the 1979 Los Angeles Rams, who played Super Bowl XIV in the Rose Bowl, rather than the Los Angeles Memorial Coliseum. Besides Stanford Stadium and the Rose Bowl, the only Super Bowl venue that was not the home stadium to an NFL team at the time was Rice Stadium in Houston for Super Bowl VIII: The Houston Oilers had played there previously but moved to the Astrodome several years earlier. The Miami Orange Bowl was the only AFL stadium to host a Super Bowl and the only stadium to host consecutive Super Bowls, hosting Super Bowl II and III. Currently, two stadiums are home to two NFL teams of both conferences: MetLife Stadium in New Jersey, which hosted Super Bowl XLVIII, is the home stadium of two NFL teams—the New York Giants and the New York Jets; SoFi Stadium, which hosted Super Bowl LVI, is the home of the Los Angeles Chargers and the Los Angeles Rams.

Seven teams with Super Bowls in their home venue have qualified for the divisional playoffs: the Dolphins twice in 1994 and 1998, the 2016 Houston Texans, the 2017 Minnesota Vikings, the 2020 Tampa Bay Buccaneers, the 2021 Los Angeles Rams, and the 2025 San Francisco 49ers; and three have qualified to play in the conference championship game: the Vikings in the 2017 NFC Championship Game, the Buccaneers in the 2020 NFC Championship Game, and the Rams in the 2021 NFC Championship Game (the 2021 Rams became the first Super Bowl host team to host a Conference Championship). From 1966 to 2011 (excluding the six Super Bowl games held in a stadium without a professional team), the Super Bowl host team had 18 winning seasons, five split seasons, and 32 losing seasons. Mathematically, the probability of that many losing seasons or more occurring by chance (assuming a 50 percent chance of having a losing season (disregarding .500 seasons)) is 7.69 percent. Beginning with the 2021 season, the NFL stretched to 17 games being played; it is no longer possible to have a split season unless there is a tie game. There are some teams who were the Super Bowl host team that had a winning season, but did not qualify for the playoffs due to their circumstance that kept them out of the playoffs. The Super Bowl host stadium is selected several years before the game is played, regardless of the teams that qualify.

This list of examples is not exhaustive; until 2020, no team had ever qualified and played in the Super Bowl while its home stadium was hosting it, home or away. Furthermore, a Super Bowl host stadium's team has never been the #1 seed nor had the best overall record in the league, as the 2020 Buccaneers were the fifth seed in the NFC, and the 2021 Rams were the fourth seed in the NFC.

=== Host teams that would be the home team ===
Host Team	Host Field	Season	Season Record	Notes
Los Angeles Rams	Los Angeles Memorial Coliseum, Los Angeles, California	1966 (Super Bowl I)	8–6	
Miami Dolphins	Miami Orange Bowl, Miami, Florida	1967 (Super Bowl II)	4–10	The Dolphins lost eight consecutive games beginning in week 4, until they ended the losing streak by beating the Buffalo Bills 17–14 at home in week 13 of the 1967 AFL season. The team struggled on offense and defense, both sides of the ball ranked in the bottom tier of the AFL in many statistical categories. Miami did not win a road game in the 1967 season. The Dolphins would not go winless on the road in a season again until 2007 when they achieved their worst win-loss record in franchise history.
Los Angeles Rams	Los Angeles Memorial Coliseum, Los Angeles, California	1972 (Super Bowl VII)	6–7–1	Started out the season 4–1–1, but lost six of the last eight games.
Houston Oilers	Rice Stadium, Houston, Texas	1973 (Super Bowl VIII)	1–13	
New Orleans Saints	Tulane Stadium, New Orleans, Louisiana	1974 (Super Bowl IX)	5–9	The Saints struggled on offense to score points. Ranking 24th out of 26 teams in points scored. The only teams to score points lower than the Saints during the 1974 season were the Atlanta Falcons and Chicago Bears. The Saints only road win of the season came against the division rival Falcons at Atlanta-Fulton County Stadium. When they ended an 18-game winless streak on the road in their victory against the Atlanta Falcons in week six. From 1972 through 1975, the Saints were 1-26-1 on the road. New Orleans would not win a road game again until the 1976 season when they beat the Kansas City Chiefs.
Miami Dolphins	Miami Orange Bowl, Miami, Florida	1975 (Super Bowl X)	10–4	Did not qualify for the playoffs. This was the first season the NFL instituted a seeding system for the playoffs; four playoff spots were given to a conference, the three division winners were the top three seeds, seeded 1 through 3 according to who had the best regular season record, and a wild card team had the #4 seed who was the conference's non-division winner with the best regular season record. Miami tied with the Baltimore Colts in the AFC East standings with a record of 10–4 for first place, but lost the tiebreaker due to losing both games to the Colts during the season; and the Dolphins lost out on the last playoff spot by being beaten out by the Cincinnati Bengals with an 11–3 record. The Dolphins missed the playoffs for the first time since the AFL-NFL merger.
New Orleans Saints	Louisiana Superdome, New Orleans, Louisiana	1980 (Super Bowl XV)	1–15	Won their only game by a single point. New Orleans head coach Dick Nolan was fired after a 27–7 loss to the Los Angeles Rams on a Monday night game in week 12, his last game with the team. Dick Stanfel, offensive line coach, took over as interim head coach for the final four games of the season. The Saints' defense ranked last in yards (6,218) allowed and points (487) allowed.
San Diego Chargers	Jack Murphy Stadium, San Diego, California	1987 (Super Bowl XXII)	8–7	Started out the season 8–1, but went 0–6 afterward to miss the playoffs. It is the final season for quarterback Dan Fouts and tight end Kellen Winslow.
Tampa Bay Buccaneers	Tampa Stadium, Tampa, Florida	1990 (Super Bowl XXV)	6–10	Started out the season 4–2, with all wins coming against divisional opponents, but then lost six straight games and ended the season with a 6–10 record. Finished second place in the NFC Central due to a four-way tie with the Lions, Packers, and Vikings; the Buccaneers won the tiebreaker over all the other three teams due to a better division record, the Buccaneers were 5–3 in games within the NFC Central, while the other three teams were all 3–5 in games within the division. Head coach Ray Perkins was fired after week 13, after a 5-8 start, with his last game a 23-17 win against the Atlanta Falcons. Tampa Bay finished the season ranked 24th in the NFL on both total yards of offense (4,475) and total yards of defense (5,479). The Buccaneers struggled on both sides of the ball and were bottom tier in several statistical categories.
New Orleans Saints	Louisiana Superdome, New Orleans, Louisiana	1996 (Super Bowl XXXI)	3–13	Jim Mora resigned as head coach after New Orleans lost 19–7 to the Carolina Panthers in week 8. After the game, he had a profanity-laced postgame rant, where he criticized his team for their performance in the game. The Saints were highly ineffective on offense; struggling to score points, convert for first downs, gain yards, run the ball, pass the ball, and often turned the ball over. The team had a disastrous start to the season and started 0-5 for the second straight year. Jim Mora's resignation was due to accumulated frustration over the team's non-winning seasons and decline following their last playoff appearance in the 1992 season. Linebackers coach Rick Venturi took over as interim head coach. The Saints never had more than six wins in a season for the rest of the 1990s. They would not have a winning season again until the 2000 season.
San Diego Chargers	Qualcomm Stadium, San Diego, California	1997 (Super Bowl XXXII)	4–12	Quarterback Stan Humphries was lost for the season after starting eight games because of repeated concussions causing his injury. Backup Craig Whelihan took over as a starter, and the Chargers were winless the rest of the season.
Tampa Bay Buccaneers	Raymond James Stadium, Tampa, Florida	2000 (Super Bowl XXXV)	10–6	Last Super Bowl host to make the playoffs until the 2014 Arizona Cardinals. Missed the opportunity to be the NFC's #2 seed and have a home Divisional Round game before losing in overtime in the final week of the regular season. That loss dropped Tampa Bay down to the #5 seed and starting on the road in the wild-card round, which they would subsequently lose 21–3 to the Philadelphia Eagles.
Houston Texans	Reliant Stadium, Houston, Texas	2003 (Super Bowl XXXVIII)	5–11	
Tampa Bay Buccaneers	Raymond James Stadium, Tampa, Florida	2008 (Super Bowl XLIII)	9–7	Lost final four games of the season after starting 9–3 to miss the playoffs. Jon Gruden was fired as head coach after the season.
Miami Dolphins	Sun Life Stadium, Miami Gardens, Florida	2009 (Super Bowl XLIV)	7–9	Dolphins lost key players to injury throughout the season; quarterback Chad Pennington, running back Ronnie Brown, nose tackle Jason Ferguson, cornerback Will Allen, and other players who made significant contribution to the team. Miami started the season 0-3 but went on a run. The Dolphins reached 7–6 before losing the final three games to go 7–9 to finish the season. Miami was eliminated from playoff contention in week 17 with a loss to the Steelers.
Dallas Cowboys	Cowboys Stadium, Arlington, Texas	2010 (Super Bowl XLV)	6–10	Quarterback Tony Romo got hurt during the Cowboys' week 7 game against the New York Giants and suffered a season-ending injury to his left clavicle. Dallas started the season 1–7. Head coach Wade Phillips was fired after a 45-7 blowout loss to the eventual Super Bowl champion Green Bay Packers in week 9, and assistant head coach and offensive coordinator Jason Garrett became the team's interim head coach. The Cowboys allowed 436 points for the season, which was the most in franchise history at the time, until the record was surpassed by later Dallas teams; 2020, 2024, and 2025.
Indianapolis Colts	Lucas Oil Stadium, Indianapolis, Indiana	2011 (Super Bowl XLVI)	2–14	Quarterback Peyton Manning missed the season due to a neck injury. Ended the Colts’ postseason appearance streak at nine years.
New Orleans Saints	Mercedes-Benz Superdome, New Orleans, Louisiana	2012 (Super Bowl XLVII)	7–9	Head coach Sean Payton was suspended for the season due to Bountygate. The Saints set an NFL record for most total yards allowed by a defense in a season, by giving up 7,042 yards. The defense also ranked 31st out of 32 teams in points allowed, with 454 points allowed for the season. New Orleans had defensive futility for most of the season which held the team back from playoff contention.
New York Jets	MetLife Stadium, East Rutherford, New Jersey	2013 (Super Bowl XLVIII)	8–8	Eliminated from playoff contention after the Jets lost to the Panthers and the Ravens won against the Lions in week 15.
Arizona Cardinals	University of Phoenix Stadium, Glendale, Arizona	2014 (Super Bowl XLIX)	11–5	Cardinals lost quarterbacks Carson Palmer and Drew Stanton to injury prior to playoffs. Arizona would lose to the 7–8–1 Carolina Panthers and NFC South division winner in the wild-card round.
Atlanta Falcons	Mercedes-Benz Stadium, Atlanta, Georgia	2018 (Super Bowl LIII)	7–9	The Falcons would lose several key starters to injury early in the season and were eliminated from playoff contention in Week 15.
Miami Dolphins	Hard Rock Stadium, Miami Gardens, Florida	2019 (Super Bowl LIV)	5–11	The Dolphins were criticized for intentionally losing games after trading Laremy Tunsil, Kenny Stills, and Minkah Fitzpatrick for multiple draft picks. The Dolphins were pounded in their first 4 games, losing by 20+ points, and 163 points allowed in total, while scoring no points in the second halves of those games. Miami started the season 0–7. After they were 3–9, the Steelers beat the Browns 20–13, which mathematically eliminated the Dolphins from playoff contention in Week 13. The Dolphins had the league's lowest total rushing yards on offense (1,156), most defensive points allowed (494), fewest sacks on defense (23), most touchdowns allowed by a pass defense (39), and tied the Carolina Panthers for the most sacks allowed on offense (58). This was the first time since the 1997 season that the Dolphins failed to have a Pro Bowler.
Tampa Bay Buccaneers	Raymond James Stadium, Tampa, Florida	2020 (Super Bowl LV)	11–5	After adding quarterback Tom Brady and running back Leonard Fournette during the offseason in free agency and wide receiver Antonio Brown during the season, the 2020 Tampa Bay Buccaneers became the first team to advance to play in and win the Super Bowl in their home stadium. The team posted their first playoff win since 2002, their first playoff appearance since 2007, and became the first Wild Card team to appear and win in a Super Bowl since the 2010 Packers. The Buccaneers were also the first club to win a Super Bowl without a first-round bye since the 2012 Ravens.
Los Angeles Chargers	SoFi Stadium, Inglewood, California	2021 (Super Bowl LVI)	9–8	Had the chance to get into the playoffs as a Wild Card team heading into the week 18 match against the Las Vegas Raiders, either with a win or a tie. The Chargers would have been the AFC's #7 seed with a win, or the #6 seed with a tie. The game went into overtime and came very close to ending in a tie, where both the Chargers and Raiders would have made the playoffs in such an event. Two seconds remained in the overtime period as the Raiders had possession of the ball, and they were letting time run down before calling a timeout. The Chargers would lose on a last-second field goal when Raiders kicker Daniel Carlson kicked a 47-yard field goal as time expired. This knocked the Chargers out of the playoffs. Meanwhile, the Chargers' co-tenant at SoFi Stadium the Los Angeles Rams made the playoffs and went to and won the Super Bowl.
Arizona Cardinals	State Farm Stadium, Glendale, Arizona	2022 (Super Bowl LVII)	4–13	In a season plagued by off-field drama, following their playoff appearance in 2021, they started at 4–6 in the first 10 games but suffered their third consecutive late-season collapse after going 0–7 in their final 7 games with season-ending injuries to their starters, and inconsistencies on both the offensive and defensive sides of the ball. The offense and defense had struggles. Arizona also had issues with on-field discipline that contributed to their losses. The Cardinals matched a franchise record of 13 losses in a season that was set previously by the 2000 and 2018 teams, and again in 2023, but then surpassed by the 2025 team (14 losses). Arizona lost 8 home games in the 2022 season, surpassing the 2018 team for the most home losses in franchise history. The Cardinals fired coach Kliff Kingsbury after the season.
Las Vegas Raiders	Allegiant Stadium, Paradise, Nevada	2023 (Super Bowl LVIII)	8–9	Fired Josh McDaniels after a 3–5 start, and although interim coach Antonio Pierce rallied the team to a 5–4 finish, failed to make the playoffs. Lost Week 14 against the Minnesota Vikings 3–0 for the first 3–0 loss by any team in 16 seasons. The Raiders were eliminated from playoff contention after losing 23–20 to the Indianapolis Colts in week 17.
New Orleans Saints	Caesars Superdome, New Orleans, Louisiana	2024 (Super Bowl LIX)	5–12	Despite starting the season 2–0 for the second consecutive season with over 40 points scored in both games, the Saints went on a seven-game losing streak for the first time since 1999. On November 4, following a Week 9 loss to the Carolina Panthers, the Saints fired Dennis Allen and promoted assistant head coach and special teams coordinator Darren Rizzi to be the interim head coach. The Saints finished last in the NFC South for the first time since 2008 after a loss to the Buccaneers coupled with the Panthers beating the Falcons in overtime in the final week of the regular season.
Los Angeles Rams	SoFi Stadium, Inglewood, California	2026 (Super Bowl LXI)	–	

=== Host teams that would be the away team ===
Host Team	Host Field	Season	Season Record	Notes
Miami Dolphins	Miami Orange Bowl, Miami, Florida	1968 (Super Bowl III)	5–8–1	This is the Dolphins' only season with exactly five wins until the 2019 season. Their only home win was against the Boston Patriots 38–7 in week 14, and they tied the Buffalo Bills 14-14 in a week 6 game. Miami had a 1-5-1 home record in 1968, only the 2007 and 2010 seasons had a worse home record, with a 1–7 record at home in both of them. The Dolphins had trouble stopping the run, allowing 2,172 rushing yards, the most rushing yards allowed by a run defense in the 1968 AFL season in a 10 team league. The offense was inefficient and the Dolphins struggled to sustain drives. George Wilson signed a one year contract extension as head coach, but got fired after the 1969 season. He was replaced by Don Shula who worked under George Wilson as an assistant coach when they were together on the Detroit Lions from 1960 to 1962. The Dolphins did not have a winning season until 1970 and beyond, when they played games under Don Shula as head coach.
New Orleans Saints	Tulane Stadium, New Orleans, Louisiana	1969 (Super Bowl IV)	5–9	Started the season 0–6. This was the third worst start to a season by the Saints. Only the 1967 and 1980 seasons had more losses before the team won a game; the 1967 Saints team went 0–7 before winning a game, and the 1980 Saints team went 0–14 before winning a game. The Saints pass defense allowed 7.9 yards per-pass-attempt, which was an NFL record at the time for the Super Bowl era. The defense struggled in many other statistical categories; total defensive yards allowed, total passing yards allowed, total passing touchdowns allowed, and producing turnovers. New Orleans also ranked 15th out of 16 teams in points allowed by a defense, with only the Pittsburgh Steelers being worse.
Miami Dolphins	Miami Orange Bowl, Miami, Florida	1970 (Super Bowl V)	10–4	Would lose to the 8–4–2 Raiders in the divisional round.
New Orleans Saints	Tulane Stadium, New Orleans, Louisiana	1971 (Super Bowl VI)	4–8–2	The Saints struggled on both offense and defense. The offense had failures in certain areas; New Orleans gave up the most sacks in the league in the 1971 season, the passing game ranked among the league's worst in certain statistical categories, and the offense was among the worst in total offensive yards. The defense had issues; they were among the league's worst in points allowed, passing touchdowns allowed, total yards allowed, first downs allowed, and the rushing defense struggled to stop the run. The team showed potential with rookie quarterback Archie Manning, who they selected in the 1971 NFL draft, but could not maintain success. The Saints had victories against good teams but struggled against opponents in the other games they lost because of overall poor performance.
New Orleans Saints	Louisiana Superdome, New Orleans, Louisiana	1977 (Super Bowl XII)	3–11	Became the first team to lose a game to the Tampa Bay Buccaneers, in a home game. The Buccaneers were in their second season in the league as a franchise and they had a 26-game losing streak prior to beating the Saints 33–14 in week 13 as the road team, and New Orleans was scoreless until the fourth quarter of the game. The team had poor defensive play, they struggled against both the run and pass. The Saints' defense struggled to contain opponents, giving up a lot of points and yards. The Saints' offense struggled to convert on first downs and third downs. They were among the league's worst in total yards of offense, total passing yards, interceptions thrown, and sacks allowed. Head coach Hank Stram had a record of 7–21 in his two seasons with the New Orleans Saints. After the season he was fired.
Miami Dolphins	Miami Orange Bowl, Miami, Florida	1978 (Super Bowl XIII)	11–5	Tied the New England Patriots with an 11–5 record in the AFC East standings to finish the 1978 season, but lost the tiebreaker to New England, as the Patriots had a better division record, so the Dolphins finished in second place in the AFC East division. However, the Dolphins hosted a playoff game despite not winning their division due to a change in structure that enabled the 4th seed to have a home playoff game. This was the first year where a second wild card team was added to the playoffs, a fifth seed in each of the AFC and NFC conferences. The two wild card teams played each other in the first round of the playoffs under the adjusted formula of the playoff system. The Dolphins were the 4th seed and the Oilers were the 5th seed in the AFC. Miami would host the Houston Oilers in the Wild Card game and lost.
Detroit Lions	Pontiac Silverdome, Pontiac, Michigan	1981 (Super Bowl XVI)	8–8	Had the chance to get into the playoffs and win the NFC Central division entering the final week of the season, but lost to the Tampa Bay Buccaneers in a game that decided both of those things. Both the Buccaneers and Lions were vying for the division and the number three seed in the NFC, and the loser could not get in the playoffs as a wild card team because the New York Giants and Philadelphia Eagles had the two wild card spots with a better record. Previously, the Lions were undefeated in their home games; from 1980 through 1981 Detroit had only lost two home games, their previous home loss was during the 1980 season, when they lost to the Baltimore Colts and Chicago Bears. They would lose their only home game of the 1981 season, and the Lions finished in second place behind the Buccaneers in the NFC Central division with a record of 8-8. Detroit would miss the playoffs as a result of losing the decisive game to Tampa Bay.
Tampa Bay Buccaneers	Tampa Stadium, Tampa, Florida	1983 (Super Bowl XVIII)	2–14	Started the season 0–9. Quarterback Doug Williams sat out the season due to a bitter contract dispute with the Tampa Bay Buccaneers. Injuries plagued the team.
New Orleans Saints	Louisiana Superdome, New Orleans, Louisiana	1985 (Super Bowl XX)	5–11	Bum Phillips resigned as head coach midway through the season. Prior to resigning, he stated he would resign if the team failed to finish with a .500 record. The Saints lost the first two games, followed by three consecutive wins, then the Saints went on a six-game losing streak, and ended the skid against the Minnesota Vikings. After the victory against the Vikings, Bum Phillips resigned. His decision was largely due to the team's constant struggle under his leadership. Wade Phillips, son of Bum Phillips and defensive coordinator of the team, took over as interim head coach for the final four games. The following year Jim Mora took over as head coach. Jim Mora would do the same thing as his predecessor, Bum Phillips, in resigning eleven years later.
Miami Dolphins	Joe Robbie Stadium, Miami, Florida	1988 (Super Bowl XXIII)	6–10	Had a three-game winning streak in the middle of the 1988 season, but went 2–7 in the last nine games of the season to miss the playoffs. This was the third straight season where the Dolphins missed the playoffs, and their first losing season since the 1976 season. Miami went 0–8 in the division against their AFC East opponents. The running game was the worst in the league, gaining 1,205 rushing yards, ranking last at 28th among all teams. The defense ranked 26th out of 28 teams in yards allowed (5,781) and 24th out of 28 teams in points allowed (380). Despite setting a record for fewest sacks allowed in a season, and a potent passing game, the Dolphins failed because of the weaknesses that affected the team's overall play. The team had off-field distractions that contributed to their struggles and a 6–10 record. This would be the Dolphins' worst and last losing season under head coach Don Shula, and only season below an 8–8 record with quarterback Dan Marino. The Dolphins did not have a losing season again until the 2004 season.
New Orleans Saints	Louisiana Superdome, New Orleans, Louisiana	1989 (Super Bowl XXIV)	9–7	After losing to the Rams in week 12, where their playoff hopes were dealt a devastating blow, the Saints were eliminated from playoff contention when they lost to the Lions in week 13. They had four straight losses early in the season that put the team in a hole. All seven of their losses were against teams in the conference, which caused the Saints to lose tiebreakers to the teams they lost to. The Saints missed the playoffs in a strong and competitive NFC, where many teams had 10 or more wins. Quarterback Bobby Hebert was benched for backup John Fourcade who started the last three games. The 1989 season would be the Saints' best record in a season where they were the Super Bowl host team.
Minnesota Vikings	Hubert H. Humphrey Metrodome, Minneapolis, Minnesota	1991 (Super Bowl XXVI)	8–8	Vikings released Herschel Walker when the season was over after a disappointing experience with the running back.
Atlanta Falcons	Georgia Dome, Atlanta, Georgia	1993 (Super Bowl XXVIII)	6–10	
Miami Dolphins	Joe Robbie Stadium, Miami, Florida	1994 (Super Bowl XXIX)	10–6	Lost 22–21 to the eventual AFC champion San Diego Chargers during the divisional round, despite having a 21–6 lead at halftime.
Arizona Cardinals	Sun Devil Stadium, Tempe, Arizona	1995 (Super Bowl XXX)	4–12	
Miami Dolphins	Joe Robbie Stadium, Miami Gardens, Florida	1998 (Super Bowl XXXIII)	10–6	Lost 38–3 to the defending Super Bowl champion Denver Broncos during the divisional round.
Atlanta Falcons	Georgia Dome, Atlanta, Georgia	1999 (Super Bowl XXXIV)	5–11	Running back Jamal Anderson was lost for the season after Game 2. In the previous season, they held a 14–2 record and lost Super Bowl XXXIII.
New Orleans Saints	Louisiana Superdome, New Orleans, Louisiana	2001 (Super Bowl XXXVI)	7–9	Lost final four games of the season after starting 7–5 to miss the playoffs. The Saints were outscored 160-52 in their final four games.
San Diego Chargers	Qualcomm Stadium, San Diego, California	2002 (Super Bowl XXXVII)	8–8	Started out the season 6–1, but finished 2–7 the rest of the way.
Jacksonville Jaguars	Alltel Stadium, Jacksonville, Florida	2004 (Super Bowl XXXIX)	9–7	The Jaguars' playoff chances were spoiled and dealt a critical blow when they got shut out by the Houston Texans 21–0 in week 16. The loss ultimately eliminated the Jaguars from the playoffs. Jacksonville struggled to score points in the first quarter in most games during the season. The Jaguars ranked 29th out of 32 teams in points scored, with the offense scoring 261 points for the season.
Detroit Lions	Ford Field, Detroit, Michigan	2005 (Super Bowl XL)	5–11	Fired coach Steve Mariucci after a 4–7 start. The Lions scored a total of 254 points for the season. The lowest amount of points produced in the 21st century by the franchise. The Lions' offense was bottom tier in points scored, total offensive yards, total passing yards, total rushing yards, yards per play, total first downs, passing touchdowns, and interceptions thrown. Detroit struggled on offense with both Joey Harrington and Jeff Garcia as the starters at quarterback for the team.
Miami Dolphins	Dolphin Stadium, Miami Gardens, Florida	2006 (Super Bowl XLI)	6–10	Started the season 1–6 going into the bye week. After the bye week Miami won five out of six games, getting to a 6-7 record. The Dolphins had a strong defense that carried the team, but they were heavily hindered by an offense that was inept. The offense scored 260 points, ranking 29th out of 32 NFL teams in total points scored. Miami averaged 4.8 yards per play on offense. Their passing game had poor efficiency and lacked the playmakers to beat defenses. The team struggled with Daunte Culpepper and Joey Harrington starting at quarterback for the offense. A 21-0 loss to the Buffalo Bills in week 15 eliminated the Dolphins from playoff contention, and they lost the final three games in 2006. Coach Nick Saban left after two seasons with the team, his only seasons as NFL coach, to take the University of Alabama coaching position where he would go on to have a legendary career.
Arizona Cardinals	University of Phoenix Stadium, Glendale, Arizona	2007 (Super Bowl XLII)	8–8	Eliminated from playoff contention after the Cardinals lost to the Saints and the Vikings won against the Bears in week 15. The next season Arizona won the NFC West division with a 9–7 record and went to Super Bowl XLIII.
New York Giants	MetLife Stadium, East Rutherford, New Jersey	2013 (Super Bowl XLVIII)	7–9	The team started the season with a horrific 0–6 record and failed to recover despite playing better in the final ten games of the season.
San Francisco 49ers	Levi's Stadium, Santa Clara, California	2015 (Super Bowl 50)	5–11	49ers had fired Jim Harbaugh due to a dispute with the team's front office.
Houston Texans	NRG Stadium, Houston, Texas	2016 (Super Bowl LI)	9–7	Lost 34–16 to the eventual Super Bowl champion New England Patriots during the divisional round. Despite losing J.J. Watt to injury for the season after three games the Texans overcame the loss of their star defensive end, and the defense found ways to perform without him.
Minnesota Vikings	U.S. Bank Stadium, Minneapolis, Minnesota	2017 (Super Bowl LII)	13–3	Were the first team to host a Divisional Round game while being the host Super Bowl stadium in the same season. The Vikings' last-second 29–24 victory over the Saints would catapult them to the NFC Championship Game against the Eagles, and many expected the Vikings to win. The eventual Super Bowl champions defeated the Vikings 38–7 despite this. Until 2020, this was the closest a home field team ever came to hosting the Super Bowl.
Los Angeles Rams	SoFi Stadium, Inglewood, California	2021 (Super Bowl LVI)	12–5	Second team to win at their home stadium. First to achieve the feat as the designated away team. Coincidentally, they had to beat the Tampa Bay Buccaneers to accomplish the feat, and won against them 30–27 in the divisional round. The Rams are the only team to play a home game in the playoffs and playing in the big game while being the stadium's Super Bowl host team. The team played home playoff games against the Arizona Cardinals in the wild card round and the San Francisco 49ers in the NFC Championship Game, both who are NFC West foes. The Rams were the winner of the NFC West division in the 2021 NFL season.
San Francisco 49ers	Levi's Stadium, Santa Clara, California	2025 (Super Bowl LX)	12–5	The 49ers entered the playoffs as a Wild Card team for the first time since 2021. They opened their playoff run by defeating the defending champion Philadelphia Eagles in the Wild Card Round. They then faced the division rival and top-seeded Seattle Seahawks in the Divisional Round, where their season ended with a 41–6 blowout loss. The 49ers suffered injury to many players at different points in the season. However, they battled through the severity of losing players and had a winning season in spite of the injuries.
Los Angeles Chargers	SoFi Stadium, Inglewood, California	2026 (Super Bowl LXI)	–	

== The Non-Repeat Curse ==
Since 1993, few winning teams have followed up their Super Bowl appearances with a second Super Bowl appearance or even advanced to a conference title game in the subsequent season (the 1994 Dallas Cowboys qualified for their conference title but did not qualify for the Super Bowl). Only seven teams have won back-to-back Super Bowl championships, and only one of these seven have made more than two consecutive winning appearances in the Super Bowl. The only franchise to reach more than three straight title games was the Buffalo Bills who lost four Super Bowls from 1990 to 1993. The hard salary cap, draft, free agency, schedule, generally large team roster, and generally high injury rate of the sport make it more difficult to win repeat league championships in the NFL compared to other major North American professional sports leagues (Major League Baseball, the National Basketball Association, and the National Hockey League) where dynasties have been prevalent.

Between the 2004 and 2022 season, no incumbent holder had managed to successfully defend their title until the 2023 Kansas City Chiefs with wins in Super Bowl LVII and LVIII. Between 2006 and 2013, every defending Super Bowl champion would conclude the following season either losing their opening playoff game or failing to qualify for the playoffs.

This list of examples includes every team that has ever had back-to-back appearances at the Super Bowl.

Team	First Super Bowl Appearance	Score	Second Super Bowl Appearance	Score	Third Super Bowl Appearance	Score	Fourth Super Bowl Appearance	Score
Green Bay Packers	1966 (Super Bowl I)	35–10	1967 (Super Bowl II)	33–14	—	—	—	–
Dallas Cowboys	1970 (Super Bowl V)	13–16	1971 (Super Bowl VI)	24–3	—	—	—	–
Miami Dolphins	1971 (Super Bowl VI)	3–24	1972 (Super Bowl VII)	14–7	1973 (Super Bowl VIII)	24–7	—	—
Pittsburgh Steelers	1974 (Super Bowl IX)	16–6	1975 (Super Bowl X)	21–17	—	—	—	—
Dallas Cowboys	1977 (Super Bowl XII)	27–10	1978 (Super Bowl XIII)	31–35	—	—	—	—
Pittsburgh Steelers	1978 (Super Bowl XIII)	35–31	1979 (Super Bowl XIV)	31–19	—	—	—	—
Washington Redskins	1982 (Super Bowl XVII)	27–17	1983 (Super Bowl XVIII)	9–38	—	—	—	—
San Francisco 49ers	1988 (Super Bowl XXIII)	20–16	1989 (Super Bowl XXIV)	55–10	—	—	—	—
Buffalo Bills	1990 (Super Bowl XXV)	19–20	1991 (Super Bowl XXVI)	24–37	1992 (Super Bowl XXVII)	17–52	1993 (Super Bowl XXVIII)	13–30
Dallas Cowboys	1992 (Super Bowl XXVII)	52–17	1993 (Super Bowl XXVIII)	30–13	—	—	—	—
Green Bay Packers	1996 (Super Bowl XXXI)	35–21	1997 (Super Bowl XXXII)	24–31	—	—	—	—
Denver Broncos	1997 (Super Bowl XXXII)	31–24	1998 (Super Bowl XXXIII)	34–19	—	—	—	—
New England Patriots	2003 (Super Bowl XXXVIII)	32–29	2004 (Super Bowl XXXIX)	24–21	—	—	—	—
Seattle Seahawks	2013 (Super Bowl XLVIII)	43–8	2014 (Super Bowl XLIX)	24–28	—	—	—	—
New England Patriots	2016 (Super Bowl LI)	34–28 (OT)	2017 (Super Bowl LII)	33–41	2018 (Super Bowl LIII)	13–3	—	—
Kansas City Chiefs	2019 (Super Bowl LIV)	31–20	2020 (Super Bowl LV)	9–31	—	—	—	—
Kansas City Chiefs	2022 (Super Bowl LVII)	38–35	2023 (Super Bowl LVIII)	25–22 (OT)	2024 (Super Bowl LIX)	22–40	—	—

== The "Super Bowl Runner-Up Jinx" ==
Although many teams experience this phenomenon, it is certainly not the rule. There are many speculations made about potential causal factors for this trend, including the team having a shorter offseason due to their extended postseason play, difficulty settling contracts, more pressure on the players, and an increase in visibility, which could contribute to nervous playing. Only the 1971 Dallas Cowboys, 1972 Miami Dolphins, and 2018 New England Patriots have followed up a Super Bowl defeat with a Super Bowl win the following season.

One feature of the Super Bowl Runner-Up Jinx is that the team that loses the Super Bowl will not advance as far as the conference championship game the following season — something only three of the last 27 such teams have done (the Patriots twice). Not only that, but 12 of these 27 Super Bowl runners-up did not even make the playoffs the year after, including four that finished last in their division.

This list of examples is not exhaustive.

Examples
Team	Super Bowl season	Record	Super Bowl score	Next season	Record
Kansas City Chiefs	1966 (Super Bowl I)	11–2–1	10–35	1967	9–5
Baltimore Colts	1968 (Super Bowl III)	13–1	7–16	1969	8–5–1
Denver Broncos	1987 (Super Bowl XXII)	10–4–1	10–42	1988	8–8
Cincinnati Bengals	1988 (Super Bowl XXIII)	12–4	16–20	1989	8–8
Denver Broncos	1989 (Super Bowl XXIV)	11–5	10–55	1990	5–11
Buffalo Bills	1993 (Super Bowl XXVIII)	12–4	13–30	1994	7–9
Atlanta Falcons	1998 (Super Bowl XXXIII)	14–2	19–34	1999	5–11
New York Giants	2000 (Super Bowl XXXV)	12–4	7–34	2001	7–9
St. Louis Rams	2001 (Super Bowl XXXVI)	14–2	17–20	2002	7–9
Oakland Raiders	2002 (Super Bowl XXXVII)	11–5	21–48	2003	4–12
Carolina Panthers	2003 (Super Bowl XXXVIII)	11–5	29–32	2004	7–9
Philadelphia Eagles	2004 (Super Bowl XXXIX)	13–3	21–24	2005	6–10
Chicago Bears	2006 (Super Bowl XLI)	13–3	17–29	2007	7–9
New England Patriots	2007 (Super Bowl XLII)	16–0	14–17	2008	11–5
Carolina Panthers	2015 (Super Bowl 50)	15–1	10–24	2016	6–10
Los Angeles Rams	2018 (Super Bowl LIII)	13–3	3–13	2019	9–7
San Francisco 49ers	2019 (Super Bowl LIV)	13–3	20–31	2020	6–10
San Francisco 49ers	2023 (Super Bowl LVIII)	12–5	22–25 (OT)	2024	6–11
Kansas City Chiefs	2024 (Super Bowl LIX)	15–2	22–40	2025	6–11

Counter-examples
Team	Super Bowl season	Record	Super Bowl score	Next season	Record	Made playoffs?
Oakland Raiders	1967 (Super Bowl II)	13–1	14–33	1968	12–2	Yes
Minnesota Vikings	1969 (Super Bowl IV)	12–2	7–23	1970	12–2	Yes
Dallas Cowboys	1970 (Super Bowl V)	10–4	13–16	1971	11–3	Yes
Miami Dolphins	1971 (Super Bowl VI)	10–3–1	3–24	1972	14–0	Yes
Washington Redskins	1972 (Super Bowl VII)	11–3	7–14	1973	10–4	Yes
Minnesota Vikings	1973 (Super Bowl VIII)	12–2	7–24	1974	10–4	Yes
Minnesota Vikings	1974 (Super Bowl IX)	10–4	6–16	1975	12–2	Yes
Dallas Cowboys	1975 (Super Bowl X)	10–4	17–21	1976	11–3	Yes
Minnesota Vikings	1976 (Super Bowl XI)	11–2–1	14–32	1977	9–5	Yes
Denver Broncos	1977 (Super Bowl XII)	12–2	10–27	1978	10–6	Yes
Dallas Cowboys	1978 (Super Bowl XIII)	12–4	31–35	1979	11–5	Yes
Los Angeles Rams	1979 (Super Bowl XIV)	9–7	19–31	1980	11–5	Yes
Philadelphia Eagles	1980 (Super Bowl XV)	12–4	10–27	1981	10–6	Yes
Cincinnati Bengals	1981 (Super Bowl XVI)	12–4	21–26	1982	7–2	Yes
Miami Dolphins	1982 (Super Bowl XVII)	7–2	17–27	1983	12–4	Yes
Washington Redskins	1983 (Super Bowl XVIII)	14–2	9–38	1984	11–5	Yes
Miami Dolphins	1984 (Super Bowl XIX)	14–2	16–38	1985	12–4	Yes
New England Patriots	1985 (Super Bowl XX)	11–5	10–46	1986	11–5	Yes
Denver Broncos	1986 (Super Bowl XXI)	11–5	20–39	1987	10–4–1	Yes
Buffalo Bills	1990 (Super Bowl XXV)	13–3	19–20	1991	13–3	Yes
Buffalo Bills	1991 (Super Bowl XXVI)	13–3	24–37	1992	11–5	Yes
Buffalo Bills	1992 (Super Bowl XXVII)	11–5	17–52	1993	12–4	Yes
San Diego Chargers	1994 (Super Bowl XXIX)	11–5	26–49	1995	9–7	Yes
Pittsburgh Steelers	1995 (Super Bowl XXX)	11–5	17–27	1996	10–6	Yes
New England Patriots	1996 (Super Bowl XXXI)	11–5	21–35	1997	10–6	Yes
Green Bay Packers	1997 (Super Bowl XXXII)	13–3	24–31	1998	11–5	Yes
Tennessee Titans	1999 (Super Bowl XXXIV)	13–3	16–23	2000	13–3	Yes
Seattle Seahawks	2005 (Super Bowl XL)	13–3	10–21	2006	9–7	Yes
Arizona Cardinals	2008 (Super Bowl XLIII)	9–7	23–27	2009	10–6	Yes
Indianapolis Colts	2009 (Super Bowl XLIV)	14–2	17–31	2010	10–6	Yes
Pittsburgh Steelers	2010 (Super Bowl XLV)	12–4	25–31	2011	12–4	Yes
New England Patriots	2011 (Super Bowl XLVI)	13–3	17–21	2012	12–4	Yes
San Francisco 49ers	2012 (Super Bowl XLVII)	11–4–1	31–34	2013	12–4	Yes
Denver Broncos	2013 (Super Bowl XLVIII)	13–3	8–43	2014	12–4	Yes
Seattle Seahawks	2014 (Super Bowl XLIX)	12–4	24–28	2015	10–6	Yes
Atlanta Falcons	2016 (Super Bowl LI)	11–5	28–34 (OT)	2017	10–6	Yes
New England Patriots	2017 (Super Bowl LII)	13–3	33–41	2018	11–5	Yes
Kansas City Chiefs	2020 (Super Bowl LV)	14–2	9–31	2021	12–5	Yes
Cincinnati Bengals	2021 (Super Bowl LVI)	10–7	20–23	2022	12–4	Yes
Philadelphia Eagles	2022 (Super Bowl LVII)	14–3	38–35	2023	11–6	Yes
