= Douglas Clarke =

Douglas Clarke can refer to:

- Douglas Clarke (conductor) (1893–1962), British conductor
- Douglas Clarke (New Zealand cricketer) (1932–2005), New Zealand cricketer
- Doug Clarke (English footballer) (1934–2019), English footballer
- Doug Clarke (Australian footballer) (born 1938), Australian rules footballer
- Douglas Clarke (English cricketer) (born 1948), English cricketer

== See also ==
- Douglas Clark (disambiguation)
