= Douglas Ferguson =

Douglas Ferguson may refer to:

- Doug Ferguson (musician), British musician, bass guitarist in Camel
- Doug Ferguson (politician), president of the Liberal Party of Canada, 2008–2009
- Doug Ferguson (ice hockey) (born 1943), Canadian ice hockey player
- Doug Ferguson (Fair City), a character in soap opera Fair City
- Douglas Ferguson (artist) (born 1951), New York-based artist and fashion designer
- Douglas Ferguson, American poet, member of M'bwebwe
- J. Douglas Ferguson, Canadian numismatist, ANA President 1941–43, whose collection is now in the Currency Museum
- Duggie Ferguson, fictional character in the soap opera Coronation Street
