= Doug Harris =

Doug or Douglas Harris may refer to:

- Doug Harris (athlete) (1919–1996), New Zealand runner
- Doug Harris (cricketer) (born 1962), Australian cricketer
- Doug Harris (Neighbours), a fictional character on Australian soap opera Neighbours
- Douglas Harris (field hockey) (born 1966), Canadian former field hockey player
- Douglas N. Harris, American economist

== See also ==
- Douglas Emhoff (born 1964), American attorney, second gentleman of the United States, spouse of Kamala Harris
