= Flip Men =

2011–2012 American reality TV series

- Genre: Reality
- Starring: Mike Baird; Doug Clark
- Theme music composer: Jeff Lippencott; Mark T. Williams
- Country of origin: United States
- Original language: English
- No. of seasons: 2
- No. of episodes: 22

Production
- Executive producer: Dave Broome
- Camera setup: Panasonic AJ-HDX900
- Production company: 25/7 Productions

Original release
- Network: Spike
- Release: October 25, 2011 – September 23, 2012

Flip Men is an American reality television series starring Mike Baird and Doug Clark that premiered on Spike on October 25, 2011, and ran for two seasons. The series follows Baird and Clark as they purchase foreclosed houses at auction, remodel the homes and sell them for return profits.

== History ==
A neighbor introduced Clark to producer Danny Thompson, who helped Clark and Baird make videos about their endeavors as professional house flippers, in an online series titled Foreclosure Boys. They created approximately 90 videos over an 18-month period, which led to an introduction to Dave Broome (creator of The Biggest Loser), who would go on to create and executive produce Flip Men. At the time, there was an excess of foreclosed houses on the market, following the 2008 financial crisis.

Flip Men premiered on Spike on October 25, 2011. It was picked up for a second season on January 31, 2012, with the season two premiere airing on August 5, 2012. The final episode aired in the US on September 23, 2012. On January 10, 2012, Electus announced that it had secured the series to be broadcast internationally. The series first aired in Australia on One in October 2012. On January 7, 2014, the series started airing on Dave in the UK.

== Overview ==
Shot on location in and around Salt Lake City, Utah, the unscripted half-hour series follows Clark and Baird as they purchase foreclosed houses at bidding auctions and quickly fix them up to get them back on the market and turn a profit. They also renovate and hold some houses, waiting for the value to go up further. They have no legal right to enter a house until they win the house at auction. When entering a house for the first time, they often have to kick the door down, since the houses don't come with keys. Items Clark and Baird have found inside the homes include thousands of bees, wedding dresses, vehicles and television sets, as well as a house that was formerly a meth lab. They are able to make quick purchasing decisions based in large part on their understanding of specific neighborhoods and their values. When a foreclosed house doesn't sell at auction, it is almost always subject to bank repossession, widely considered to be a negative result because banks are typically slower at turning around a foreclosed property.

== Hosts ==
Clark and Baird have contrasting personalities, with Clark more spontaneous and impulsive, while Baird is more careful and analytical. They often disagree over the risk involved in various properties. Prior to Flip Men, they bought and sold an estimated 750 houses in the Salt Lake City area.

=== Doug Clark ===
Clark was born and raised in Murray, Utah. After graduating from the University of Utah with a degree in economics and science, he became a commercial airline pilot for SkyWest Airlines. As a pilot, he found himself with a lot of free time, and became interested in learning more about the real estate business. After meeting Baird at a real estate auction, they formed Equity Capital Group in 2005. Clark continued to work as a pilot part-time until 2011, when he decided to focus solely on real estate. Since 2005, his companies Equity Capital Group and Clark Venture Capital have purchased nearly $50 million in property. Clark has said that while location is the most important factor in real estate, the most important factor in flipping is price.

=== Mike Baird ===
Baird grew up in San Diego, California, and graduated from Brigham Young University's Marriott School of Management with a BA in business management in 2002. He then began to learn about home maintenance and repair, and started investing in real estate. He is the owner of Baird Investment Properties and Equity Capital Group. Mike is also known for Founding the Smarter Real Estate Tribe and.

== Episodes ==
=== Season 1 ===
No.	Title	Original release date
1	"Meth House"	October 25, 2011
2	"Gang House"	November 1, 2011
3	"Flood House"	November 8, 2011
4	"Mystery House"	November 15, 2011
5	"Masturbation Station"	November 22, 2011
6	"Suicide"	November 29, 2011
7	"Bombs Away"	December 6, 2011
8	"Sinking Home"	December 6, 2011
9	"Maggot House"	December 13, 2011
10	"Mike Fights Doug"	December 13, 2011
11	"Death Trap"	January 3, 2012
12	"Million Dollar Money Pit"	January 10, 2012

=== Season 2 ===
No.	Title	Original release date
1	"Jacked By Thieves"	August 5, 2012
2	"Drive Through Meth Lab"	August 5, 2012
3	"Bee House"	August 12, 2012
4	"Hoarder House"	August 12, 2012
5	"The Stench"	August 19, 2012
6	"Polygamist House"	August 26, 2012
7	"Bloody Crime Scene"	September 9, 2012
8	"The Bet"	September 16, 2012
9	"Doug Vs. The Building Inspector"	September 23, 2012
10	"A Huge Mistake"	September 23, 2012
