= Doug Davies =

Doug Davies may refer to:

- Doug Davies (Australian footballer) (1930–1991), former Australian rules footballer
- Doug Davies (Canadian football) (born 1964), former Canadian football offensive lineman
- Doug Davies (rugby union) (1899–1987), Scottish international rugby union player
- Douglas Davies (born 1947), theologian
- Douglas Davies (cricketer) (1881–1949), South African cricketer
- Douglas Arthur Davies (1896–1992), British Royal Air Force officer
- Doug Davies (speedway rider) (born 1936), South African speedway rider

== See also ==
- Douglas Davis (disambiguation)
