= "A" Device =

Award device of the United States military

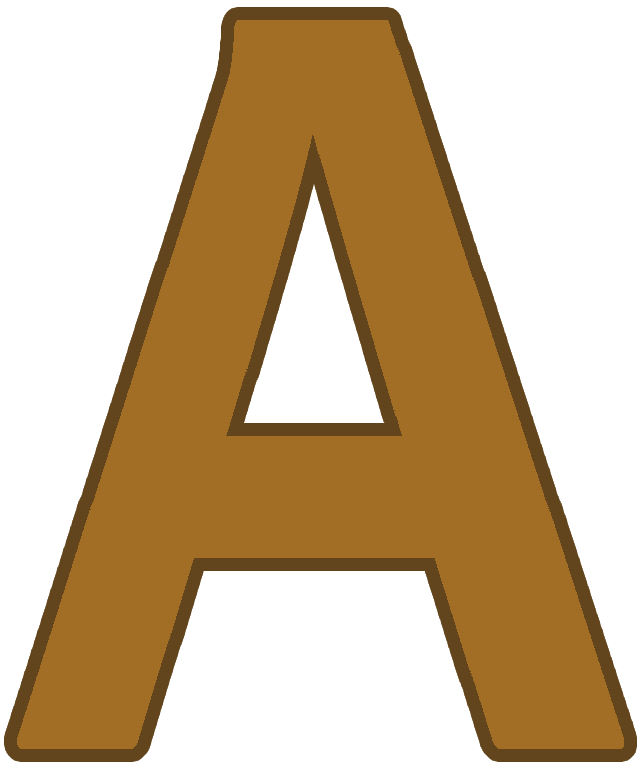
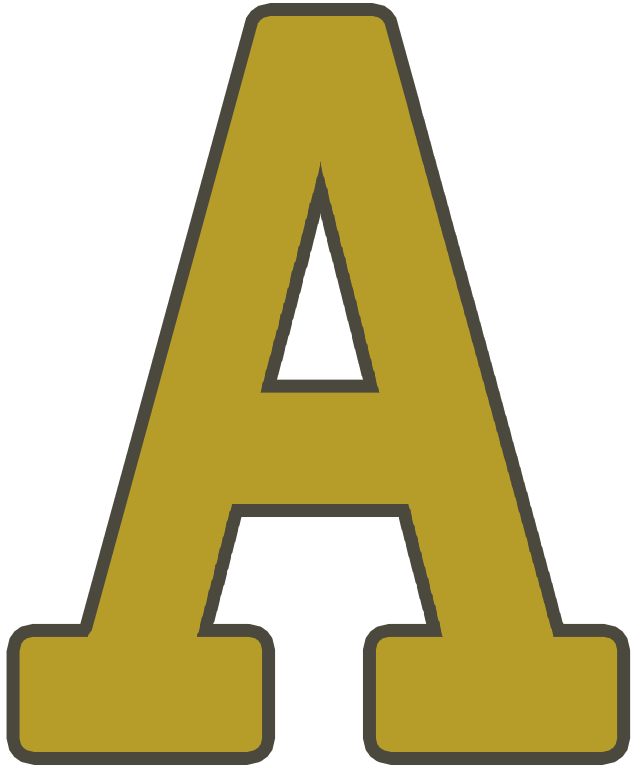
- Left Atlantic Device, Right Arctic Device
- Type: Ribbon Device
- Awarded for: (Atlantic) WWII service in the Atlantic area on the American Defense Service Medal (Arctic) USAF Arctic service on the Air Force Overseas Ribbon - Short Tour
- Sponsored by: (Atlantic) War Department (Arctic) United States Air Force
- Status: (Atlantic) No Longer Awarded (Arctic) Currently Awarded (USAF)
- Established: (Atlantic) June 1941 (Arctic) February 2002

The "A" Device is a miniature bronze 1/4 inch letter "A" which comes with and without serifs, that is authorized for wear by the United States Armed Forces as a medal and ribbon device for two military awards. It is added to overseas service ribbons to indicate the theatre of action.

The Arctic "A" Device (with serifs), if authorized, may be attached to the center of the Air Force Overseas Ribbon - Short Tour, for service beginning February 10, 2002. If an oak leaf cluster is also authorized for wear on the ribbon, the "A" device is worn to the wearer's right of any oak leaf clusters on the ribbon.

The Atlantic "A" Device (without serifs), if authorized, may be attached to the center of the suspension and service ribbon of the American Defense Service Medal for service from June 22 to December 7, 1941. The "A" device is worn in lieu of any authorized 3/16 inch bronze star that is worn on the medal and service ribbon.

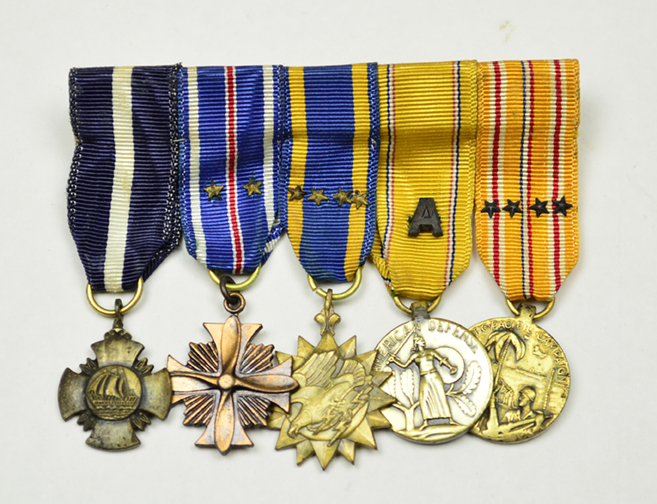
Medals awarded to Douglas Alan Clark (US Navy); the American Defense Service Medal is second from right, with an "A" Device, indicating belligerent contact with Axis powers in the Atlantic Ocean between June 22 and December 7, 1941.

== History ==
The "A" Device is only authorized for the currently in use Air Force Overseas Ribbon - Short Tour, and the American Defense Service Medal which is no longer in use. The two representations of the "A" device are different. The Arctic Device has serifs while the Atlantic Device ("Axis Device") does not have "feet" (sans-serif).

=== Atlantic Device (World War II) ===
The American Defense Service Medal was the first military award to use the "A" device which was named the "Atlantic Device" (sometimes was referred to as the "Axis Device"). The "A" device was authorized for wear (in lieu of a 3/16 inch bronze star that was worn in lieu of a service clasp on the award) on the medal and service ribbon by any member of the United States Navy, United States Marine Corps, or United States Coast Guard who served on certain vessels in the Atlantic Ocean between June 22 and December 7, 1941 which engaged in armed conflict, or potential armed conflict, with Axis forces in the Atlantic (naval forces of Nazi Germany's Kriegsmarine). Such personnel were awarded the American Defense Service Medal with the "Atlantic Device" (Atlantic Fleet service), the intent being to recognize those who had participated in the "undeclared war" when the U.S. was assisting Britain with war convoys and German U-boat interdiction.

=== Arctic Device (USAF) ===
Air Force Overseas Service Ribbon (Short Tour) with Arctic Device

The "A" device became obsolete after the Second World War and did not appear again until the year 2002 (authorized on February 10, 2002). At that time, the United States Air Force declared that the "A" device, now known as the "Arctic Device", would be authorized for wear for those who had received the Air Force Overseas Ribbon - Short Tour, for tours of duty north of the Arctic Circle.

As of February 8, 2007, only those airmen and guardians who were assigned to Pituffik Space Base (north-west Greenland) qualify for the "A" (Arctic) device. Although portions of Alaska are within the Arctic Circle, there are no American military bases within that region. The "A" is worn on the center of the ribbon except when worn with oak leaf clusters. Whenever oak leaf clusters are authorized for wear on the ribbon, the "A" is placed to the wearer's right of the oak leaf clusters on the ribbon. Only one "A" device may be worn on the ribbon.

== See also ==
- Coast Guard Arctic Service Medal
- United States military award devices
