= American Defense Service Medal =

Military award of the United States

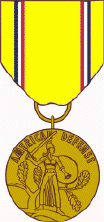
- Obverse
- Type: Military medal Service medal
- Awarded for: Service between 8 September 1939 and 7 December 1941
- Presented by: Department of War and Department of the Navy
- Eligibility: Military personnel only
- Status: Inactive
- Established: Executive Order 8808, June 28, 1941
- First award: September 8, 1939 (retroactive)
- Final award: December 7, 1941 (retroactive)

Highlights
- Total recipients: about 2,000,000
- Service ribbon and Streamer

Precedence
- Next (higher): Army: Army of Occupation of Germany Medal; Air Force: Air and Space Recognition Ribbon; Navy, Marine Corps, Coast Guard: China Service Medal
- Next (lower): Army – Women's Army Corps Service Medal; Navy & Marine Corps – American Campaign Medal; Air Force – American Campaign Medal

The American Defense Service Medal was a military award of the United States Armed Forces, established by Executive Order 8808, by President Franklin D. Roosevelt, on June 28, 1941. The medal was intended to recognize those military service members who had served on active duty between September 8, 1939, and December 7, 1941.

A similar medal, known as the American Campaign Medal, was established in 1942, for service in the American Theater during the World War II era.

== History ==
The American Defense Service Medal was established by Executive Order 8808, on 28 June 1941, by President Franklin D. Roosevelt and announced in War Department Bulletin 17, 1941. The criteria for the medal was announced in War Department Circular 44, on 13 February 1942. The service ribbon design was approved by the Secretary of War and the Secretary of the Navy on January 7, 1942. The medal was designed by Mr. Lee Lawrie, a civilian sculptor from Easton, Maryland. The model was approved by the Commission of Fine Arts on May 5, 1942.

== Criteria ==
The medal is authorized to military members who served on active duty between President Roosevelt's declaration of a limited national emergency on September 8, 1939, and the attack on Pearl Harbor on December 7, 1941. Members of the United States Army, to include those in the Organized Reserve and National Guard, received this medal for any length of service during the eligibility period, provided that they were on orders to active duty for a period of twelve months or longer. The United States Navy excluded those reservists who were on active duty for less than ten days during the eligibility period, but otherwise the Navy, United States Marine Corps, and United States Coast Guard awarded the medal to all personnel who served on active duty at any time during the eligibility period, Regular or Reservist, provided they passed their initial physical examinations, such as in the case of those Reservists called back to extended active duty prior to the December 7, 1941, attack on Pearl Harbor, or enlisted recruits or officer candidates who entered the Navy or Marine Corps during the same period.

== Appearance ==
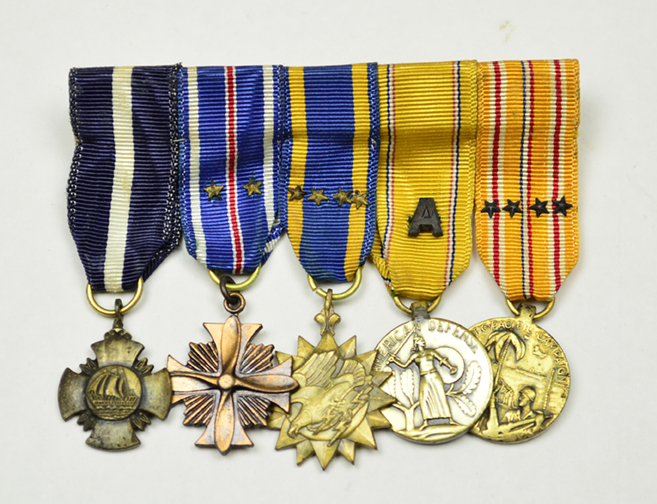
Medals awarded to Douglas Alan Clark; the American Defense Service Medal is second from right, with an "A" Device, indicating belligerent contact with Axis Powers in the Atlantic Ocean between June 22 and December 7, 1941.

The bronze medal is 1 1/4 inches (32 mm) in diameter. On the obverse is a female Grecian figure symbolic of defense, holding in her sinister hand an ancient war shield in reverse and her dexter hand brandishing a sword above her head, and standing upon a conventionalized oak branch with four leaves. Around the top is the lettering "AMERICAN DEFENSE". The reverse is the wording "FOR SERVICE DURING THE LIMITED EMERGENCY PROCLAIMED BY THE PRESIDENT ON SEPTEMBER 8, 1939 OR DURING THE UNLIMITED EMERGENCY PROCLAIMED BY THE PRESIDENT ON MAY 27, 1941" above a seven-leafed spray of laurel.

The suspension and service ribbon of the medal is 1 3/8 inches (35 mm) wide and consists of the following stripes: 3/16 in (4.8 mm) Golden Yellow 67104; 1/8 in (3.2 mm) triparted Old Glory Blue 67178; White 67101; and Scarlet 67111; center 3/4 in (19 mm) Golden Yellow; 1/8 in (3.2 mm) triparted Scarlet; White; and Old Glory Blue 67178; and 3/16 in (4.8 mm) Golden yellow. The golden yellow color was symbolic of the golden opportunity of the youth of the United States to serve the National colors, represented by the blue, white and red pin stripes on each side.

== Devices ==
The American Defense Service Medal was authorized with the following devices:

- Foreign Service Clasp: Issued by the United States Army for military service outside the continental limits of the United States, including service in Alaska. The foreign service clasp is a bronze bar 1/8 inch (3.2 mm) in width and 1 1/2 in (38 mm) in length with the words FOREIGN SERVICE, with a star at each end of the inscription.
- Base Clasp: Issued by the U.S. Navy and United States Marine Corps for service outside the continental limits of the United States (service in either Alaska or Hawaii qualified).
- Fleet Clasp: Issued by the Navy, Marine Corps and United States Coast Guard for service on the high seas while regularly attached to any vessels of the Atlantic, Pacific, or Asiatic fleets as well as vessels of the Naval Transport Service and vessels operating directly under the Chief of Naval Operations. The Fleet clasp is a bronze bar 1/8 inch (3.2 mm) in width and 1 1/2 in (38 mm) in length with the words FLEET inscribed.
- Sea Clasp: Issued by the Coast Guard for all other vessels and aircraft, not qualifying for the Fleet Clasp, which regularly conducted patrols at sea.
- "A" Device: Awarded to any member of the Navy who served duty in actual or potential belligerent contact with Axis powers in the Atlantic Ocean between June 22 and December 7, 1941. The "A" Device was also worn on the medal's uniform ribbon.
- Service star: Worn in lieu of clasps when wearing the American Defense Service Medal as a ribbon on a military uniform.

== See also ==
- Code of Federal Regulations
- National Defense Service Medal

== Bibliography ==
- Foster, Frank C. (2002). A complete guide to all United States military medals, 1939 to present. Fountain Inn, S.C.: MOA Press. ISBN 978-1-884-45218-5. OCLC 54755134.
- Kerrigan, Evans E. (1971). American war medals and decorations. New York: Viking Press. ISBN 978-0-670-12101-4. OCLC 128058.
- Kerrigan, Evans E. (1990). American medals and decorations. Noroton Heights, CT: Medallic. ISBN 978-0-792-45082-5. OCLC 21467942.
- Robles, Philip K. (1971). United States military medals and ribbons. Rutland, VT: C. E. Tuttle. ISBN 978-0-804-80048-8. OCLC 199721.
