= Doug Williams =

Doug or Douglas Williams is the name of:

== People ==
=== Sports ===
- Doug Williams (quarterback) (born 1955), American football quarterback, coach, and executive
- Doug Williams (offensive lineman) (born 1962), American football offensive lineman
- Doug Williams (Australian footballer) (1923–2014), Australian rules footballer
- Douglas Williams (cricketer) (1919–?), Australian cricketer
- Doug Williams (wrestler) (born 1972), English professional wrestler

=== Other people ===
- Doug Williams (bassist) (born 1969), American bassist for the bands Origin and Cephalic Carnage
- Doug Williams (comedian) (born 1969), American comedian
- Doug Williams (musician) (born 1956), American gospel musician
- Doug Williams (polygraph critic) (1945–2021), American critic of polygraph tests
- Douglas Paul Williams (1955–2003), perpetrator of the Lockheed Martin shooting
- Douglas Williams (sound engineer) (1917–1993), American sound engineer
- Douglas Williams (clarinetist), (flourished 1917-1930), American clarinetist

== Characters ==
- Doug Williams (Days of Our Lives), on the soap opera Days of Our Lives, played by Bill Hayes
