= Doug Lewis =

Doug or Douglas Lewis may refer to:

- Doug Lewis (politician) (born 1938), former Canadian politician
- Doug Lewis (ice hockey) (1921–1994), Canadian ice hockey player
- Doug Lewis (skier) (born 1964), American alpine ski racer
- R. Doug Lewis, Executive Director of the Election Center
- Douglas Lewis (boxer) (1898–1981), Canadian boxer
- Douglas Lewis (art historian) (born 1938), American art historian
