= Douglas Lewis (art historian) =

American art historian

Douglas Lewis (born Charles Douglas Lewis; April 30, 1938) is an American art historian and architectural historian. His specialties include the architecture of Andrea Palladio, Renaissance plaquettes, and European sculpture. From 1968 to 2004 he was curator of sculpture at the National Gallery of Art in Washington, D.C.

== Early life and education ==
Born at Beech Grove, a Landmark property in southwestern Mississippi held in his family since 1803, Lewis spent his early years between Washington, D.C. and Nevada, as the Second World War took his father, a naval ordnance officer (USNA, Annapolis, Class of 1934), far from home. Not yet three years old, he visited the National Gallery on its opening day with his mother, Beatrice Fenwick (Stewart) Lewis. After the war, the family returned to Mississippi, where Lewis spent his middle school years, transferring to The Lawrenceville School near Princeton for high school.

Lewis earned bachelor's degrees in European history and history of art from Yale University and then, on a Mellon Fellowship, another Bachelor's with First-Class Honours and a master's in fine arts from Clare College, Cambridge. At both institutions he was an accomplished oarsman. He returned to the US for a master's and Ph.D. from Yale, which included three years in Italy as a Rome Prize Fellow. His dissertation on the late baroque churches of Venice (later published by Garland Press) was completed in 1967.

== Career ==
The next year Lewis began his long tenure as curator of sculpture at the National Gallery. Among his early duties was co-administering the NGA's prestigious fellowship program that selected many future stars of the art-historical firmament including Kirk Varnedoe, Timothy Verdon, Arthur Wheelock, Peter Fusco, Joseph Connors, Alison Luchs, Bruce Boucher, Otto Naumann, Anne Wagner, Gary Radke, Anne Poulet, Larry Silver, George Shackelford, Franklin Kelly, and Patricia Mainardi. In 1969 he married the architectural historian Carolyn Kolb. In these early years, prior to the advent of a dedicated design and installation department, Lewis served as curator-in-charge for several in-house exhibitions, including one on African sculpture and another on American Eskimo and Indian art, in which he identified a group of portrait masks from the Haida culture as the work of a single master.

His interest in architecture — Palladian in particular — did not wane in this period, as he joined the board of the Centro internazionale di studi di architettura Andrea Palladio in 1974. His work establishing the date of 1551–1553 for the Villa Cornaro at Piombino Dese appeared in contemporary scholarly essays but its definitive study is an unpublished book-length manuscript deposited with CISA. He also published extensively on the Villa Barbaro at Maser, assigning both the architecture and internal frescoed frameworks to Palladio, its sculpture cycle to the younger Barbaro brother, and the intricate iconographic program to the elder Barbaro. In 1981, Lewis selected an exhibition called The Drawings of Andrea Palladio, for which his catalogue (later expanded and republished) remains the only extended treatment of the subject in English.

In seeking acquisitions for the National Gallery, Lewis sought to expand the collection beyond the Italian Renaissance and Neo-Classicism, the focus of the earliest donations to the Gallery. He helped bring in works from Girardon to Foggini, St. Gaudens to Maillol to Henry Moore. He also enhanced the core collection with an exquisite relief which he identified as Antonio Lombardo’s Peace Establishing Her Reign for Alfonso d’Este’s Camerino d’Alabastro, and found and secured the acquisition of Jean-Baptiste Lemoyne’s c. 1757 bust of Baron du Bourg.

As the 21st century approached, Lewis remained a prolific writer, contributing to numerous periodicals and collection catalogues, as well as the Macmillan Encyclopedia of Architects and the Grove Dictionary of Art. He developed a deep and abiding interest in Renaissance plaquettes, small sculptural reliefs in metal which, like prints, served to disseminate antique and avant-garde compositions and motifs. His systematic catalogue of the National Gallery’s collection of plaquettes, running to more than 1,500 pages, remains unpublished, but is available for consultation on-site.

Lewis periodically took leaves of absence from the National Gallery to teach as an adjunct or lecturer at Bryn Mawr, Berkeley, Johns Hopkins, Georgetown, and the University of Maryland. At the last, he was recognized in 2001 as "Best Teacher on Campus." He also served for 26 years on the US Postal Service Citizens’ Stamp Advisory Committee, responsible for national philatelic design. Among his last contributions at the National Gallery was collaborating on a reinstallation of the sculpture collection in the West Building, and helping design a study and seminar room used for close inspection of works of sculpture.

In retirement in Mississippi, he has served on the boards of several historic and cultural institutions, undertaken a restoration of Beech Grove, and continued to publish widely. He is a Lay Reader in his 1823 Anglican parish.

== Selected publications ==
- Late Baroque Churches of Venice. New York and London: Garland 1979.
- The Drawings of Andrea Palladio. Washington, D.C.: International Exhibitions Foundation: 1981, revised and expanded ed., New Orleans: Martin & St. Martin, 2000.
- The Far North : 2000 years of American Eskimo and Indian art. Washington: National Gallery of Art. 1973. Reissued by Indiana University Press, 1977 (compiler and coordinator)
- Renaissance Small Bronze Sculpture and Associated Decorative Arts at the National Gallery of Art. Washington, D.C.: National Gallery of Art, 1983. (contributor)
- Essays in Art and Architecture in Memory of Carolyn Kolb. Vienna and Cracow: Artibus et Historiae No. 35, 1997. (editor and contributor)

== General references ==
- "Lewis, Douglas". Dictionary of Art Historians.

=== Sources ===
As of this edit, this article uses content from "Lewis, Douglas", authored by Dictionary of Art Historians, which is licensed in a way that permits reuse under the Creative Commons Attribution-ShareAlike 4.0 International License, but not under the GFDL. All relevant terms must be followed.
