= Larry Douglas =

Larry or Lawrence Douglas may refer to:

- Larry Douglas (American football) (born 1957; Larry "Juice" Douglas), American football player
- Larry Douglas (baseball) (1890–1949), Major League Baseball pitcher
- Lawrence Douglas (born 1959; Lawrence R. Douglas), American lawyer

== See also ==
- Doug Lawrence (disambiguation)
