= Doug Clark (investor) =

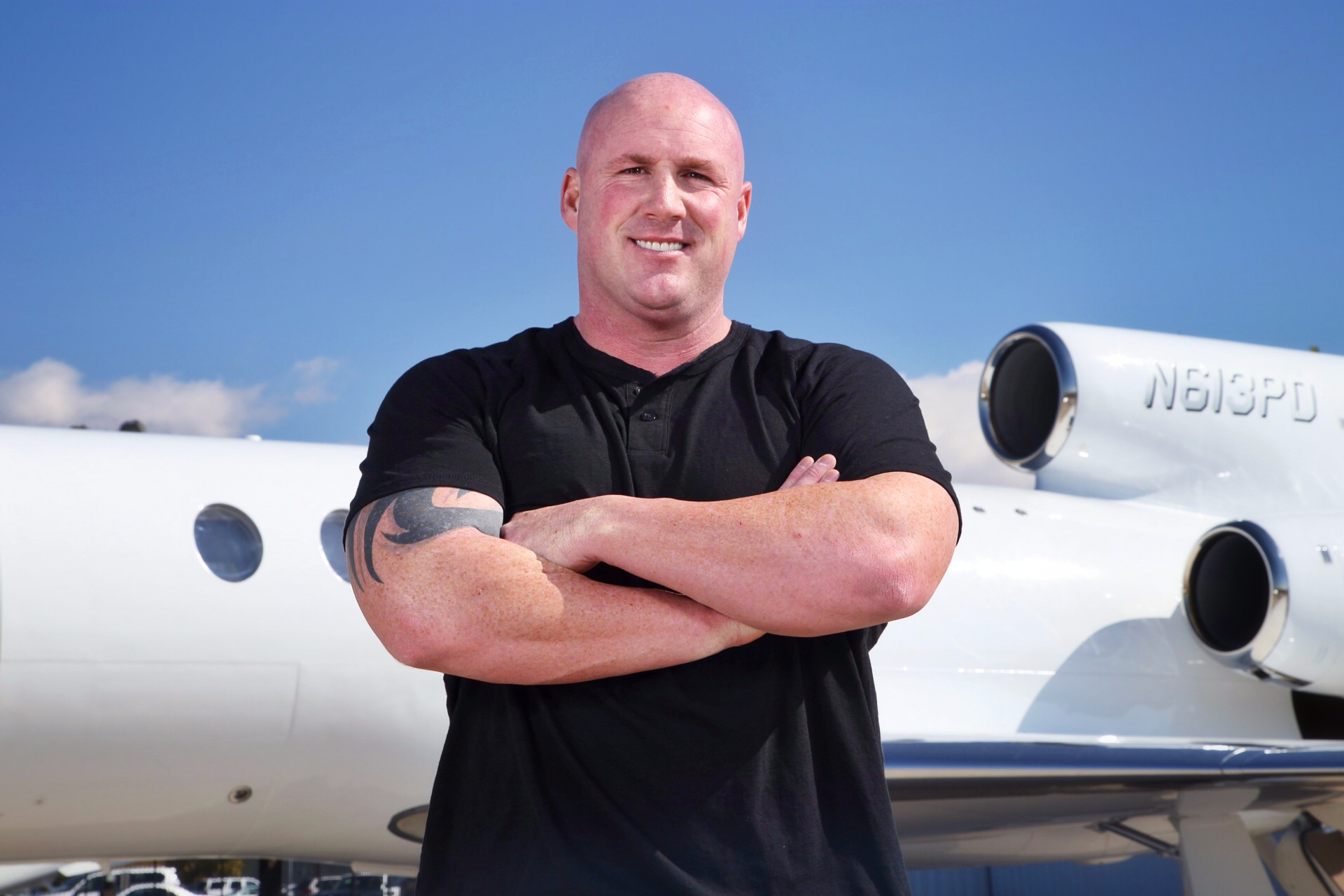
- Clark in 2016
- Education: University of Utah
- Occupations: TV personality, real estate investor, house flipper
- Website: www.dougclarkevents.com

Doug Clark is an American real estate investor and TV personality. Before getting into real estate, Doug worked as an airline pilot.

Between 2011 and 2012, he was featured on the Spike TV reality television series Flip Men alongside co-host Mike Baird.

== Biography ==
=== Early life and pilot career ===
Doug Clark was raised in Murray, Utah and went to college at the University of Utah. In 1997, he received a bachelor's degree in economics Magna Cum Laude, and became an airline pilot for Colgan Air, eventually promoted to a first officer. In 2004, he became a captain for SkyWest Airlines. On his days off, he developed an interest in real estate investment. He bought his first home at an auction, and resold it within three days. Clark continued to work as an airline pilot until 2011.

=== Real estate ===
Clark met with Mike Baird in 2004 to learn how to enter the property flipping industry, and shadowed Baird until 2005 when they formed Equity Capital Group and Clark Venture Capital. The companies financed their real estate activities of buying, renovating, and then reselling homes purchased at auction.

By late 2011, Clark had bought and sold 750 houses over five years in the Salt Lake City area, and by 2012, he had bought and sold one thousand. Clark has said that he only buys a small fraction of the homes he researches when looking for properties to invest in, and that the purchase price is the most important thing he looks at when making a decision on an investment. He also been interviewed by the media regarding the best methods of house flipping and the differences between varying markets for property investments. He has also toured US home shows to promote his business and has been interviewed about the logistics of purchasing homes at auction in regard to his television series.

=== Reality television ===
In 2009, Clark and Baird began working with television producer Danny Thompson, co-creating a web series called Foreclosure Boys. The series involved the creation of about 90 YouTube videos per year about their business and different projects they would encounter. After David Broome noticed the videos, he approached Clark and Baird about developing a reality television series surrounding their business.

In 2011, Clark and Baird began producing and starring in the reality television series Flip Men on Spike TV, which focused on the restoring of houses abandoned during the housing crash—in particular, the more extreme cases of property degradation in comparison to the rehabbed result are shown. The show debuted on October 25, 2011, featuring properties in Salt Lake City. The series was renewed for a second season in 2012, which received an audience of about one million viewers per episode and three million per week including reruns. The program featured both smaller properties as well as large unkept mansions.

== Legal problems ==
In late 2019, the FTC sought to shut down "Response Marketing" firm, the Utah-based real estate investment training firm promoted by Clark. On March 22, 2024, the FTC announced it would begin issuing $16.7 million in refunds to thousands of customers defrauded by Response Marketing. Doug Clark was cited as instrumental in the promotion of the fraudulent scheme, which defrauded thousands of customers who bought into the celebrity real estate training scheme. In 2024, the Federal Trade Commission began issuing $16.7 million in refunds to customers of Response Marketing, whose free seminars were advertised by real estate television personalities including Clark.

== Seminars and events ==
After production of Spike TV's Flip Men was halted in late 2012, Clark began a USA hosting real estate seminars. Clark's teaching platform focuses on three main points: becoming a successful landlord, fixing and flipping homes, and using financing to flip wholesale properties.
