= Doug Lawrence =

Doug Lawrence or Douglas Lawrence, may refer to:

- Mr. Lawrence (born 1969; Douglas Lawrence Osowski), American voice actor and writer
- Doug Lawrence (jazz musician) (born 1956), American saxophonist
- Douglas Lawrence (born 1943; Raymond Douglas Lawrence), Australian organist

== See also ==
- Lawrence Douglas (disambiguation)
