= Douglas E. Wright =

Douglas Edward Wright (born 1955 in Goose Bay, Labrador) is a Canadian supernatural suspense / dark fantasy writer of horror fiction who now resides in Victoria, British Columbia, Canada.

Douglas grew up in Labrador, Saskatchewan and Ontario. He started school in Moose Jaw, Saskatchewan, and continued in CFB Borden and Prescott, Ontario. Having been married once, he has two children, one adopted, Della and his own daughter, Stephanie.

After having worked for Canada Post in several Ontario towns, he moved to Iqaluit, Nunavut, Springdale, Newfoundland, Victoria, Duncan, British Columbia, and Whitehorse, Yukon. In 2010, after moving back to Victoria, he retired from Canada Post.

His stories have been or will be published in: Britain's Horror Express Magazine, HUB and Thirteen Magazine: USA's Black Ink Horror Magazine, Escaping Elsewhere, Mount Zion Press, Chainsaw Magazine, and in the anthologies 'Raw Meat' by CWW Press, the HELP anthology by the Preditors and Editors website and Larry Sells' 'Enter the Realm.'

== Published works ==
- Vampyre's Quest – Papercut Publishing – 2011/12 – Anthology
- Gristle & Bone – Black Ink Horror – Issue 7 – 2010/11
- Nickels – Seventh Star Press – 2010 – Anthology
- Boogaloos – SideShow Press – 2009 – Novella
- Sweet Things – SideShow Press – 2009 – Chapbook
- Prairie Santa – Black Ink Horror – 2009 – Issue 5
- Crimson Hearts – The Help Anthology – 2008
- Uncommitted – Sideshow Press – Sideshow Press – 2007
- Grannies – Black Ink Horror – October 2007 – Issue 3
- Hunger – Escaping Elsewhere Magazine – 2007
- Scrapyard Dawn – Mount Zion Speculative Fiction Review – 2007
- Relative Misery – Black Ink Horror – 2007 – Issue 2
- ROH! – Hub Magazine – Issue 2 – Feb. 2007
- Hofferdog – Escaping Elsewhere # 3 – May – 2006
- The Storyteller – Chainsaw Magazine – February – 2006
- The Glass Cross – Horror Express # 5 – 2005
- Breathing in the Past – SideShow Press – Wicked Karnival – Halloween Edition – 2005
- Terror Time – Thirteen Magazine – February 2005
- Cassandra's Playground – Thirteen Magazine – January – 2005
- Crimson Hearts – Horror Express # 4 – 2005
- Ice Maidens of Rattling Brooke – Horror Express # 3 – 2004
- Soul Mates – Larry Sells Publishing – 2004
- Douglas is also one of the Submissions Editors for Dark Discoveries Magazine.
