= Douglas N. Harris =

American economist and education policy researcher

- Occupation: Economist
- Employer: Tulane University
- Title: Professor and Chair, Department of Economics; Schlieder Foundation Chair in Public Education

Academic background
- Education: Ph.D. in Economics, Michigan State University (2000)

Douglas N. Harris is an American economist. He is Professor and Chair of the Department of Economics and the Schlieder Foundation Chair in Public Education at Tulane University. He is also a non-resident Senior Fellow at the Brookings Institution.

== Career ==
Harris joined Tulane University as Associate Professor in 2012 and became full Professor of Economics in 2015. He assumed the role of department chair in 2019 and has held the Schlieder Foundation Chair in Public Education since 2012. He founded ERA–New Orleans in 2013 and REACH in 2018. He has been a non-resident Senior Fellow at the Brookings Institution since 2016.

Before joining Tulane, Harris held academic appointments at the University of Wisconsin–Madison (2009–2012) and Florida State University (2002–2007), and was an education economist at the Economic Policy Institute (2001–2002). He earned his Ph.D. in economics from Michigan State University in 2000.

== Research ==
Harris's work focuses on school accountability, teacher labor markets, charter schools, and higher education access. His New Orleans research on school choice led to the creation of the REACH center, which focuses on school choice policies nationally, including charter schools, public school choice, homeschooling, and vouchers.

He has also conducted two long-term randomized control trials on college financial aid and “free college” programs. The Wisconsin Scholars Longitudinal Study (with Sara Goldrick-Rab) examined students who had already started college before the aid. The Milwaukee Degree Project analyzed the long-term effects of aid commitments when students started high school. Both studies found limited effects on student outcomes compared with prior studies that did not include random assignment.

== Policy engagement and public impact ==
Harris edits the Live Handbook of Education Policy Research, a digital reference published by the Association for Education Finance and Policy.

He has advised governors in several states, the United States Department of Education, and the Obama and Biden transition teams, and has testified before the U.S. Senate's Health, Education, Labor, and Pensions Committee. He contributes occasional commentary to the Brookings Brown Center.

His research has been cited by major national media outlets, including The New York Times, The Washington Post, The Wall Street Journal, NPR, Fox News, and CNN. Education Week listed him among the top 25 U.S. education scholars. The New York Times has quoted his work on topics such as school vouchers, COVID-19 school closures, and education spending.

== Honors and awards ==
- Policy Field Distinguished Contribution Award from the Association for Public Policy Analysis and Management (APPAM) (2025)
- Fellow, American Educational Research Association (AERA) (2018)

== Selected works ==
=== Books ===
- Charter School City: What the End of Traditional Public Schools in New Orleans Means for American Education (University of Chicago Press, 2020)
- Challenging the One Best System: The Portfolio Management Model and Urban School Governance (Harvard Education Press, 2020), co-edited with Katrina Bulkley, Julie Marsh, and Katharine Strunk – winner of the 2022 AERA Outstanding Book Award
- Value-Added Measures in Education (Harvard Education Press, 2011), nominated for the Grawemeyer Award in Education

=== Selected articles ===
- Harris, D. N. (2011). "Value-added measures and the future of educational accountability." Science, 333: 826–827.
- Harris, D. and Sass, T. (2011). "Teacher training, teacher quality, and student achievement." Journal of Public Economics 95: 798–812.
- Goldrick-Rab, S., Kelchen, R., Harris, D. N., & Benson, J. (2016). "Reducing income inequality in educational attainment: Experimental evidence on the impact of financial aid on college completion." American Journal of Sociology, 121(6), 1762–1817.
- Harris, D. N. & Larsen, M. (2023). "Taken by Storm: The Effects of Hurricane Katrina on Medium-Term Student Outcomes in New Orleans." Journal of Human Resources, 58(5), 1608–1643.
- Chen, F. & Harris, D. N. (2023). "The Market-Level Effects of Charter Schools on Student Outcomes: A National Analysis." Journal of Public Economics, 228.
- Harris, D. N. & Mills, J. (2025). "Should College Be Free? Evidence from an Eight-Year Randomized Control Trial." American Economic Journal: Economic Policy, 17(3), 373-406.
