= W. Douglas Smith =

American politician

Member of the South Carolina House of Representatives from the 32nd district
- In office 1992 - 2008

Personal details
- Born: April 3, 1958 (age 68) Spartanburg, South Carolina
- Party: Republican
- Spouse: Alison
- Profession: Attorney

William Douglas "Doug" Smith is a Republican and former member of the South Carolina House of Representatives, representing the 32nd District since 1992, and serving as the Speaker Pro Tempore from 2000 until retirement in 2008.
