= Doug Clarke (Australian footballer) =

Australian rules footballer

Personal information
- Full name: Doug Clarke
- Born: 11 May 1938
- Original team: Liverpool (NSW)
- Height: 188 cm (6 ft 2 in)
- Weight: 80 kg (176 lb)

Playing career^{1}
Years	Club	Games (Goals)
1958–59	Richmond	8 (7)
- ^{1} Playing statistics correct to the end of 1959.

Doug Clarke (born 11 May 1938) is a former Australian rules footballer who played with Richmond in the Victorian Football League (VFL).
