= Douglas Williams (clarinetist) =

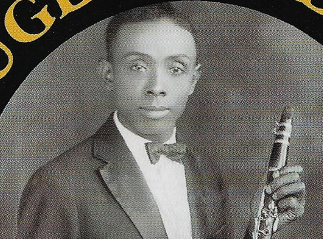
- Williams c. 1928–1930

Background information
- Genres: Jazz
- Occupations: Musician; songwriter
- Instrument: Clarinet
- Years active: 1917–1930
- Labels: RCA Victor

Douglas Williams was an American jazz clarinetist and bandleader best known for his contributions to the jazz scene, especially during the early 20th century. He hailed from Memphis, Tennessee. However, the details of Williams' birth remain uncertain, with no official records confirming whether he was born in Memphis or simply made the city his home during his career.

== Career ==
Douglas' first song was written in 1917. It was called "The Hooking Cow Blues." It is worth noting that W. C. Handy, the famous composer and musician, wrote the music.

In 1928, Douglas decided to step out on his own and form his very own jazz trio. He chose talented musicians to join him, including pianist Blaine Elliott and drummer Sam Sims. Their first recording session took place on January 31, 1928, in Memphis. During this session, they cut several tracks, including songs like "Slow Death" and "Roadhouse Stomp."

Seven months later, in August, Blaine Elliott would be replaced with Edgar Brown, with his first recording with the band being "Riverside Blues". Four days later, in September, Williams would start expanding the players in his band to four, with his brother, Nathaniel, playing the cornet in the band. The band name would change to "Douglas Williams Four". Their first recording as a quartet was "Kind Daddy". Blaine Elliot would also make a return, which would be his final recording with Williams. Six days later, Williams would perform with only Edgar Brown in the songs "Friendless Blues", "Baby Jane", Buddy George", and "Neal's Blues".

In 1929, Williams would add another person to the band, guitarist Mel Parker, and changing the band name to "Douglas Williams Orchestra". Their first recording as a quintet was called "Memphis Gal". The band would record 11 more records afterwards until 1930. Not much information about Williams has been recorded after that.

== Playing style ==
Williams played in a style reminiscent to Johnny Dodds, but having more of a "gas pipe" style playing, much like Fess Williams. A great example would be in the 1928 song "Slow Death".

== Discography ==
Williams recorded a total of 26 records between January 31, 1928, and June 5, 1930.

Discography (1928–1930)
#	Artist (credited on label)	Song title	Label	Matrix number	Recording date
1	Harris and Harris	"I Don't Care What You Say"	Victor	BVE-41811	January 31, 1928
2	Harris and Harris	"That Same Cat"	Victor	BVE-41812	January 31, 1928
3	Douglas Williams	"Slow Death"	Victor	BVE-41813	January 31, 1928
4	Douglas Williams	"Roadhouse Stomp"	Victor	BVE-41814	January 31, 1928
5	Douglas Williams	"Far Away Texas Blues"	Victor	BVE-41815	January 31, 1928
6	Thelma Lee and B. Smith	"One Hour To-Night"	Victor	BVE-41816	January 31, 1928
7	Douglas Williams	"Riverside Stomp	Victor	BVE-45466	August 31, 1928
8	Douglas Williams	"Sister Ella"	Victor	BVE-45467	August 31, 1928
9	Douglas Williams Four	"Kind Daddy"	Victor	BVE-45476	September 4, 1928
10	Douglas Williams Four	"Late Hours"	Victor	BVE-45477	September 4, 1928
11	Douglas Williams	"Friendless Blues"	Victor	BVE-47005	September 10, 1928
12	Douglas Williams	"Baby Jane"	Victor	BVE-47006	September 10, 1928
13	Douglas Williams	"Buddy George"	Victor	BVE-47049	September 18, 1929
14	Douglas Williams	"Neal's Blues"	Victor	BVE-47050	September 18, 1929
15	Douglas Williams Orchestra	"Memphis Gal"	Victor	BVE-55592	September 26, 1929
16	Douglas Williams Orchestra	"Clarinet Jiggles"	Victor	BVE-55593	September 26, 1929
17	Douglas Williams Orchestra	"Undertaker Blues"	Victor	BVE-55594	September 26, 1929
18	Douglas Williams Orchestra	"P-Wee Strut"	Victor	BVE-55595	September 26, 1929
19	Douglas Williams Orchestra	"The Beale Street Shiek"	Victor	BVE-56327	October 2, 1929
20	Douglas Williams Orchestra	"Leaving Blues"	Victor	BVE-56328	October 2, 1929
21	Douglas Williams Orchestra	"Thrill Me"	Victor	BVE-56329	October 2, 1929
22	Douglas Williams Orchestra	"Don't Treat Me Like a Dog"	Victor	BVE-56330	October 2, 1929
23	Douglas Williams Orchestra	"Louisiana Hop"	Victor	BVE-62585	June 5, 1930
24	Douglas Williams Orchestra	"Three O'clock Blues"	Victor	BVE-62586	June 5, 1930
25	Douglas Williams Orchestra	"Darktown Jubilee"	Victor	BVE-62587	June 5, 1930
26	Douglas Williams Orchestra	"Russian Blues"	Victor	BVE-62588	June 5, 1930
