= Doug Green =

Doug or Douglas Green may refer to:

- Doug Green (footballer) (born 1951), former Australian rules footballer
- Doug Green (Louisiana politician) (born 1950), former Louisiana insurance commissioner
- Doug Green (Ohio politician) (1955–2021), Republican member of the Ohio House of Representatives
- Douglas Green (cricketer) (1902–1990), Australian cricketer
- Douglas B. Green (born 1946), American musician, arranger and Western music songwriter
- Douglas R. Green (born 1955), American scientist
- Douglas Allan Green (1921-2002), Australian graphic designer

== See also ==
- Doug Greenall (1927–2007), English rugby league footballer
