= Douglas Williams (cricketer) =

Australian cricketer (born 1919)

Personal information
- Born: 3 July 1919; Elwood, Victoria, Australia
- Source: Cricinfo, 19 October 2017

Douglas Samuel Thomas Williams (born 3 July 1919, date of death unknown) was an Australian cricketer and Australian rules footballer. After attending Xavier College and University of Melbourne, he served in the Royal Australian Navy during World War II, reaching the rank of Lieutenant. In 1947 he moved to Western Australia where he played 8 first class cricket matches for Western Australia cricket team from 1948/49 until 1951/52 as well as football for Claremont in the West Australian Football League.
