= International Food Safety Network =

Former organization at Kansas State University

The International Food Safety Network (iFSN) at Kansas State University imparts the opportunity of improving the overall safety of the food supply by connecting all those in the agriculture and food industry.

iFSN offers a resource of evidence-based information through its website, listserves, research projects, on-farm food safety programs, publications, educational initiatives, graduate courses and policy analysis. iFSN used to operate under the direction of Doug Powell.

== History ==
International Food Safety Network began as a communications experiment, collecting and rapidly redistributing information about food safety using the then just-burgeoning Internet.

Created in January 1993, as a combination of Powell's interests in science, media and the public following an outbreak of E. coli O157:H7 associated with Jack in the Box restaurants, in which over 600 were sickened and four died from undercooked hamburgers.

International Food Safety Network's emphasis is on the integration of public perceptions of food safety risks into traditional food safety risk analysis, and engaging the public on the nature of food-related risks and benefits.

Powell and the International Food Safety Network are a primary source for food safety information during outbreaks and are often quoted in mainstream media reports.

The International Food Safety Network was replaced with the bites mailing list and website according to a notice on the former's home page.
