= Douglas Anderson =

Douglas, Doug, or Dougie Anderson may refer to:

== Arts and entertainment ==
- Doug Anderson (poet) (born 1943), American poet, fiction writer, and memoirist
- Doug Anderson (singer) (born 1973), American gospel singer
- Dougie Anderson (born 1976), Scottish television & radio presenter, comedian & author
- Douglas Anderson (television writer) (fl. 1990s), American writer for the television series Guiding Light

== Sports ==
- Doug Anderson (Australian footballer) (1903–1999), Australian rules footballer for Fitzroy
- Doug Anderson (footballer, born 1914) (1914–1989), Scottish association footballer
- Doug Anderson (rugby league) (1926–2016), New Zealand rugby league footballer
- Doug Anderson (ice hockey) (1927–1998), Canadian ice hockey player
- Doug Anderson (footballer, born 1963) (1963–2015), Hong Kong-born footballer who played in the English Football League

== Others ==
- Douglas Anderson (Wisconsin politician), American politician from Wisconsin
- Douglas Leavon Anderson (1939–2013), American educator and politician from Mississippi
- Douglas A. Anderson (born 1959), American fantasy writer, editor, and Tolkien scholar
- Doug Anderson (journalist) (fl. 1969–2011), Australian journalist

== Other uses ==
- Douglas Anderson School of the Arts, high school in Jacksonville, Florida
