= Douglas Bennett (cricketer, born 1886) =

South African cricketer (1886–1982)

Personal information
- Born: 19 November 1886; Peddie, Cape Colony
- Died: 14 August 1982 (aged 95); East London, South Africa

Douglas Bennett (19 November 1886 – 14 August 1982) was a South African cricketer. He played in seven first-class matches from 1912–13 to 1923–24.
