= Doug Kelly (footballer) =

English footballer (1934–2019)

Personal information
- Full name: Douglas Cain Kelly
- Date of birth: 30 May 1934
- Place of birth: Barnsley, England
- Date of death: August 2019 (aged 85)
- Place of death: Barnsley, England
- Position: Striker

Senior career*
Years	Team	Apps	(Gls)
1952–1955	Barnsley	18	(7)
1955–1957	Bradford City	43	(14)
1957–1958	Chesterfield	1	(1)
Total		62	(22)
- * Club domestic league appearances and goals

Douglas Cain Kelly (30 May 1934 – August 2019) was an English professional footballer who played as a striker for Barnsley, Bradford City and Chesterfield. Kelly died in Barnsley in August 2019, at the age of 85.
