= Doug Powell (geographer) =

Doug Powell

Douglas R. Powell (1920–2006) was a geographer at the University of California, Berkeley.

Powell was known for being one of the first snow surveyors in the world. He worked with the California Cooperate Snow Survey for 28 years and established snow surveying programs in Afghanistan and Chile. He was born on November 4th, 1920 in Stockton, California. He received a degree for political science from the College of the Pacific in 1941. He served in the US Army from 1942-1946, receiving special training in mountaineering warfare, before joining the 44th infantry division. He completed his master's degree in geography at the University of California-Berkeley in 1963.

== Awards and recognition ==
- In 1976 the university awarded him the Distinguished Teaching Award.
- He was voted "Best Undergraduate Instructor" by the student body.
- The Western Montana Atlas of Panoramic Aerial Images is dedicated to his memory.
- A memorial fund in his name, the Douglas R. Powell Fund for Field Geography, was established at UC Berkeley.
