= Douglas Davis =

Douglas or Doug Davis may refer to:

== Sports ==
- Doug Davis (American football) (1944–2011), American football player
- Doug Davis (infielder) (born 1962), American Major League Baseball infielder
- Doug Davis (pitcher) (born 1975), American Major League Baseball pitcher

== Other fields ==
- Douglas Davis (artist) (1933–2014), American media artist and art writer
- Doug Davis (aviator) (1899–1934 or 1900–1934), American aviator, barnstormer and air racer
- Doug Davis (producer) (born 1972), American music industry executive, lawyer, and producer
- Doug E. Davis (born 1977), American politician
- Doug E. Fresh (Douglas E. Davis, born 1966), American emcee, record producer and beat boxer
- Doug Davis, a character in the 2014 film Cooties

== See also ==
- Doug Davies (disambiguation)
