= Douglas Alan Clark =

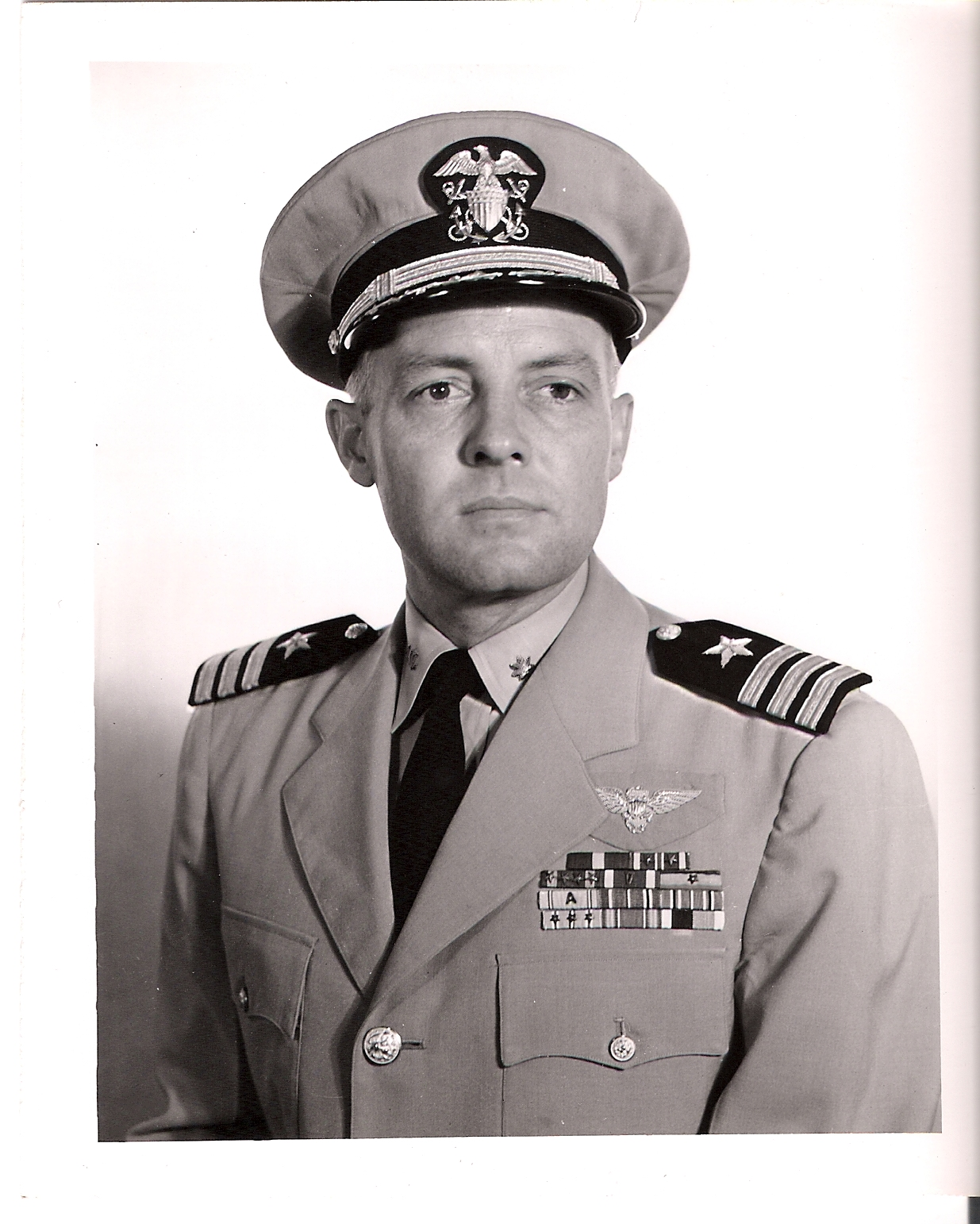

Captain Douglas Alan Clark (May 26, 1917 – August 6, 2012) was an American fighter pilot who received the Navy Cross for his actions while commanding Fighting Squadron Thirty (VF-30), attached to the USS Belleau Wood (CVL-24), on 21 March 1945. Then-Lieutenant Commander Clark, while on combat air patrol, directed his squadron to attack an enemy formation of Japanese bombers which was heavily protected by fighters. Even though his squadron was significantly outnumbered, they were able to shoot down over 40 enemy aircraft in 30 minutes without suffering one loss. Clark himself shot down one enemy fighter and damaged another during the confrontation. His quick action and the superiority of his squadron turned back what would surely have been a devastating attack on his carrier group.

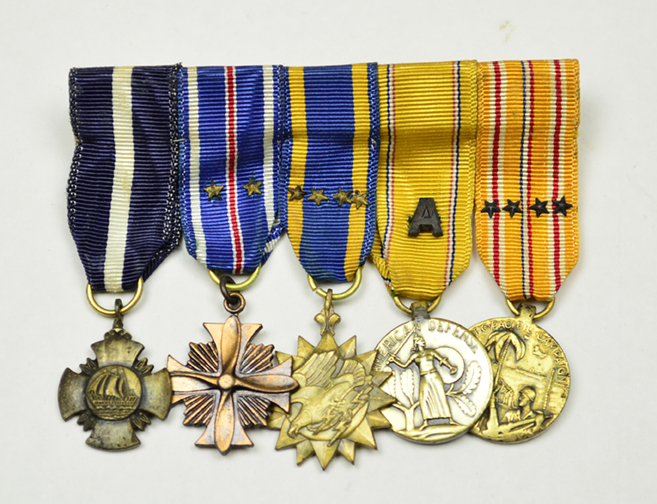

Along with the Navy Cross, Captain Clark received three Distinguished Flying Crosses, five Air Medals, and a Navy and Marine Corps Commendation Medal during his time in combat in the Pacific Theater as a naval aviator. After the war, he took part in the development of the Navy's jet fighter program, as well as served in the Pentagon.

Clark retired from the U.S. Navy in 1963, and moved to south Florida where he lived until his death on August 6, 2012, at the age of 95. He was buried in section 8 at Arlington National Cemetery with full military honors.

== Medals and Accolades ==
Captain Douglas Alan Clark received the following medals:

Badge	Naval Aviator Badge		
1st row	Navy Cross	Distinguished Flying Cross w/ 2 service stars	
2nd row	Air Medal w/ 4 service stars	Navy and Marine; Corps Commendation Medal	Presidential Unit Citation (Navy and Marine Corps) w/ 1 service star
3rd row	American Defense Service Medal w/ Atlantic Device	EAME Campaign Medal	American Campaign Medal
4th row	Asiatic–Pacific Campaign Medal w/ 4 service stars	World War II Victory Medal	Navy Occupation Service Medal
