= Doug Smith (footballer, born 1922) =

Australian rules footballer

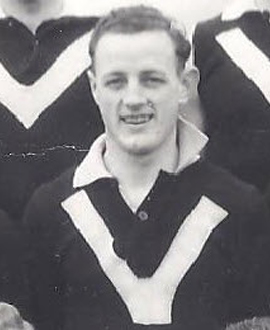
- Smith in 1943

Personal information
- Full name: Douglas George Smith
- Born: 19 March 1922; Scottsdale, Tasmania
- Died: 1 September 2009 (aged 87)
- Original team: Scottsdale
- Height: 187 cm (6 ft 2 in)
- Weight: 80 kg (176 lb)

Playing career^{1}
Years	Club	Games (Goals)
1943	Collingwood	2 (0)
- ^{1} Playing statistics correct to the end of 1943.

Douglas George Smith (19 March 1922 – 1 September 2009) was an Australian rules footballer who played with Collingwood in the Victorian Football League (VFL).
