= Doug Morgan (Australian footballer) =

Australian rules footballer (1886–1958)

Personal information
- Full name: Edward Douglas Morgan
- Born: 30 March 1886; Newport, Wales
- Died: 21 November 1958 (aged 72); Goodwood, South Australia
- Height: 178 cm (5 ft 10 in)
- Weight: 76 kg (168 lb)

Playing career^{1}
Years	Club	Games (Goals)
1909–11	Geelong	18 (3)
- ^{1} Playing statistics correct to the end of 1911.

Edward Douglas Morgan (30 March 1886 – 21 November 1958) was an Australian rules footballer who played with Geelong in the Victorian Football League (VFL).
