= Doug Evans =

Douglas or Doug Evans may refer to:

- Doug Evans, founder of Juicero
- Doug Evans (American football) (born 1970), retired American football player
- Doug Evans (ice hockey) (born 1963), retired Canadian ice hockey player
- Doug Evans (fighter) (born 1980), American lightweight mixed martial artist
- Douglas Evans (actor) (1904–1968), American actor
- Douglas Evans (children's author)
