= Doug Wright (disambiguation) =

Doug Wright (born 1962) is an American playwright, librettist, and screenwriter.

Doug Wright may also refer to:

- Doug Wright (cricketer) (1914–1998), English cricketer
- Doug Wright (cartoonist) (1917–1983), Canadian cartoonist, best known for Nipper/Doug Wright's Family
- Doug Wright (The Bill), husband of Sgt. Nikki Wright
- Doug Wright (footballer) (1917–1992), English footballer

== See also ==
- Douglas Wright (disambiguation)
