= Doug Ford (disambiguation) =

Doug Ford (born 1964) is a Canadian politician and businessman and the current premier of Ontario.

Douglas or Doug Ford may also refer to:

- Douglas Ford (bishop) (1917–2007), Anglican bishop in Canada
- Douglas Ford (British Army officer) (1918–1943), British Army officer awarded the George Cross
- Douglas Morey Ford (1851–1916), English lawyer and novelist
- Doug Ford (golfer) (1922–2018), American golfer
- Doug Ford (cricketer) (1928−2019, Australian cricketer
- Doug Ford Sr. (1933–2006), Canadian businessman, Member of Provincial Parliament (Ontario), father of the premier
- Doug Ford (musician) (born 1945), Australian rock musician
