= Doug Morgan (footballer, born 1890) =

Scottish footballer

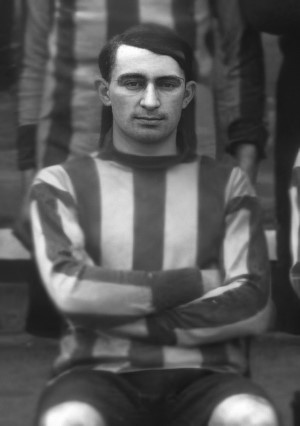
- Morgan while with Hull City

Personal information
- Full name: Douglas Morgan
- Date of birth: 18 June 1890
- Place of birth: Inverkeithing, Scotland
- Date of death: 31 December 1916 (aged 26)
- Place of death: West Flanders, Belgium
- Height: 5 ft 9 in (1.75 m)
- Position: Left back

Senior career*
| Years | Team | Apps | (Gls) |
- Inverkeithing Renton
| –1913 | Inverkeithing United | | |
| 1913–1915 | Hull City | 52 | (0) |
- * Club domestic league appearances and goals

Douglas Morgan (18 June 1890 – 31 December 1916) was a Scottish professional footballer who played as a left back in the Football League for Hull City.

== Personal life ==
Morgan served as a gunner in the Royal Garrison Artillery during the First World War and died at a Field Ambulance in West Flanders on New Year's Eve 1916, of wounds caused by a shell blast. He was buried in Vlamertinghe Military Cemetery.

== Career statistics ==
Appearances and goals by club, season and competition
| Club | Season | League | | | FA Cup | | Total | |
| Club | Season | Division | Apps | Goals | Apps | Goals | Apps | Goals |
|---|---|---|---|---|---|---|---|---|
| Hull City | 1913–14 | Second Division | 23 | 0 | 2 | 0 | 25 | 0 |
| Hull City | 1914–15 | Second Division | 29 | 0 | 4 | 0 | 33 | 0 |
| Career total | | | 52 | 0 | 6 | 0 | 58 | 0 |

== Honours ==
Inverkeithing Renton

- Fife Cup: 1910–11

Inverkeithing United

- Scottish Junior Cup: 1912–13
