= Doug Applegate =

Doug Applegate may refer to:

- Douglas Applegate (1928–2021), American politician, member of the U.S. House of Representatives from Ohio
- Doug Applegate (California politician), retired Marine from San Diego County who ran for Congress
