= Douglas Davies (cricketer) =

South African cricketer (1881–1949)

Personal information
- Born: 10 March 1881; King William's Town, South Africa
- Died: 22 December 1949 (aged 68); Bulawayo, Zimbabwe
- Source: Cricinfo, 6 December 2020

Douglas Davies (10 March 1881 – 22 December 1949) was a South African cricketer. He played in six first-class matches from 1902/03 to 1913/14.
