= Dictionary of Art Historians =

Online dictionary and open access archive

- Website type: Online Encyclopedia
- Owner: Duke University
- Creators: Lee R. Sorensen and Monique Daniels
- Website: arthistorians.info
- Commercial: No
- Current status: Online
- Content license: CC BY-SA 4.0

The Dictionary of Art Historians (DAH) is an online encyclopedia of topics relating to art historians, art critics and their dictionaries. The mission of the project is to provide free, reliable, English-language information on published art historians.

The DAH was started in 1986 as a notecard project indexing art historians by the editors Lee R. Sorensen and Monique Daniels. In 2002, the project was migrated to the internet, and in 2010 it was adopted by the art history department of Duke University. In 2017, the DAH was adopted by the Wired! Lab at Duke University and a new version of the site was launched in 2018. The project enjoys collaboration with the Journal of Art Historiography, which started in 2010.

Starting as a database of art historians mentioned in major art historiographies, the site has grown through the comments and contributions of various authors specializing in national fields of art history.
