= Douglas Ferguson (artist) =

American fashion designer

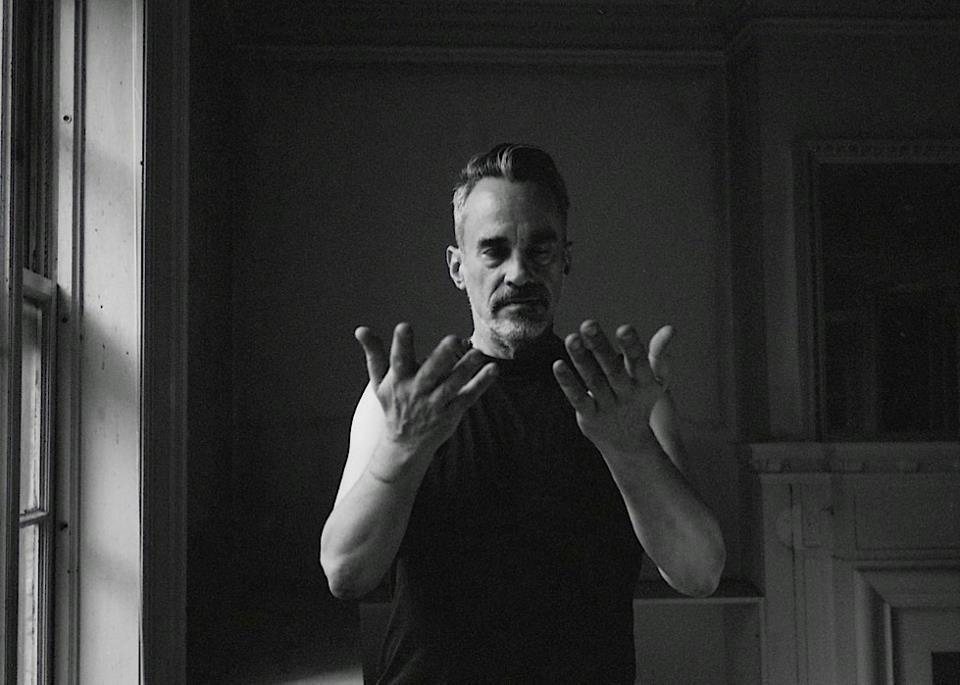
- Douglas Ferguson
- Born: 7 September 1951 (age 73); America

Douglas Ferguson (born 1951) is a multidisciplinary artist mainly known for his fashion designs using enamelled metal mesh and hand-painted leather which received widespread exposure in the 1980s. Since starting out in the 1970s as Diana Vreeland's voluntary assistant at the Metropolitan Museum of Art's Costume Institute, he has also worked as an interior designer and film-maker.

== Early life and education ==
Douglas Richard Ferguson was born in 1951. He studied fine art in Rome, and in Philadelphia, but dropped out after three years, saying that he wanted to 'try everything' rather than focus on painting as his tutors wished.

Among other jobs, he worked as a model, a stitcher-in of labels, and a taxicab driver, but most notably worked as a personal assistant to Diana Vreeland at the Costume Institute. As this was a volunteer role, he subsidized it by driving a Checker Taxi at night. He went on to work as Diana Vreeland's exhibition assistant for the 1979-81 Costume Institute shows Fashions of the Hapsburg Era and The Manchu Dragon.

== Career ==
Ferguson launched his career at the turn of the 1970s/80s with hand-painted leather goods and furniture. On 20 August 1980, Harper's Bazaar featured a photograph by Francesco Scavullo of the model Kelly Le Brock wrapped in Ferguson's painted leathers. One of Ferguson's first successes was a decorative wooden flapper doll for the Mudd Club, which attracted the attention of the designer Patricia Field and led to her commissioning his hand-painted leather and chiffon dresses for her boutique. He also made painted leather garments, including shawls and kilts for Maud Frizon, Carol Rollo at 'Riding High', and Johnny Ward. His designs were also stocked by Robert Lee Morris in his Artwear shop, a showcase for artisan jewelry and accessories. In 1981 Ferguson was highlighted by The New York Times as one of a new wave of up-and-coming British and American designers alongside 'Vivien Westwood' [sic], Anna Sui, and Mary Jane Marcasiano. Although his hand-painted suede and chiffon work was described as initially seeming 'more like rags than fashion,' once it was on a figure, it came together to create a look that 'seemed at once ancient and modern'.

Soon afterwards, Ferguson developed a technique of painting chain mail with automotive paint, which enabled him to apply medieval, Chinese or Art Deco motifs to the metal. The mesh he used had originally been developed by Whiting & Davis in the 1920s as a material for evening bags and purses, but his techniques were unique to himself. These mesh designs, which he made up into dresses, shawls, and other garments, proved popular and were featured on a number of magazine covers, including two covers for Cosmopolitan in 1984 and 1985, a 1984 cover for New York Magazine, and a Vogue supplement showing a mesh dress emblazoned with the Statue of Liberty. Tina Turner also wore a Ferguson mesh dress for a Vanity Fair cover.

He designed the costumes for the 1983 premiere of William Forsythe's production of Square Deal (Joffrey Ballet).

In 2012 Ferguson was designing for private clients.

== Films ==
Ferguson has also worked in film-making on a small scale. His films include:

- The Box, a Super 8 college of parrots and dolls.
- Bogus Yoga, a video installation made whilst in Switzerland as an artist-in-residence.
- Free Fall (1994), produced with Gea Kalthegener, a feature-length documentary on the actor Ron Vawter, who died during filming. The New York Film Festival and the Filmfest München both included it in their official selections for 1994. Jill Godmilow, who was also making a film about Vawter's work at the time (Roy Cohn/Jack Smith, 1994) summed up Free Fall as a record of Vawter's last days, saying "If you want to die with Ron... you can see that film."
- Full Quote Bergman (2003), a collaboration with Brock Labrenz and Richard Siegal, commissioned and produced by William Forsythe's Ballet Frankfurt, and premiered in Frankfurt in January 2004. Described as an 'inquiry into 21st century cannibalism,' Ferguson described it as a 'literary thesis in the form of a film that happens to be a ballet,' citing Ingmar Bergman's Persona and Susan Sontag's article on that film as influences. It was also screened at the Italian Gender Bender film festival.

== Exhibitions ==
- 1987: East Village: The New Vanguard, Fashion Institute of Technology, New York. Hand-painted leather cape and kilt.
- 1989: The Historical Mode: Fashion and Art in the 1980s, Fashion Institute of Technology, New York. Mesh evening dresses.
- 2003: Goddess: The Classical Mode, Metropolitan Museum of Art. Three of Ferguson's 1985 enamelled mesh outfits.
- 2004: Goddess, MoMu, Antwerp, Belgium. Travelling version of above exhibition.
