= Doug Bennett (footballer) =

Australian rules footballer

Personal information
- Full name: Douglas Bennett
- Born: 3 December 1894; Woodend, Victoria
- Died: 3 March 1975 (aged 80); Euroa, Victoria
- Original team: Coburg
- Height: 179 cm (5 ft 10 in)

Playing career^{1}
Years	Club	Games (Goals)
1917	Fitzroy	4 (2)
- ^{1} Playing statistics correct to the end of 1917.

Douglas Bennett (3 December 1894 – 3 March 1975) was an Australian rules footballer who played with Fitzroy in the Victorian Football League (VFL).
