= Doug Chapman =

Doug Chapman may refer to:

- Doug Chapman (stuntman), Canadian stunt performer and actor
- Doug Chapman (American football) (born 1977), American former running back
- Doug Chapman (Australian footballer) (1889–1975), Australian rules footballer
- Doug Chapman (ice hockey) (born 1930), Canadian hockey player
- Douglas Chapman (politician) (born 1955), Member of Parliament for Dunfermline & West Fife since 2015
