= Douglas Martin =

Douglas or Doug Martin may refer to:

== Sports ==
=== American football ===
- Doug Martin (American football coach) (born 1963), American football coach
- Doug Martin (defensive end) (1957–2026), American football defensive end
- Doug Martin (running back) (1989–2025), American football running back

=== Other sports ===
- Doug Martin (basketball) (1936–2014), American college basketball coach
- Doug Martin (golfer) (born 1966), American professional golfer
- Doug Martin (swimmer) (born 1955), Canadian Olympic swimmer

== Others ==
- Douglas Martin (born 1961), American director of the American Repertory Ballet
- Douglas A. Martin (born 1973), American poet, novelist and short-story writer
- Douglas J. Martin (1927–2010), New Zealander leader in The Church of Jesus Christ of Latter-day Saints
- Douglas Wayne Martin (1951–1993), Branch Davidian
- J. Douglas Martin (1927–2020), Canadian Bahá'í, member of the Universal House of Justice, author
