= Doug Sutherland =

Doug Sutherland may refer to:

- Doug Sutherland (American politician) (born 1937), American politician
- Doug Sutherland (American football) (1948–2022), American NFL player
- Doug Sutherland (Australian politician) (born 1932), former Sydney Mayor
- Douglas Sutherland (1919–1995), British author and journalist
