= Douglas Brown (cricketer) =

Jamaican-born cricketer

Personal information
- Full name: Douglas Richard Brown
- Born: 2 February 1972 (age 54); Jamaica
- Batting: Right-handed
- Bowling: Right-arm medium-fast

International information
- National side: Turks and Caicos Islands

Domestic team information
- Years: Team
- 2007/08: Turks and Caicos Islands

Career statistics
| Competition | Twenty20 |
|---|---|
| Matches | 1 |
| Runs scored | 4 |
| Batting average | 4.00 |
| 100s/50s | –/– |
| Top score | 4 |
| Balls bowled | – |
| Wickets | – |
| Bowling average | – |
| 5 wickets in innings | – |
| 10 wickets in match | – |
| Best bowling | – |
| Catches/stumpings | –/– |
- Source: Cricinfo, 8 March 2012

Douglas Richard Brown (born 23 February 1972) is a Jamaican-born cricketer who plays for the Turks and Caicos Islands. Brown is a right-handed batsman who bowls right-arm fast-medium.

Brown played a single Twenty20 match for the Turks and Caicos Islands against Montserrat in the 2008 Stanford 20/20 at the Stanford Cricket Ground. He was run out for 4 runs in this match by Lionel Baker, with the Turks and Caicos Islands making just 67 runs in their twenty overs. Montserrat went on to win the match by 9 wickets.
