= Douglas Brown (author) =

American author

Douglas Brown is an American author and market research executive who founded Black Book Research, a healthcare intelligence firm. He wrote The Black Book of Outsourcing (2005) and The Black Book of Reshoring (2026).

== Biography ==
Brown was born in 1959. He studied political science and public administration at the University of Florida, later earned a master's in healthcare administration from the University of Houston, and rounded out his training with postgraduate work in global marketing at the London School of Economics.

In 2003, he co-founded the Brown-Wilson Group, an outsourcing research consultancy whose Black Book of Outsourcing brand was later acquired by Datamonitor. He went on to found Black Book Research and, in October 2025, gave a keynote at openEHR's EHRCON25 conference in Barcelona.

== Publications ==
- The Black Book of Outsourcing: How to Manage the Changes, Challenges, and Opportunities (with Scott Wilson). Hoboken, NJ: John Wiley & Sons, 2005. ISBN 978-0-471-71889-5
- The Black Book of Reshoring. Hoboken, NJ: Wiley, 2026 (256 pp.). ISBN 978-1-394-39373-2
