= Douglas C. Bennett =

American academic administrator

- Born: 1946 (age 79–80); Rochester, New York
- Occupations: political science professor, President of Earlham College
- Known for: Served as President of Earlham College from 1996-2011

Douglas C. Bennett (born 1946) is a former president of Earlham College, located in Richmond, Indiana. He was installed as president in 1996. Beginning in 1997, Bennett was also a member of the politics department at Earlham.

== Background and career ==
Bennett grew up in Rochester, New York and graduated from Haverford College in 1968. He obtained his MPhil and his Ph.D. in Political Science from Yale University. Bennett taught political science at Temple University from 1973 to 1989, before becoming the president of Earlham College. He credits Gerhard Spiegler as his inspiration to become a college president.

== Media attention ==
Bennett became known throughout the state of Indiana for dismissing the majority of the board of directors of Conner Prairie in June 2003, formerly a wholly owned subsidiary of Earlham College. This action precipitated involvement from Indiana's attorney general leading to a split between the two organizations including a division of a substantial endowment established by philanthropist Eli Lilly.

Earlham College, during Bennett's tenure, gained national media attention when political analyst, architect of the Iraq War, and Fox News commentator William Kristol, was hit with a cream pie by a student while giving a speech on foreign policy in March 2005. The pie hit Kristol's face and also reached Bennett's shoulder.

== Early career ==
Bennett was vice president and chief operating officer of the American Council of Learned Societies in New York City. He was also the Vice President and Provost at Reed College (Portland, Oregon) and has served on several education-related organizations, such as the National Association of Independent Colleges and Universities (NAICU) or the National Advisory Board of the National Survey of Student Engagement (NSSE).

== Retirement ==
On August 4, 2010, Earlham announced Bennett's intention to retire at the end of the 2010–2011 school year. He and his family live in Maine. Bennett was a member of the advisory committee for the Quaker United Nations Office in New York and served on the Corporation for the American Friends Service Committee.
