= Doug Graham =

Doug or Douglas Graham may refer to:

- Doug Graham (New Zealand politician) (born 1942)
- Douglas Graham (British Army officer) (1893–1971), British Army general
- Douglas Graham, 5th Duke of Montrose (1852–1925), Scottish nobleman
- Doug Graham (Canadian politician), Canadian politician in the Yukon Legislative Assembly
- Doug Graham (Winners & Losers), fictional character from Australian drama series Winners & Losers
- Doug Graham (sailor) (born 1959), United States Virgin Islands sailor
