= Doug Rogers =

Doug or Douglas Rogers may refer to:

- Doug Rogers (American football) (born 1960), American football player
- Doug Rogers (judoka) (1941–2020), Canadian Olympic competitor in judo
- Douglas Rogers (writer) (born 1968), Zimbabwean journalist, travel writer and memoirist

== See also ==
- Roger Douglas (born 1937), New Zealand politician
