= List of University of Essex people =

The following is a list of notable University of Essex people (in chronological or alphabetical order).

== Chancellors ==
- Rab Butler (1966–1982)
- Sir Patrick Nairne (1982–1997)
- Michael Nolan, Baron Nolan (1997–2002)
- Andrew Phillips, Baron Phillips of Sudbury (2003–2014)
- Shami Chakrabarti, Baroness Chakrabarti (2014–2017)
- John Bercow (2017–2021)
- Sarah Perry (2023–)

== Notable faculty ==
=== Vice-Chancellors ===
- Sir Albert Sloman (1963–1987)
- Sir Martin Harris (1987–1993)
- Ron J. Johnston (1993–1995)
- Sir Ivor Crewe (1995–2007)
- Colin Riordan (2007–2012)
- Anthony Forster (2012–2024)
- Frances Bowen (2025 - )

=== Economics ===
- George Christopher Archibald - Professor (1964–1971)
- Anthony Barnes Atkinson - Professor of Economics (1971 to 1976)
- Rex Bergstrom - Professor of Economics (1970–1992)
- Graciela Chichilnisky - Chair in Economics (1980 to 1981)
- Sanjeev Goyal - Professor of Economics (2003-2006)
- Oliver Hart - Lecturer in Economics (1974 to 1975)
- Ravi Kanbur - Professor in economics (1983–87)
- David Laidler - Lecturer (1966–1969)
- Richard Lipsey - Head Professor of Economics (1963–1969)
- Michio Morishima - Visiting Professor of Economics (1968 to 1970)
- Abhinay Muthoo - Head of Department of Economics (2000 to 2007); Professor of Economics (1998 to 2008); Reader (1995 to 1998); Lecturer (1992 to 1995).
- Motty Perry - Professor of Economics
- Peter C.B. Phillips - Lecturer in Economics (1972 to 1976)
- Anthony Shorrocks - Professor of Economics
- Anthony Venables - Lecturer in Economics (1978 to 1979)

=== Sciences ===
- George Alfred Barnard - Professor of Mathematics (1966 to 1975)
- Richard Bartle - Senior Lecturer and Honorary Professor of Computer Science
- Charles George Broyden - Senior Lecturer and Professor of Mathematics (1967 to 1986)
- Mohammed Ghanbari - Professor, Department of Electronic Systems Engineering (1996 - )
- Martin Henson - Professor of Computer Science
- Owen Holland - Professor of Computer Science
- Rodney Loudon - Professor of Theoretical Physics
- Edward Tsang - Director of Centre for Computational Finance and Economic Agents; Professor of Computer Science
- Yorick Wilks - Professor of Computer Science and Linguistics

=== Humanities ===
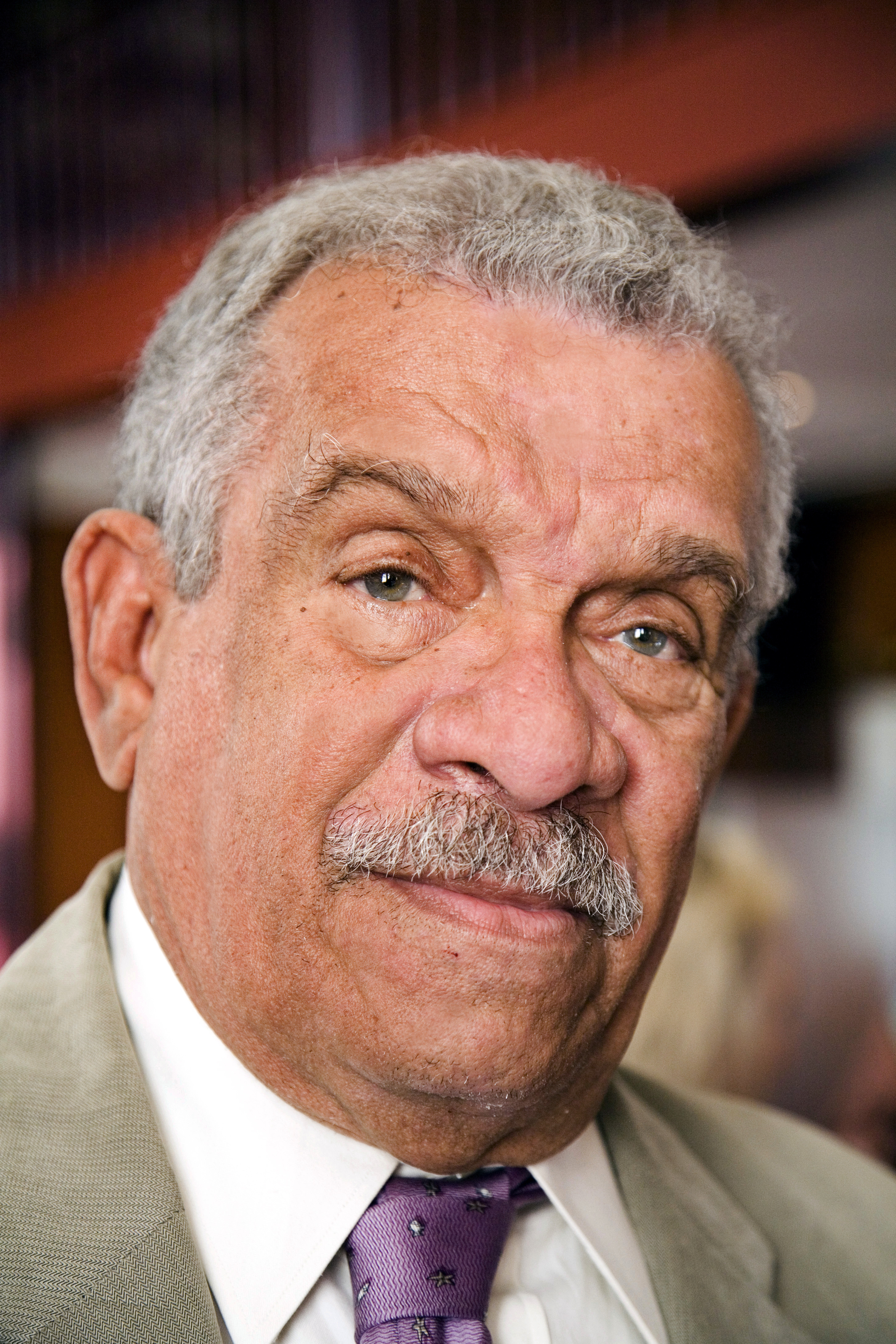
Derek Walcott

- Robert D. Borsley - Professor of Linguistics (2000 - )
- Peter Carruthers - Lecturer, Philosophy Department (1985–1991)
- Donald Davie - Professor of Literature (1964–1968)
- Peter Kenneth Dews - Professor of Philosophy (1988 - )
- Elaine Feinstein - Assistant Lecturer, English Literature (1967–1970)
- Matt Lodder - Senior Lecturer, Art History and Interdisciplinary Studies (2013 - )
- David Musselwhite - Senior Lecturer, English Literature (1974–2010)
- Lucy Noakes - Professor of History (2017 - )
- José Emilio Pacheco - Visiting Professor of Literature
- Michael Podro - Professor of Art History (1973 to 1997)
- Mark Sacks - Professor of Philosophy (1993–2008)
- Derek Walcott - Nobel Laureate 1992, Professor of Poetry (2010 - 2015)
- Dawn Adès - Professor of Art History

=== Law ===
- Steve Peers, Professor of European laws
- Paulo Gonet Branco, Attorney General of Brazil.

=== Social sciences ===
- Brian Barry - Professor of Politics
- Robin Blackburn - Professor of Sociology
- Jean Blondel - Professor of Politics (1964 to 1984)
- Kevin Boyle - former director, Human Rights Centre (3 terms)
- Hugh Brogan - Professor of History, (1974 to 1998)
- Ian Craib - Professor of Sociology (1973–2003)
- Vic Gatrell - Professor of British History (2003 - )
- Paul Hunt - former director, Human Rights Centre (2001 to 2003)
- Bob Jessop - Professor, Department of Government (1975 to 1989)
- Anthony King - Professor, Department of Government
- Alan Knight - Lecturer, History Department (1973 to 1985)
- Ernesto Laclau - Visiting Professor, Department of Government
- Michael Mann
- Geoffrey Martin - Professor, Department of History
- Harvey Molotch - Professor of Sociology
- Sir Nigel S. Rodley - current Head of Human Rights Centre (also a graduate: see below)
- John Scott - Professor of Sociology (1994-2008) and Honorary Doctorate
- Fatos Tarifa - guest lecturer
- Peter Townsend - founding professor of Sociology

== Notable alumni ==
=== Academia in economics ===
- Erkin Bairam - Professor of Economics, University of Otago (1991–2001)
- Panicos O. Demetriades - Professor of Financial Economics, University of Leicester
- Jean Drèze - Professor of Economics, Delhi School of Economics
- Colm Kearney - Professor of International Business, University College Dublin
- Graham Loomes - Professor of Economics, University of Warwick
- Christopher A. Pissarides - Nobel Laureate 2010 British-Cypriot Economists, Professor of Economics at the London School of Economics
- Michael Riordan - Professor of Economics, Columbia University
- Norman Schofield - Professor of Political Economy, Washington University in St. Louis
- Richard J. Smith - Professor of Econometric Theory and Economic Statistics, University of Cambridge
- Yanis Varoufakis - Professor of Economics, University of Athens; Finance Minister of Greece (2015 onward)
- John Whalley - Professor of International Trade at University of Western Ontario

=== Academia in other areas ===
- Martin J. Ball - Emeritus Professor of Linguistics, Bangor University, Cymru/Wales
- Stephen J. Ball - Karl Mannheim Professor of Sociology of Education at the Institute of Education of University College London
- Richard Barbrook - Senior Lecturer in Humanities and Social Science, University of Westminster
- Manuel Barcia, Pro-Vice-Chancellor for Global Engagement, University of Bath
- John Barrell - Professor of English, University of York
- David M. Barrett - Professor of Political Science, Villanova University
- Eva Collins - Professor of Management, University of Waikato
- John Fauvel - historian of mathematics, Open University
- James Gomez - Associate Professor at the School of International Studies, Universiti Utara Malaysia
- Stephen F. Jones - academic in the field of Eastern European affairs
- Kusuma Karunaratne - Sri Lankan academic; university administrator; professor and scholar in the fields of Sinhalese language, comparative literature, and sociology, University of Colombo
- Ernesto Laclau - Post-Marxist political theorist at Northwestern University; Visiting Professor at Essex's Department of Government
- Jill Marsden - scholar of the work of philosopher Friedrich Wilhelm Nietzsche; lecturer at the University of Bolton
- Maxine Molyneux - Professor of Sociology, Institute of Latin American Studies, University of London
- John Warwick Montgomery - American lawyer, theologian and academic known for his work in the field of Christian apologetics; Distinguished Research Professor of Philosophy and Christian Thought at Patrick Henry College
- Farish Ahmad Noor - Senior Fellow, Nanyang Technological University, Singapore
- Alberto Pérez-Gómez - Professor of Architectural History, McGill University
- David Robertson - Professor of Politics, Oxford University
- Nigel S. Rodley - international human rights lawyer and academic, University of Essex
- Deborah Sugg Ryan - Professor of Design History and Theory, University of Portsmouth
- Michael Tappin - academic associated with Keele University
- Michael Taylor - Professor of Politics, University of Washington
- Nathan Widder - Professor of Political Theory, Royal Holloway, University of London
- Jonathan Wilson - Fletcher Professor of Rhetoric and Debate; Director of the Center for Humanities, Tufts University
- Wong Chin Huat - Malaysian political scientist, activist and columnist

=== Politics and government ===
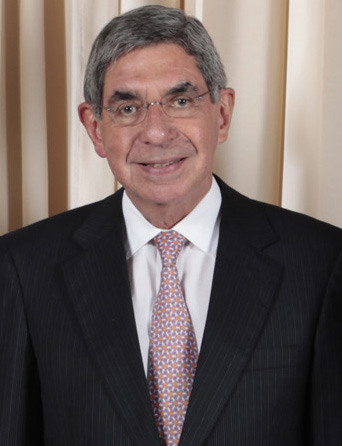
Óscar Arias

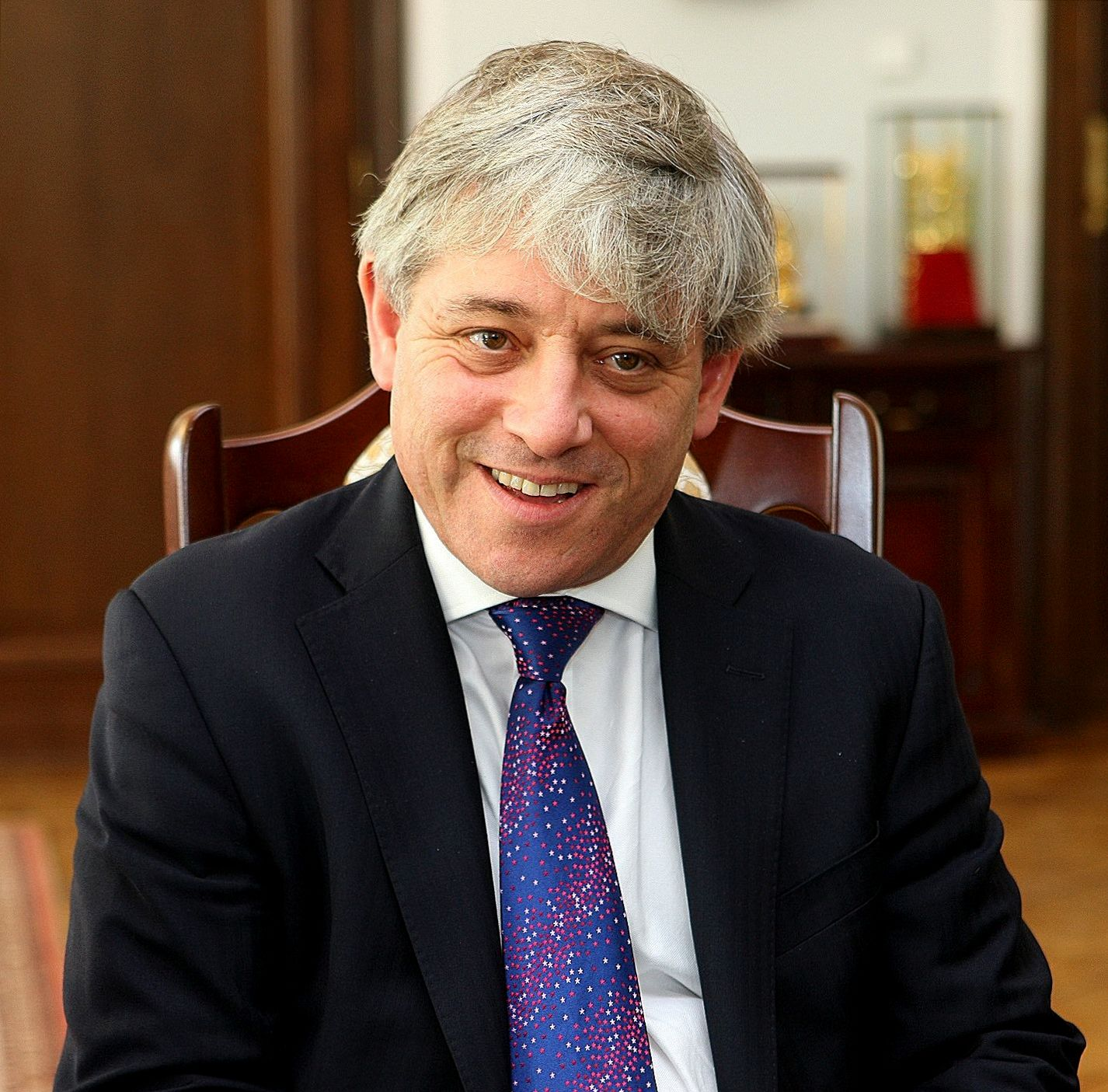
John Bercow

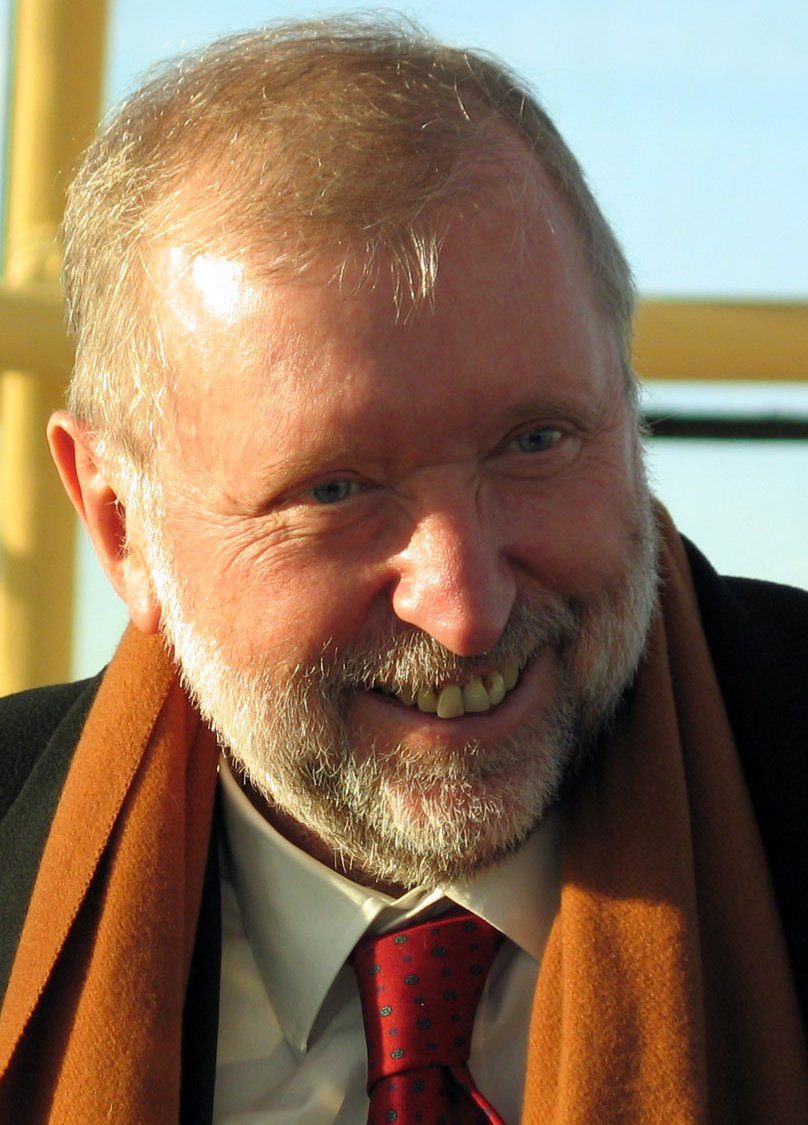
Dimitrij Rupel

- Martin Docherty-Hughes - Scottish National Party politician
- Óscar Arias - President of Costa Rica and 1987 Nobel Peace Prize Winner
- Ian Austin - Former MP for Dudley North
- Sima Sami Bahous - Jordanian Executive Director of UN Women
- John Bercow - Speaker of the House of Commons
- John Biehl - Chilean lawyer, political scientist and diplomat
- Thozamile Botha - South African politician
- Virginia Bottomley - Conservative Party politician
- Dragiša Burzan - Serbian Ambassador to the United Kingdom, former Foreign Minister of Montenegro
- Shirin Sharmin Chaudhury - Speaker of the Bangladesh National Assembly
- Fátima Choi - Director of Audit, Macau SAR, China
- James Duddridge - Conservative Party politician, MP for Rochford and Southend East
- Sean Farren - former Northern Irish politician
- Anne Gibson, Baroness Gibson of Market Rasen - British trade unionist
- Reshef Hen - former member of the Knesset
- Peter Housden - Permanent Secretary, Department for Communities and Local Government
- John Howarth - Labour Party Politician, MEP for South East England
- Ibrahim Jazi - Jordanian Minister of State for Prime Ministry Affairs
- Omar Asghar Khan - Pakistani social activist, economist and politician
- Leung Yiu-chung - member of the Hong Kong SAR Legislative Council
- Siobhain McDonagh - Labour Party politician
- Priti Patel - Conservative Party politician
- Donald C. Pogue - Chief Judge, United States Court of International Trade
- Dimitrij Rupel - first Foreign Minister of Republic of Slovenia
- Mark Shields - Deputy Commissioner of the Jamaica Constabulary Force from 2005 to 2009
- Duncan Shipley-Dalton - former Northern Irish politician
- David Triesman, Baron Triesman - Labour Party Member in the House of Lords; Chairman of the English Football Association
- Yanis Varoufakis - Professor of Economics, University of Athens; Finance Minister of Greece (2015 onward)
- Hoshyar Zebari - Iraqi Minister of Foreign Affairs

=== Business and economics ===
- Richard Douthwaite - economist, co-founder of Feasta
- Már Guðmundsson - Former Governor of the Central Bank of Iceland
- Hanif Lalani - ex-CEO of BT Global Services
- Charles Mbire - Ugandan businessman, entrepreneur and industrialist
- Thorarinn G. Petursson - Chief Economist of the Central Bank of Iceland
- George Provopoulos - Governor of the Bank of Greece and European Central Bank Governing Council Member.
- Nasrat Khalid - Social entrepreneur, founder at Aseel

=== Actors and directors ===
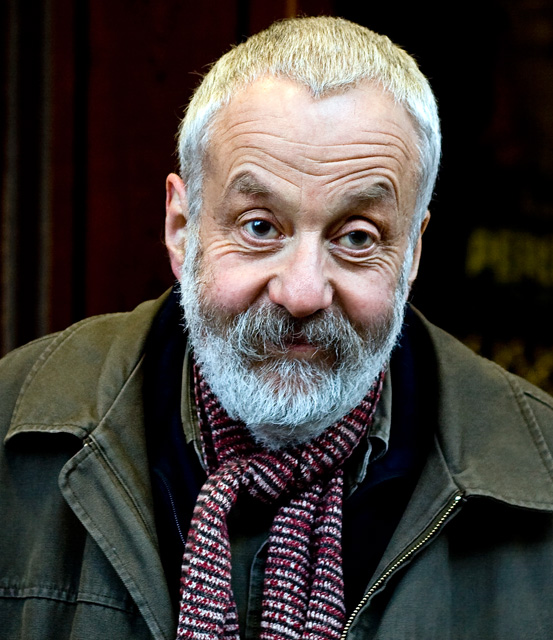
Mike Leigh

- Nick Broomfield - documentary filmmaker
- Stephen Daldry - film and theatre director (East 15 Acting School), BAFTA award-winner
- Rhys Frake-Waterfield - producer, writer and director of horror films
- Blake Harrison - actor (Neil from The Inbetweeners) (East 15 Acting School)
- Vera Kolodzig - actress in theatre productions and several Portuguese soap operas (East 15 Acting School)
- Mike Leigh - film and theatre director (East 15 Acting School)
- Alison Steadman - actress (East 15 Acting School), twice nominated for BAFTA award
- David Yates - multi-BAFTA winning English film and television director

=== Law and order ===
- Mariela Belski – lawyer; Executive Director, Amnesty International Argentina
- Peter Joslin - Chief Constable of Warwickshire
- Michael J. Todd - Chief Constable of Greater Manchester from 2002 until 2008
- Mark Watson-Gandy – barrister

=== Media and journalism ===
- Dotun Adebayo - radio presenter on BBC FiveLive
- Chris Boucher - television screenwriter, script editor and novelist
- Brian Hanrahan - BBC foreign correspondent
- Nick Margerrison - radio presenter on Kerrang! Radio

=== Musicians ===
- Gilad Atzmon - Israeli-born British jazz saxophonist
- Clint Boon - keyboardist and lead singer of the Inspiral Carpets
- John Etheridge - British jazz/fusion guitarist associated with the Canterbury Scene
- Steve Chandra Savale - Asian Dub Foundation guitarist

=== Architecture and urban planning ===
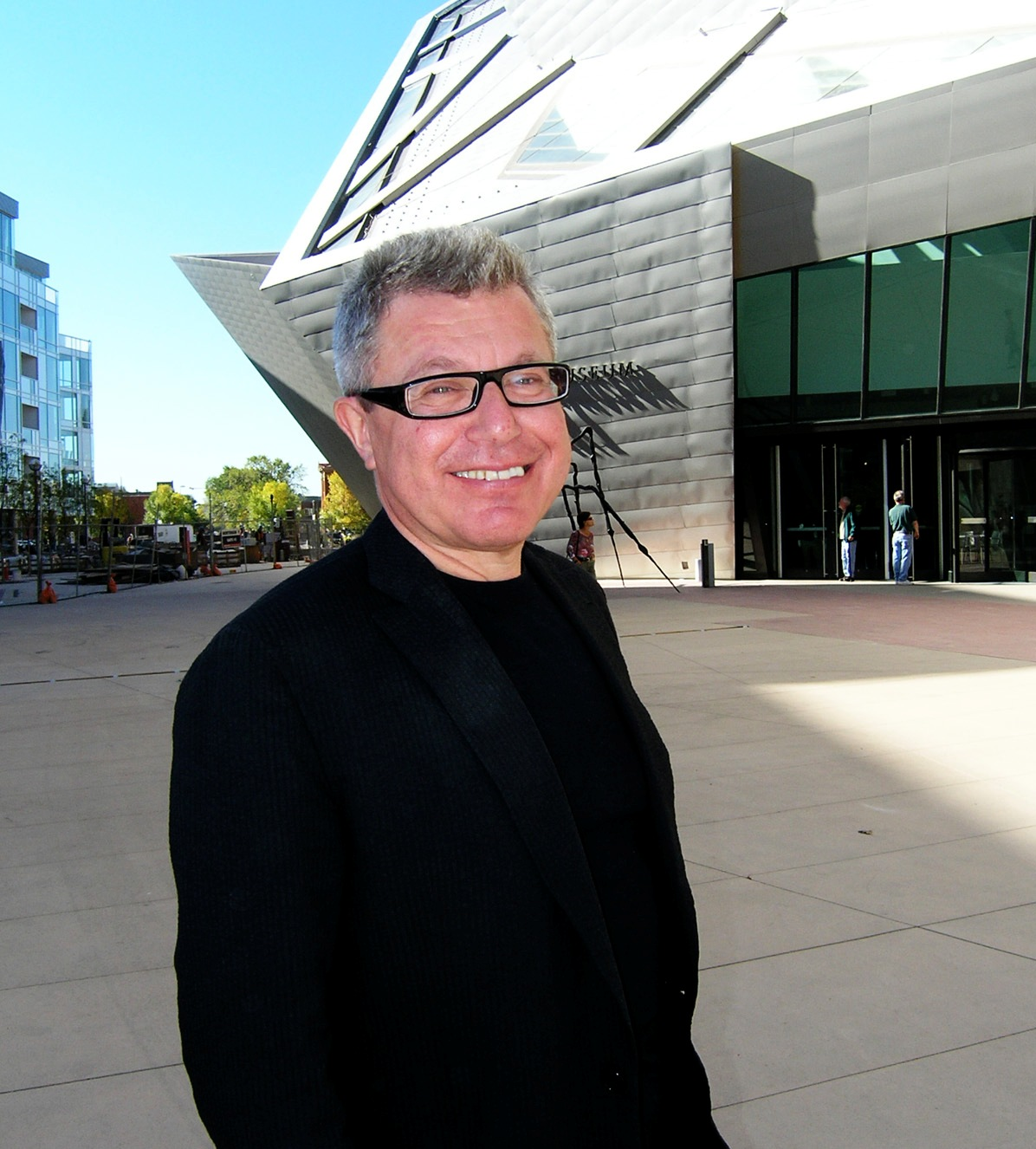
Daniel Libeskind

- Daniel Libeskind - architect of the Freedom Tower and Memory Foundations on the site of the World Trade Center in New York City

=== Philosophy ===
- Simon Critchley - British philosopher, academic at the New School for Social Research
- William McNeill - British philosopher, academic at DePaul University

=== Literary figures and artists ===
- Kee Thuan Chye - Malaysian dramatist, poet and journalist
- Charlie Connelly - author and broadcaster
- Nick Dear - writer for stage, screen and radio
- Mark Felton - author and historian
- Fraser Harrison - English writer
- Nigel Jenkins - Welsh poet and writer
- John Lawton – novelist
- Marianne Majerus - photographer
- Okello Oculi - Ugandan novelist and poet
- Ben Okri - Booker Prize winner
- Douglas Oliver - English contemporary poet and novelist
- Soledad Reyes - Filipino literary scholar and critic
- Kate Rhodes - British poet
- Mike Ripley – novelist
- Michelene Wandor - English playwright and poet
- Nathan Zach - Israeli poet
- The Kipper Kids - Performance Artists (at East 15 Acting School)

=== Science and technology ===
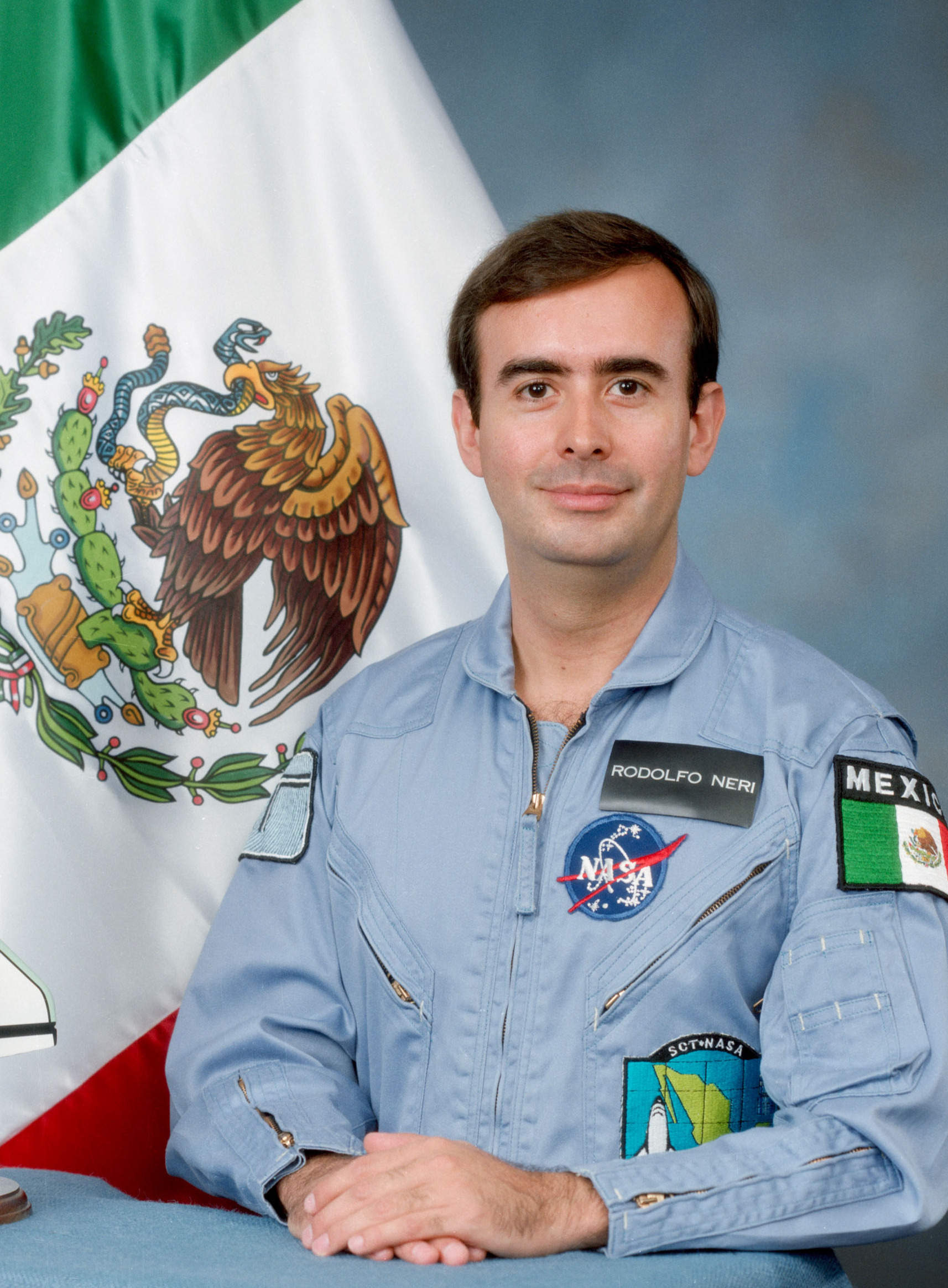
Rodolfo Neri Vela

- Richard Bartle - co-creator of MUD1, the first ever MUD (Multi-User Dungeon)
- Phil O'Donovan - Bluetooth engineer & CSR plc co-founder
- Nigel Roberts - Internet naming pioneer, Board Director at ICANN
- Roy Trubshaw - co-creator of MUD1, the first ever MUD (Multi-User Dungeon)
- Rodolfo Neri Vela - Mexico's first astronaut

=== Human rights ===
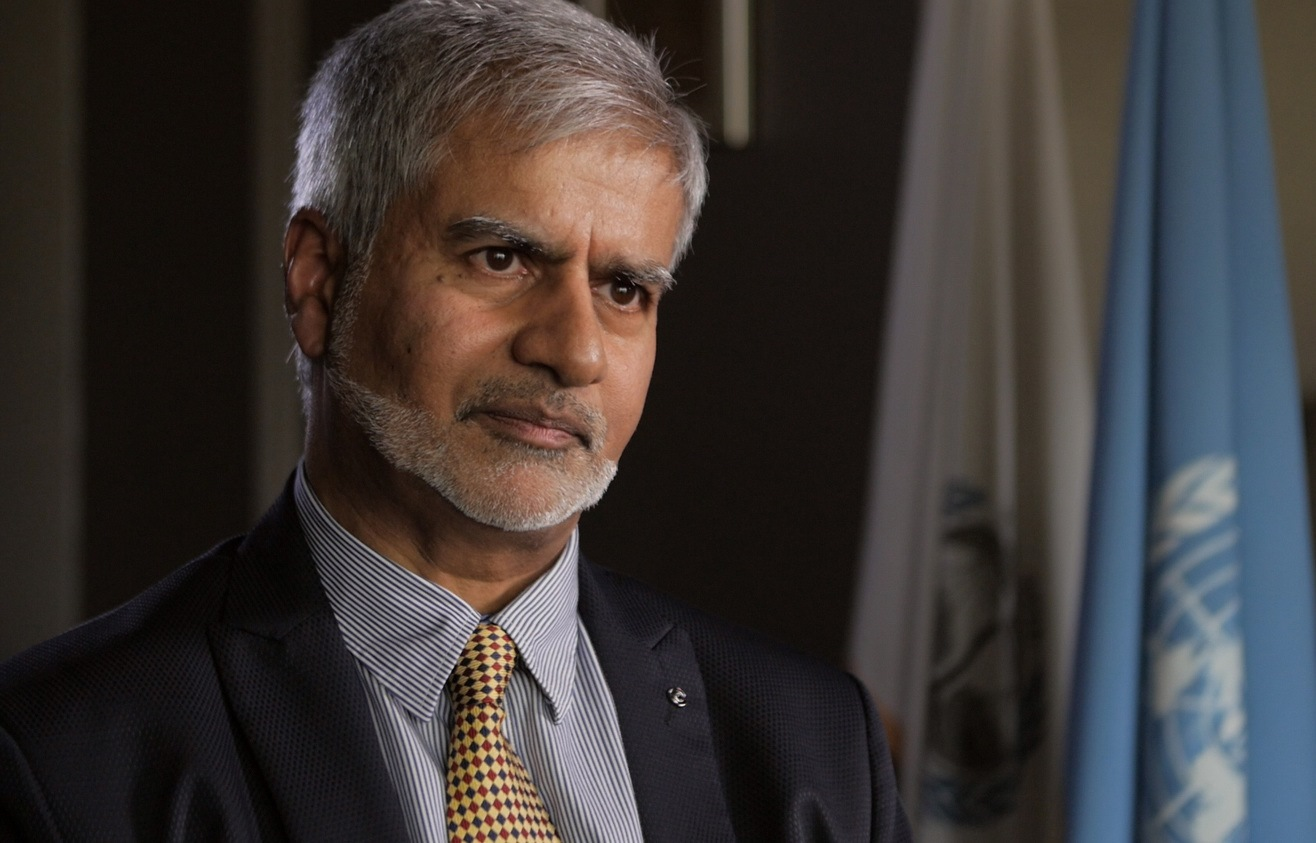
Lyal S Sunga at ICTR Arusha Tanzania 1 Dec 2015

- Akram H. Chowdhury - founder of the Bangladesh Rehabilitation Centre for Trauma Victims
- Alex Neve - Secretary General of Amnesty International Canada
- Carry Somers - Founder and Global Operations Director of Fashion Revolution UK
