= Coleraine Area B =

District electoral areas in Coleraine, Northern Ireland

Coleraine Area B was one of the three district electoral areas in Coleraine, Northern Ireland which existed from 1973 to 1985. The district elected seven members to Coleraine Borough Council, and formed part of the Londonderry constituencies for the Northern Ireland Assembly and UK Parliament.

It was created for the 1973 local elections, and contained the wards of Ballywillin, Dhu Vallen, Dunluce, Knockantern, Portrush, Portstewart and Strand. It was abolished for the 1985 local elections and replaced by The Skerries DEA.

== Councillors ==
Election	Councillor (Party)	Councillor (Party)	Councillor (Party)	Councillor (Party)	Councillor (Party)	Councillor (Party)	Councillor (Party)
1981	William Creelman (DUP)	Matthew Kane (DUP)	William Glenn (UUP)	Albert Clarke (UUP)	Elizabeth Connolly (UUP)	Robert Mitchell (UUP)	Patrick McGowan (Alliance)
1977	Sean Farren (SDLP)	Alexander Sharpe (Independent Unionist)/ (UUP)	William Glenn (UUP)	Albert Clarke (UUP)	Robert Stafford (UUP)	John Earl (UUP)	Thomas Wilson (Alliance)
1973	J. Fawcett (Alliance)	Alexander Sharpe (Independent Unionist)/ (UUP)	William Glenn (UUP)	Albert Clarke (UUP)	Robert Stafford (UUP)	John Earl (UUP)	Thomas Wilson (Alliance)

== 1981 Election ==
1977: 4 x UUP, 1 x Alliance, 1 x SDLP, 1 x Independent Unionist

1981: 4 x UUP, 2 x DUP, 1 x Alliance

1977-1981 Change: DUP (two seats) gain from SDLP and Independent Unionist

Coleraine Area B - 7 seats
Party	Candidate	FPv%	Count									
Party	Candidate	FPv%	1	2	3	4	5	6	7	8	9	10
DUP	William Creelman	17.09%	1,119									
UUP	William Glenn*	10.29%	674	692.2	695.2	809.72	810.72	819.28				
UUP	Albert Clarke*	9.62%	630	637.54	638.54	683.32	697.32	713.1	877.1			
DUP	Matthew Kane	8.25%	540	611.76	614.76	621.02	624.02	777.64	790.16	791.27	1,105.27	
UUP	Elizabeth Connolly	6.46%	423	425.6	425.6	508.6	517.6	562.16	630.24	666.13	735.82	808.82
Alliance	Patrick McGowan	6.92%	453	453.78	466.78	468.3	730.3	731.3	754.08	755.93	761.64	764.64
UUP	Robert Mitchell	7.53%	493	494.82	494.82	508.6	519.6	531.86	583.9	599.07	636.44	718.44
SDLP	Sean Farren*	10.05%	658	658.52	669.52	669.52	673.52	674.78	678.56	678.93	679.56	679.56
DUP	Roy Hilldrup	4.15%	272	423.58	426.84	432.4	435.4	520.42	535.5	537.72		
UUP	John Earl*	5.08%	333	341.32	341.32	351.58	356.58	357.84				
DUP	William Sweeney	4.72%	309	331.36	332.36	334.36	335.36					
Alliance	Peter Scott	4.47%	293	293	311	316						
UUP	Thomas Henry	4.44%	291	295.68	295.68							
Green (NI)	Malcolm Samuel	0.93%	61	61.26								
Electorate: 10,492 Valid: 6,549 (62.42%) Spoilt: 166 Quota: 819 Turnout: 6,715 (64.00%)

== 1977 Election ==
1973: 5 x UUP, 2 x Alliance

1977: 4 x UUP, 1 x Alliance, 1 x SDLP, 1 x Independent Unionist

1973-1977 Change: SDLP gain from Alliance, Independent Unionist leaves UUP

Coleraine Area B - 7 seats
Party	Candidate	FPv%	Count						
Party	Candidate	FPv%	1	2	3	4	5	6	7
UUP	William Glenn*	13.62%	725						
UUP	Albert Clarke*	12.55%	668						
Alliance	Thomas Wilson*	8.25%	439	507	521	522.68	828.68		
UUP	Robert Stafford*	10.60%	564	566	567	578.2	580.2	585.73	736.73
Ind. Unionist	Alexander Sharpe*	11.63%	619	619	619	624.44	626.52	654.96	697.96
UUP	John Earl*	8.55%	455	455	459	478.76	493.76	527.73	671.39
SDLP	Sean Farren	6.74%	359	377	595	595.08	612.08	678.44	678.44
Vanguard	Antony Alcock	8.00%	426	428	428	433.52	436.52	452.32	498.8
UUP	Robert Mitchell	7.04%	375	376	376	389.04	394.12	402.81	
Alliance	Donald Batts	5.32%	283	348	355	355.48			
SDLP	Hugh McIlvenna	4.45%	237	251					
Alliance	Patrick McGowan	3.25%	173						
Electorate: 10,461 Valid: 5,323 (50.88%) Spoilt: 229 Quota: 666 Turnout: 5,552 (53.07%)

== 1973 Election ==
1973: 5 x UUP, 2 x Alliance

Coleraine Area B - 7 seats
Party	Candidate	FPv%	Count									
Party	Candidate	FPv%	1	2	3	4	5	6	7	8	9	10
UUP	Albert Clarke	15.94%	1,163									
UUP	Alexander Sharpe	11.01%	803	824.84	830.84	910.85	914.75					
Alliance	J. Fawcett	8.39%	612	623.34	627.55	651.39	747.44	755.65	889.07	1,048.07		
UUP	John Earl	8.72%	636	716.85	720.9	750.58	757.42	795.2	805.62	815.62	817.62	959.62
UUP	William Glenn	9.06%	661	685.99	687.99	698.07	708.49	761.27	777.27	779.27	779.27	954.27
UUP	Robert Stafford	11.10%	810	821.13	828.13	832.91	839.59	851.06	862.48	865.69	867.69	939.69
Alliance	Thomas Wilson	5.59%	408	409.89	414.89	417.1	468.52	468.52	639.73	786.73	910.73	933.73
Loyalist	Hagan	4.46%	325	330.46	365.3	372.3	372.51	559.19	563.19	565.4	565.4	615.4
UUP	T. D. McVeigh	5.41%	395	401.51	403.51	435.98	443.98	468.61	479.61	480.61	480.61	
SDLP	Isobel Boylan	5.32%	388	388.21	388.21	392.21	396.21	396.42	401.42			
Alliance	R. J. Smyth	4.10%	299	300.05	301.05	306.05	362.69	369.1				
Independent	C. Dunlop	3.62%	264	274.92	345.76	354.81	355.81					
Alliance	J. Hamill	3.19%	233	237.2	241.2	247.62						
UUP	Katherine McConaghy	2.14%	156	214.38	219.01							
Independent	J. A. Taggart	1.88%	137	140.15								
Independent	G. Woods	0.01%	5	5.42								
Electorate: 10,508 Valid: 7,295 (69.42%) Spoilt: 74 Quota: 912 Turnout: 7,369 (70.13%)
