= 1981 Coleraine Borough Council election =

Local government election in Northern Ireland

← 1977	20 May 1981	1985 →

All 20 seats to Coleraine Borough Council 11 seats needed for a majority
	First party	Second party	Third party
Party	UUP	DUP	Independent
Seats won	8	6	3
Seat change	▼2	▲4	0
	Fourth party	Fifth party	Sixth party
Party	SDLP	Alliance	Ind. Unionist
Seats won	2	1	0
Seat change	0	▼1	▼1

Elections to Coleraine Borough Council were held on 20 May 1981 on the same day as the other Northern Irish local government elections. The election used three district electoral areas to elect a total of 20 councillors.

== Election results ==
Coleraine Borough Council Election Result 1981
Party	Seats	Gains	Losses	Net gain/loss	Seats %	Votes %	Votes	+/−
UUP	8	0	2	▼2	40.0	34.2	7,670	▼4.0
DUP	6	4	0	▲4	30.0	33.2	7,440	▲15.6
Independent	3	1	1	0	15.0	10.8	2,421	▼3.8
SDLP	2	1	1	0	10.0	11.7	2,620	▲1.2
Alliance	1	0	1	▼1	5.0	6.3	1,417	▼4.3
Ind. Unionist	0	0	1	▼1	0.0	3.1	705	▼0.3
Green (NI)	0	0	0	0	0.0	0.6	142	New

Note: "Votes" are the first preference votes.

== Districts summary ==
Results of the Coleraine Borough Council election, 1981 by district
Ward	%	Cllrs	%	Cllrs	%	Cllrs	%	Cllrs	%	Cllrs	Total Cllrs
Ward	UUP		DUP		SDLP		Alliance		Others		Total Cllrs
Area A	34.2	2	26.1	2	28.0	2	1.7	0	10.0	0	6
Area B	43.4	4	34.2	2	10.0	0	11.4	1	1.0	0	7
Area C	27.4	2	38.1	2	0.0	0	6.3	0	28.2	3	7
Total	34.2	8	33.2	6	11.7	2	6.3	1	14.6	3	20

== Districts results ==
=== Area A ===
1977: 3 x UUP, 1 x DUP, 1 x SDLP, 1 x Independent Unionist
1981: 2 x UUP, 2 x DUP, 2 x SDLP
1977-1981 Change: DUP and SDLP gain from UUP and Independent Unionist

Coleraine Area A - 6 seats
Party	Candidate	FPv%	Count							
Party	Candidate	FPv%	1	2	3	4	5	6	7	8
SDLP	John Dallat*	15.14%	1,061							
SDLP	Gerard O'Kane	12.86%	901	925	975.7					
UUP	William King*	12.33%	864	883	883.1	890.15	943.15	1,235.15		
UUP	George McIlrath*	9.85%	690	702	702.25	712.25	910.25	1,058.25		
DUP	Thomas Malone	11.17%	783	784	784	983	992	1,026		
DUP	Robert Catherwood*	9.70%	680	682	682	802	827	888	969	998.68
Ind. Unionist	William Watt*	10.06%	705	725	725.65	745.65	773.65	788.65	898.65	924.41
UUP	James Anderson*	6.36%	446	460	460	464	562			
UUP	Mayne Long	5.64%	395	405	405	413				
DUP	Irwin Holmes	5.22%	366	368	368.1					
Alliance	Anne Lambert	1.67%	117							
Electorate: 8,960 Valid: 7,008 (78.21%) Spoilt: 179 Quota: 1,002 Turnout: 7,187 (80.21%)

=== Area B ===
1977: 4 x UUP, 1 x Alliance, 1 x SDLP, 1 x Independent Unionist
1981: 4 x UUP, 2 x DUP, 1 x Alliance
1977-1981 Change: DUP (two seats) gain from SDLP and Independent Unionist

Coleraine Area B - 7 seats
Party	Candidate	FPv%	Count									
Party	Candidate	FPv%	1	2	3	4	5	6	7	8	9	10
DUP	William Creelman	17.09%	1,119									
UUP	William Glenn*	10.29%	674	692.2	695.2	809.72	810.72	819.28				
UUP	Albert Clarke*	9.62%	630	637.54	638.54	683.32	697.32	713.1	877.1			
DUP	Matthew Kane	8.25%	540	611.76	614.76	621.02	624.02	777.64	790.16	791.27	1,105.27	
UUP	Elizabeth Connolly	6.46%	423	425.6	425.6	508.6	517.6	562.16	630.24	666.13	735.82	808.82
Alliance	Patrick McGowan	6.92%	453	453.78	466.78	468.3	730.3	731.3	754.08	755.93	761.64	764.64
UUP	Robert Mitchell	7.53%	493	494.82	494.82	508.6	519.6	531.86	583.9	599.07	636.44	718.44
SDLP	Sean Farren*	10.05%	658	658.52	669.52	669.52	673.52	674.78	678.56	678.93	679.56	679.56
DUP	Roy Hilldrup	4.15%	272	423.58	426.84	432.4	435.4	520.42	535.5	537.72		
UUP	John Earl*	5.08%	333	341.32	341.32	351.58	356.58	357.84				
DUP	William Sweeney	4.72%	309	331.36	332.36	334.36	335.36					
Alliance	Peter Scott	4.47%	293	293	311	316						
UUP	Thomas Henry	4.44%	291	295.68	295.68							
Green (NI)	Malcolm Samuel	0.93%	61	61.26								
Electorate: 10,492 Valid: 6,549 (62.42%) Spoilt: 166 Quota: 819 Turnout: 6,715 (64.00%)

=== Area C ===
1977: 3 x UUP, 2 x Independent, 1 x DUP, 1 x Alliance
1981: 3 x Independent, 2 x DUP, 2 x UUP
1977-1981 Change: DUP and Independent gain from UUP and Alliance

Coleraine Area C - 7 seats
Party	Candidate	FPv%	Count									
Party	Candidate	FPv%	1	2	3	4	5	6	7	8	9	10
DUP	James McClure*	36.16%	3,203									
UUP	Robert White*	15.51%	1,374									
Independent	James McFeely*	13.25%	1,174									
UUP	Paul Baxter	6.94%	615	800.46	863.35	864.13	872.8	959.61	979.83	1,186.83		
Independent	William McNabb	8.42%	746	909.02	935.24	953.72	968.95	1,007.37	1,018.35	1,096.82	1,116.82	
Independent	Randall Crawford*	5.28%	468	627.72	652.23	658.77	664.87	686.75	707.44	798.61	815.66	1,086.08
DUP	Robert Bolton	0.78%	69	634.62	637.85	637.85	637.85	643.55	781.35	824.6	847.15	873.36
DUP	Robert McElfatrick	0.68%	60	588.66	591.32	591.5	594.48	601.63	729.34	764.44	773.79	794.16
Alliance	William Mathews*	5.64%	500	525.08	545.6	571.34	573.84	663.43	667.94	700.07	709.42	
UUP	Matthew Adams*	4.01%	355	469.84	537.29	538.01	541.2	573.36	581.32			
DUP	Elizabeth Gaston	0.44%	39	328.08	329.22	329.4	329.4	336.61				
UUP	Antony Alcock	0.54%	48	58.56	90.86	90.86	90.86					
Green (NI)	Avril McCandless	0.91%	81	84.3	84.49	86.77	88.89					
UUP	Robert Hunter	0.44%	39	56.82	67.65	67.71	68.77					
Alliance	Margaret Smith	0.61%	54	57.3	58.63	59.95	62.01					
Independent	James Leonard	0.37%	33	43.56	45.46	47.8						
Electorate: 12,636 Valid: 8,858 (70.10%) Spoilt: 215 Quota: 1,108 Turnout: 9,073 (71.80%)
