= Hanif Lalani =

British business executive and finance ambassador to Northern Ireland

- Born: 1962 (age 63–64); Uganda
- Occupation: Business executive
- Years active: 1983–present
- Known for: Investment ambassador for Northern Ireland

Hanif Mohamed Lalani (born 1962) is a British business executive and finance ambassador to Northern Ireland. Born in Uganda, he moved to the United Kingdom aged 10, and joined BT Group in 1983 as a graduate trainee. He moved to Northern Ireland in 1998 to become finance director of BT Northern Ireland, and a year later was made CEO of the division. After various other roles, he joined in the BT board as finance director in February 2005. In 2007, the Confederation of British Industry named him finance director. On 31 October 2008 he became CEO of BT Global Services. He resigned in January 2010, replaced by Jeff Kelly. In August 2010, he was appointed the first investment ambassador for Northern Ireland.

In 2007, the Institute of Asian Professionals named him in its Muslim Power 100 list, at #30 for his work as finance director of BT.

Lalani's OBE, awarded to him in December 2002, was removed by Her Majesty the Queen in September 2020 in connection with insider trading fraud committed in 2007.

== See also ==
- List of University of Essex people
