= Coleraine Area C =

District electoral areas in Coleraine, Northern Ireland

Coleraine Area C was one of the three district electoral areas in Coleraine, Northern Ireland which existed from 1973 to 1985. The district elected seven members to Coleraine Borough Council, and formed part of the Londonderry constituencies for the Northern Ireland Assembly and UK Parliament.

It was created for the 1973 local elections, and contained the wards of Central, Churchland, Cross Glebe, Mount Sandel, The Cuts, university and Waterside. It was abolished for the 1985 local elections and replaced by Coleraine Town DEA.

== Councillors ==
Election	Councillor (Party)	Councillor (Party)	Councillor (Party)	Councillor (Party)	Councillor (Party)	Councillor (Party)	Councillor (Party)
1981	James McClure (DUP)	Robert Bolton (DUP)	Robert White (UUP)	Paul Baxter (UUP)	William McNabb (Independent)	Randall Crawford (Independent)	James McFeely (Independent)
1977	James McClure (DUP)	Matthew Adams (UUP)	Robert White (UUP)	Victor Hanson (UUP)	William Mathews (Alliance)	Randall Crawford (Independent)	James McFeely (Independent)
1973	James Edwards (UUP)	Matthew Adams (UUP)	Robert White (UUP)	I. Wilson (UUP)	William Mathews (Alliance)	Randall Crawford (Independent)	James McFeely (Independent)

== 1981 Election ==
1977: 3 x UUP, 2 x Independent, 1 x DUP, 1 x Alliance

1981: 3 x Independent, 2 x DUP, 2 x UUP

1977-1981 Change: DUP and Independent gain from UUP and Alliance

Coleraine Area C - 7 seats
Party	Candidate	FPv%	Count									
Party	Candidate	FPv%	1	2	3	4	5	6	7	8	9	10
DUP	James McClure*	36.16%	3,203									
UUP	Robert White*	15.51%	1,374									
Independent	James McFeely*	13.25%	1,174									
UUP	Paul Baxter	6.94%	615	800.46	863.35	864.13	872.8	959.61	979.83	1,186.83		
Independent	William McNabb	8.42%	746	909.02	935.24	953.72	968.95	1,007.37	1,018.35	1,096.82	1,116.82	
Independent	Randall Crawford*	5.28%	468	627.72	652.23	658.77	664.87	686.75	707.44	798.61	815.66	1,086.08
DUP	Robert Bolton	0.78%	69	634.62	637.85	637.85	637.85	643.55	781.35	824.6	847.15	873.36
DUP	Robert McElfatrick	0.68%	60	588.66	591.32	591.5	594.48	601.63	729.34	764.44	773.79	794.16
Alliance	William Mathews*	5.64%	500	525.08	545.6	571.34	573.84	663.43	667.94	700.07	709.42	
UUP	Matthew Adams*	4.01%	355	469.84	537.29	538.01	541.2	573.36	581.32			
DUP	Elizabeth Gaston	0.44%	39	328.08	329.22	329.4	329.4	336.61				
UUP	Antony Alcock	0.54%	48	58.56	90.86	90.86	90.86					
Green (NI)	Avril McCandless	0.91%	81	84.3	84.49	86.77	88.89					
UUP	Robert Hunter	0.44%	39	56.82	67.65	67.71	68.77					
Alliance	Margaret Smith	0.61%	54	57.3	58.63	59.95	62.01					
Independent	James Leonard	0.37%	33	43.56	45.46	47.8						
Electorate: 12,636 Valid: 8,858 (70.10%) Spoilt: 215 Quota: 1,108 Turnout: 9,073 (71.80%)

== 1977 Election ==
1973: 4 x UUP, 2 x Independent, 1 x Alliance

1977: 3 x UUP, 2 x Independent, 1 x DUP, 1 x Alliance

1973-1977 Change: DUP gain from UUP

Coleraine Area C - 7 seats
Party	Candidate	FPv%	Count															
Party	Candidate	FPv%	1	2	3	4	5	6	7	8	9	10	11	12	13	14	15	16
DUP	James McClure	30.40%	2,111															
Independent	James McFeely*	13.12%	911															
UUP	Robert White*	11.13%	773	968.62														
Independent	Randall Crawford*	8.94%	621	922.32														
UUP	Matthew Adams*	7.53%	523	690.4	703.9	714.58	714.82	721.28	724.14	737.59	778.54	812.82	874.26					
Alliance	William Mathews*	7.86%	546	560.88	561.38	562.46	570.34	570.96	572	573.66	577.28	579.36	651.47	694.95	890.95			
UUP	Victor Hanson	2.72%	189	267.12	281.37	286.89	287.37	288.49	290.61	296.34	321.75	332.09	369.36	387.66	391.42	394.94	466.45	604.14
Independent	William McNabb	2.97%	206	299	301.25	306.89	309.33	314.55	322.55	332.88	338.48	357.08	375.06	411.18	430.74	444.18	490.11	546.1
UUP	John Millar	2.23%	155	208.32	214.32	218.04	218.28	220.15	221.15	332.88	338.48	357.08	375.06	411.18	430.74	444.18	490.11	
Vanguard	Adrian Eakin	1.31%	91	255.92	261.17	273.65	273.65	276.39	277.39	284.15	289.85	293.82	301.41	309.27	309.35	309.67		
Alliance	Francis Trainor	3.23%	224	226.48	226.73	226.85	244.05	245.17	245.25	248.57	249.61	250.89	258.93	279.05				
Independent	Henry McCormick	1.73%	120	171.46	172.21	174.25	177.93	178.05	184.05	193.21	198.07	250.67	253.54					
Ind. Unionist	James Edwards*	2.92%	203	221.6	226.1	227.42	227.54	228.91	234.03	237.65	240.01	250.5						
Independent	Samuel Walker	1.22%	85	120.96	122.96	124.88	125.48	137.4	146.12	160.88	164.24							
UUP	Charles Graham	1.01%	70	109.68	115.93	119.53	119.61	120.23	122.13	124.37								
Independent	Frederick Millar	0.69%	48	73.42	74.67	76.23	76.71	79.37	92.64									
Independent	Samuel Oliver	0.55%	38	46.06	47.06	48.14	48.34	57.82										
Independent	Howard Platt	0.43%	30	44.88	45.38	47.54	47.82											
Electorate: 11,649 Valid: 6,944 (59.61%) Spoilt: 253 Quota: 869 Turnout: 7,197 (61.78%)

== 1973 Election ==
1973: 4 x UUP, 2 x Independent, 1 x Alliance

Coleraine Area C - 7 seats
Party	Candidate	FPv%	Count																
Party	Candidate	FPv%	1	2	3	4	5	6	7	8	9	10	11	12	13	14	15	16	17
UUP	Robert White	16.73%	1,269																
UUP	James Edwards	16.03%	1,216																
UUP	Matthew Adams	14.66%	1,112																
Independent	James McFeely	9.58%	727	733.75	735.51	738.17	740.17	746.62	769.56	848.7	852.09	927.34	934.26	962.26					
Alliance	William Mathews	5.75%	436	450.25	466.75	470.53	470.53	539.35	540.74	543.74	543.99	640.93	645.59	727.45	730.3	748.19	1,017.19		
UUP	I. Wilson	4.13%	313	476	597.88	617.76	618.4	624.34	633.48	633.48	641.35	646.82	688.52	706.03	706.6	786.61	796.93	822.13	1,065.13
Independent	Randall Crawford	5.10%	387	402.5	407.78	422.06	435.31	436.31	496.72	496.72	628.96	628.96	674.81	694.76	695.9	753.63	754.1	758.3	803.81
Independent	J. Doherty	4.27%	324	335.5	339.8	359.92	362.06	365.31	369.92	373.92	384.12	386.12	400.55	428.8	429.94	501.06	514.45	545.65	609.49
UUP	J. Hamill	2.66%	202	251	330.2	349.94	356.44	358.91	364.47	364.47	369	370.5	450.21	463.12	463.69	515.54	520.21	526.81	
Alliance	W. E. O'Hara	3.11%	236	239.5	242.14	242.28	242.28	253.53	253.53	258.67	260.67	303.67	303.67	327.06	333.9	337.34			
Independent	S. J. Walker	3.05%	231	245.5	256.06	267.54	271.82	274.21	279.46	279.46	287.1	289.32	310.23	331.25	331.25				
NI Labour	R. E. Adams	2.64%	200	204	210.16	214.5	214.5	217.64	220.78	236.78	243.06	249.06	249.89						
UUP	R. H. S. Edmundson	1.85%	140	158.5	169.94	211.38	213.66	214.13	226.55	226.55	238.34	239.62							
Alliance	Eileen Farrell	2.73%	207	208	209.1	209.66	209.66	218.66	219.8	233.8	234.8								
Independent	J. Anderson	1.70%	129	132.5	133.16	142.4	155.79	158.04	196.62	196.62									
Republican Clubs	J. A. Fleming	2.14%	162	162	162	162.14	162.14	162.14	162.28										
Independent	A. Eakin	1.58%	120	122.75	124.73	127.95	148	148.34											
Alliance	Hamilton	1.46%	111	115	117.42	117.98	117.98												
Independent	K. Ferguson	0.84%	64	66.25	66.69	68.09													
Electorate: 10,886 Valid: 7,586 (69.69%) Spoilt: 108 Quota: 949 Turnout: 7,694 (70.68%)
