= John Shelley (illustrator) =

British illustrator

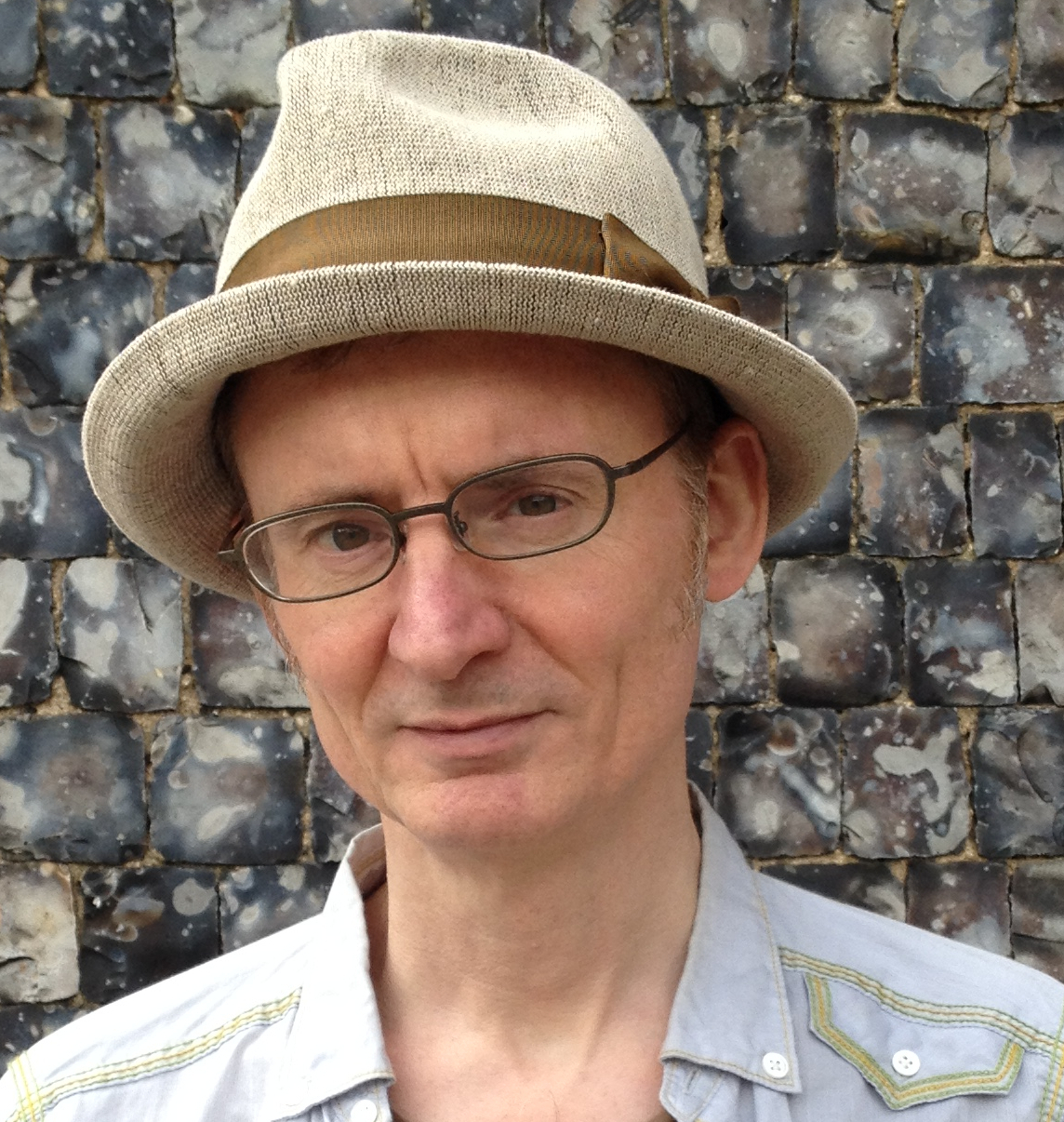
- British illustrator John Shelley
- Born: 1959 (age 66–67); Birmingham, Warwickshire, England
- Known for: Illustration, children's literature
- Website: www.johnshelley.com

John Shelley (ジョン・シェリー) is a British illustrator, particularly noted for his work in Japan.

== Career ==
John Shelley (born 1959) grew up in Sutton Coldfield before studying illustration at Bournville School of Art and Manchester Polytechnic under Tony Ross. His first children's trade picture book The Secret in the Matchbox published by André Deutsch and Farrar, Straus and Giroux was shortlisted for the Mother Goose Award in the UK and won a Parents' Choice Award in the US in 1989.

From 1987–2008, he lived in Tokyo, rising to prominence following a series of posters for Parco, the fashion retail chain of Seibu Department Stores, and animated TV commercials for Mitsubishi Estate Co. From 2000–2007, he was Vice Chairman of the International Committee of the Japan Graphic Designers Association JAGDA.

=== Children's books ===
He has illustrated children's books for all age groups through publishers in the UK, Japan and the US, and has self-authored picture books published in Japan. He is a former Board member of the Society of Children's Book Writers and Illustrators and has been a multiple time nominee for the Astrid Lindgren Memorial Award.

In 2002 the comic character "Brat" was launched in Japan on apparel, collectors figurines and a web comic.

Shelley returned to the UK in 2008 following the death of his wife, and currently lives in Norfolk.

== Bibliography ==
- 1982 Fatbag author: Jeremy Strong (A & C Black, UK)
- 1983 Get Lavinia Goodbody author: Roger Collinson (Andersen Press, UK) (Alfaguara, Spain)
- 1984 A Canoe in the Mist author: Elsie Locke (Jonathan Cape, UK)
- 1985 Night Eyes author: Peter Ward (Crystal Clear, UK)
- 1986 Japanese Vegetarian Cookery author: Lesley Downer (Jonathan Cape, UK)
- 1989 The Secret in the Matchbox author: Val Willis (Andre Deutsch UK / Farrar Straus & Giroux US)
- 1989 Santa ni Yoroshiku author: John Shelley (Parco Shuppan, Japan)
- 1990 The Surprise in the Wardrobe author: Val Willis (Scholastic UK / Farrar Straus & Giroux US)
- 1990 Peer Gynt author: Henrik Ibsen (condensed adaptation by Hiroshi Kawasaki) (Hyoronsha, Japan)
- 1991 The Mystery in the Bottle author: Val Willis (Scholastic UK / Farrar Straus & Giroux US)
- 1991 Ju -ni no Tsukitachi (The Month Brothers) trans: Sho Suzuki (Miki House, Japan)
- 1991 Ai o Uranau Sabian Astrology author:Kiyoshi Matsumura (Fun House Books, Japan)
- 1994 A Father's Diary author: Fraser Harrison (Media Factory, Japan)
- 1994 Shikake E-Hon series (3 volumes) author: John Shelley (Hikari no Kuni, Japan)
- 1995 Hoppy no Atarashii Uchi (Hoppy's New House) author: John Shelley (Fukuinkan Shoten, Japan)
- 1996 Cinderella trad., adapted by Misako Nakamura (Hikari no Kuni, Japan)
- 1999 Maho no Kasa (The Magic Umberella) author: Rose Fyleman (Fukuinkan Shoten, Japan)
- 2002 King Smelly Feet author: Hiawyn Oram (Andersen Press, UK / Uitgeverij Sjaloom, Netherlands)
- 2002 Tinpot Tales author: John Shelley (Artbox, Japan)
- 2003 Hawaiian Big Daddy author: Banbis Snowflower (Nikkei BP, Japan)
- 2004 MVP author: Douglas Evans (Front Street, US)
- 2004 The Deptford Mice (3 volumes) author: Robin Jarvis (Hayakawa Shobo, Japan)
- 2005 Anata no Shiranai Andersen series (4 volumes) author: Hans Christian Andersen (Hyoronsha, Japan)
- 2005 Sekai Isshu Ohanashi no Ryo (Stories from Around the World) Ed. Linda Jennings, Trans. Rika Nogi (PHP, Japan)
- 2005 Bella Baxter series (4 volumes) author: Jane B. Mason / Sarah Hines Stephens (Aladdin, US)
- 2005 I Wish I Could be a Ballerina author: Rosie McCormick (Inky Press, UK/ Backpack Books, US)
- 2005 Mighty Mike author: Pascal-Auban Scher (Aeon, Japan)
- 2006 Charlie Bone Children of the Red King Series (5 volumes) author: Jenny Nimmo (Tokuma Shoten, Japan)
- 2006 The Magic Train Ride author: Pascal-Auban Scher (Aeon, Japan)
- 2007 The Boat in the Tree author: Tim Wynne-Jones (Front Street, US)
- 2007 The Elves and the Shoemaker author: Brothers Grimm (Fukuinkan Shoten, Japan)
- 2008 The House of the World author: John Shelley (Benesse, Japan)
- 2008 Zipper-kun to Chaku no Maho author: Machiko Hayakawa (Rironsha, Japan)
- 2009 Family Reminders author: Julie Danneberg (Charlesbridge, US)
- 2010 Nasty author: Michael Rosen (Barn Owl, UK)
- 2010 Outside-In author: Clare Smallman (Frances Lincoln, UK)
- 2012 Jack to Mame no Ki (Jack and the Beanstalk) author: John Shelley (Fukuinkan Shoten, Japan)
- 2012 Halloween Forest author: Marion Dane Bauer (Holiday House, US)
- 2013 Ishi no Kyojin author: Jane Sutcliffe (Komine Shoten, Japan)
- 2014 Stone Giant: Michelangelo's David and How He Came To Be author: Jane Sutcliffe (Charlesbridge, US)
- 2015 Crinkle, Crackle, Crack author: Marion Dane Bauer (Holiday House, US)
- 2016 Will's Words: How William Shakespeare Changed the Way You Talk author: Jane Sutcliffe (Charlesbridge, US)
- 2016 Yozora o Miageyo author: Yuriko Matsumura (Fukuinkan Shoten, Japan)
- 2016 The Life and Adventures of Santa Claus author: L. Frank Baum (Hesperus, UK)
- 2017 Magic For Sale author: Carrie Clickard (Holiday House, US)
- 2019 A Purse Full of Tales: Folk Tales from Korea author: Chan Young Kim, David Carter (Hesperus, UK)
- 2020 The Boy in the Jam Jar author: Joyce Dunbar (Bloomsbury, UK)
