= Coleraine Area A =

District electoral areas in Coleraine, Northern Ireland

Coleraine Area A was one of the three district electoral areas in Coleraine, Northern Ireland which existed from 1973 to 1985. The district elected six members to Coleraine Borough Council, and formed part of the Londonderry constituencies for the Northern Ireland Assembly and UK Parliament.

It was created for the 1973 local elections, and contained the wards of Agivey, Castlerock, Garvagh, Kilrea, Macosquin and Ringsend. It was abolished for the 1985 local elections and replaced by the Bann DEA.

== Councillors ==
Election	Councillor (Party)	Councillor (Party)	Councillor (Party)	Councillor (Party)	Councillor (Party)	Councillor (Party)
1981	Robert Catherwood (DUP)	Thomas Malone (DUP)	William King (UUP)	George McIlrath (UUP)	Gerard O'Kane (SDLP)	John Dallat (SDLP)
1977	Robert Catherwood (DUP)	James Anderson (UUP)	William King (UUP)	George McIlrath (UUP)	William Watt (Independent Unionist)	John Dallat (SDLP)
1973	Leslie Morrell (UUP)	James Anderson (UUP)	Robert McMaster (UUP)	J. H. McElfatrick (UUP)	William Watt (Independent Unionist)	Patrick Cassidy (SDLP)

== 1981 Election ==
1977: 3 x UUP, 1 x DUP, 1 x SDLP, 1 x Independent Unionist

1981: 2 x UUP, 2 x DUP, 2 x SDLP

1977-1981 Change: DUP and SDLP gain from UUP and Independent Unionist

Coleraine Area A - 6 seats
Party	Candidate	FPv%	Count							
Party	Candidate	FPv%	1	2	3	4	5	6	7	8
SDLP	John Dallat*	15.14%	1,061							
SDLP	Gerard O'Kane	12.86%	901	925	975.7					
UUP	William King*	12.33%	864	883	883.1	890.15	943.15	1,235.15		
UUP	George McIlrath*	9.85%	690	702	702.25	712.25	910.25	1,058.25		
DUP	Thomas Malone	11.17%	783	784	784	983	992	1,026		
DUP	Robert Catherwood*	9.70%	680	682	682	802	827	888	969	998.68
Ind. Unionist	William Watt*	10.06%	705	725	725.65	745.65	773.65	788.65	898.65	924.41
UUP	James Anderson*	6.36%	446	460	460	464	562			
UUP	Mayne Long	5.64%	395	405	405	413				
DUP	Irwin Holmes	5.22%	366	368	368.1					
Alliance	Anne Lambert	1.67%	117							
Electorate: 8,960 Valid: 7,008 (78.21%) Spoilt: 179 Quota: 1,002 Turnout: 7,187 (80.21%)

== 1977 Election ==
1973: 4 x UUP, 1 x SDLP, 1 x Independent Unionist

1977: 3 x UUP, 1 x SDLP, 1 x DUP, 1 x Independent Unionist

1973-1977 Change: DUP gain from UUP

Coleraine Area A - 6 seats
Party	Candidate	FPv%	Count						
Party	Candidate	FPv%	1	2	3	4	5	6	7
DUP	Robert Catherwood	10.04%	605	606	609	1,015			
UUP	James Anderson*	12.63%	761	762	790	822	871.28		
UUP	George McIlrath	9.01%	543	543	573	582	604.88	926.88	
UUP	William King	11.19%	674	675	706	730	764.32	878.32	
Ind. Unionist	William Watt*	10.34%	623	624	668	689	719.36	796.28	861.02
SDLP	John Dallat	10.34%	623	709	819	819	819	819	819.39
SDLP	Patrick Cassidy*	9.16%	552	592	751	751	751.44	751.44	751.83
UUP	Robert McMaster*	8.37%	504	506	515	526	540.96		
DUP	Robert Campbell	5.64%	508	508	512				
Alliance	Martha McGrath	4.66%	281	283					
Republican Clubs	Jerry Mullan	3.44%	207	210					
SDLP	Robert Tosh	2.37%	143						
Electorate: 9,014 Valid: 6,024 (66.83%) Spoilt: 260 Quota: 861 Turnout: 6,284 (69.71%)

=== Area A ===
1973: 4 x UUP, 1 x SDLP, 1 x Independent Unionist

Coleraine Area A - 6 seats
Party	Candidate	FPv%	Count										
Party	Candidate	FPv%	1	2	3	4	5	6	7	8	9	10	11
Ind. Unionist	William Watt	16.24%	1,121										
UUP	Leslie Morrell	15.57%	1,075										
UUP	James Anderson	13.41%	926	941.36	987.52								
UUP	J. H. McElfatrick	9.34%	645	678.12	689.16	706	718.48	767.32	768.44	803.52	807.52	1,099.52	
SDLP	Patrick Cassidy	7.87%	543	543.12	543.36	545.48	572.2	574.32	596.32	702.56	970.64	972.72	972.72
UUP	Robert McMaster	7.88%	544	568.6	577.96	583.8	595.44	629.4	630.4	658.32	660.32	850.48	961.66
SDLP	P. McIntyre	8.00%	552	552.24	552.24	552.24	555.32	555.44	566.44	631.68	744.04	745.32	745.32
UUP	G. Campbell	5.58%	385	396.64	408.64	420.4	435.68	476.72	477.72	533.84	533.84		
Republican Clubs	J. B. McNicholl	3.98%	275	275.24	275.24	275.24	276.36	276.36	467.36	474.56			
Alliance	J. B. Austin	4.74%	327	330.24	331.92	332.16	345.68	351.6	351.6				
Republican Clubs	Jerry Mullan	3.22%	222	222	222	222	230.12	230.12					
Independent	H. McMaster	2.20%	152	164.6	167.96	176.4	182.88						
Independent	C. R. Lee	1.22%	84	109.56	110.12	112.24							
Independent	S. Boyd	0.77%	53	57.8	58.28								
Electorate: 8,878 Valid: 6,904 (77.77%) Spoilt: 64 Quota: 987 Turnout: 6,968 (78.49%)
