= Jill Marsden =

Jill Marsden may refer to:

- Jill Marsden (scholar) (born 1964), British scholar
- Jill Marsden (EastEnders), fictional character
