= 1977 Coleraine Borough Council election =

Local government election in Northern Ireland

← 1973	18 May 1977	1981 →

All 20 seats to Coleraine Borough Council 11 seats needed for a majority
	First party	Second party	Third party
Party	UUP	DUP	Alliance
Seats won	10	2	2
Seat change	▼3	▲2	▼1
	Fourth party	Fifth party	Sixth party
Party	SDLP	Independent	Ind. Unionist
Seats won	2	2	2
Seat change	▲1	0	▲1

Elections to Coleraine Borough Council were held on 18 May 1977 on the same day as the other Northern Irish local government elections. The election used three district electoral areas to elect a total of 20 councillors.

== Election results ==
Coleraine Borough Council Election Result 1977
Party	Seats	Gains	Losses	Net gain/loss	Seats %	Votes %	Votes	+/−
UUP	10	0	3	▼3	50.0	38.2	6,980	▼19.0
DUP	2	2	0	▲2	30.0	17.6	3,224	New
Independent	2	0	0	0	10.0	11.3	2,059	▼1.0
Alliance	2	0	1	▼1	10.0	10.6	1,946	▼2.6
SDLP	2	1	0	▲1	10.0	10.5	1,913	▲5.5
Ind. Unionist	2	1	0	▲1	10.0	7.9	1,445	▼2.8
Vanguard	0	0	0	0	0.0	2.8	517	New
Republican Clubs	0	0	0	0	0.0	1.1	207	▼1.9
Unity	0	0	0	0	0.0	1.1	203	New

Note: "Votes" are the first preference votes.

== Districts summary ==
Results of the Coleraine Borough Council election, 1977 by district
Ward	%	Cllrs	%	Cllrs	%	Cllrs	%	Cllrs	%	Cllrs	Total Cllrs
Ward	UUP		DUP		Alliance		SDLP		Others		Total Cllrs
Area A	41.2	3	18.5	1	4.7	0	21.9	1	13.7	1	6
Area B	52.4	4	0.0	0	16.9	1	11.2	1	19.5	1	7
Area C	24.6	3	30.4	1	11.1	1	0.0	0	33.9	2	7
Total	38.2	10	17.6	2	10.6	2	10.5	2	23.1	4	20

== Districts results ==
=== Area A ===
1973: 4 x UUP, 1 x SDLP, 1 x Independent Unionist
1977: 3 x UUP, 1 x SDLP, 1 x DUP, 1 x Independent Unionist
1973-1977 Change: DUP gain from UUP

Coleraine Area A - 6 seats
Party	Candidate	FPv%	Count						
Party	Candidate	FPv%	1	2	3	4	5	6	7
DUP	Robert Catherwood	10.04%	605	606	609	1,015			
UUP	James Anderson*	12.63%	761	762	790	822	871.28		
UUP	George McIlrath	9.01%	543	543	573	582	604.88	926.88	
UUP	William King	11.19%	674	675	706	730	764.32	878.32	
Ind. Unionist	William Watt*	10.34%	623	624	668	689	719.36	796.28	861.02
SDLP	John Dallat	10.34%	623	709	819	819	819	819	819.39
SDLP	Patrick Cassidy*	9.16%	552	592	751	751	751.44	751.44	751.83
UUP	Robert McMaster*	8.37%	504	506	515	526	540.96		
DUP	Robert Campbell	5.64%	508	508	512				
Alliance	Martha McGrath	4.66%	281	283					
Republican Clubs	Jerry Mullan	3.44%	207	210					
SDLP	Robert Tosh	2.37%	143						
Electorate: 9,014 Valid: 6,024 (66.83%) Spoilt: 260 Quota: 861 Turnout: 6,284 (69.71%)

=== Area B ===
1973: 5 x UUP, 2 x Alliance
1977: 4 x UUP, 1 x Alliance, 1 x SDLP, 1 x Independent Unionist
1973-1977 Change: SDLP gain from Alliance, Independent Unionist leaves UUP

Coleraine Area B - 7 seats
Party	Candidate	FPv%	Count						
Party	Candidate	FPv%	1	2	3	4	5	6	7
UUP	William Glenn*	13.62%	725						
UUP	Albert Clarke*	12.55%	668						
Alliance	Thomas Wilson*	8.25%	439	507	521	522.68	828.68		
UUP	Robert Stafford*	10.60%	564	566	567	578.2	580.2	585.73	736.73
Ind. Unionist	Alexander Sharpe*	11.63%	619	619	619	624.44	626.52	654.96	697.96
UUP	John Earl*	8.55%	455	455	459	478.76	493.76	527.73	671.39
SDLP	Sean Farren	6.74%	359	377	595	595.08	612.08	678.44	678.44
Vanguard	Antony Alcock	8.00%	426	428	428	433.52	436.52	452.32	498.8
UUP	Robert Mitchell	7.04%	375	376	376	389.04	394.12	402.81	
Alliance	Donald Batts	5.32%	283	348	355	355.48			
SDLP	Hugh McIlvenna	4.45%	237	251					
Alliance	Patrick McGowan	3.25%	173						
Electorate: 10,461 Valid: 5,323 (50.88%) Spoilt: 229 Quota: 666 Turnout: 5,552 (53.07%)

=== Area C ===
1973: 4 x UUP, 2 x Independent, 1 x Alliance
1977: 3 x UUP, 2 x Independent, 1 x DUP, 1 x Alliance
1973-1977 Change: DUP gain from UUP

Coleraine Area C - 7 seats
Party	Candidate	FPv%	Count															
Party	Candidate	FPv%	1	2	3	4	5	6	7	8	9	10	11	12	13	14	15	16
DUP	James McClure	30.40%	2,111															
Independent	James McFeely*	13.12%	911															
UUP	Robert White*	11.13%	773	968.62														
Independent	Randall Crawford*	8.94%	621	922.32														
UUP	Matthew Adams*	7.53%	523	690.4	703.9	714.58	714.82	721.28	724.14	737.59	778.54	812.82	874.26					
Alliance	William Mathews*	7.86%	546	560.88	561.38	562.46	570.34	570.96	572	573.66	577.28	579.36	651.47	694.95	890.95			
UUP	Victor Hanson	2.72%	189	267.12	281.37	286.89	287.37	288.49	290.61	296.34	321.75	332.09	369.36	387.66	391.42	394.94	466.45	604.14
Independent	William McNabb	2.97%	206	299	301.25	306.89	309.33	314.55	322.55	332.88	338.48	357.08	375.06	411.18	430.74	444.18	490.11	546.1
UUP	John Millar	2.23%	155	208.32	214.32	218.04	218.28	220.15	221.15	332.88	338.48	357.08	375.06	411.18	430.74	444.18	490.11	
Vanguard	Adrian Eakin	1.31%	91	255.92	261.17	273.65	273.65	276.39	277.39	284.15	289.85	293.82	301.41	309.27	309.35	309.67		
Alliance	Francis Trainor	3.23%	224	226.48	226.73	226.85	244.05	245.17	245.25	248.57	249.61	250.89	258.93	279.05				
Independent	Henry McCormick	1.73%	120	171.46	172.21	174.25	177.93	178.05	184.05	193.21	198.07	250.67	253.54					
Ind. Unionist	James Edwards*	2.92%	203	221.6	226.1	227.42	227.54	228.91	234.03	237.65	240.01	250.5						
Independent	Samuel Walker	1.22%	85	120.96	122.96	124.88	125.48	137.4	146.12	160.88	164.24							
UUP	Charles Graham	1.01%	70	109.68	115.93	119.53	119.61	120.23	122.13	124.37								
Independent	Frederick Millar	0.69%	48	73.42	74.67	76.23	76.71	79.37	92.64									
Independent	Samuel Oliver	0.55%	38	46.06	47.06	48.14	48.34	57.82										
Independent	Howard Platt	0.43%	30	44.88	45.38	47.54	47.82											
Electorate: 11,649 Valid: 6,944 (59.61%) Spoilt: 253 Quota: 869 Turnout: 7,197 (61.78%)
