= Douglas Evans (children's author) =

American writer

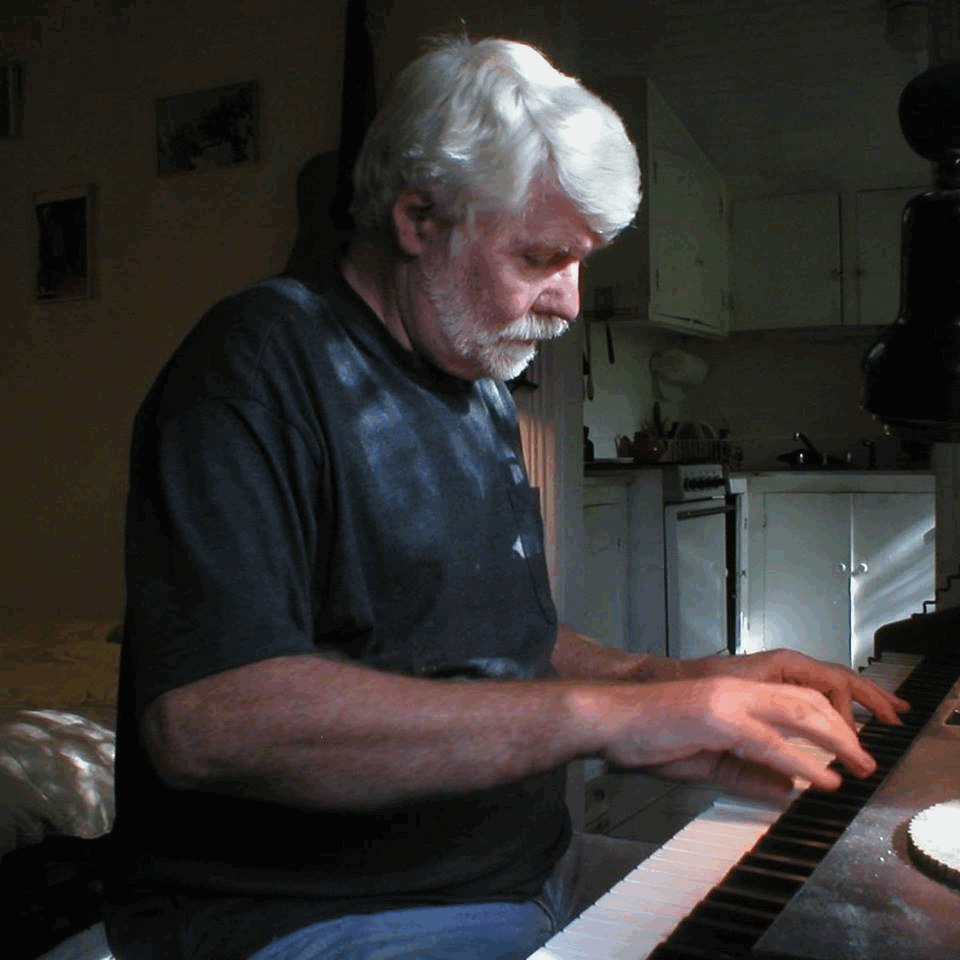
- Born: Euclid, Ohio, U.S.
- Occupations: Author, playwright, composer
- Writing career
- Genre: Middle-grade fiction
- Notable works: Classroom at the End of the Hall; Math Rashes and Other Classroom Tales; MVP: Magellan Voyage Project; The Elevator Family series; The Elevator Family Play
- Website: www.wtmelon.com

Douglas Evans is an author of children's books and a former school teacher in Berkeley, California. He has written books, plays, songs, and poems for children, including Classroom at the End of the Hall which got a starred review in Publishers Weekly. and received record reprint rights for a first time author. The Elevator Family (2003) was included on the Mass. Book Award Master List and was a 2003 Sunshine Award Nominee. MVP: Magellan Voyage Project was the 2009 Connecticut Nutmeg Award Winner and 2008 Rebecca Caudill Award Nominee. His lipogram novel Noe School contains not a single E. 1996 Publishers Weekly Flying Start Author:

== Career ==
Evans adapted his book, The Elevator Family, for the stage. It was first produced by Columbus Children's Theater February 2011 and directed by William Goldsmith to critical acclaim. The play had been produced over 100 times around the world. He is a frequent contributor to PLAYS magazine.

In addition to the music for his musical, The Elevator Family, Evans has composed several albums for children, including Classroom Creatures (2012), Math Rashes and other Classroom Itches (2013), Teacher (2014), Extra Credit (2016), and Morning Recess (2020).

== Awards and honors ==
- 2003 Massachusetts Children's Book Master List
- 2009 Connecticut Nutmeg Book Award winner

== Selected bibliography ==
- Classroom at the End of the Hall. Illustrated by Larry Di Fiori. Front Street. 1996. ISBN 978-1886910072.
- So What Do You Do?. Front Street. 1997. ISBN 978-1886910201.
- Apple Island: Or the Truth about Teachers. Illustrated by Larry Di Fiori. Boyds Mills Press. 1998. ISBN 978-1886910256.
- Math Rashes and Other Classroom Tales. Illustrated by Larry Di Fiori. Scholastic Corporation. 2000. ISBN 978-0439339025.
- The Elevator Family. Yearling Books. 2000. ISBN 978-0440416500.
- MVP: Magellan Voyage Project. Illustrated by John Shelley. Front Street. 2004. ISBN 978-1590786253.
- The Elevator Family Hits the Road. WT Melon Publishing. 2011. ISBN 978-0615686714.
- The Elevator Family Takes a Hike. WT Melon Publishing. 2012. ISBN 978-0615687827.
- The Elevator Family Goes Abroad. WT Melon Publishing. 2013. ISBN 978-0615903514.
- The Elevator Family Plays Hardball. WT Melon Publishing. 2015. ISBN 978-1517601317.
