= 1973 Coleraine Borough Council election =

Local government election in Northern Ireland

| 30 May 1973 | 1977 → |

All 20 seats to Coleraine Borough Council 11 seats needed for a majority
| | First party | Second party | Third party |
|---|---|---|---|
| Party | UUP | Alliance | Independent |
| Seats won | 13 | 3 | 2 |
| | Fourth party | Fifth party |
| Party | SDLP | Ind. Unionist |
| Seats won | 1 | 1 |

Elections to Coleraine Borough Council were held on 30 May 1973 on the same day as the other Northern Irish local government elections. The election used three district electoral areas to elect a total of 20 councillors.

== Election results ==
| Party | Seats | ± | First Pref. votes | FPv% | ±% |
|---|---|---|---|---|---|
| UUP | 13 | | 12,451 | 57.2 | |
| Alliance | 3 | | 2,869 | 13.2 | |
| Independent | 2 | | 2,677 | 12.3 | |
| SDLP | 1 | | 1,483 | 6.8 | |
| Ind. Unionist | 1 | | 1,121 | 5.1 | |
| Republican Clubs | 0 | | 659 | 3.0 | |
| Loyalist | 0 | | 325 | 1.5 | |
| NI Labour | 0 | | 200 | 0.9 | |
| Totals | 20 | | 21,785 | 100.0 | — |

== Districts summary ==
Results of the Coleraine Borough Council election, 1973 by district
| Ward | % | Cllrs | % | Cllrs | % | Cllrs | % | Cllrs | Total Cllrs |
| Ward | UUP | | Alliance | | SDLP | | Others | | Total Cllrs |
|---|---|---|---|---|---|---|---|---|---|
| Area A | 51.8 | 4 | 4.7 | 0 | 15.9 | 1 | 27.6 | 1 | 6 |
| Area B | 63.4 | 5 | 21.3 | 2 | 5.3 | 0 | 10.0 | 0 | 7 |
| Area C | 56.1 | 4 | 13.1 | 1 | 0.0 | 0 | 30.8 | 2 | 7 |
| Total | 57.2 | 13 | 13.2 | 3 | 6.8 | 1 | 22.8 | 3 | 20 |

== Districts results ==
=== Area A ===
1973: 4 x UUP, 1 x SDLP, 1 x Independent Unionist

Coleraine Area A - 6 seats
| Party | Candidate | FPv% | Count | | | | | | | | | | |
| Party | Candidate | FPv% | 1 | 2 | 3 | 4 | 5 | 6 | 7 | 8 | 9 | 10 | 11 |
|---|---|---|---|---|---|---|---|---|---|---|---|---|---|
| Ind. Unionist | William Watt | 16.24% | 1,121 | | | | | | | | | | |
| UUP | Leslie Morrell | 15.57% | 1,075 | | | | | | | | | | |
| UUP | James Anderson | 13.41% | 926 | 941.36 | 987.52 | | | | | | | | |
| UUP | J. H. McElfatrick | 9.34% | 645 | 678.12 | 689.16 | 706 | 718.48 | 767.32 | 768.44 | 803.52 | 807.52 | 1,099.52 | |
| SDLP | Patrick Cassidy | 7.87% | 543 | 543.12 | 543.36 | 545.48 | 572.2 | 574.32 | 596.32 | 702.56 | 970.64 | 972.72 | 972.72 |
| UUP | Robert McMaster | 7.88% | 544 | 568.6 | 577.96 | 583.8 | 595.44 | 629.4 | 630.4 | 658.32 | 660.32 | 850.48 | 961.66 |
| SDLP | P. McIntyre | 8.00% | 552 | 552.24 | 552.24 | 552.24 | 555.32 | 555.44 | 566.44 | 631.68 | 744.04 | 745.32 | 745.32 |
| UUP | G. Campbell | 5.58% | 385 | 396.64 | 408.64 | 420.4 | 435.68 | 476.72 | 477.72 | 533.84 | 533.84 | | |
| Republican Clubs | J. B. McNicholl | 3.98% | 275 | 275.24 | 275.24 | 275.24 | 276.36 | 276.36 | 467.36 | 474.56 | | | |
| Alliance | J. B. Austin | 4.74% | 327 | 330.24 | 331.92 | 332.16 | 345.68 | 351.6 | 351.6 | | | | |
| Republican Clubs | Jerry Mullan | 3.22% | 222 | 222 | 222 | 222 | 230.12 | 230.12 | | | | | |
| Independent | H. McMaster | 2.20% | 152 | 164.6 | 167.96 | 176.4 | 182.88 | | | | | | |
| Independent | C. R. Lee | 1.22% | 84 | 109.56 | 110.12 | 112.24 | | | | | | | |
| Independent | S. Boyd | 0.77% | 53 | 57.8 | 58.28 | | | | | | | | |
Electorate: 8,878 Valid: 6,904 (77.77%) Spoilt: 64 Quota: 987 Turnout: 6,968 (78.49%)

=== Area B ===
1973: 5 x UUP, 2 x Alliance

Coleraine Area B - 7 seats
| Party | Candidate | FPv% | Count | | | | | | | | | |
| Party | Candidate | FPv% | 1 | 2 | 3 | 4 | 5 | 6 | 7 | 8 | 9 | 10 |
|---|---|---|---|---|---|---|---|---|---|---|---|---|
| UUP | Albert Clarke | 15.94% | 1,163 | | | | | | | | | |
| UUP | Alexander Sharpe | 11.01% | 803 | 824.84 | 830.84 | 910.85 | 914.75 | | | | | |
| Alliance | J. Fawcett | 8.39% | 612 | 623.34 | 627.55 | 651.39 | 747.44 | 755.65 | 889.07 | 1,048.07 | | |
| UUP | John Earl | 8.72% | 636 | 716.85 | 720.9 | 750.58 | 757.42 | 795.2 | 805.62 | 815.62 | 817.62 | 959.62 |
| UUP | William Glenn | 9.06% | 661 | 685.99 | 687.99 | 698.07 | 708.49 | 761.27 | 777.27 | 779.27 | 779.27 | 954.27 |
| UUP | Robert Stafford | 11.10% | 810 | 821.13 | 828.13 | 832.91 | 839.59 | 851.06 | 862.48 | 865.69 | 867.69 | 939.69 |
| Alliance | Thomas Wilson | 5.59% | 408 | 409.89 | 414.89 | 417.1 | 468.52 | 468.52 | 639.73 | 786.73 | 910.73 | 933.73 |
| Loyalist | Hagan | 4.46% | 325 | 330.46 | 365.3 | 372.3 | 372.51 | 559.19 | 563.19 | 565.4 | 565.4 | 615.4 |
| UUP | T. D. McVeigh | 5.41% | 395 | 401.51 | 403.51 | 435.98 | 443.98 | 468.61 | 479.61 | 480.61 | 480.61 | |
| SDLP | Isobel Boylan | 5.32% | 388 | 388.21 | 388.21 | 392.21 | 396.21 | 396.42 | 401.42 | | | |
| Alliance | R. J. Smyth | 4.10% | 299 | 300.05 | 301.05 | 306.05 | 362.69 | 369.1 | | | | |
| Independent | C. Dunlop | 3.62% | 264 | 274.92 | 345.76 | 354.81 | 355.81 | | | | | |
| Alliance | J. Hamill | 3.19% | 233 | 237.2 | 241.2 | 247.62 | | | | | | |
| UUP | Katherine McConaghy | 2.14% | 156 | 214.38 | 219.01 | | | | | | | |
| Independent | J. A. Taggart | 1.88% | 137 | 140.15 | | | | | | | | |
| Independent | G. Woods | 0.01% | 5 | 5.42 | | | | | | | | |
Electorate: 10,508 Valid: 7,295 (69.42%) Spoilt: 74 Quota: 912 Turnout: 7,369 (70.13%)

=== Area C ===
1973: 4 x UUP, 2 x Independent, 1 x Alliance

Coleraine Area C - 7 seats
| Party | Candidate | FPv% | Count | | | | | | | | | | | | | | | | |
| Party | Candidate | FPv% | 1 | 2 | 3 | 4 | 5 | 6 | 7 | 8 | 9 | 10 | 11 | 12 | 13 | 14 | 15 | 16 | 17 |
|---|---|---|---|---|---|---|---|---|---|---|---|---|---|---|---|---|---|---|---|
| UUP | Robert White | 16.73% | 1,269 | | | | | | | | | | | | | | | | |
| UUP | James Edwards | 16.03% | 1,216 | | | | | | | | | | | | | | | | |
| UUP | Matthew Adams | 14.66% | 1,112 | | | | | | | | | | | | | | | | |
| Independent | James McFeely | 9.58% | 727 | 733.75 | 735.51 | 738.17 | 740.17 | 746.62 | 769.56 | 848.7 | 852.09 | 927.34 | 934.26 | 962.26 | | | | | |
| Alliance | William Mathews | 5.75% | 436 | 450.25 | 466.75 | 470.53 | 470.53 | 539.35 | 540.74 | 543.74 | 543.99 | 640.93 | 645.59 | 727.45 | 730.3 | 748.19 | 1,017.19 | | |
| UUP | I. Wilson | 4.13% | 313 | 476 | 597.88 | 617.76 | 618.4 | 624.34 | 633.48 | 633.48 | 641.35 | 646.82 | 688.52 | 706.03 | 706.6 | 786.61 | 796.93 | 822.13 | 1,065.13 |
| Independent | Randall Crawford | 5.10% | 387 | 402.5 | 407.78 | 422.06 | 435.31 | 436.31 | 496.72 | 496.72 | 628.96 | 628.96 | 674.81 | 694.76 | 695.9 | 753.63 | 754.1 | 758.3 | 803.81 |
| Independent | J. Doherty | 4.27% | 324 | 335.5 | 339.8 | 359.92 | 362.06 | 365.31 | 369.92 | 373.92 | 384.12 | 386.12 | 400.55 | 428.8 | 429.94 | 501.06 | 514.45 | 545.65 | 609.49 |
| UUP | J. Hamill | 2.66% | 202 | 251 | 330.2 | 349.94 | 356.44 | 358.91 | 364.47 | 364.47 | 369 | 370.5 | 450.21 | 463.12 | 463.69 | 515.54 | 520.21 | 526.81 | |
| Alliance | W. E. O'Hara | 3.11% | 236 | 239.5 | 242.14 | 242.28 | 242.28 | 253.53 | 253.53 | 258.67 | 260.67 | 303.67 | 303.67 | 327.06 | 333.9 | 337.34 | | | |
| Independent | S. J. Walker | 3.05% | 231 | 245.5 | 256.06 | 267.54 | 271.82 | 274.21 | 279.46 | 279.46 | 287.1 | 289.32 | 310.23 | 331.25 | 331.25 | | | | |
| NI Labour | R. E. Adams | 2.64% | 200 | 204 | 210.16 | 214.5 | 214.5 | 217.64 | 220.78 | 236.78 | 243.06 | 249.06 | 249.89 | | | | | | |
| UUP | R. H. S. Edmundson | 1.85% | 140 | 158.5 | 169.94 | 211.38 | 213.66 | 214.13 | 226.55 | 226.55 | 238.34 | 239.62 | | | | | | | |
| Alliance | Eileen Farrell | 2.73% | 207 | 208 | 209.1 | 209.66 | 209.66 | 218.66 | 219.8 | 233.8 | 234.8 | | | | | | | | |
| Independent | J. Anderson | 1.70% | 129 | 132.5 | 133.16 | 142.4 | 155.79 | 158.04 | 196.62 | 196.62 | | | | | | | | | |
| Republican Clubs | J. A. Fleming | 2.14% | 162 | 162 | 162 | 162.14 | 162.14 | 162.14 | 162.28 | | | | | | | | | | |
| Independent | A. Eakin | 1.58% | 120 | 122.75 | 124.73 | 127.95 | 148 | 148.34 | | | | | | | | | | | |
| Alliance | Hamilton | 1.46% | 111 | 115 | 117.42 | 117.98 | 117.98 | | | | | | | | | | | | |
| Independent | K. Ferguson | 0.84% | 64 | 66.25 | 66.69 | 68.09 | | | | | | | | | | | | | |
Electorate: 10,886 Valid: 7,586 (69.69%) Spoilt: 108 Quota: 949 Turnout: 7,694 (70.68%)
