= Muslim Power 100 =

- Language: English
- Subject: Biographical dictionary
- Genre: Non-fiction
- Publisher: The Power 100
- Publication date: 10 February 2007
- Publication place: United Kingdom
- Media type: Online

Muslim Power 100 is a 2007 list published by The Power 100 website compiled of the top 100 British Muslims who have contributed positively to the United Kingdom.

== Overview ==
The Power 100 website compiled the Muslim Power list to recognise Muslims who have made "significant contributions to the social, cultural and economic well-being of Britain." The website said it was "applauding the vital achievement and contribution being made by the British Muslim community to the social, cultural and economic well-being of Britain."

The Muslim minority contributes over £31 billion to the British economy each year.

== Ceremony ==
On 10 February 2007, the list was announced at a ceremony in the Hilton Hotel on Park Lane in London, after nine months preparation and voting.

The list consisted of business leaders, writers, academics, doctors, campaigners, aid agency founders, lords, lawyers, authors, sporting icons, to giants of industry, actors, journalists and police officers.

The event also saw the winners of the Muslim Power 100 Excellence Awards announced, which was divided into nine categories, the awards celebrate their winners' contribution to these sectors in British society.

The Power 100 website received 5,200 nominations, which were a 16-strong panel including Sir Iqbal Sacranie (Muslim Council of Britain), Lord Amir Bhatia (House of Lords), Dr Ghayasuddin Siddiqui (Muslim Parliament of Great Britain).

The list was sponsored by the Islamic Bank of Britain. Sultan Choudhury, managing director and spokesman for the Islamic Bank of Britain, said: "We wanted to highlight the positive contributions made by British Muslims to society - contributions that are in complete contrast with media connotations that somehow Muslims are linked to terrorism, are not as educated, or are segregating themselves. The opposite is true - we are integrating and contributing across a wide range of fields." He added: "Not only does this list recognise exceptional achievements, but it also illustrates the opportunities for success available for Muslims in Britain."

== Notable entries ==
The list did not rank those nominated in order of importance.

Sportspeople on the list are cricketer turned politician Imran Khan and boxer Amir Khan. Also featured are actor Art Malik and singer Yusuf Islam (formerly Cat Stevens). The list includes 22 company chiefs, including Harrods boss Mohamed Al-Fayed and "curry king" Sir Gulam Noon, whose curry empire is worth around £55 million.

Journalists included on the list are The Sun reporter Anila Baig, Independent columnist Yasmin Alibhai-Brown, broadcaster Rageh Omaar and the journalist Yvonne Ridley, who was once captured in Afghanistan by the Taliban, but later converted to Islam.

Politicians and religious leaders on the list include former secretary general of the Muslim Council of Britain (MCB) Sir Iqbal Sacranie, the current MCB secretary general Dr Muhammad Abdul Bari, Baroness Pola Uddin, and the MPs Sadiq Khan, Shahid Malik and Khalid Mahmood.

Other entries included are Irene Khan of Amnesty and Rear Admiral Amjad Hussain. Metropolitan Police assistant commissioner Tarique Ghaffur and Labour peer Lord Adam Patel of Blackburn were also featured.

== Awards ==
Excellence awards were given at the ceremony to nine guests including Dr Hany El-Banna, founder of Islamic Relief, and Haifa Fahoum Al Kaylani, chair of the Arab International Women's Forum. The Outstanding Contribution Award was awarded to Dr Hany El Banna.

== Ones to watch ==
The Muslim Power 100 publication also includes a list of 70 individuals highlighted as ones to watch for 2007. These individuals narrowly missed out on making the list for 2007, however, they were expected to feature in the future.

== See also ==
- British Muslims
- List of British Muslims
- The 500 Most Influential Muslims
- The Muslim 100
- Top 100 (disambiguation)
- Who's Who
