= Thorarinn G. Petursson =

Icelandic economist

Thorarinn G. Petursson (born 2 July 1966) is an Icelandic economist. Since 15 September 2009 he is the Chief Economist of the Central Bank of Iceland.

== Education ==
Petursson received his PhD degree in economics from Aarhus University, Denmark, in 1998. He has the M.S. degree in economics from the University of Essex in the UK in 1992 and a Cand. Oecon. degree in economics from the University of Iceland in 1991.

== Career ==
Prior to his appointment as Chief Economist, Petursson was Acting Chief Economist of the Bank from the end of February 2009 and became at the same time a member of the Bank's Monetary Policy Committee. He began his career at the Bank as an economist at the Economics Department in January 1994, but has served as the Deputy Chief Economist and the Head of Research and Forecasting at the Bank from June 2004. He has a long career as a university lecturer in economics.

== Bibliography ==
He has published numerous articles in domestic and international academic journals on monetary policy and macroeconomics. From 2001 to 2006, he led an effort to develop the Central Banks‘ new Quarterly Macroeconomic Model (QMM) of the Icelandic economy.
