= Mariela Belski =

Argentine lawyer

Mariela Belsk
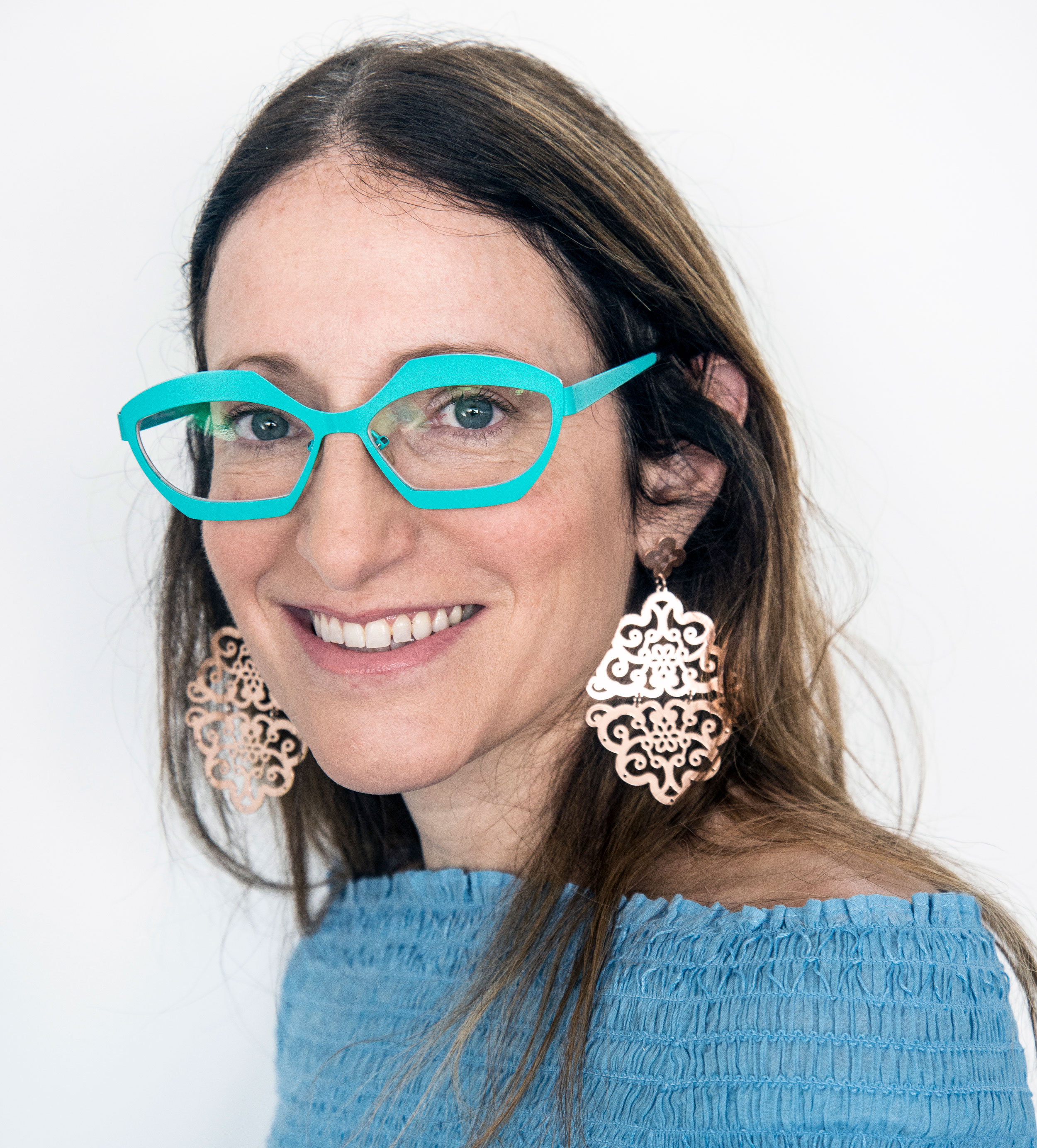
- Born: 1971 (age 54–55); Buenos Aires, Argentina
- Education: University of Buenos Aires; University of Essex; University of Chile
- Occupations: lawyer; activist
- Employer(s): Executive Director, Amnesty International Argentina

Mariela Belski (born 1971) is an Argentine feminist lawyer and human rights activist. As an activist, she promotes the defense and exercise of the rights of women and young people. She is an ambassador for #EllaDecide (#SheDecides), the global women's rights movement. Since 2011, she has served as executive director of Amnesty International Argentina.

== Early life and education ==
Mariela Belski was born in Buenos Aires, 1971. She studied law at the University of Buenos Aires, obtaining her degree with an orientation in administrative law and later specialized in human rights. She completed a master's degree in International Human Rights Law at the University of Essex, and later took a postgraduate course in Human Rights and Democratization Processes at the University of Chile.

== Career ==
Belski is a member of the Women Leaders of the Americas Committee, an initiative of the Documentation Foundation. She is also a delegate of "Women 20", a transnational network that brings together women leaders to influence the agenda of the G20 decision-making groups. She has represented Argentina on international panels on human rights issues in the world and the region, such as the human rights crisis in Venezuela.

Regarding issues on the national agenda, she has taken part in parliamentary debates on the modification of the law regulating the country's immigration policy, and the project for the Voluntary Interruption of Pregnancy (IVE). She has been invited as a specialist to participate in public debates in the country. Among other topics she addressed the humanitarian situation in Venezuela, sexual and reproductive rights, the refugee crisis, and climate change.

== Selected works ==
- Background paper on strategic litigation on women's sexual and reproductive rights in Latin America for the “Progress of the World’s Women Access to Justice : (2011), UNIFEM New York, USA.
- “La judicialización de la política: el litigio estructural en materia educativa, posibilidades y obstáculos”, (2009) Revista Propuesta Educativa, No33, FLACSO, Buenos Aires Argentina.
- “The implication of the Global Financial Crisis for NGOs working towards the achievement of Education for All: Country Case Study Argentina”, (2009) UNESCO.
- “Desigualdad Educativa en la Provincia de Buenos Aires” (2009). Asociación por los Derechos Civiles.
- La Corte y los Derechos: Un informe sobre el contexto y el impacto de sus decisiones durante el período 2005–2007, ADC,(2008) Siglo XXI editores.
- “Access to Information: An Instrumental Right for Empowerment”. Article 19 y Asociación por los Derechos Civiles (2007).
- “Una Censura Sutil: Abuso de publicidad oficial y otras restricciones a la libertad de expresión en Argentina”. Co-Autora (2005), Asociación por los Derechos Civiles. Open Society Justice Initiative.
