= Aseel (platform) =

E-commerce website

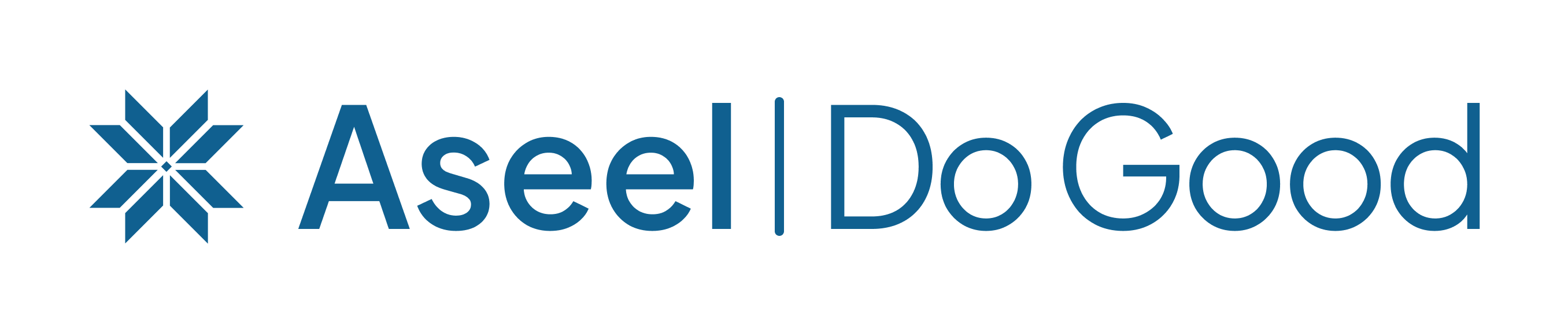
- Type: Private
- Industry: E-commerce and Humanitarian
- Founded: May 2019
- Founder: Nasrat Khalid
- Headquarters: Arlington County, Virginia, USA
- Area served: Europe, United states, Asia and Australia
- Services: Online marketplace, Humanitarian aid delivery
- Subsidiaries: Aseel Do Good
- Website: aseelapp.com

Aseel (Persian: Aseel, meaning “authentic”) is an Afghan e-commerce and humanitarian platform founded by Afghan entrepreneur Nasrat Khalid. The platform was established in 2019 to enable artisans sell their products abroad. In August 2021, an emergency appeal for aid to Afghanistan was launched through the platform. Since 2021, Aseel has operated as a hybrid platform that combines an online marketplace (“Buy Good”) with aid coordination initiatives (“Do Good”). The platform also gives its technology to other international humanitarian organizations using AidOS.com (Aid Operating System).

== History ==
Aseel was founded in 2017 by Afghan entrepreneur Nasrat Khalid to create an online marketplace enabling Afghan artisans to sell handmade crafts internationally, a model Khalid described as akin to an “Etsy of Afghanistan.” The platform officially launched in May 2019 at the Afghan Embassy in Washington, D.C.

In August 2021, following the collapse of Afghanistan’s previous government earlier that month, Aseel broadened its scope to include emergency humanitarian response activities. The platform introduced Aseel Do Good, a mechanism allowing individuals outside Afghanistan to contribute to aid distribution, marking a shift toward a hybrid commerce-and-aid model that combined its marketplace operations with structured humanitarian support. Aseel operates key offices in Arlington (USA) , Turkey, and Afghanistan.

== Humanitarian activities ==
Aseel began humanitarian operations in August 2021, initially focusing on emergency food and shelter assistance in Kabul Province. During 2022, these activities expanded to other provinces. In 2022, Aseel coordinated the distribution of emergency aid packages including food, first-aid materials, and child-focused relief items in 24 of 34 Afghan provinces.

Aseel also participated in responses to displacement crises and natural disasters including earthquake-related relief efforts. During the June 2022 earthquake in Paktika and Khost in Afghanistan, Aseel was among the responders. According to its website, Aseel was also engaged in helping in 2023 Turkey–Syria earthquakes.

Between 2019 and 2023, Aseel’s platform reportedly enabled 3,000 Afghan women to sell handicrafts and traditional products online.

== See also ==
- E-commerce
- Afghan economy
