= Bangladesh Rehabilitation Centre for Trauma Victims =

- Formation: 1992
- Location: 27, Bijoy Nagar, Dhaka, Bangladesh
- Official language: English
- Leader: Akram H. Chowdhury
- Website: brct.org

Bangladesh Rehabilitation Centre for Trauma Victims (BRCT; Bengali: বিআরসিটি) is a Bangladeshi NGO, working in the area of rehabilitation of trauma victims. It was established in 1992. BRCT began its journey by providing medical treatment, legal support, and rehabilitation to the victims on 25 February 1992 with support from foreign medical experts.

== Founder ==
BRTC was founded by Akram H. Chowdhury, a human rights activist and member of the 9th parliament.

== Activity ==
There are two major area of concentration or activities of BRCT – the curative and the preventive ones. BRCT has been operating a very up-dated treatment at Dhaka exclusively for the torture survivors to improve their physical and psychological structure for restoration in the society under the supervision of allied experts. Besides Medicare, physiotherapy and psychotherapy it provides prompt counselling, legal aids, lobbying home visit provide them physical rehabilitation and financial rehabilitation for the torture survivors.

The legal department of BRCT was developed in 1994. The legal department of the BRCT is concerned about both curative and preventive measures. Curative activities include arranging bail, providing legal advice, taking cases to court and lobbying legislative changes. Preventive activities include raising awareness to the public, seminars, symposiums and training community health workers (CHW) through use DDCAT. Taking cases trial can be considered curative as well as preventive as these acts could be deterrents for police to commit such crimes.

The monthly regular publications of BRCT is Manobadhikar Aunushandhani (Human Rights Fact-finder) and Article 14 is a quarterly published English newsletter. BRCT observes the International Day in Support of Torture Victims on 26 June and International Human Rights Day on 10 December regularly and makes awareness among the people of Bangladesh. It organises various rallies, seminars, posters, stickers & leaflets, bills, etc. to create public awareness in Bangladesh.

=== Preventive ===
- Victim's Associations (VA)
- Door to Door Campaign Against Torture (DDCAT)
- Task Force Against Torture (TFT)
- Home Visits
- Research and Documentation
- Lobbying for Change and Spreading Awareness

=== Curative ===
- Integrated Rehabilitation Approach (IRA)
- Community Bades Rehabilitation (CBR)
- Community Health Assistant Program (CHA)

=== Integrated Rehabilitation Approach ===
As already stated, the ultimate goal of BRCT is to provide victims of torture with a combination of treatment and rehabilitation to allow full integration back into their homes and communities. Early on, BRCT recognised that completed rehabilitation could not occur with a little medication and a bandage. Rehabilitation involves a multidisciplinary approach and at BRCT. This approach has come to be known as the integrated rehabilitation approach (IRA). The IRA consists of services at BRCT including counselling, medical care, physiotherapy, psychotherapy, and legal assistance. The IRA also involves group and family therapy, follow-ups including home visits.

=== Victims' Association ===
Once the victims, especially of rural areas, return to their communities, they will often form or join a victim's association (VA). The VA was initiated by the BRCT as a way for victims to continue rehabilitation at home by actively participating in a program that supports one another, future victims and as a means to prevent future torture occurrences from happening by spreading awareness.

VA's are based on three pillars of strength: Mental (মনবল), Human Power (জনবল) and Financial Solvency (অর্থবল), and have the impact of shifting feelings of loneliness to unity. They are self-help groups that consist of approximately 10 – 30 members and they hold monthly meeting to discuss their won social and economic problems.

=== Task Force against Torture ===
BRCT started a unique program called Task Force against Torture (TFT), in the preventive part, formed at different district level consisting of local doctors, lawyers, journalists, teachers and social workers, who will take initiative for the protection against torture as well as human rights violations. The members of the TFT will facilitate treatment for the victims of torture locally, will arrange seminars, worships and discussion meeting for general awareness about torture and human rights violations and will take necessary initiative to stop any incidence of torture.

=== Door to Door Campaign Against Torture ===
The Door-to-Door Campaign Against Torture (DDCAT) is a village-level anti-torture and human rights empowerment campaign initiated by BRCT in April 2000. Its mandate is to remove the veil of silence that has kept torture victims from asserting their rights as human beings and as citizens of their own country, and to amplify those voices muffled by poverty, illiteracy and fear through a national movement against torture. The DDCAT began as a pilot program stemming from the UN human rights Decade (1995–2004) and two stickers were produced in the first three years of the program in an attempt to spread the anti-torture message into every home in the country. Today the DDCAT program is focused mainly in the 10 districts of the division of Khulna as this is an area prone to violence and it is also where most other BRCT programs are now initiated.

=== Treatment and rehabilitation ===
BRCT under curative activities sincerely addresses almost all complications with available resource. BRCT Treatment Center is concerned with the treatment of the torture victims and provides services through a process termed as Integrated Rehabilitation Approach (IRA). It is a multidisciplinary approach, which includes physical, psychological as well as economic rehabilitation measures. From the very outset BRCT is operating a Dhaka-based treatment centre as outdoor services provided to the victims. BRCT considers a person as torture survivors when victimised only perpetrated by the members of the law enforcing agencies and security forces of Bangladesh. Most of the torture survivors visited the centre with acute physical complication to get the psychological, economical and legal supports.

== BRCT Documentation Centre ==
BRCT is running a Documentation Centre to having information and documents on human rights topics focusing on torture. The main objective of BRCT documentation centre is to organise a human rights library and to provide information on human rights to the human rights activist and promoting awareness among the people of Bangladesh about fundamental rights.

The documentation centre is regularly maintaining communication with local and international organisation to collect documents.

The most expending and escalating activities of the organisation is BRCT documentation unit. It has created scope for the users to enjoy new collections of information with Internet facilities. A good number of readers are regularly collecting materials from the library of BRCT. BRCT is also providing photocopy service to the users on request. Besides the regular work of Documentation centre, which includes readers' service, feature services, collecting library materials etc.
