= Nasrat Khalid =

Afghan social entrepreneur and humanitarian

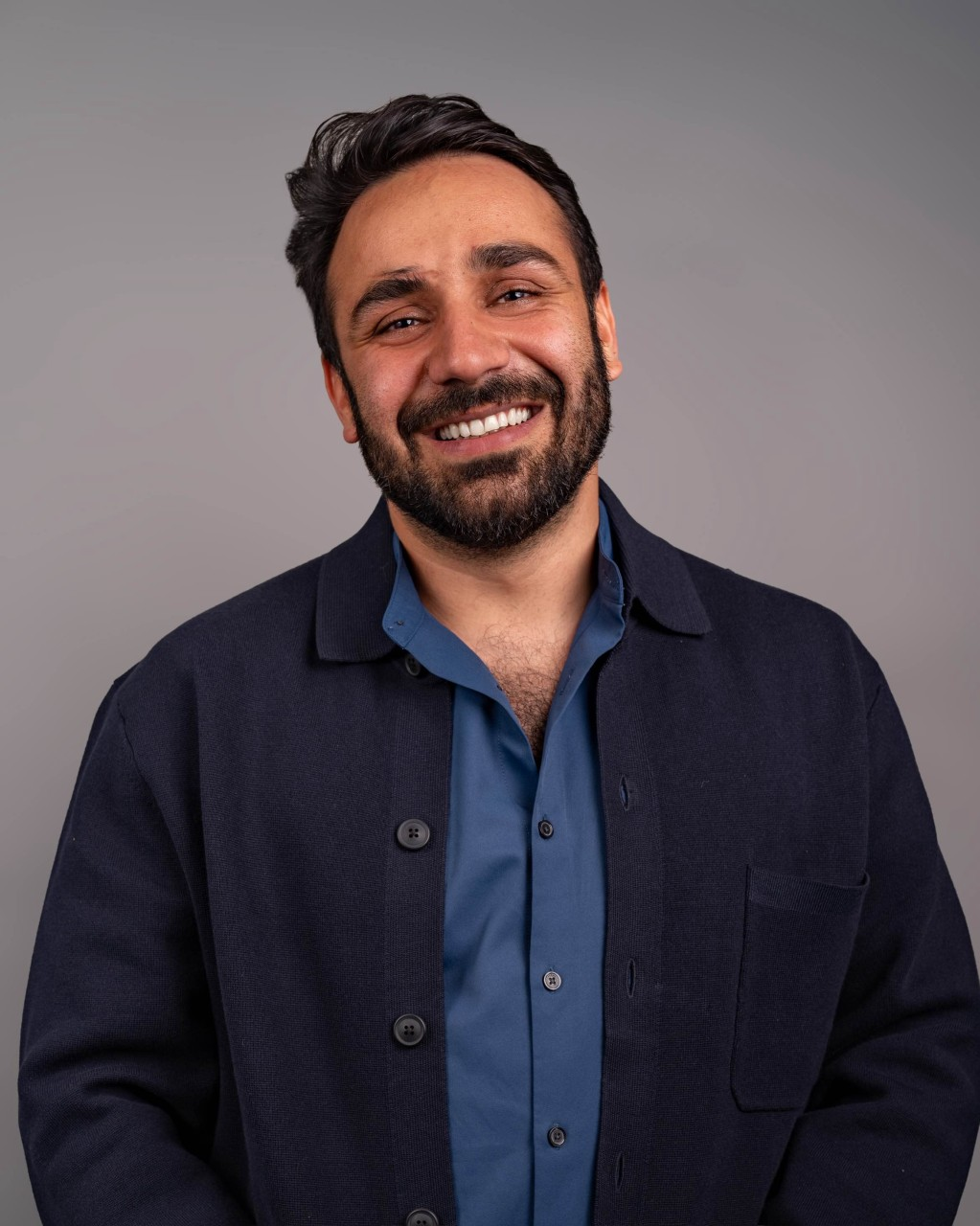
- Born: Nasrat Khalid; Kabul, Afghanistan
- Education: University of Essex
- Occupations: Social entrepreneur, humanitarian
- Years active: 2017- present
- Organization: Aseel
- Known for: Humanitarianism, Technology entrepreneurship
- Title: Founder at Aseel

Nasrat Khalid is an Afghan social entrepreneur and humanitarian. He is the founder and CEO at Aseel, a Washington, DC-based digital marketplace launched in 2019 to connect Afghan artisans with buyers in global markets using its Buy Good platform. Since 2021, after the political transition in Afghanistan, he publicly helped by expanding Aseel with a humanitarian Do Good platform.

== Early life and education ==
Khalid was born in Kabul, Afghanistan. He grew up in Pakistan as a refugee until the age of 16. He developed an early interest in computers through access to school computer labs and began self-training in network systems engaged in technology and development initiatives in Afghanistan. He earned technical certifications in computer networking and later obtained a Master’s degree in Business and Management from the University of Essex in UK in 2015.

== Career ==
From 2008 to 2017, Khalid worked with international development and multilateral institutions, including the Education Development Center (EDC) in the U. S., where he served in as Information Technology Consultant offering skills training for Afghan youth in a project funded by USAID. Subsequently, he joined Chemonics International in the U.S as a technology lead. Later, he taught at the American University of Afghanistan (AUAF). In 2012, Khalid joined the World Bank, where he worked with the Afghanistan Country Office until 2020, then in South Asia, and eventually out of the World Bank's HQ in Washington, DC.

== Aseel ==
In 2017, Khalid founded Aseel to help artisans sell handicrafts internationally, working with Afghan artisans from underrepresented communities. The word "Aseel" is Pashto, Dari, Urdu and Arabic for "authentic". It was launched in the Afghan Embassy in DC. It started by connecting rural artisans, including women embroiderers in Bamyan and carpet weavers in Faryab, to overseas buyers. According to Khalid, he wanted the platform to be the Etsy of Afghanistan. The Aseel has grown to sell Afghan and Turkish handicrafts to Europe, the United states and Australia.

Since 2021, after the political transition in Afghanistan, there was the disruption of local businesses and the economy. Under Khalid's leadership, Aseel shifted into a humanitarian platform. The platform reportedly was used to distribute of food, hygiene materials, baby care packages and medical kits. During the June 2022 earthquake in Paktika and Khost in Afghanistan, Aseel was among the responders in distributing emergency packages and raising supports. Aseel has since then responded to the earthquake in Turkey, floods across Afghanistan, and many other humanitarian disasters.

In 2022, Khalid opposed the Taliban's ban on women education and working with NGOs, he pledged to keep Aseel's female staff and volunteers active remotely and aimed to launch initiatives to expand remote work opportunities for women across Afghanistan such as the "50 Afghan Women in Tech" program.

== Publications ==
- Securitizing Youth: Young People's Roles in the Global Peace and Security Agenda. ISBN 978-1978822382

== Recognition ==
- 2016: ICANN Fellow.
- 2022: Andrew E. Rice Award for Leadership and Innovation.
- 2023: MIT Solve Finalist.
- 2025: Meaningful Business 100.
