= Jill Marsden (scholar) =

Jill Marsden is a scholar of the work of German philosopher Friedrich Wilhelm Nietzsche. Marsden completed her BA, MA and PhD from the University of Essex. She is a senior lecturer and senior research manager at the University of Bolton.

Marsden was also granted the title of Professor in 2021. According to the Chair of Professorial and Research Committee: “She is an internationally accomplished researcher who shares her abundant expertise with students to help them achieve their full potential.”

Marsden is the author of After Nietzsche: Notes Towards a Philosophy of Ecstasy (Palgrave Macmillan, 2002).
