= 1985 Coleraine Borough Council election =

Local government election in Northern Ireland

← 1981	15 May 1985	1989 →

All 21 seats to Coleraine Borough Council 12 seats needed for a majority
	First party	Second party	Third party
Party	UUP	DUP	SDLP
Seats won	10	6	2
Seat change	▲2	0	0
	Fourth party	Fifth party
Party	Alliance	Independent
Seats won	2	1
Seat change	▲1	▼2

Elections to Coleraine Borough Council were held on 15 May 1985 on the same day as the other Northern Irish local government elections. The election used three district electoral areas to elect a total of 21 councillors.

== Election results ==
Coleraine Borough Council Election Result 1985
Party	Seats	Gains	Losses	Net gain/loss	Seats %	Votes %	Votes	+/−
UUP	10	2	0	▲2	47.6	42.9	8,727	▲8.7
DUP	6	0	0	0	28.6	30.5	6,210	▼2.7
SDLP	2	0	0	0	9.5	12.9	2,621	▲1.2
Alliance	2	1	0	▲1	9.5	6.2	1,510	▼0.1
Independent	1	0	2	▼2	4.8	5.4	1,105	▼5.4
Irish Republican Socialist	0	0	0	0	0.0	1.4	276	New
Labour Party NI	0	0	0	0	0.0	0.5	110	New
Green (NI)	0	0	0	0	0.0	0.2	44	▼0.4

Note: "Votes" are the first preference votes.

== Districts summary ==
Results of the Coleraine Borough Council election, 1985 by district
Ward	%	Cllrs	%	Cllrs	%	Cllrs	%	Cllrs	%	Cllrs	Total Cllrs
Ward	UUP		DUP		SDLP		Alliance		Others		Total Cllrs
Bann	51.9	4	21.5	1	23.0	2	0.0	0	3.6	0	7
Coleraine Town	26.9	2	41.6	3	4.5	0	8.0	1	19.0	1	7
The Skerries	48.2	4	30.2	2	9.1	0	11.9	1	0.6	0	7
Total	42.9	10	30.5	6	12.9	2	6.2	2	7.5	1	21

== District results ==
=== Bann ===
1985: 4 x UUP, 2 x SDLP, 1 x DUP

Bann - 7 seats
Party	Candidate	FPv%	Count					
Party	Candidate	FPv%	1	2	3	4	5	6
UUP	William King*	17.14%	1,310					
UUP	Creighton Hutchinson	15.04%	1,150					
SDLP	John Dallat*	14.21%	1,086					
UUP	William Watt	12.06%	922	1,005.7				
SDLP	Gerard O'Kane*	8.84%	676	678.16	678.5	794.42	996.42	
DUP	Robert Catherwood*	9.98%	763	776.77	810.94	811.3	811.3	1,023.3
UUP	John Moody	7.61%	582	761.28	899.49	900.21	900.72	933.72
DUP	Thomas Malone*	7.27%	556	611.62	621.31	621.31	623.58	687.58
DUP	Douglas Darragh	4.23%	323	332.45	337.21	337.81	337.81	
Irish Republican Socialist	Eamon Mullan	3.61%	276	276.81	276.81	284.73		
Electorate: 11,018 Valid: 7,644 (69.38%) Spoilt: 155 Quota: 956 Turnout: 7,799 (70.78%)

=== Coleraine Town ===
1985: 3 x DUP, 2 x UUP, 1 x Alliance, 1 x Independent

Coleraine Town - 7 seats
Party	Candidate	FPv%	Count											
Party	Candidate	FPv%	1	2	3	4	5	6	7	8	9	10	11	12
DUP	James McClure*	38.12%	2,444											
UUP	Robert White*	16.06%	1,030											
Independent	Patrick McFeely	9.11%	584	613.24	617.64	633.86	654.54	655.44	864.44					
UUP	Gladys Black	5.74%	368	456.4	549.46	550.68	552.36	559.92	560.92	561.84	610.86	845.86		
DUP	Robert Bolton*	0.92%	59	674.4	678.58	679.58	683.84	751.4	751.4	751.4	785.62	827.82		
Alliance	William Mathews	6.53%	419	440.08	451.74	514.42	536.42	537.78	584.46	617.12	658.42	712.6	723.62	723.62
DUP	Marie McAllister	2.14%	137	470.2	475.04	475.72	480.4	581.86	581.86	581.86	606.76	676.88	696.6	712.92
Independent	William McNabb*	4.37%	280	408.52	425.9	428.58	440.26	443.2	452.2	469.68	611.62	676.94	689.7	693.1
UUP	Stephen Smyth	5.15%	330	445.6	511.16	515.16	519.84	539.46	539.46	540.38	577.42			
Independent	Randall Crawford*	3.76%	241	338.24	355.84	359.84	379.52	385.36	397.36	407.48				
SDLP	Deirdre Busby	4.46%	286	286.68	286.68	289.68	307.68	307.68						
DUP	Geoffrey Whitehead	0.44%	28	212.96	216.92	216.92	217.6							
Labour Party NI	Timothy Blackman	1.72%	110	118.16	118.6	119.6								
Alliance	Colm McCloskey	1.50%	96	98.04	98.7									
Electorate: 11,221 Valid: 6,412 (57.14%) Spoilt: 130 Quota: 802 Turnout: 6,542 (58.30%)

=== The Skerries ===
1985: 4 x UUP, 2 x DUP, 1 x Alliance

The Skerries - 7 seats
Party	Candidate	FPv%	Count									
Party	Candidate	FPv%	1	2	3	4	5	6	7	8	9	10
DUP	William Creelman*	16.76%	1,056									
UUP	William Glenn*	10.76%	678	693	693.25	714.5	719.5	733	806			
Alliance	Patrick McGowan*	8.63%	544	545.25	553.25	555.25	739.25	740.25	758.25	799.25		
UUP	Elizabeth Black	10.00%	630	636.5	638.5	648.5	655.75	659.5	725	795		
DUP	Matthew Kane*	4.68%	295	362	364	379	380	581	600	633	973	
UUP	Pauline Armitage	8.22%	518	522.5	523.5	532.5	535.5	538.5	570.75	737.25	790.25	
UUP	Robert Mitchell*	4.87%	307	311.5	312.5	381.75	385.75	396	500.75	563.75	635.25	772.25
SDLP	Sean Farren	9.09%	573	573.5	587.5	587.5	591.5	591.5	591.5	593	593	594
DUP	Robert Stewart	5.94%	374	397.5	397.5	415.25	418.25	477.75	496	523.75		
UUP	Hugh Stewart	6.00%	378	386	386	400.5	401.5	408.75	421.25			
UUP	Albert Clarke*	5.06%	319	322.25	322.25	348.25	352.25	355.25				
DUP	Roy Hilldrup	2.78%	175	301.5	301.5	306.5	307.5					
Alliance	Peter Scott	3.25%	205	205.25	215.25	227.25						
UUP	William Robinson	3.25%	205	206.75	207.75							
Green (NI)	Margaret O'Neill	0.70%	44	44.25								
Electorate: 11,156 Valid: 6,301 (56.48%) Spoilt: 113 Quota: 788 Turnout: 6,414 (57.49%)
