= Fraser Harrison =

English writer

Fraser Harrison is an English writer.

== Biography ==
Harrison published his first novel High on the Hog in 1991, with his second novel Minotaur in Love being published in 2007.

In 2012, he published a historical travel book titled Infinite West: Travels in South Dakota.

== Bibliography ==
- The Yellow Book, Sidgwick and Jackson, London, 1974
- The Dark Angel - Aspects of Victorian Sexuality, Sheldon Press, London, 1977 ISBN 0-85969-094-6
- Strange Land; The Countryside - Myth and Reality, Sidgwick and Jackson, London, 1982
- A Father's Diary, Flamingo, London, 1985
- The Living Landscape, Pluto, London, 1986
- A Winter's Tale, Collins, London, 1987
- Trivial Disputes, Collins, London, 1989
- High on the Hog, Heinemann, London, 1991, ISBN 0-7493-1364-1
- Minotaur in Love, Flambard Press, Hexham, 2007, ISBN 978-1-873226-89-6
- Infinite West: Travels in South Dakota, South Dakota State Historical Society Press, Pierre, SD, 2012, ISBN 978-09846505-8-3
- Portrait of Yankton, South Dakota History, Spring Issue, 2014.
- Duleep Singh's Statue, Signal Books, 2018.
- Poems 2010 - 2022, 2022.
- You And I: Poems 2022, 2023.

Radio Plays:

- Come the Day! (the execution of Ken Saro-Wiwa) Radio 4, 1998
- Voyage of Discovery (based on journals of Lewis and Clark), Radio 3, 2000
