= Sean Farren =

Member of the Northern Ireland Assembly for Antrim North
- In office 25 June 1998 – 7 March 2007
- Preceded by: New Creation
- Succeeded by: Declan O'Loan
- In office 20 October 1982 – 1986
- Preceded by: Assembly re-established
- Succeeded by: Assembly abolished

Northern Ireland Forum Member for North Antrim
- In office 30 May 1996 – 25 April 1998
- Preceded by: New forum
- Succeeded by: Forum dissolved

Personal details
- Born: 6 September 1939 (age 87) Dublin, Republic of Ireland
- Party: SDLP
- Education: University College Dublin; University of Essex; University of Ulster

Sean Nial Farren (born 6 September 1939) is an Irish Social Democratic and Labour Party (SDLP) politician and academic who was a Member of the Northern Ireland Assembly (MLA) for North Antrim from 1998 to 2007.

== Academic career ==
Farren studied at the National University of Ireland, University College Dublin (BA), University of Essex (MA) and the University of Ulster (PhD). He worked as a teacher in Dublin, Switzerland and Sierra Leone before becoming a lecturer at the University of Ulster.

Since 2008 he has been a visiting professor in the School of Education at Ulster University. He has also been involved in a number of projects aimed at strengthening democratic institutions in the Middle East, North Africa, West and East Africa.

He is currently a member of the Governing Authority of Dublin City University, a Trustee of Concern Worldwide (UK), a member of the Standing Committee of the Development Studies Association of Ireland (DSAI) and a committee member of the Sierra Leone Ireland Partnership (SLIP).

== Political career ==
Farren contested the Westminster seat of North Antrim as a member of the Social Democratic and Labour Party (SDLP) at the 1979 general election, and stood at each subsequent general election until 2005.

In 1982, Farren was elected to the Northern Ireland Assembly in North Antrim. In line with SDLP policy, he instead sat on the New Ireland Forum (1983–4).

Farren was elected to the Northern Ireland Forum in 1996, again for North Antrim, and held this seat in the Northern Ireland Assembly in 1998 and 2003, before standing down at the 2007 election.

== Personal ==
He is married to Patricia Clarke. They have four children. He and Patricia live in Portstewart, County Londonderry.

== Publications ==
He has authored, co-authored or edited four books:

- The Politics of Irish Education (1995)
- SDLP – the Struggle for Agreement in Northern Ireland (2010), with Robert Mulvihill
- Paths to a Settlement in Northern Ireland (2000)
- John Hume: Irish Peacemaker (2015) with Denis Haughey.

He has written many book chapters, peer reviewed and other articles. He also wrote the paper Sunningdale: An Agreement Too Soon?, in which the circumstances behind the agreement and the elements that caused its collapse are examined.

Northern Ireland Assembly (1982)
New assembly	MPA for North Antrim; 1982–1986	Assembly abolished
Northern Ireland Forum
New forum	Member for North Antrim; 1996–1998	Forum dissolved
Northern Ireland Assembly
New assembly	MLA for Antrim North; 1998–2007	Succeeded by Declan O'Loan
Political offices
New office	Minister of Higher and Further Education, Training and Employment; 1999–2000	Vacant Office suspended Title next held by self
Vacant Office suspended Title last held by self	Minister of Higher and Further Education, Training and Employment; 2000–2001	Succeeded by Carmel Hanna
Preceded by Mark Durkan	Minister of Finance and Personnel; 2001–2002	Vacant Office suspended Title next held by Peter Robinson
Party political offices
Preceded by Bríd Rodgers	Chairperson of the Social Democratic and Labour Party; 1980–1984	Succeeded by Alban Maginness
