= Night of January 16th =

1934 play by Ayn Rand

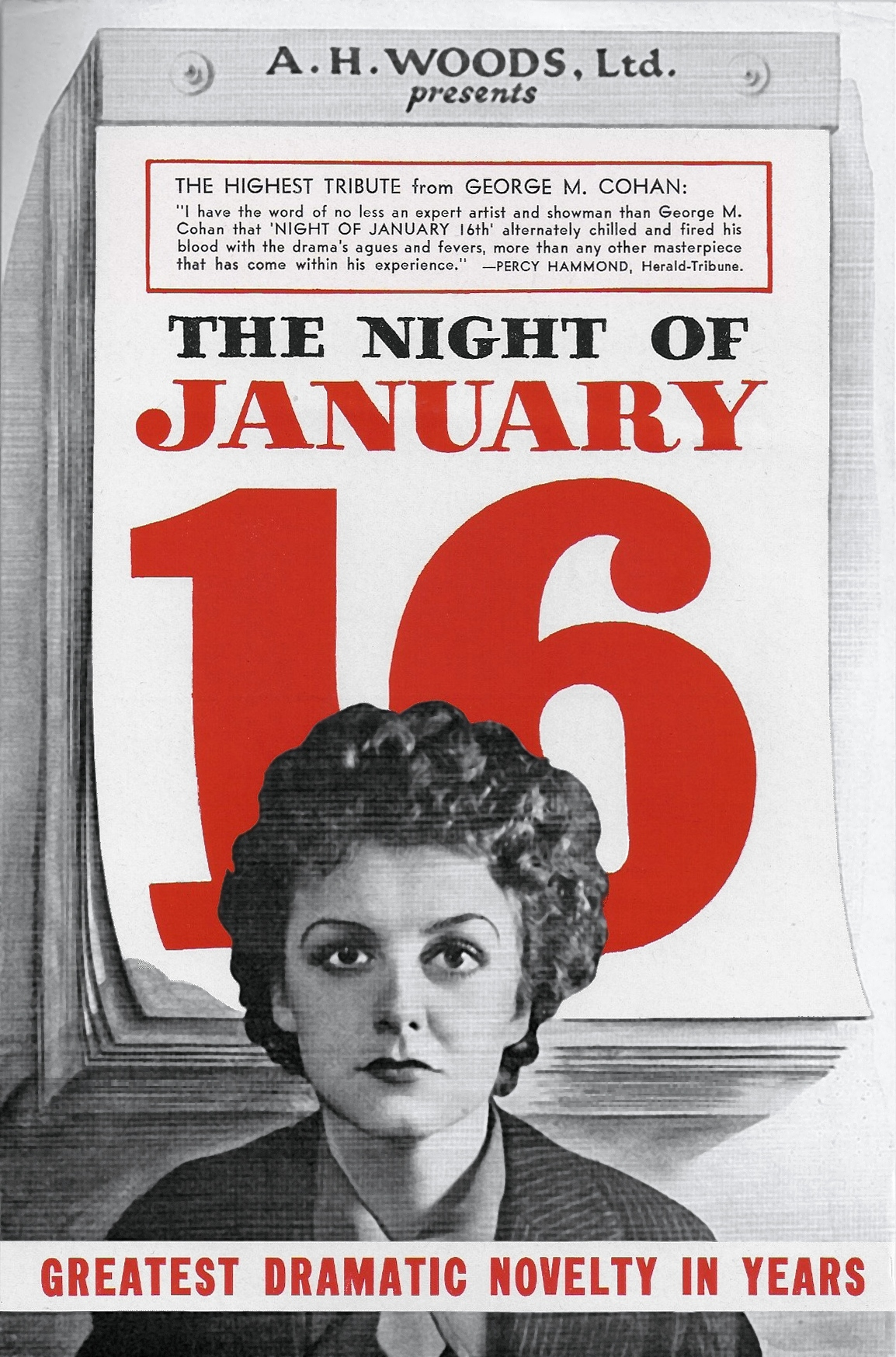
- Flyer for the Broadway production (Doris Nolan pictured)
- Original language: English
- Written by: Ayn Rand
- Characters: Karen Andre; Mr. Stevens; Mr. Flint; Larry "Guts" Regan; more...
- Genre: Courtroom drama
- Setting: A courtroom in New York City

Premiere
- Date: October 22, 1934 (as Woman on Trial)
- Place: Hollywood Playhouse

Night of January 16th (sometimes advertised as The Night of January 16th) is a theatrical play by Russian-born American writer Ayn Rand, inspired by the death of Swedish industrialist Ivar Kreuger. The play is set in a courtroom during a murder trial, and an unusual feature is that members of the audience are chosen to play the jury. The court hears the case of Karen Andre, a former secretary and lover of businessman Bjorn Faulkner who is accused of his murder. The play does not directly portray the events leading to Faulkner's death; instead the jury must rely on character testimony to decide whether Andre is guilty. The play's ending depends on the verdict. Rand's intention was to dramatize a conflict between individualism and conformity, with the jury's verdict revealing which viewpoint they preferred.

The play was first produced in 1934 in Los Angeles under the title Woman on Trial; it received mostly positive reviews and enjoyed moderate commercial success. Producer Al Woods took it to Broadway during the 1935–36 season and re-titled it Night of January 16th. It drew attention for its innovative audience-member jury and became a hit, running for seven months. Doris Nolan, in her Broadway debut, received positive reviews for her portrayal of the lead role. Several regional productions followed. An off-Broadway revival in 1973, under the title Penthouse Legend, was a commercial and critical failure. A film based on the play was released in 1941; the story has also been adapted for television and radio.

Rand had many heated disputes with Woods over script changes he wanted for the Broadway production. Their disputes climaxed in an arbitration hearing when Rand discovered Woods had diverted a portion of her royalties to pay for a script doctor. Rand disliked the changes made for the Broadway production and the version published for amateur productions, so in 1968 she re-edited the script for publication as the "definitive" version.

== History ==
=== Background and first production ===
Rand drew inspiration for Night of January 16th from two sources. The first was The Trial of Mary Dugan, a 1927 melodrama about a showgirl prosecuted for killing her wealthy lover, which gave Rand the idea to write a play featuring a trial. Rand wanted her play's ending to depend on the result of the trial, rather than having a fixed final scene. She based her victim on Swedish industrialist Ivar Kreuger, who was known as the "Match King" for the matchstick-manufacturing monopolies he owned. When Kreuger's business empire became financially unstable, he shot himself on March 12, 1932 after being accused of involvement in potentially illegal financial deals. The incident inspired Rand to make the victim a businessman of great ambition and dubious character, who had given several people motives for his murder.

Rand wrote Night of January 16th in 1933. She was 28 and had been in the United States for seven years after emigrating from the Soviet Union, where her strong anti-Communist opinions had put her at risk. Rand had never written a stage play, but had worked in Hollywood as a junior screenwriter for Cecil B. DeMille, and later in RKO Studios' wardrobe department. In September 1932, Rand sold an original screenplay, Red Pawn, to Universal Studios and quit RKO to finish her first novel, We the Living. She wrote the stage play with the hope of making money from it while finishing her novel. By 1934 her agent was trying to sell the play and the novel, but both were repeatedly rejected. Red Pawn was shelved and Rand's contract for rewrites on it expired. Rand's husband, actor Frank O'Connor, was getting only minor roles with little pay, leaving the couple in financial difficulties. With the last of her money from Red Pawn exhausted, Rand got an offer for her new play from Al Woods, who had produced The Trial of Mary Dugan for Broadway. The contract included a condition that Woods could make changes to the script. Wary that he would destroy her vision of the play to create a more conventional drama, Rand turned Woods down.

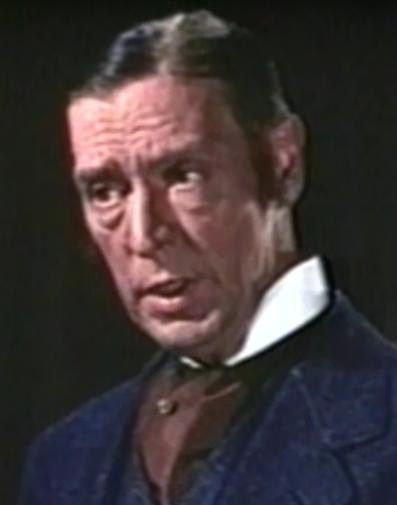
E. E. Clive staged the play as Woman on Trial in 1934.

Soon after she rejected the offer from Woods, Rand accepted an offer from Welsh actor E. E. Clive to stage the play in Los Angeles. It first opened at the Hollywood Playhouse as Woman on Trial; Clive produced, and Barbara Bedford played Andre. The production opened on October 22, 1934, and closed in late November.

=== Broadway production ===
At the end of the play's run in Los Angeles, Woods renewed his offer to produce the play on Broadway. Although he was a renowned producer of many famous plays in a career of more than three decades, Woods had lost much of his fortune in the early 1930s and had not produced a hit in several years. Being refused by a neophyte author shocked him and increased his interest. Woods still wanted the right to make script changes, but he made adjustments to the contract to give Rand more influence. She reluctantly agreed to his terms.

Rand arrived in New York City at the beginning of December 1934 in anticipation of the opening in January 1935. The play's financing failed, delaying the production for several months until Woods arranged new financing from theater owner Lee Shubert. When work resumed, Rand's relationship with Woods quickly soured as he demanded changes she later derided as "a junk heap of worn, irrelevant melodramatic devices". Woods had made his success on Broadway with low-brow melodramas such as Nellie, the Beautiful Cloak Model and risqué comedies such as The Demi-Virgin. Woods was not interested in what he called Rand's "highfalutin speeches", preferring the dramatic conflict to focus on concrete elements, such as whether the defendant had a gun. The changes to Rand's work included the creation of a new character, a gun moll played by Shubert's mistress.

The contract between Woods and Rand allowed him to hire collaborators if he thought it necessary, paying them a limited portion of the author's royalties. He first hired John Hayden to direct, paying him one percentage point from Rand's 10-percent royalty. Although Hayden was a successful Broadway director, Rand disliked him and later called him "a very ratty Broadway hanger-on". As auditions for the play began in Philadelphia, Woods demanded further script changes and was frustrated by Rand's refusal to make some of them. He engaged Louis Weitzenkorn, the author of the previous hit Five Star Final, to act as a script doctor. Rand's relationship with Weitzenkorn was worse than hers with Woods or Hayden; she and Weitzenkorn argued over political differences as well as his ideas for the play. Woods gave Weitzenkorn another percentage point from Rand's royalties without informing her. Rand filed a claim against Woods with the American Arbitration Association; she objected to Weitzenkorn receiving any portion of her royalties, and told the arbitration panel Weitzenkorn had added only a single line to the play, which was cut after the auditions. Upon hearing this testimony, one of the arbitrators responded incredulously, "That was all he did?" In two hearings, the panel ruled that Weitzenkorn should receive his agreed-upon one percent, but that Woods could not deduct the payment from Rand's royalties because she had not been notified in advance. Despite the disputes between Rand and Woods, the play opened at Shubert's Ambassador Theatre on September 16, 1935, where it ran successfully for seven months. It closed on April 4, 1936, after 283 performances.

=== Subsequent productions and publications ===
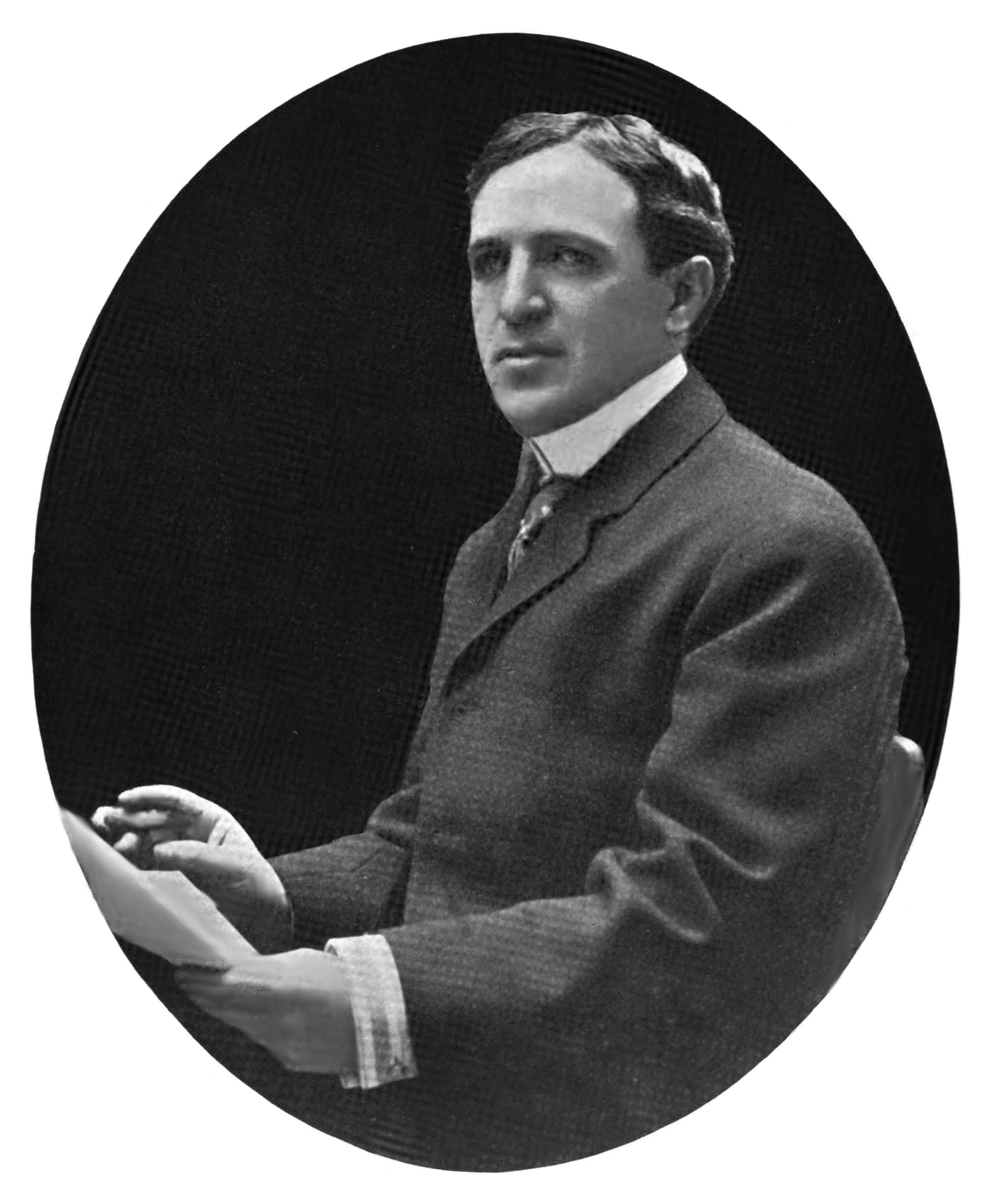
Producer Al Woods brought the play to Broadway in 1935.

When the play's success on Broadway was clear, Woods launched productions of the play in other cities, starting with San Francisco. It opened there at the Geary Theater on December 30, 1935, and ran for five weeks with Nedda Harrigan in the lead role. Harrigan stayed with the show when it moved to the El Capitan Theatre in Los Angeles, where it opened on March 1, 1936. After the Broadway production closed, Woods started a road tour that included productions in Boston and Chicago.

International productions of the play included shows in London, Montreal, and Sydney. The production in London opened on September 29, 1936, where Phoebe Foster took the lead role for her first appearance on the London stage. It closed after 22 performances. A production in Montreal opened on June 16, 1941, starring Fay Wray as Andre and Robert Wilcox as Regan. In Sydney, the play opened at the Minerva Theatre on June 19, 1944, with Thelma Grigg as Andre.

Night of January 16th was first published in an edition for amateur theater organizations in 1936, using a version edited by drama professor Nathaniel Edward Reeid, which included further changes to eliminate elements such as swearing and smoking. Rand disavowed this version because of the changes. In 1960, Rand's protégé Nathaniel Branden asked about doing a public reading of the play for students at the Nathaniel Branden Institute. Rand did not want him to use the amateur version; she created a revised text that eliminated most of Woods' and Reeid's changes. She had her "final, definitive version" published in 1968 with an introduction about the play's history.

In 1972, Rand approved an off-Broadway revival of the play, which used her preferred version of the script, including several dozen further small changes in language beyond those in the 1968 version. The revival also used her original title, Penthouse Legend. It was produced by Phillip and Kay Nolte Smith, a married couple who were friends with Rand. Kay Smith also starred in the production under the stage name Kay Gillian. It opened at the McAlpin Rooftop Theater on February 22, 1973, and closed on March 18 after 30 performances.

Night of January 16th was the last theatrical success for either Rand or Woods. Rand's next play, Ideal, went unsold, and a 1940 stage adaptation of We the Living flopped. Rand achieved lasting success and financial stability with her 1943 novel, The Fountainhead. Woods produced several more plays; none were hits and when he died in 1951, he was bankrupt and living in a hotel.

== Synopsis ==
The plot of Night of January 16th centers on the trial of secretary Karen Andre for the murder of her employer, business executive Bjorn Faulkner, who defrauded his company of millions of dollars to invest in the gold trade. In the wake of a financial crash, he was facing bankruptcy. The play's events occur entirely in a courtroom; Faulkner is never seen. On the night of January 16, Faulkner and Andre were in the penthouse of the Faulkner Building in New York City, when Faulkner apparently fell to his death. Within the three acts, the prosecutor Mr. Flint and Andre's defense attorney Mr. Stevens call witnesses whose testimonies build conflicting stories. (Note: Plot details are primarily based on the version published in 1968, which varies at some points from the scripts used for the Broadway and amateur theater productions.)

At the beginning of the first act, the judge asks the court clerk to call jurors from the audience. Once the jurors are seated, the prosecution argument begins. Flint explains that Andre was not just Faulkner's secretary, but also his lover. He says Faulkner jilted her to marry Nancy Lee Whitfield and fired Andre, motivating Andre to murder him. Flint then calls a series of witnesses, starting with the medical examiner, who testifies that Faulkner's body was so damaged by the fall that it was impossible to determine whether he was killed by the impact or was already dead. An elderly night watchman and a private investigator describe the events they saw that evening. A police inspector testifies to finding a suicide note. Faulkner's very religious housekeeper disapprovingly describes the sexual relationship between Andre and Faulkner, and says she saw Andre with another man after Faulkner's marriage. Nancy Lee testifies about her and Faulkner's courtship and marriage, portraying both as idyllic. The act ends with Andre speaking out of turn to accuse Nancy Lee of lying.

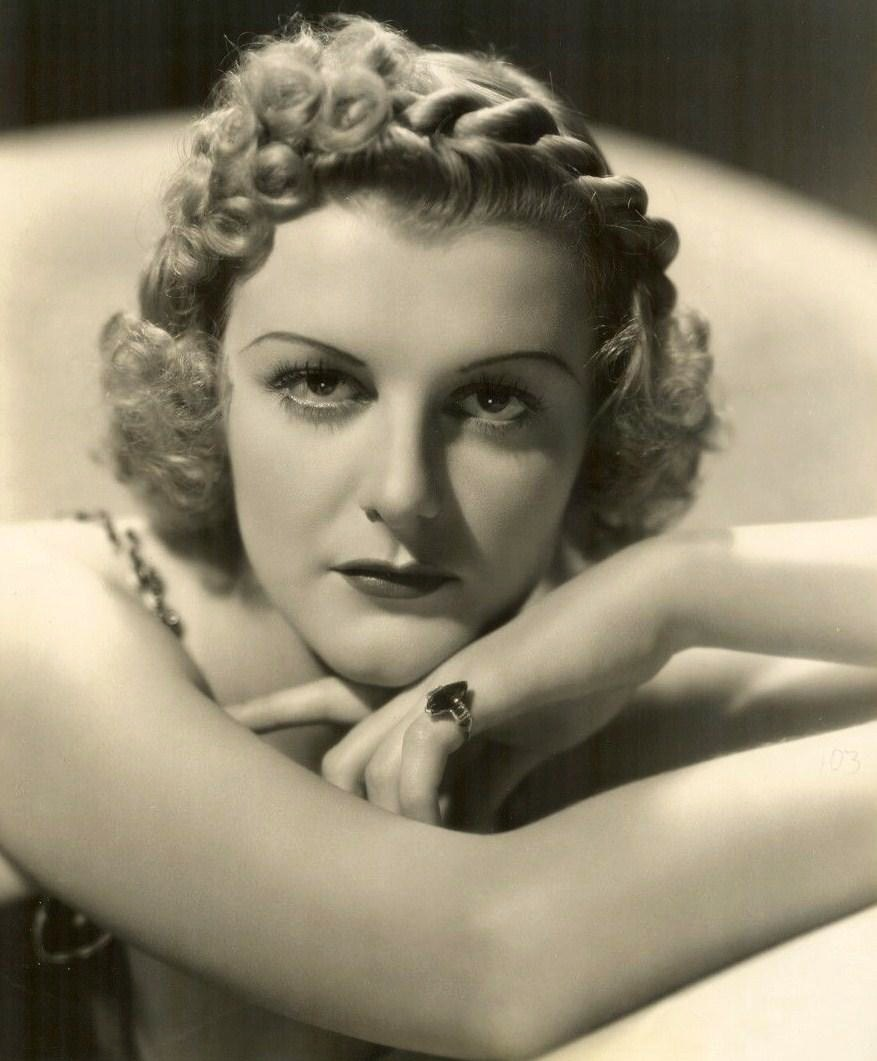
Doris Nolan played Karen Andre on Broadway.

The second act continues the prosecution's case, with Flint calling John Graham Whitfield—Faulkner's father-in-law and president of Whitfield National Bank. He testifies about a large loan he made to Faulkner. In his cross-examination, defense attorney Stevens suggests the loan was used to buy Faulkner's marriage to Whitfield's daughter. After this testimony, the prosecution rests and the defense argument begins. A handwriting expert testifies about the signature on the suicide note. Faulkner's bookkeeper describes events between Andre's dismissal and the night of Faulkner's death, and related financial matters. Andre takes the stand and describes her relationship with Faulkner as both his lover and his partner in financial fraud. She says she did not resent his marriage because it was a business deal to secure credit from the Whitfield Bank. As she starts to explain the reasons for Faulkner's alleged suicide, she is interrupted by the arrival of "Guts" Regan, an infamous gangster, who tells Andre that Faulkner is dead. Despite being on trial for Faulkner's murder, Andre is shocked by this news and faints.

The final act continues Andre's testimony; she is now somber rather than defiant. She says that she, Faulkner, and Regan had conspired to fake Faulkner's suicide so they could escape with money stolen from Whitfield. Regan, who was also in love with Andre, provided the stolen body of his already-dead gang associate, "Lefty" O'Toole, to throw from the building. In cross-examination, Flint suggests Andre and Regan were using knowledge of past criminal activities to blackmail Faulkner. Stevens then calls Regan, who testifies that he was due to meet Faulkner at a getaway plane after leaving the stolen body with Andre; however, Faulkner did not arrive and the plane was missing. Instead of Faulkner, Regan encountered Whitfield, who gave him a check that was, according to Regan, to buy his silence. Regan later found the missing plane, which had been burned with what he presumes is Faulkner's body inside. Flint's cross-examination offers an alternative theory: Regan put the stolen body into the plane to create doubt about Andre's guilt, and the check from Whitfield was protection money to Regan's gang. In the play's Broadway and amateur versions, the next witness is Roberta Van Rensselaer, an exotic dancer and wife of O'Toole, who believes Regan killed her husband. This character does not appear in Rand's preferred version of the play. Stevens then recalls two witnesses to follow up on issues from Regan's testimony. The defense and prosecution then give their closing arguments.

The jury retires to vote while the characters repeat highlights from their testimony under a spotlight. The jury then returns to announce its verdict. One of two short endings follows. If found not guilty, Andre thanks the jury. If found guilty, she says the jury have spared her from committing suicide. In Reeid's amateur version, after either verdict the judge berates the jurors for their bad judgment and declares that they cannot serve on a jury again.

== Title ==
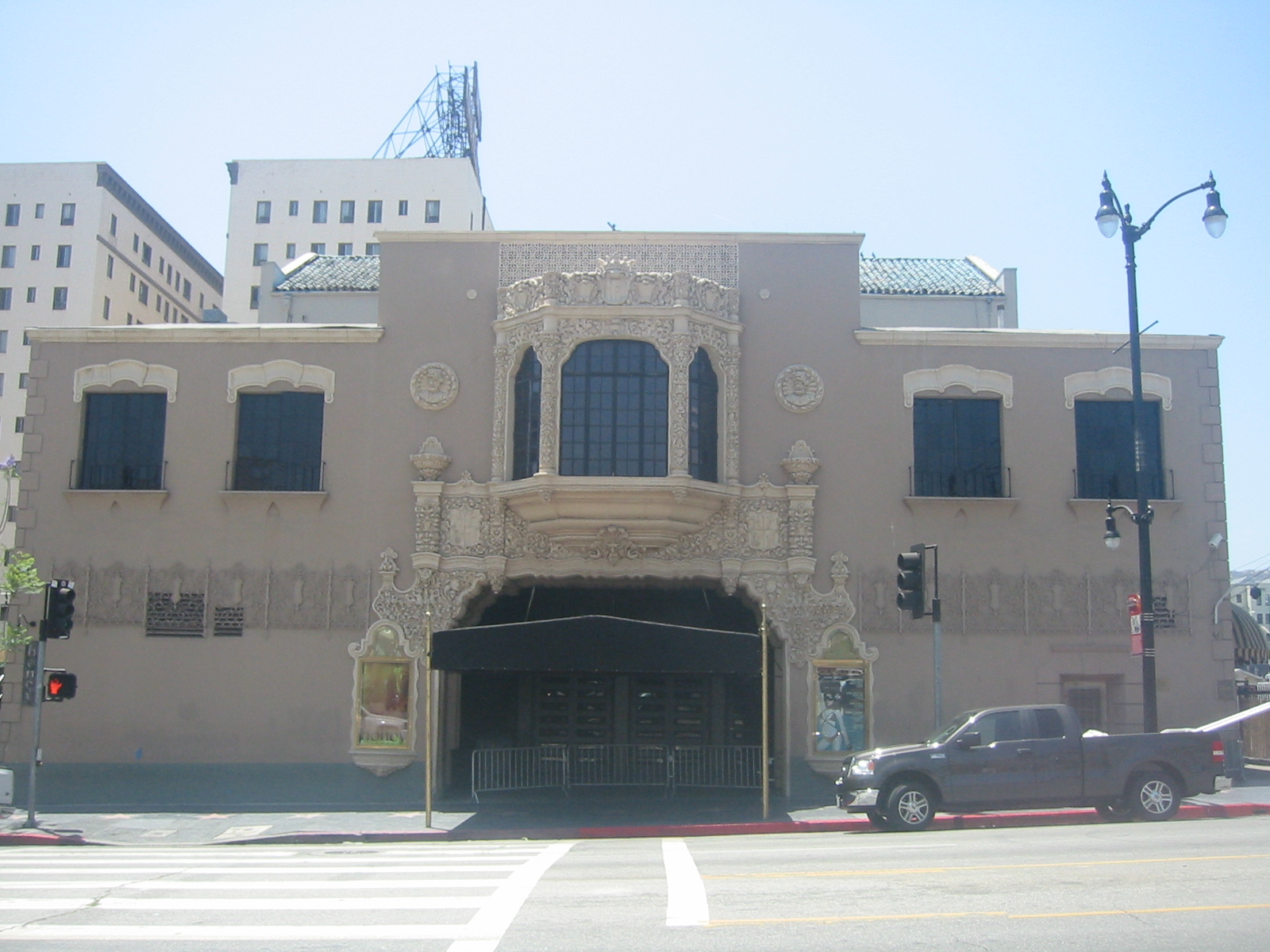
The play appeared as Woman on Trial at the Hollywood Playhouse.

Although best known as Night of January 16th, the play's title changed multiple times and several alternative titles were considered. Rand's working title was Penthouse Legend. When Clive picked up the play, he thought Rand's title suggested a fantasy story that would discourage potential patrons. The play was called The Verdict during the Hollywood Playhouse rehearsals, but opened there with the title Woman on Trial. When Woods took the play to Broadway, he insisted on a new title. He offered Rand a choice between The Black Sedan and Night of January 16th. Rand liked neither, but picked the latter. Woods later suggested two more name changes, but did not implement them. Prior to the opening, he considered renaming the play The Night is Young. After the play opened, he considered changing its name each day to match the current date.

When Rand published her version of the play in 1968, she wrote that although she disliked the Broadway title, it was too well known to change it again. She agreed to using Penthouse Legend as the title for the 1973 revival production.

== Broadway cast and characters ==
The play's protagonist and lead female role is the defendant, Karen Andre. Woods considered several actresses for the role, but with Rand's support he cast an unusual choice, an actress named Doris Nolan. It was Nolan's Broadway debut; her previous professional acting experience was a failed attempt at completing a movie scene. At 17 years old, she was cast as a presumably older femme fatale. Woods was Nolan's manager and got a commission from her contract. Nolan was inexperienced and was nervous throughout rehearsals. When other actresses visited, she feared they were there to replace her. Although Rand later said she was "not a sensational actress", reviewers praised her performance. Nolan left the cast in March to take a movie contract from Universal Studios.

Rand actively pushed for Walter Pidgeon to be cast in the role of "Guts" Regan. Woods objected at first, but eventually gave Pidgeon the part. As with Nolan, reviewers approved the choice. Pidgeon left the production after about a month to take a role in another play, There's Wisdom in Women. Despite Rand's objections, he was replaced with William Bakewell; Rand recommended Morgan Conway, who played the same role in Woman on Trial.

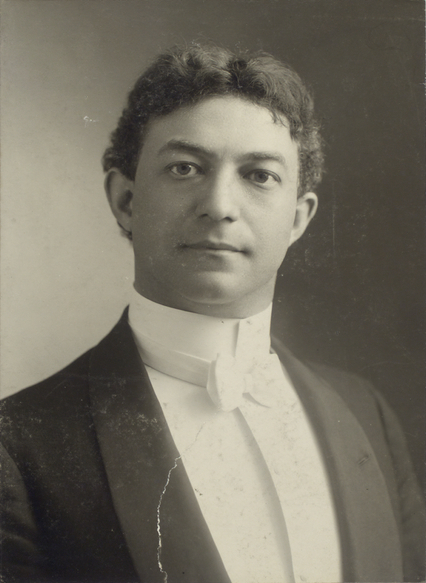
Edmund Breese played District Attorney Flint in the Broadway production.

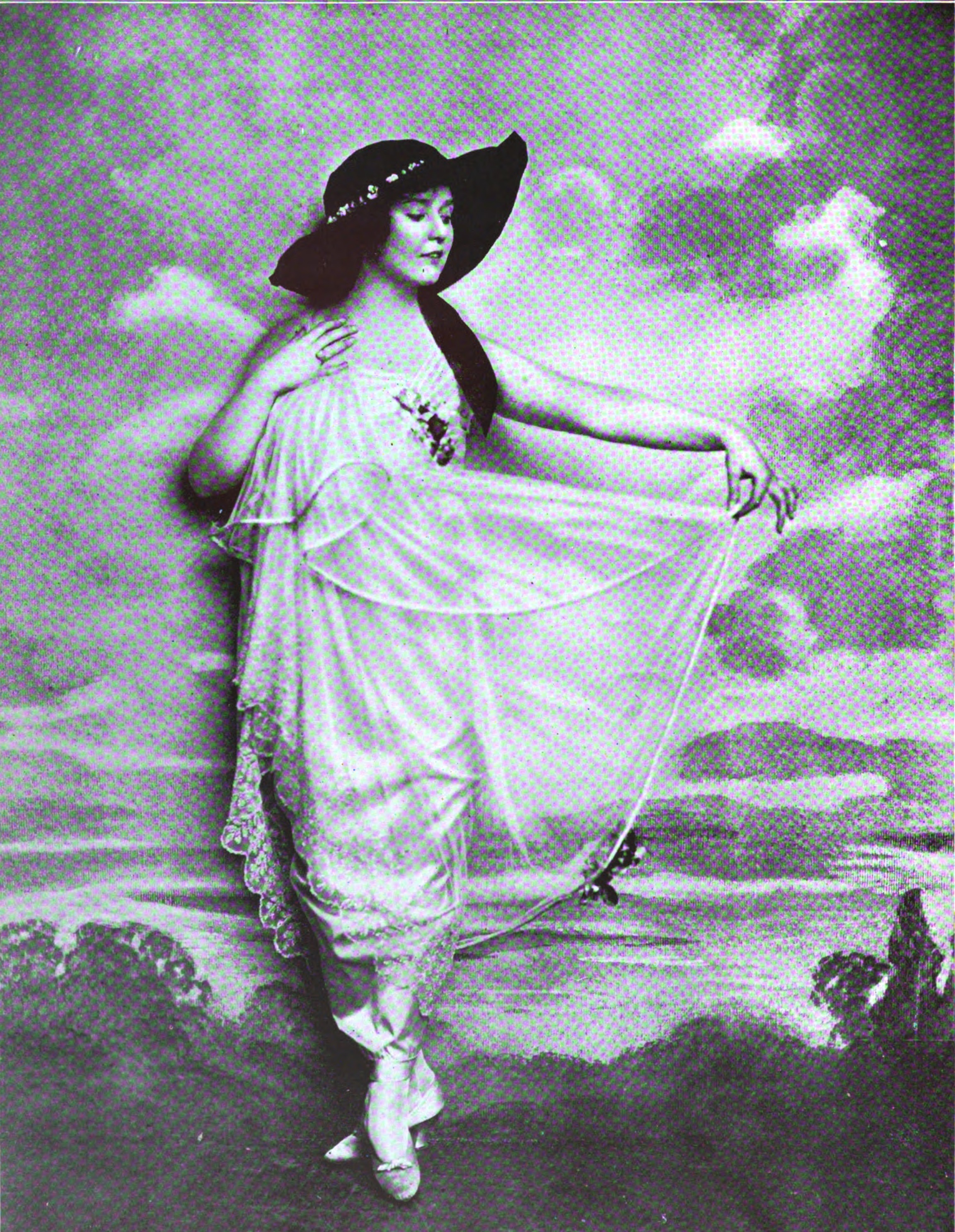
Phoebe Foster appeared as Karen Andre in her London stage debut.

Cast of the Broadway production of Night of January 16th (in speaking order)
Character	Broadway cast	Other notable performers
Bailiff	Donald Oliver	
Judge Heath	J. Arthur Young	
District Attorney Flint	Edmund Breese	Arthur Loft (Woman on Trial); Grandon Rhodes (1936 London production)
Defense Attorney Stevens	Robert Shayne	Boyd Irwin (Woman on Trial)
Clerk of Court	George Anderson	
Dr. Kirkland	Edward Wing	
John Hutchins	Calvin Thomas	
Karen Andre	Doris Nolan (September 1935 – March 1936); Ruth Matteson (March–April 1936)	Barbara Bedford (Woman on Trial); Phoebe Foster (1936 London production); Fay Wray (1941 Montreal production); Thelma Grigg (1944 Sydney production); Kay Nolte Smith (Penthouse Legend)
Homer Van Fleet	Harry Short	
Elmer Sweeney	Leo Kennedy	E. E. Clive (Woman on Trial)
Magda Svenson	Sarah Padden	
Nancy Lee Faulkner	Verna Hillie	Mozelle Britton (Woman on Trial)
John Graham Whitfield	Clyde Fillmore	
James Chandler	Maurice Morris	
Siegurd Jungquist	Arthur Pierson	Don Beddoe (1936 London production)
Larry "Guts" Regan	Walter Pidgeon (September–October 1935); William Bakewell (October 1935 – April 1936)	Morgan Conway (Woman on Trial); Robert Wilcox (1941 Montreal production)
Roberta Van Rensselaer	Marcella Swanson	

== Dramatic analysis ==
=== Jury element ===
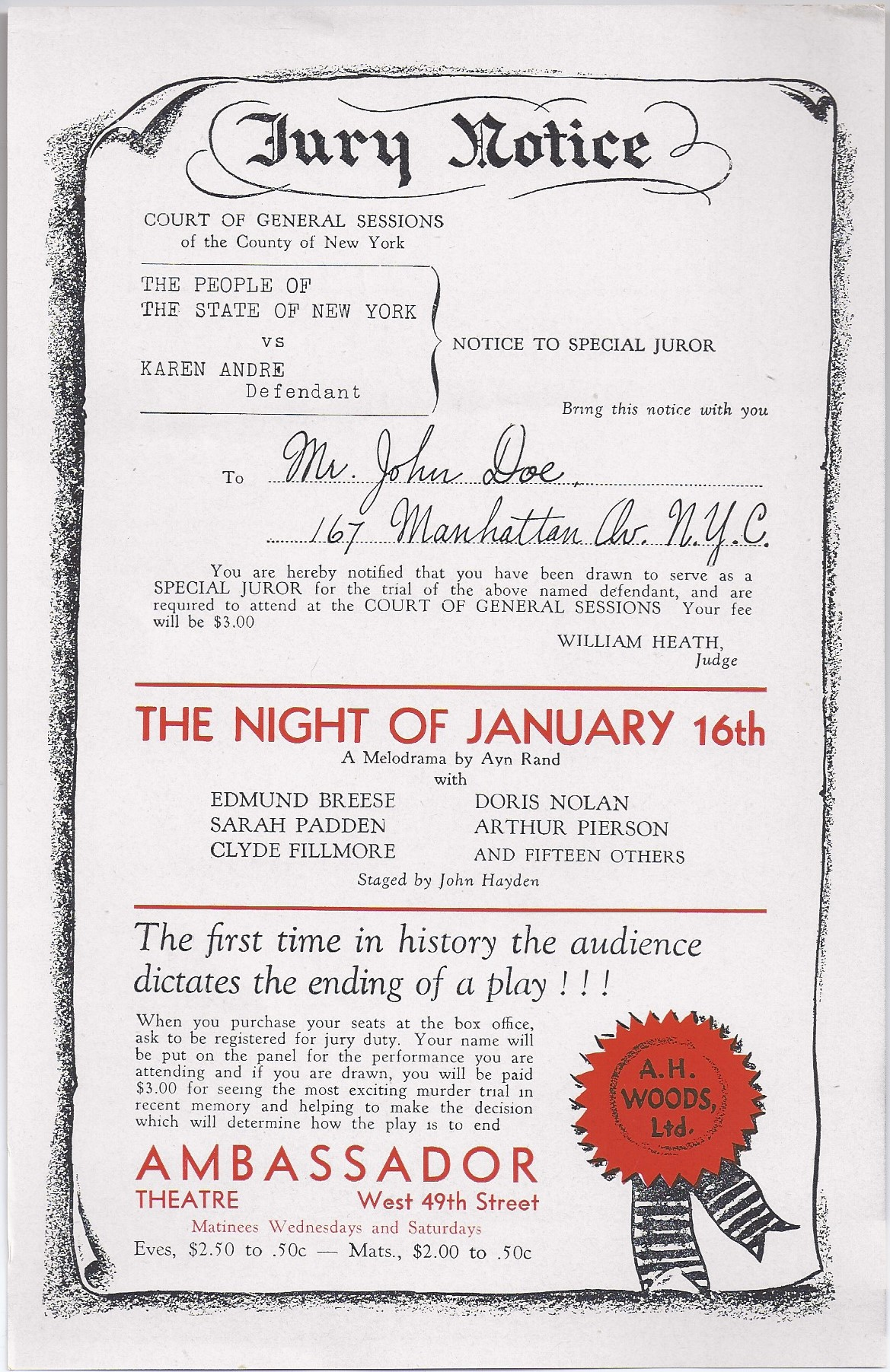
Advertisements invited patrons to join the play's jury.

The selection of a jury from the play's audience was the primary dramatic innovation of Night of January 16th. It created concerns among many of the producers who considered and rejected the play. Although Woods liked the idea, Hayden worried it would destroy the theatrical illusion; he feared audience members might refuse to participate. Successful jury selections during previews indicated this would not be a problem. This criticism dissipated following the play's success; it became famous for its "jury gimmick".

The play's jury has sometimes enlisted famous participants; the Broadway selections were rigged to call on celebrities known to be in the audience. The jury for the Broadway opening included attorney Edward J. Reilly—who was known from the Lindbergh kidnapping trial earlier that year—and boxing champion Jack Dempsey. At a special performance for the blind, Helen Keller sat on the jury. The practice of using celebrity jurors continued throughout the Broadway run and in other productions. (Note: Jurors for subsequent Broadway performances included actors Ricardo Cortez, Fania Marinoff, Chester Morris, Margaret Wycherly, and Roland Young; attorneys Dudley Field Malone and Samuel Leibowitz; baseball player Babe Ruth; bridge player Ely Culbertson; director Eddie Buzzell; and James Roosevelt—son of President Franklin Roosevelt. The jurors for the London opening included musician Jack Hylton and actors Adrianne Allen, Raymond Massey, and Vera Pearce. Opening night jurors in Sydney included cartoonist Jimmy Bancks, tennis champion Jack Crawford, writer Ethel Knight Kelly, and attorneys Bill Dovey, Vernon Treatt, and Richard Windeyer.)

Woods decided the jury for the Broadway run would employ some jury service rules of the New York courts. One such rule was the payment of jurors three dollars per day for their participation, which meant the selected audience members profited by at least 25 cents after subtracting the ticket price. Another was that only men could serve on a jury, although Woods made exceptions, for example at the performance Keller attended. He later loosened the rule to allow women jurors at matinee performances twice a week. Unlike a normal criminal trial, verdicts required only a majority vote rather than unanimity.

=== Themes ===
Rand described Night of January 16th as "a sense-of-life play". She did not want its events to be taken literally, but to be understood as a representation of different ways of approaching life. Andre represents an ambitious, confident, non-conformist approach to life, while the prosecution witnesses represent conformity, envy of success, and the desire for power over others. Rand believed the jury's decision at each performance revealed the attitude of the jurors towards these two conflicting senses of life. Rand supported individualism and considered Andre "not guilty". She said she wanted the play to convey the viewpoint: "Your life, your achievement, your happiness, your person are of paramount importance. Live up to your highest vision of yourself no matter what the circumstances you might encounter. An exalted view of self-esteem is man's most admirable quality". She said the play "is not a philosophical treatise on morality" and represents this view only in a basic way. Rand would later expound an explicit philosophy, which she called "Objectivism", particularly in her 1957 novel Atlas Shrugged and in non-fiction essays, but Night of January 16th predates these more philosophical works.

Several later commentators have interpreted the play as a reflection of Rand's early interest in the ideas of German philosopher Friedrich Nietzsche. Literature professor Shoshana Milgram saw elements of Nietzsche's morality in the descriptions of Bjorn Faulkner, who "never thought of things as right or wrong". Others found significance in Rand's admiration of the play's criminal characters. Historian Jennifer Burns said Rand "found criminality an irresistible metaphor for individualism" because of the influence on her of "Nietzsche's transvaluation of values [that] changed criminals into heroes". Rand maintained criminality was not the important attribute of the characters; she said a criminal could serve as "an eloquent symbol" of independence and rebellion against conformity, but stated, "I do not think, nor did I think when I wrote this play, that a swindler is a heroic character or that a respectable banker is a villain". Rand biographer Ronald Merrill dismissed this explanation as a cover-up for the play's promotion of Nietzschean ideas that Rand later rejected. He called the play "a powerful and eloquent plea for the Nietzschean worldview" of the superiority of the "superman"; this is represented by Faulkner, whom Merrill interprets as rejecting external moral authority and the "slave morality" of ordinary people. Biographer Anne Heller said Rand "later renounced her romantic fascination with criminals", making the characters' criminality an embarrassment for her.

== Reception ==
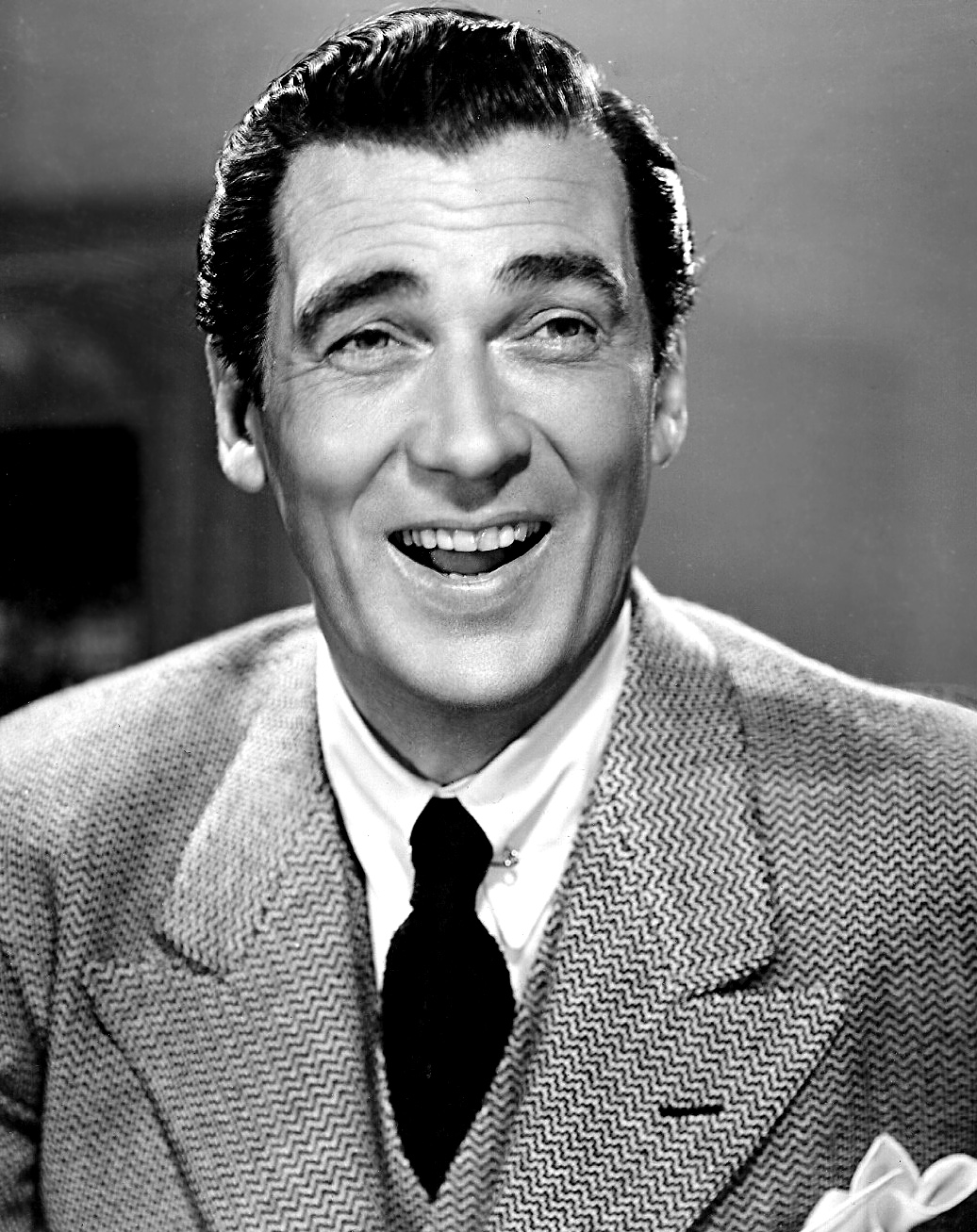
Walter Pidgeon received positive reviews for playing "Guts" Regan in the Broadway production.

Since its premiere, Night of January 16th has had a mixed reception. The initial Los Angeles run as Woman on Trial received complimentary reviews; Rand was disappointed that reviews focused on the play's melodrama and its similarity to The Trial of Mary Dugan, while paying little attention to aspects she considered more important, such as the contrasting ideas of individualism and conformity. Although Rand later described the production as "badly handicapped by lack of funds" and "competent, but somewhat unexciting", it performed reasonably well at the box office during its short run.

The Broadway production received largely positive reviews that praised its melodrama and the acting of Nolan and Pidgeon. Commonweal described it as "well constructed, well enough written, admirably directed ... and excellently acted". The Brooklyn Daily Eagle said the action came in "fits and starts", but praised the acting and the novelty of the use of a jury. New York Post critic John Mason Brown said the play had some flaws, but was an exciting, above-average melodrama. Brooks Atkinson gave it a negative review in The New York Times, calling it "the usual brew of hokum". A review from Theatre Arts Monthly was also dismissive, calling the play a "fashionable game" that would be "fun in a parlor" but seemed "pretty foolish" on stage. Some reviews focused on Woods as the source of the play's positive attributes because he had had many previous theatrical successes. Time said Woods was repeating a successful formula from The Trial of Mary Dugan. Reviews that praised these elements were an embarrassment to Rand, who considered Woods' changes to be negative. Again, reviewers ignored the broader themes that Rand considered important.

Professional productions in other North American cities typically received positive reviews. Austin B. Fenger described the production at San Francisco's Geary Theater as "darned good theater" that was "well acted" and "crisply written". Charles Collins said the Chicago production was "a first class story" that was "well acted by an admirably selected cast". Thomas Archer's review of the Montreal production described it as "realistic" and "absorbing".

The London production in 1936 received mostly positive reviews but was not a commercial success. A reviewer for The Times praised Foster's performance as "tense and beautiful". In The Daily Telegraph, reviewer W. A. Darlington said the show would be popular with audiences, but the production ended its run in less than a month. The review in The Glasgow Herald described it as a "strong, quick thriller", but with inferior dialog to The Trial of Mary Dugan. The reviewer for The Spectator was more critical, saying the play itself was "strong", but was undermined by "mediocre playing" from "bad actors".

The 1973 revival as Penthouse Legend was a failure and received strongly negative reviews. A reviewer for The Village Voice complimented the story's melodramatic plot twists but said it was "preposterously badly written" and described the production as "conventional and obvious". In The New York Times, Clive Barnes called the play tedious and said the acting was "not particularly good". It closed within a few weeks.

Academics and biographers reviewing the play have also expressed mixed opinions. Theater scholar Gerald Bordman declared it "an unexceptional courtroom drama" made popular by the jury element, although he noted praise for the acting of Breese and Pidgeon. Historian James Baker described Rand's presentation of courtroom behavior as unrealistic, but said audiences forgive this because the play's dramatic moments are "so much fun". He said the play was "great entertainment" that is "held together by an enormously attractive woman and a gimmick", but "it is not philosophy" and fails to convey the themes Rand had in mind. Jennifer Burns expressed a similar view, stating that the play's attempts to portray individualism had "dubious results ... Rand intended Bjorn Faulkner to embody heroic individualism, but in the play he comes off as little more than an unscrupulous businessman with a taste for rough sex". Literature scholar Mimi Reisel Gladstein described the play as "significant for dramatic ingenuity and thematic content". Rand biographer Anne Heller considered it "engaging, if stilted", while Ronald Merrill described it as "a skillfully constructed drama" undercut by "Rand's peculiar inability to write an effective mystery plot without leaving holes". Mystery critic Marvin Lachman noted the novelty of the use of a jury but called the play unrealistic with "stilted dialogue" and "stereotypical characters".

== Adaptations ==
=== Movies ===
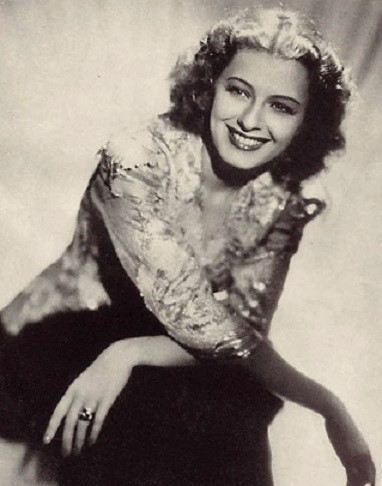
Ellen Drew starred in the 1941 movie adaptation.

The movie rights to Night of January 16th were initially purchased by Metro-Goldwyn-Mayer (MGM) in October 1934 as a possible vehicle for Loretta Young. They hired Rand to write a screenplay, but the project was scrapped. After MGM's option expired, Woods considered making a movie version through a production company of his own, but in 1938 RKO Pictures bought the rights for $10,000 (equivalent to $230,000 in 2025), a fee split between Woods and Rand. RKO considered Claudette Colbert and Lucille Ball as possible stars, but they also gave up on the adaptation. The rights were resold to Paramount Pictures in July 1939 for $35,000 (equivalent to $810,000 in 2025). Paramount released a movie in 1941; Rand did not participate in the production. The film was directed by William Clemens, and Delmer Daves, Robert Pirosh, and Eve Greene were engaged to prepare a new screenplay.

The new screenplay altered the plot significantly, focusing on Steve Van Ruyle (Robert Preston), a sailor who inherits a position on the board of a company headed by Bjorn Faulkner (Nils Asther). Unlike the play, in which Faulkner is already dead, he appears in the film as a living character who is apparently murdered. Suspicion falls on Faulkner's secretary Kit Lane (Ellen Drew); Van Ruyle decides to investigate the alleged crime. Faulkner is discovered hiding in Cuba after faking his own death. Rand said only a single line from her original dialog appeared in the movie, which she dismissed as a "cheap, trashy vulgarity". The film received little attention when it was released, and most reviews of it were negative.

In 1989, Gawaahi, a Hindi-language adaptation of Night of January 16th was released. Indian actress Zeenat Aman led a cast that included Shekhar Kapur and Ashutosh Gowariker.

=== Television and radio ===
Night of January 16th was adapted for several television anthology series in the 1950s and 1960s. The first was WOR-TV's Broadway Television Theatre, which aired its adaptation on July 14, 1952, with a cast that included Neil Hamilton and Virginia Gilmore. On CBS, the Lux Video Theatre presented a version of Night of January 16th on May 10, 1956, starring Phyllis Thaxter as Andre. In the United Kingdom, Maxine Audley took the lead role for an ITV Play of the Week broadcast on January 12, 1960; Cec Linder played the district attorney. The broadcast had been scheduled for October 6, 1959, but was delayed to avoid its possible interpretation as political commentary before the general election held later that week. A radio adaptation of the play was broadcast on the BBC Home Service on August 4, 1962.

== See also ==
- The Match King, a movie also inspired by Ivar Kreuger
- Theater in the United States
