= A. H. Woods =

American theatrical producer (1870–1951)

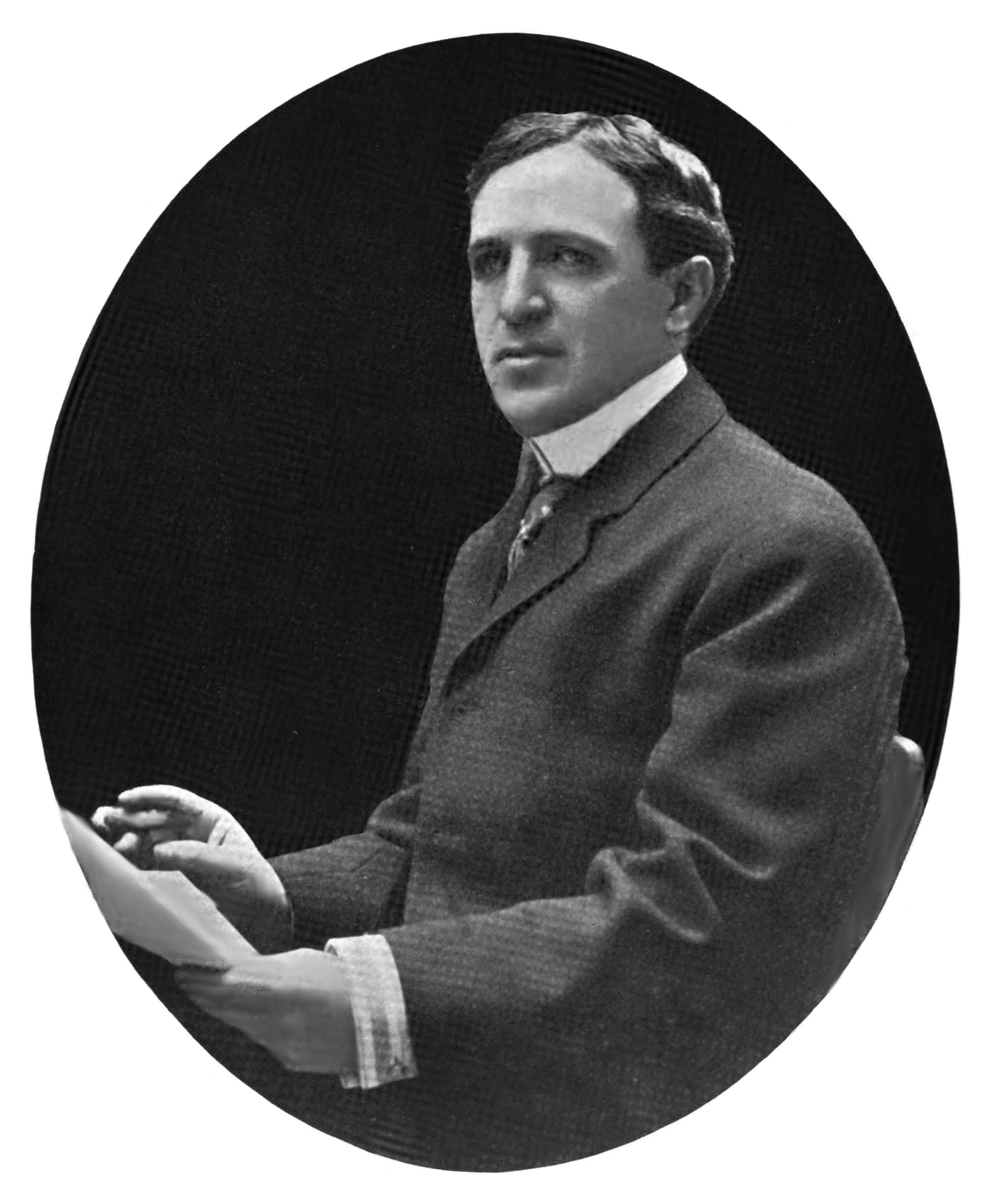
- A. H. Woods in 1909
- Born: Aladore Herman; January 3, 1870; Budapest, Austria-Hungary
- Died: April 24, 1951 (aged 81); New York City, United States
- Occupation: Theatrical producer
- Years active: 1903–1943

Albert Herman Woods (born Aladore Herman; January 3, 1870 – April 24, 1951) was an American theatrical producer. He produced over 140 plays on Broadway, including some of the most successful shows of the period, sometimes under the name of the production company Al Woods Ltd. Woods built the Eltinge Theatre on Broadway, named for one of his most successful and profitable stars, the female impersonator Julian Eltinge.

== Early life ==
Woods was born in Budapest, Hungary, to a Jewish family, but his family brought him to the United States as an infant. He grew up on the Lower East Side of Manhattan. As a child he would skip school to go to theatrical shows, where he developed the goal of becoming a producer himself.

== Career ==
Woods formed an early partnership with Sam H. Harris and Paddy Sullivan, running tour companies of popular melodramas, starting with The Bowery After Dark. His first Broadway production was The Evil That Men Do in 1903. His work on Broadway escalated after the popularity of the touring melodramas declined. Woods had a stable of favorite playwrights, most notably Owen Davis, who he worked with for several years on melodramas such as Nellie, the Beautiful Cloak Model. When Woods turned to producing regular Broadway shows, he focused on bedroom farces, starting with The Girl from Rector's in 1909.

During a trip to Europe in 1911 he bought the US rights to the world's first full-color feature film, The Miracle. which eventually premiered in New York 1913. Also in 1911 he starting building the Eltinge Theatre on 42nd Street, named after his star, Julian Eltinge. By May 1911 a run of The Fascinating Widow starring Eltinge at the Boston Theatre was expected to have receipts of $500,000 by the time it finished.

From c. 1912 he took over the leases of a large number of Berlin theatres including what became the Ufa-Palast am Zoo, to put on 'Kino-Vaudeville' shows (a mix of variety acts imported from the US interspersed with silent films). He was also involved with the American millionaire Joe Goldsoll in the building of the German capital's first free-standing purpose-built cinema, the Ufa-Pavillon am Nollendorfplatz."

When he became successful, Woods continued to emphasize his humble roots and was known for his folksy manner with everyone. He greeted patrons at the Eltinge as "sweetheart". Upon being introduced to King George V, Woods addressed the monarch (who was older than him) as "kid" and took the opportunity to promote one of his productions, declaring it to be "a regular show".

Woods was at his peak in the 1920s, producing such hits as Ladies' Night (1920), The Demi-Virgin (1921), The Green Hat (1925), The Shanghai Gesture (1926) (filmed in 1941), and The Trial of Mary Dugan (1927). However, he lost most of his fortune in the early 1930s and never fully recovered. In the 1930s his only major hits were Five Star Final (1930) and Night of January 16th (1935). When Woods staged the Sheldon Davis comedy Try and Get It in August 1943, critics expressed hope that it would revive his flagging career, but it closed in less than a week. It was his final production.

== Later life ==
Although Woods continued to read scripts and attempt to generate interest, he was unable to stage any productions after 1943. He died on April 24, 1951, in his residence at the Hotel Beacon in New York. The once wealthy former producer ended his life bankrupt. After a memorial service attended by many prominent theater personalities, his remains were cremated.

== Censorship battles ==
Woods produced a number of bedroom farces, which critics and local authorities often saw as pushing the boundaries of propriety. In several instances Woods encountered legal troubles as a result.

=== The Girl from Rector's ===
In 1909, Woods staged The Girl from Rector's, Paul M. Potter's adaptation of Loute, a French farce by Pierre Veber. The plot portrays several couples in a tangle of adulterous affairs, and the play was considered indecent by many critics. Prior to opening on Broadway, preview performances were scheduled in Trenton, New Jersey. After the first matinee, a group of 25 local clergy complained to Trenton police the play was immoral. The police shut the play down and did not permit any further performances.

=== The Girl with the Whooping Cough ===
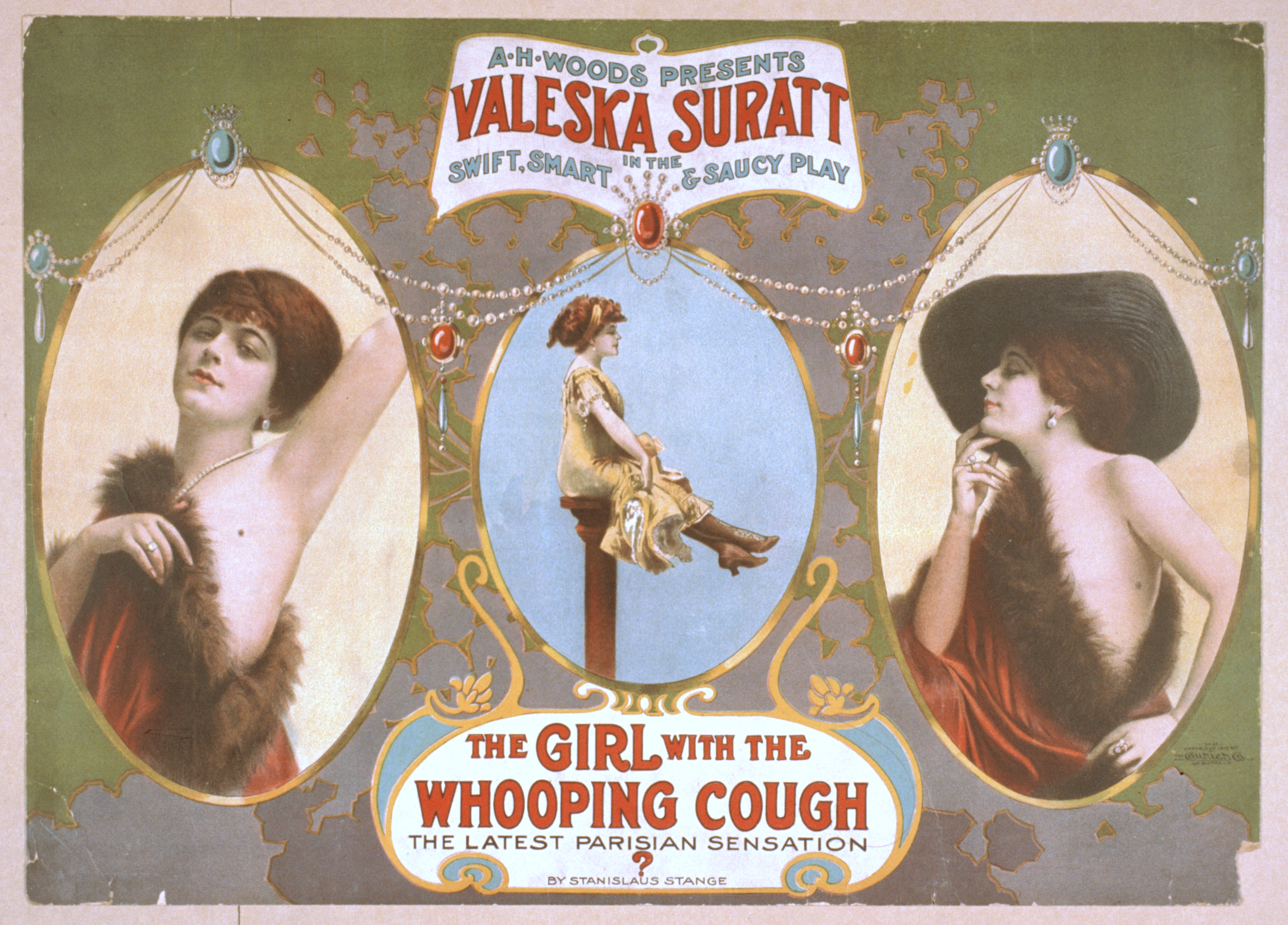
Woods was forced to close his production of The Girl with the Whooping Cough.

In April 1910, Woods began a production of The Girl with the Whooping Cough, an adaptation of a French farce that features a woman who spreads whooping cough by kissing numerous men. At the urging of New York Mayor William Jay Gaynor, the New York City Police Commissioner attempted to suppress the play due to its risqué content. The commissioner contacted the theater's management company and threatened that if the play was not stopped, he would refuse to renew the theater's operating license. Woods got an injunction from the New York Supreme Court that prevented the authorities from interfering with the show directly, but it did not compel them to renew the license for the theater. Left with no home for his production, Woods was forced to shut it down.

=== The Demi-Virgin ===
In 1921, Woods again encountered problems with New York City censors when he produced The Demi-Virgin, a sex comedy written by Avery Hopwood that featured risque dialogue and a strip poker scene. On November 3, 1921, Woods and Hopwood were called to the chambers of William McAdoo, the Chief Magistrate of the New York City's magistrates' court, to respond to complaints about the play. Woods would not make any changes to address the complaints, so McAdoo held a formal hearing and ruled that the play was obscene, describing it as "coarsely indecent, flagrantly and suggestively immoral, impure in word and action." Woods was placed on bail, and the case was sent to the grand jury for an indictment on a misdemeanor charge of staging an obscene exhibition. The grand jury heard the case on December 23, 1921, but dismissed it that same day, even though it had heard only witnesses favoring the prosecution. As the obscenity case proceeded, the city's Commissioner of Licenses threatened to revoke the theater's operating license if the production continued, but a New York state appeals court ruled that he did not have the legal authority to revoke a theater license once it had been granted.

Although Woods won the legal proceedings and the play was a hit, it was considered immoral by many critics. Woods was personally condemned by prominent rabbi Stephen S. Wise, who said the involvement of a Jewish producer with "theatrical filth" hurt the reputation of Jews generally.

== Broadway productions ==
Woods produced over 140 plays on Broadway.

List of Broadway productions by Albert H. Woods
Title	Author	Theater	Opened	Closed
The Evil That Men Do	Theodore Kremer	American Theatre	August 29, 1903	Not known
The Errand Boy	George Totten Smith (book); Edward P. Moran (lyrics)	Haverly's 14th Street Theatre	October 31, 1904	November 5, 1904
Tom, Dick and Harry	Aaron Hoffman and Harry Williams	Multiple	September 25, 1905	January 20, 1906
Chinatown Charlie	Owen Davis	American Theatre	March 5, 1906	Not known
The Gambler of the West	Owen Davis	American Theatre	July 28, 1906	Not known
A Marked Woman	Owen Davis	West End Theatre	December 10, 1906	Not known
Nellie, the Beautiful Cloak Model	Owen Davis	West End Theatre	December 31, 1906	Not known
The King and Queen of Gamblers	Owen Davis	American Theatre	July 27, 1907	Not known
A Race Across the Continent	John Oliver	Thalia Theatre	July 27, 1907	August 3, 1907
A Chorus Girl's Luck in New York	Owen Davis	Haverly's 14th Street Theatre	August 3, 1907	Not known
Convict 999	John Oliver	Thalia Theatre	August 5, 1907	Not known
The Great Express Robbery	Owen Davis	American Theatre	August 12, 1907	Not known
Edna, the Pretty Typewriter	John Oliver	American Theatre	August 26, 1907	Not known
Broadway After Dark	John Oliver	Thalia Theatre	September 9, 1907	October 5, 1907
Since Nellie Went Away	Owen Davis	American Theatre	October 28, 1907	Not known
Deadwood Dick's Last Shot	Owen Davis	Haverly's 14th Street Theatre	December 23, 1907	Not known
The Girl from Rector's	Paul M. Potter	Weber's Music Hall	February 1, 1909	July 1909
The Girl with the Whooping Cough	Stanislaus Stange	New York Theatre	April 25, 1910	May 9, 1910
New York	William J. Hurlbut	Bijou Theatre	October 17, 1910	October 1910
The Girl in the Taxi	Stanislaus Stange	Astor Theatre	October 24, 1910	December 3, 1910
The Fascinating Widow	Otto Hauerbach	Liberty Theatre (September–October); Grand Opera House (November)	September 11, 1911	November 1911
Gypsy Love	Harry B. Smith and Robert B. Smith	Globe Theatre	October 17, 1911	November 11, 1911
The Littlest Rebel	Edward Peple	Liberty Theatre	November 14, 1911	January 1912
Modest Suzanne	Harry B. Smith and Robert B. Smith	Liberty Theatre	January 1, 1912	January 20, 1912
Tantalizing Tommy	Michael Morton and Paul Gavault (book); Adrian Ross (lyrics)	Criterion Theatre	October 1, 1912	October 26, 1912
The Woman Haters	George V. Hobart	Astor Theatre	October 7, 1912	November 2, 1912
Potash and Perlmutter	Montague Glass and Charles Klein	George M. Cohan's Theatre	August 16, 1913	September 1915
The Yellow Ticket	Michael Morton	Eltinge 42nd Street Theatre	January 20, 1914	June 1914
The Crinoline Girl	Otto Hauerbach (book); Julian Eltinge (lyrics)	Knickerbocker Theatre (March–May); Standard Theatre (December)	March 16, 1914	December 1914
The High Cost of Loving	Frank Mandel	Theatre Republic (August); 39th Street Theatre (November)	August 25, 1914	Not known
Innocent	George Broadhurst	Eltinge 42nd Street Theatre	September 9, 1914	December 1914
He Comes Up Smiling	Byron Ongley and Emil Nyitray	Liberty Theatre	September 16, 1914	November 1914
Kick In	Willard Mack	Longacre Theatre (October); Theatre Republic (November–March)	October 15, 1914	March 1915
Big Jim Garrity	Owen Davis	New York Theatre	October 16, 1914	November 1914
The Song of Songs	Edward Sheldon	Eltinge 42nd Street Theatre	December 22, 1914	June 1915
Common Clay	Cleves Kinkead	Theatre Republic	August 26, 1915	May 1916
Cousin Lucy	Charles Klein (book); Schuyler Greene (lyrics)	George M. Cohan's Theatre	August 27, 1915	October 2, 1915
The Duke of Killicrankie (revival) / Rosalind	Robert Marshall / James M. Barrie	Lyceum Theatre	September 2, 1915	September 1915
See My Lawyer	Max Marcin	Eltinge 42nd Street Theatre	September 2, 1915	September 1915
Abe and Mawruss	Roi Cooper Megrue and Montague Glass	Lyric Theatre	October 21, 1915	April 1916
Cheating Cheaters	Max Marcin	Eltinge 42nd Street Theatre	August 9, 1916	April 14, 1917
His Bridal Night	Lawrence Rising and Margaret Mayo	Theatre Republic	August 16, 1916	October 21, 1916
The Guilty Man	Charles Klein and Ruth Helen Davis	Astor Theatre	August 17, 1916	October 1916
Mary's Ankle	May Tully	Bijou Theatre (August); 39th Street Theatre (October)	August 6, 1917	Not known
Business Before Pleasure	Montague Glass and Jules Eckert Goodman	Eltinge 42nd Street Theatre	August 15, 1917	June 1918
Eyes of Youth	Charles Guernon and Max Marcin	Maxine Elliott Theatre (August 1917 – July 1918); 39th Street Theatre (July–August 1918)	August 22, 1917	August 1918
The Scrap of Paper	Owen Davis and Arthur Somers Roche	Criterion Theatre	September 17, 1917	November 1917
On With the Dance	Michael Morton	Theatre Republic	October 29, 1917	December 1917
Parlor, Bedroom and Bath	Charles William Bell and Mark Swan	Theatre Republic	December 24, 1917	July 1918
An American Ace	Lincoln J. Carter	Casino Theatre	April 2, 1918	April 1918
Friendly Enemies	Samuel Shipman and Aaron Hoffman	Hudson Theatre	July 22, 1918	August 1919
Under Orders	Berte Thomas	Eltinge 42nd Street Theatre	August 20, 1918	January 1919
Why Worry?	Montague Glass and Jules Eckert Goodman (book); Blanche Merrill (lyrics), Leo Edwards (music)	Harris Theatre	August 23, 1918	September 14, 1918
Where Poppies Bloom	Roi Cooper Megrue	Theatre Republic	August 26, 1918	November 1918
The Big Chance	Grant Morris and Willard Mack	48th Street Theatre	October 28, 1918	February 1919
Roads of Destiny	Channing Pollock	Theatre Republic	November 27, 1918	February 1919
The Woman in Room 13	Samuel Shipman and Max Marcin	Booth Theatre	January 14, 1919	June 1919
Up in Mabel's Room	Wilson Collison and Otto Hauerbach	Eltinge 42nd Street Theatre	January 15, 1919	August 1919
A Voice in the Dark	Ralph E. Dyar	Theatre Republic	July 28, 1919	November 1919
The Girl in the Limousine	Wilson Collison and Avery Hopwood	Eltinge 42nd Street Theatre	October 6, 1919	January 31, 1920
Too Many Husbands	W. Somerset Maugham	Booth Theatre	October 8, 1919	January 1920
His Honor: Abe Potash	Montague Glass and Jules Eckert Goodman	Bijou Theatre	October 14, 1919	April 1920
The Unknown Woman	Marjorie Blaine and Willard Mack	Maxine Elliott Theatre	November 10, 1919	January 1920
The Sign on the Door	Channing Pollock	Theatre Republic	December 19, 1919	May 1920
No More Blondes	Otto Hauerbach	Maxine Elliott Theatre	January 7, 1920	February 1920
Breakfast in Bed	Georges Feydeau; adapted by Willard Mack and Howard Booth	Eltinge 42nd Street Theatre	February 3, 1920	April 1920
The Blue Flame	George V. Hobart and John Willard	Shubert Theatre	March 15, 1920	April 1920
The Ouija Board	Crane Wilbur	Bijou Theatre	March 29, 1920	May 1920
Crooked Gamblers	Samuel Shipman and Percival Wilde	Hudson Theatre	July 31, 1920	October 1920
Ladies' Night	Avery Hopwood and Charlton Andrews	Eltinge 42nd Street Theatre	August 9, 1920	June 1921
The Lady of the Lamp	Earl Carroll	Theatre Republic	August 17, 1920	November 1920
Happy-Go-Lucky	Ian Hay	Booth Theatre	August 24, 1920	November 1920
The Unwritten Chapter	Samuel Shipman and Victor Victor	Astor Theatre	October 11, 1920	November 1920
The White Villa	Edith Ellis	Eltinge 42nd Street Theatre	February 14, 1921	March 1921
Getting Gertie's Garter	Wilson Collison and Avery Hopwood	Theatre Republic	August 1, 1921	November 1921
Back Pay	Fannie Hurst	Eltinge 42nd Street Theatre	August 30, 1921	November 1921
The Demi-Virgin	Avery Hopwood	Times Square Theatre	October 18, 1921	June 3, 1922
The Man's Name	Marjorie Chase and Eugene Walter	Theatre Republic	November 14, 1921	December 1921
Lawful Larceny	Samuel Shipman	Theatre Republic	January 2, 1922	June 1922
Partners Again	Montague Glass and Jules Eckert Goodman	Selwyn Theatre	May 1, 1922	June 1922
East of Suez	W. Somerset Maugham	Eltinge 42nd Street Theatre	September 21, 1922	December 1922
The Love Child	Henry Bataille; adapted by Martin Brown	George M. Cohan's Theatre	November 14, 1922	April 1923
The Masked Woman	Kate Jordan	Eltinge 42nd Street Theatre	December 22, 1922	April 1923
The Guilty One	Michael Morton and Peter Traill	Selwyn Theatre	March 20, 1923	April 1923
The Good Old Days	Aaron Hoffman	Broadhurst Theatre	August 14, 1923	October 1923
The Woman on the Jury	Bernard K. Burns	Eltinge 42nd Street Theatre	August 15, 1923	October 1923
Red Light Annie	Norman Houston and Sam Forrest	Morosco Theatre	August 21, 1923	November 1923
The Whole Town's Talking	Anita Loos and John Emerson	Bijou Theatre	August 29, 1923	January 1924
Casanova	Lorenzo De Azertis; translated by Sidney Howard	Empire Theatre	September 26, 1923	December 1923
The Lady	Martin Brown	Empire Theatre	December 4, 1923	February 1924
The Shadow	Dario Niccodemi	39th Street Theatre	December 18, 1923	December 1923
The Alarm Clock	Avery Hopwood	39th Street Theatre	December 24, 1923	January 1924
The Road Together	George Middleton	Frazee Theatre	January 17, 1924	January 17, 1924
No Other Girl	Aaron Hoffman (book); Harry Ruby (lyrics)	Morosco Theatre	August 13, 1924	September 27, 1924
High Stakes	Willard Mack	Hudson Theatre	September 9, 1924	December 1924
Conscience	Don Mullally	Belmont Theatre	September 11, 1924	January 1925
The Fake	Frederick Lonsdale	Hudson Theatre	October 6, 1924	December 1924
The Desert Flower	Don Mullally	Longacre Theatre	November 18, 1924	December 1924
The Piker	Leon Gordon	Eltinge 42nd Street Theatre	January 15, 1925	February 1925
A Good Bad Woman (revival)	William J. McNally	Comedy Theatre (February); Playhouse Theatre (June–August)	February 9, 1925	August 1925
Spring Fever	Vincent Lawrence	Maxine Elliott Theatre	August 3, 1925	September 1925
A Kiss in a Taxi	Clifford Grey	Ritz Theatre	August 25, 1925	October 1925
All Dressed Up	Arthur Richman	Eltinge 42nd Street Theatre	September 9, 1925	September 1925
The Green Hat	Michael Arlen	Broadhurst Theatre	September 15, 1925	February 1926
The Pelican	F. Tennyson Jesse and H. M. Harwood	Times Square Theatre	September 21, 1925	November 1925
These Charming People	Michael Arlen	Gaiety Theatre	October 6, 1925	January 1926
Stolen Fruit	Dario Niccodemi; adapted by Gladys Unger	Eltinge 42nd Street Theatre	October 7, 1925	December 1925
The Shanghai Gesture	John Colton	Martin Beck Theatre (February–July); Chanin's 46th Street Theatre (September)	February 1, 1926	September 1926
Fakir Rahman Bey	Rahman Bey	Selwyn Theatre	May 25, 1926	June 1926
The Ghost Train	Arnold Ridley	Eltinge 42nd Street Theatre	August 25, 1926	October 1926
Potash and Perlmutter, Detectives	Montague Glass and Jules Eckert Goodman	Ritz Theatre	August 31, 1926	October 1926
The Woman Disputed	Denison Clift	Forrest Theatre	September 28, 1926	March 1927
Mozart	Sacha Guitry	46th Street Theatre	December 27, 1926	January 1927
Crime	Samuel Shipman and John B. Hymer	Eltinge 42nd Street Theatre	February 22, 1927	August 1927
Her Cardboard Lover	Jacques Deval, adapted by Valerie Wyngate and P. G. Wodehouse	Empire Theatre	March 21, 1927	August 1927
The Trial of Mary Dugan	Bayard Veiller	National Theatre	September 19, 1927	October 1927
The Matrimonial Bed	Seymour Hicks	Ambassador Theatre	October 12, 1927	October 1927
The Mulberry Bush	Edward Knoblauch	Theatre Republic	October 26, 1927	November 1927
The Fanatics	Miles Malleson	49th Street Theatre	November 7, 1927	November 1927
The Shanghai Gesture (revival)	John Colton	Century Theatre	February 13, 1928	February 1928
Fast Life	Samuel Shipman and John B. Hymer	Ambassador Theatre	September 26, 1928	October 1928
Jealousy	Eugene Walter	Maxine Elliott Theatre	October 22, 1928	February 1929
Scarlet Pages	Samuel Shipman and John B. Hymer	Morosco Theatre	September 9, 1929	November 1929
Murder on the Second Floor	Frank Vosper	Eltinge 42nd Street Theatre	September 11, 1929	October 1929
Scotland Yard	Denison Clift	Sam H. Harris Theatre	September 27, 1929	October 1929
Recapture	Preston Sturges	Eltinge 42nd Street Theatre	January 29, 1930	February 1930
Love, Honor and Betray	Fanny Hatton and Frederic Hatton	Eltinge 42nd Street Theatre	March 12, 1930	April 1930
The Ninth Guest	Owen Davis	Eltinge 42nd Street Theatre	August 25, 1930	October 1930
A Farewell to Arms	Laurence Stallings	National Theatre	September 22, 1930	October 1930
Five Star Final	Louis Weitzenkorn	Cort Theater	December 30, 1930	June 1931
Mélo (revival)	Henri Bernstein	Maxine Elliott Theatre	October 19, 1931	October 1931
The Inside Story	George Bryant and Francis M. Verdi	National Theatre	February 22, 1932	March 1932
The Stork is Dead	Hans Kottow	48th Street Theatre	September 23, 1932	October 1932
Move On, Sister	Daniel N. Rubin	Playhouse Theatre	October 24, 1933	October 1933
The Red Cat	Rudolf Lothar and Hans Adler	Broadhurst Theatre	September 19, 1934	September 1934
Night of January 16th	Ayn Rand	Ambassador Theatre	September 16, 1935	April 4, 1936
Abide With Me	Clare Boothe Brokaw	Ritz Theatre	November 21, 1935	December 1935
The Ragged Edge	Mary Heathfield	Fulton Theatre	November 25, 1935	December 1935
Arrest That Woman	Maxine Alton	National Theatre	September 18, 1936	September 1936
Censored	Conrad Seiler and Max Marcin	46th Street Theatre	February 26, 1938	March 1938
Nine Girls	Wilfrid H. Pettitt	Longacre Theatre	January 13, 1943	January 16, 1943
Try and Get It	Sheldon Davis	Cort Theater	August 2, 1943	August 7, 1943
