= The Girl with the Whooping Cough =

Play by Stanislaus Stange

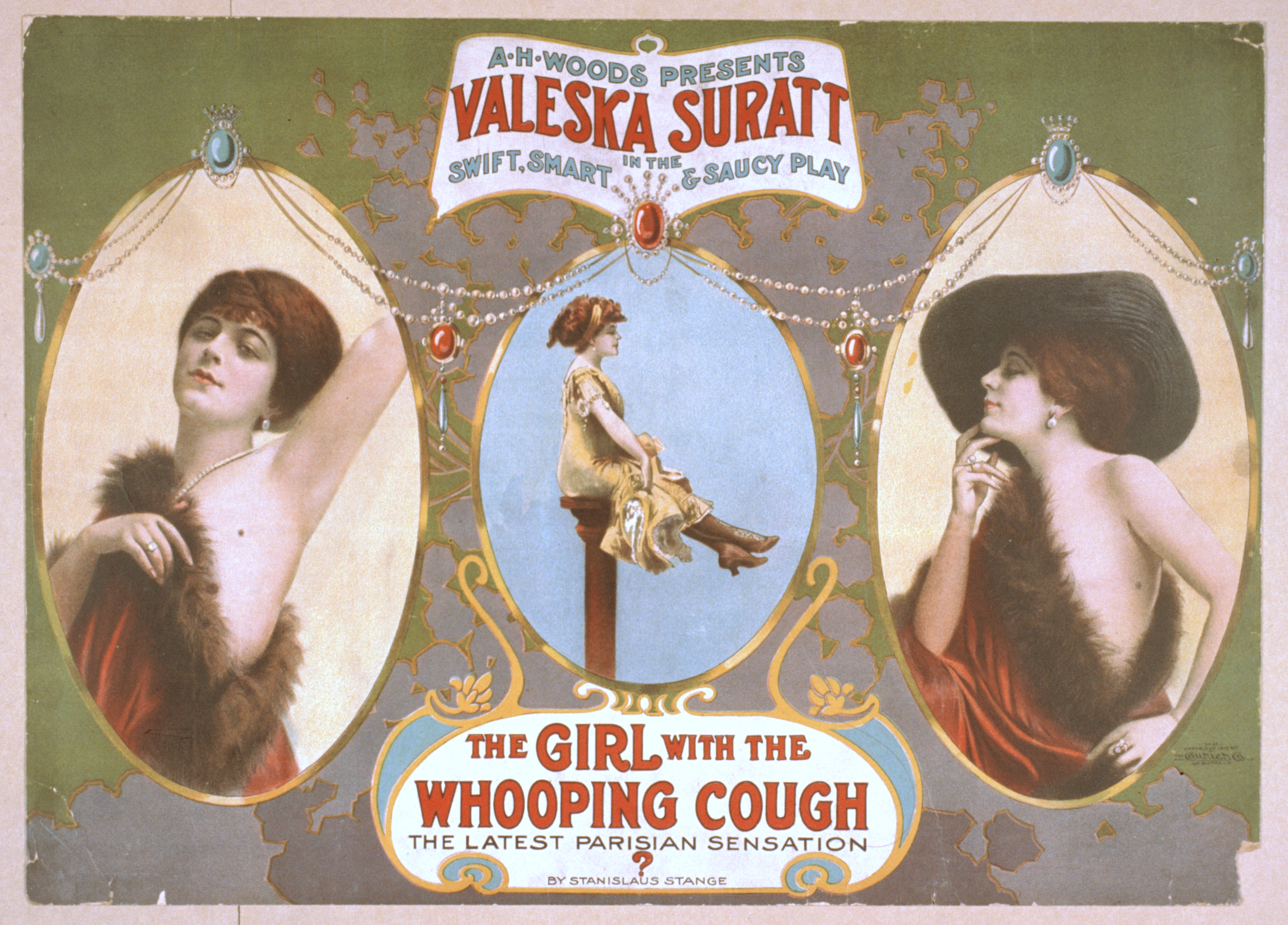
- Poster promoting the play on Broadway
- Original language: English
- Written by: Stanislaus Stange
- Genre: Farce

Premiere
- Date: April 25, 1910
- Place: New York Theatre

The Girl with the Whooping Cough is a play written by Stanislaus Stange in 1910. Adapted from a French farce, the show featured dialogue that was condemned as indecent by many contemporary reviewers. The play's appearance on Broadway was suppressed when New York City officials threatened not to renew the operating license of the theater.

== Plot ==
The story follows the misbehaviors of Regina (Valeska Suratt) as she passes whooping cough to the numerous men she kisses. In the final act, her amours land her in divorce court, where she performs a dance routine borrowed from Suratt's vaudeville act.

== Broadway production and suppression ==
After early performances in Trenton, New Jersey, producer Al Woods brought the play to Broadway, with sultry vaudeville actress Valeska Suratt in the lead role. It opened at the New York Theatre on April 25, 1910. Trenton police had attended a rehearsal and declared the play fit for performance after some mild censorship, but when it came to New York, Mayor William Jay Gaynor viewed it less favorably. Hearing rumors about the play's content, he reviewed a script beforehand and found nothing objectionable in it. When the production went live, he received complaints that made him suspect he had not been given an accurate script. He decided to send stenographers to take notes on its content. They reported back that the actors had "interpolated" salacious elements into the performance.

Based on this evidence, Gaynor asked New York City Police Commissioner William F. Baker to suppress the play. On May 6, 1910, Baker contacted the theater's management company, Klaw & Erlanger. He threatened that if the play was not stopped, he would refuse to renew the theater's operating license, which expired at the end of April. Abraham L. Erlanger promised to cancel the show, but Woods did not agree. After unsatisfactory meetings with Baker and Gaynor, Woods went to the New York Supreme Court on May 9, 1910, to get an injunction preventing the police from closing down the play. The judge gave Woods the order he requested, but while it prevented the authorities from interfering with the show directly, it did not compel them to renew the license for the theater. Left with no home for his production, Woods was forced to shut it down.

Notwithstanding the objections from Woods, Gaynor's actions garnered a positive response from the press. A column in The New York Times said his actions were guided by "common sense and good taste". When the show headed to other cities, Gaynor threatened to write other mayors to warn them against it.

== Reception ==
The play was "unmercifully damned by the critics", according to theater scholar Gerald Bordman. The Trenton True American described the performances there as "disgustingly vulgar". A brief review of the Broadway opening from The New York Times called it "stupid", although the reviewer found some humor in the performance of supporting player Dallas Welford. Drama critic George Jean Nathan called it "nauseating and ... disgusting in its futile efforts to be risqué".

When the play went on the road after being shut down in New York, the Philadelphia Times declared it "coarse", "vulgar" and not worthy of any "self-respecting person".
