= Al Woods =

Al Woods may refer to:

- Sir Albert Woods (1816–1904), English officer of arms
- Albert H. Woods (1870–1951), American theatrical producer
- Alvis Woods (born 1953), American baseball player
- Al Woods (American football) (born 1987), American football player

== See also ==
- Alan Woods (disambiguation)
- Alex Woods (disambiguation)
- Al Wood (born 1958), American basketball player
