= The Demi-Virgin =

1921 stage play by Avery Hopwood

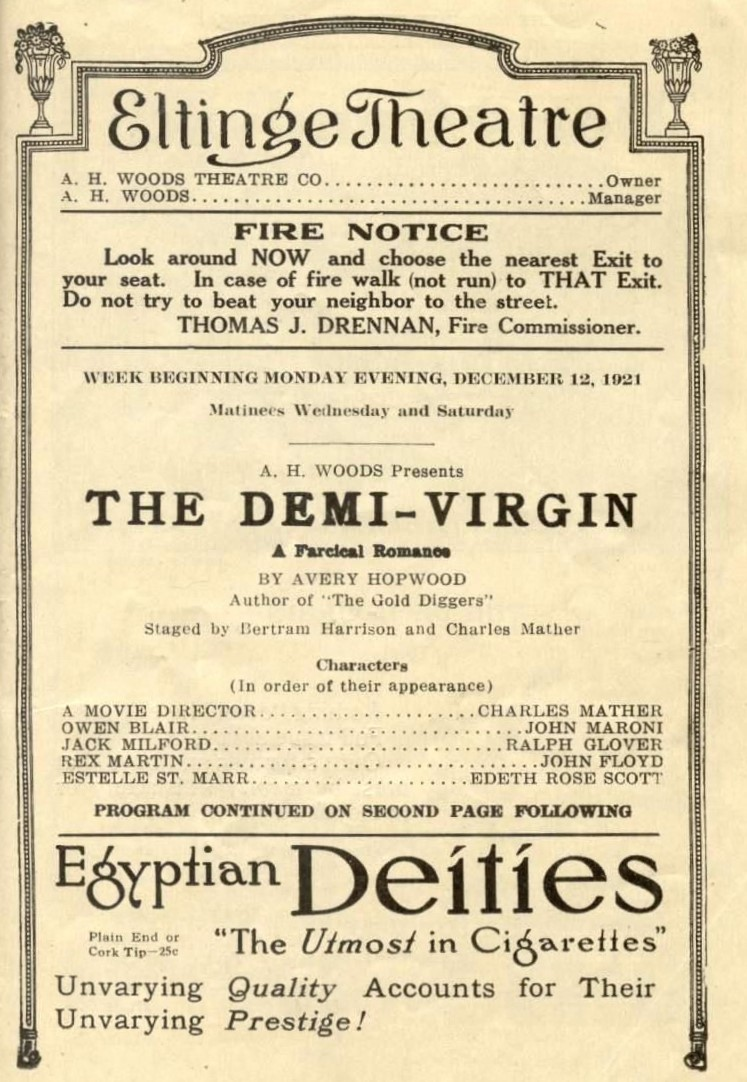
- Broadway program
- Original language: English
- Written by: Avery Hopwood
- Genre: Farce
- Setting: Hollywood

Premiere
- Date: October 18, 1921
- Place: Times Square Theatre

The Demi-Virgin is a three-act play written by Avery Hopwood. Producer Albert H. Woods staged it on Broadway, where it was a hit during the 1921–22 season. The play is a bedroom farce about former couple Gloria Graham and Wally Dean, both movie actors, whose brief marriage causes the press to speculate about whether Gloria is still a virgin. She attempts to seduce Wally when they are forced to reunite for a movie, but after playing along he surprises her by revealing that their divorce is not valid.

Because it contained suggestive dialogue and the female cast wore revealing clothes, the production was considered highly risqué at the time. The script alluded to a contemporary scandal involving actor Fatty Arbuckle, and one scene featured actresses stripping as part of a card game. Reviewers generally panned the play as unfunny and vulgar, and local authorities attempted to censor it. A New York City magistrate ruled the Broadway production was obscene, and obscenity charges were brought against Woods, but a grand jury declined to indict him. The city's Commissioner of Licenses attempted to revoke the theater's license, but this effort was blocked in court. Woods promoted the controversy to increase ticket sales, and the play was one of the most successful of the season. It had no long-term literary impact and was never published, but it did stimulate arguments over censorship of theatrical performances.

== Plot ==
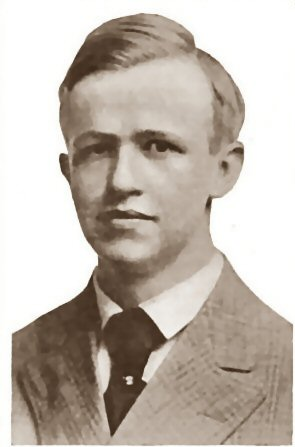
Avery Hopwood wrote the play in 1921.

The story centers on the character Gloria Graham, a silent film actress who had previously been married to fellow actor Wally Dean. After he received a late-night call on their wedding night from a former girlfriend, Gloria stormed out and went to Reno, Nevada, to obtain a divorce. The brevity of the union leads gossip columnists to speculate about whether the marriage was consummated. They label Gloria the "demi-virgin". The first act opens with a group of actresses, including Cora Montague and Betty Wilson, filming a scene for a movie and gossiping about the failed marriage. Betty's aunt Zeffie comes to the studio with a magazine article about how the couple has been forced to reunite to complete the movie, for which they were contracted before their break-up. When they arrive for filming, Gloria claims Sir Gerald Sydney has proposed to her. In an act of jealousy, Wally lies and says he is engaged to Betty. Betty is actually interested in another actor, Chicky Belden, although her aunt disapproves of him. The first act culminates with Gloria and Wally being required to film a love scene together.

The second act takes place a week later, when the movie's cast are attending a decadent party at Gloria's house. Wally and Chicky have conspired to use the phony engagement of Betty and Wally to win Zeffie's approval of the real relationship between Betty and Chicky. They think she will find Wally so unacceptable that Chicky will seem good in comparison. Meanwhile, Gloria also wants to prove Wally is an unfit match for Betty, by seducing him to prove that he is unfaithful. She lures Wally to her bedroom suite on the pretense of renewing their relationship, without intending to follow through. She plans to tease him until Zeffie finds them there, but he is prepared for her plan and will not accept any delay; the act ends with him telling her that she must fulfill her "marriage debt" to him.

The third act continues in Gloria's bedroom suite. In the play's most controversial scene, a group of actresses enter the room while Wally hides in another room of the suite. They decide to play "Stripping Cupid", a card-based strip game, and remove pieces of clothing onstage. One of them, Dot Madison, is down to her last two items of clothing when Wally returns to the room. The actresses leave, and Wally says he is going to get his bag so he has it the next morning. While he is out of the room, Zeffie enters. Gloria asks Zeffie to hide in the bed, so when Wally returns she will see his advances firsthand. In a final plot twist, when Wally returns he has a telegram from his lawyer revealing that the Reno divorce is not valid. Gloria and Wally reconcile, and Zeffie gives her approval to the relationship between Betty and Chicky.

== Cast and characters ==
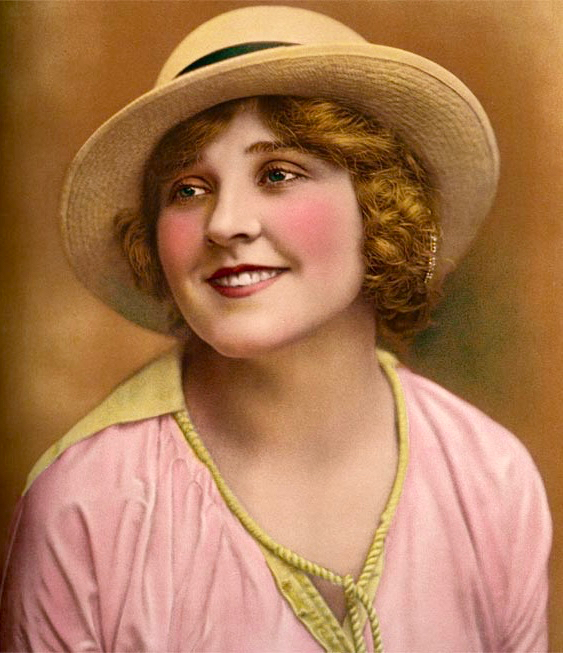
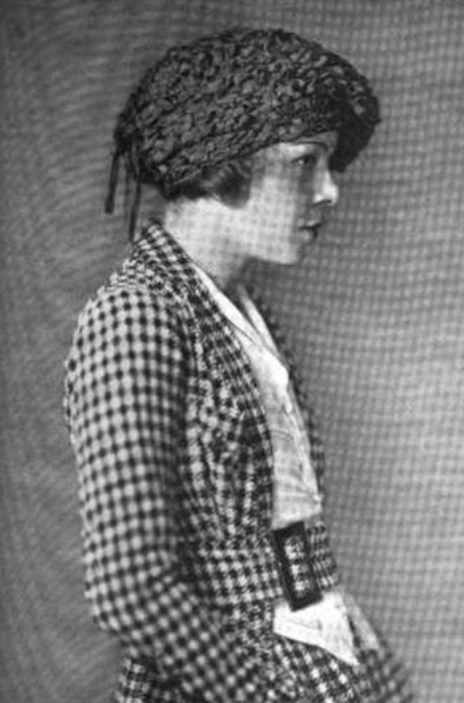
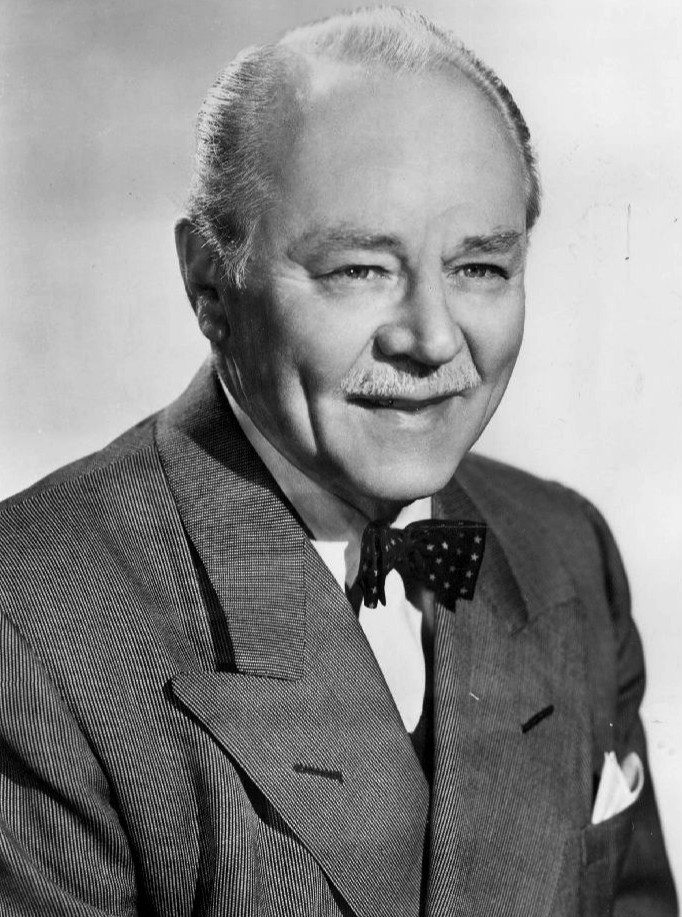
Broadway cast members Hazel Dawn, Constance Farber, and Charles Ruggles

For the role of Gloria Graham, producer Albert H. Woods cast Hazel Dawn, who was then starring in his production of Getting Gertie's Garter. She had previously starred in another Woods-produced bedroom farce, Up in Mabel's Room. Dawn left the cast in March 1922 and was replaced by Belle Bennett.

The characters and cast from the Broadway production are listed below:

Broadway opening night cast
Character	Cast
Wally Dean	Glenn Anders
Bee La Rose	Sascha Beaumont
Estelle St. Marr	Marjorie Clements
Amy Allenby	Peggy Coudray
Betty Wilson	Helen Cunningham
Gloria Graham	Hazel Dawn
Sir Gerald Sydney	Kenneth Douglas
Cora Montague	Constance Farber
Fay Winthrop	Helen Flint
Jack Milford	Ralph Glover
Rex Martin	John Floyd
Aunt Zeffie	Alice Hegeman
Owen Blair	John Maroni
A Director	Charles Mather
Dot Madison	Mary Robinson
Chicky Belden	Charles Ruggles
Gladys Lorraine	Mary Salisbury
Wanda Boresca	Mildred Wayne

== History ==
=== Background and writing ===
Prior to writing The Demi-Virgin, Hopwood was a well-established author of bedroom comedies. His past efforts in the genre included Fair and Warmer, produced by Edgar Selwyn in 1915, and The Gold Diggers, produced by David Belasco in 1919. Producer Albert H. Woods had an even longer track record in the genre, starting with The Girl from Rector's in 1909. Such material had been very profitable for Woods, who commissioned originals and adapted foreign farces, and for Hopwood, who was one of the most successful authors in the genre. Their first work together was The Girl in the Limousine in 1919, which Hopwood revised from an earlier script by Wilson Collison. Hopwood then helped revise Ladies' Night in 1920 and Getting Gertie's Garter in 1921. The Demi-Virgin was Hopwood's first play written for Woods without a collaborator. Hopwood was inspired by an earlier theatrical adaptation of Les Demi-vierges, an 1894 novel by the French writer Marcel Prévost that had been dramatized in 1895, but used little from it beyond the title.

Hopwood's completion of The Demi-Virgin coincided with a scandal involving Hollywood actor Fatty Arbuckle, who was accused of manslaughter after he allegedly raped a young actress, Virginia Rappe, who later died. (He was eventually acquitted.) Although the play was largely written before the scandal broke, Hopwood incorporated references to Arbuckle in the first produced version of the script through a character called "Fatty Belden". These references were toned down after preview audiences reacted poorly, and the character was renamed "Chicky Belden".

=== Broadway production and legal problems ===
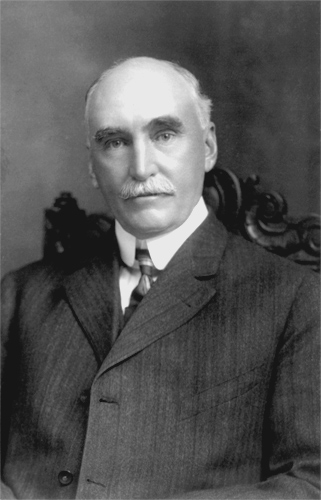
Magistrate William McAdoo ruled the play was obscene.

Prior to its Broadway debut, preview performances of the play were staged in several cities. The first was in Pittsburgh, where it began a scheduled one-week run on September 26, 1921. It was closed early on the last day by the local Director of Public Safety, who objected to some of the dialogue. Hopwood was upset by the censorship, but Woods was happy to have free publicity from press coverage of the closure. The tryouts then moved to Stamford, Connecticut and Atlantic City, New Jersey, where they proceeded without incident. The play's Broadway opening was at the Times Square Theatre on October 18, 1921. It ran there for a few weeks until Woods transferred it to his own Eltinge 42nd Street Theatre on November 7.

On November 3, 1921, Woods and Hopwood were called to the chambers of William McAdoo, the Chief Magistrate of the New York City magistrates' court, to respond to complaints about the play. Woods would not make any changes to address the complaints, so a formal hearing began on November 7. Woods was represented by famed attorney Max Steuer, who was also a co-owner of the Eltinge Theatre. The witnesses against the show included John S. Sumner, executive secretary of the New York Society for the Suppression of Vice, and Edward J. McGuire, vice-chairman of the Committee of Fourteen. On November 14, McAdoo ruled that the play was obscene, describing it as "coarsely indecent, flagrantly and suggestively immoral, impure in word and action". Woods was placed on bail, and the case was referred to the Court of Special Sessions for a misdemeanor charge of staging an obscene exhibition. Woods successfully requested that the case be transferred to the Court of General Sessions, which provided jury trials and required an indictment by a grand jury. He was accused of violating section 1140a of the New York state penal law, which prohibited involvement in "any obscene, indecent, immoral or impure drama, play, exhibition, show or entertainment". The grand jury heard the case on December 23, 1921, but dismissed it that same day, even though they had heard only witnesses favoring the prosecution.

As the obscenity case proceeded, the city's Commissioner of Licenses, John Gilchrist, informed Woods on November 22 that he found the play "indecent and subversive of public morals" and would revoke the theater's operating license if the production continued. Gilchrist's effort failed when a New York state appeals court ruled on February 20, 1922, that he did not have the legal authority to revoke a theater license once it had been granted.

After the Broadway production ended on June 3, 1922, Woods launched four road companies to present the play in other cities. The tour continued through 1923, with productions in cities such as Albany, Chicago, Los Angeles, Philadelphia, and Washington.

== Reception ==
=== Reviews ===
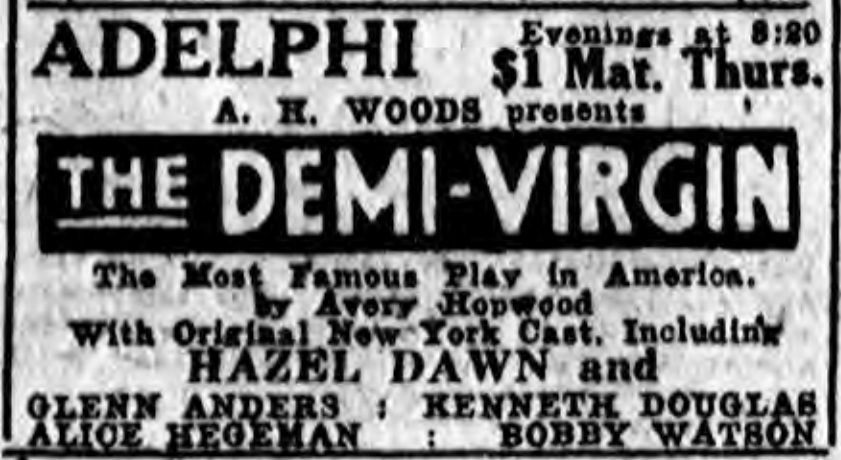
Ads for a touring production traded on the play's notoriety.

Contemporary reviews were generally negative. Many reviewers condemned the play as immoral due to its sexual situations and suggestive dialogue. The costumes of its female cast members, who mostly wore revealing gowns or scanty bedroom attire, also attracted attention. A few reviewers complimented the cast for being attractive and fashionable. Others considered their clothing inappropriately risqué, especially in the "Stripping Cupid" scene. A reviewer for the Pittsburgh Post described the preview production as "reeking with indecencies".

The reviewer for the New York Evening Post gave the Broadway production only three sentences, claiming that there was no need for "wasting space" on the repulsive "concoction" created by Hopwood and Woods. Drama critic George Jean Nathan called the play "trash". Dorothy Parker quipped that Dawn had "gone from bed to worse" by being in the production. The reviewer for Brooklyn Life said it shocked the audience from beginning to end with more frequency than a burlesque show. In The Evening World, Charles Darnton also compared the show to "cheap burlesque", saying it was filled with "old jokes" but few laughs.

Some critics said that the play's reputation for immorality was overstated, contending it was harmless or even boring. A reviewer writing for The Sun, for example, said it was "not as shocking as Manager Woods would like theatre goers to believe", while a review in The New York Clipper said that the plot was more pure than the realities of Hollywood and relied on "sweet little risque 'bits' and a super-abundance of suggestive lines" to keep audience interest. In The Washington Post, Percy Hammond described it as entertaining, saying Hopwood had "never been wittier". Burns Mantle said Hopwood and Woods had substituted uninteresting stripping and lewd dialogue for better plotting and humor.

=== Box office ===
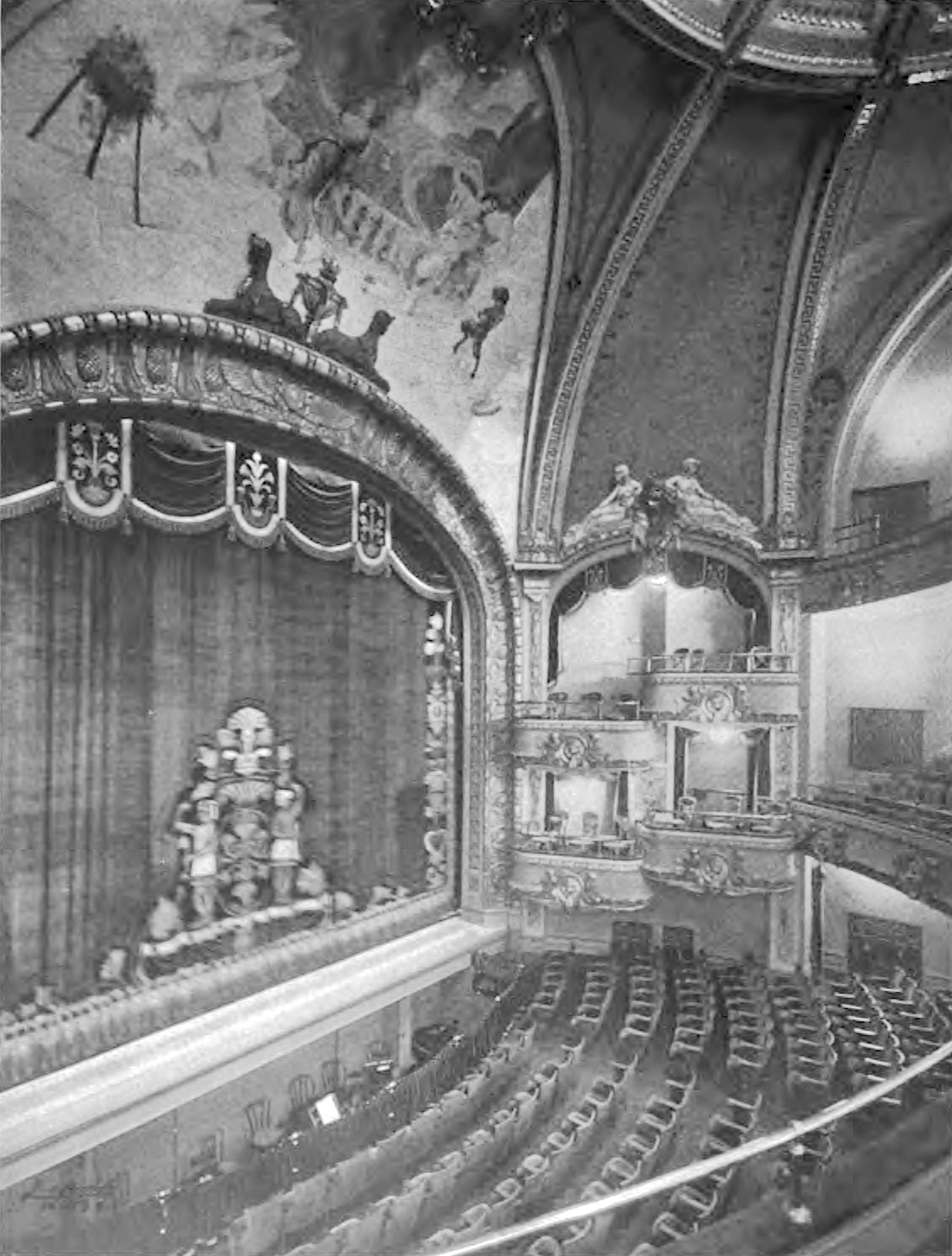
The play ran for just under seven months at the Eltinge Theatre.

Critics' concerns did not stop the play from being a box office success. Several reviewers anticipated that focusing on the play's salacious content would increase patronage. Woods exploited the controversy over the play's content in his advertisements for it. When he was taken to court, The New York Times decided Woods could no longer use the name of the play in any ads placed with the paper. Woods worked around the problem by promoting the large number of people who had seen an unnamed production at his theater, with daily updates of the total. In ads where he could mention the name, he traded on its reputation with suggestive taglines, such as one inviting audiences to "complete your education" by seeing the play. Some ads suggested the reader should see the play to stay informed, because there was widespread discussion of it. In other ads, it was declared "the most famous play in America".

News coverage of legal actions also provided considerable free publicity. Variety reported that lines for the Broadway production stretched around the corner after it was condemned in the magistrates' court. Before the court proceedings, the play was earning about $12,000 per week. After proceedings began, the box office increased to $14,000–15,000 per week, which Variety described as near the theater's capacity. Woods added matinees and increased the top ticket prices; the weekly box office reached over $17,000 at the end of November. By the time the production closed, it was one of the most successful of that season, having sold over 200,000 tickets across 268 performances.

== Legacy ==
The Demi-Virgin, like most of Hopwood's farces, was commercially successful, but had no lasting literary significance. Even as a popular entertainment, the play's appeal was limited by cultural context. Before World War I, in a time with more conservative sexual mores, the production would have been more likely to be suppressed. A decade later, the sexual attitudes conveyed in the play would be considered too unsophisticated for Broadway. As early as the end of 1921, Woods was suggesting a seven-year hiatus in the production of bedroom farces, saying the genre had become stale. In 1925, Hopwood confessed to the audience at another play that he thought The Demi-Virgin was boring and that he was tired of writing faddish entertainment. The play's script was never published and no movie adaptation was made. A copy of the script is held by the Library of Congress.

The legal battle over whether The Demi-Virgin was obscene gave new impetus to ongoing controversies about censorship. Conservatives called for new anti-obscenity legislation, while their opponents warned of the dangers of state censorship. Sumner had previously promoted a plan to create citizen-led "play juries" that would review and censor productions. When city officials were unable to shut down The Demi-Virgin, the play jury idea was revived as a compromise between city officials, who wanted a way to rein in what they saw as uncontrolled smut, and producers, who feared that new censorship laws might be enacted. Among producers, the legal victories achieved by Woods also suggested new opportunities. In 1923, Broadway producer Earl Carroll began his Vanities revue, featuring dozens of women in costumes considered daring at the time. Later that same year, J. J. Shubert opened a revue called Artists and Models, which included an act with topless female models. The explicitness of the revues drew censors' focus away from the innuendo of bedroom farces. Woods later said that in comparison to these revues, he had "never produced an off-color show". The play juries proved unwilling to take the strong anti-obscenity action that Sumner and his colleagues wanted; by 1927 the system had been abandoned in favor of renewed efforts at government regulation.
