= Nellie, the Beautiful Cloak Model (film) =

1924 film by Emmett J. Flynn

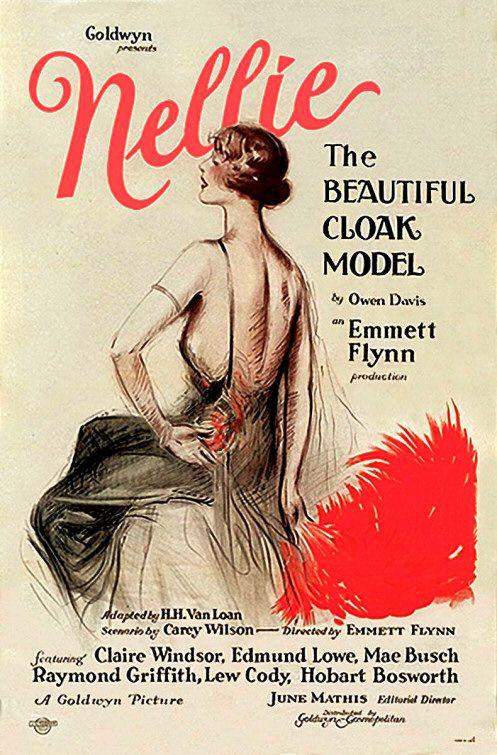
- Directed by: Emmett J. Flynn
- Written by: Carey Wilson; H.H. Van Loan
- Based on: play by Owen Davis
- Produced by: Samuel Goldwyn
- Starring: Claire Windsor
- Cinematography: Lucien Andriot; Paul Ivano (2nd unit)
- Distributed by: Goldwyn Pictures
- Release date: April 16, 1924
- Running time: 70 minutes
- Country: United States
- Language: Silent (English intertitles)

Nellie, the Beautiful Cloak Model is a 1924 American silent drama film directed by Emmett J. Flynn and starring Claire Windsor. Produced and distributed by Goldwyn Pictures, the film is based on a play by Owen Davis, which premiered on Broadway in 1906.

== Plot ==
As described in a film magazine review, ill used by her father, Nellie is taken in charge by Thomas Lipton and brought up in poor surroundings. When Thomas dies, she becomes a cloak model. She is continuously persecuted by her mother's nephew Walter Peck, the owner of the shop on Fifth Avenue where she works. He endeavors to get rid of her so that he can obtain a fortune to which she is the heiress. After many adventures, including her rescue from crushed by an elevated train by Jack Carroll, the man she loves, the young woman finds happiness.

== Cast ==
- Claire Windsor as Nellie
- Edmund Lowe as Jack Carroll
- Mae Busch as Polly Joy
- Raymond Griffith as Shorty Burchell
- Lew Cody as Walter Peck
- Hobart Bosworth as Thomas Lipton/Robert Horton
- Lilyan Tashman as Nita
- Dorothy Cumming as Mrs. Horton
- Will Walling as Blizzard Dugan
- Mayme Kelso as Miss Drake
- William Orlamond as Mosely
- Arthur Housman as Gangster
- David Kirby as Gangster
- Ina Anson as Model
- Betsy Ann Hisle as Nellie age five

== Preservation status ==
A copy is held in Russia by the Gosfilmofond Russian State Archive.
