= Alexander Wood =

Alexander Wood may refer to:

- Alexander Wood (physician) (1817–1884), physician and inventor of the hypodermic needle
- Alexander Wood (merchant) (1772–1844), city magistrate forced to leave Upper Canada in 1810 following allegations of scandal
- Alexander Wood (soccer) (1907–1987), member of the American Soccer Hall of Fame
- Alexander Wood (physicist) (1879–1950), university lecturer in the field of acoustics and experimental physics
- Alexander T. Wood, 19th-century architect of the United States Custom House (New Orleans)
- Alexander Wood (footballer) (1906–?), Scottish footballer
- Alexander Wood (surgeon) (1725–1807), Edinburgh surgeon
- Alexander Wood, Lord Wood (1788–1864), Scottish judge
- Alexander Wood (rugby union) (1848–1905), Scottish rugby union player

== See also ==
- Alex Wood (disambiguation)
- Alexander Woods or Big Scarr (2000–2022), American rapper
- Alex Woods (disambiguation)
