= Alex Wood =

Alex Wood may refer to:

- Alex Wood (baseball) (born 1991), American baseball pitcher
- Alex Wood (politician) (born 1950), former Labour leader of Edinburgh City Council in Scotland
- Alex Wood (ice hockey) (1909–1979), ice hockey goaltender
- Alex Wood (American football) (born 1955), American football coach
- Alex Wood (bishop) (1871–1937), Anglican bishop in India

== See also ==
- Alexander Wood (disambiguation)
- Alex Woods (disambiguation)
