= The Girl from Rector's =

Play by Paul M. Potter

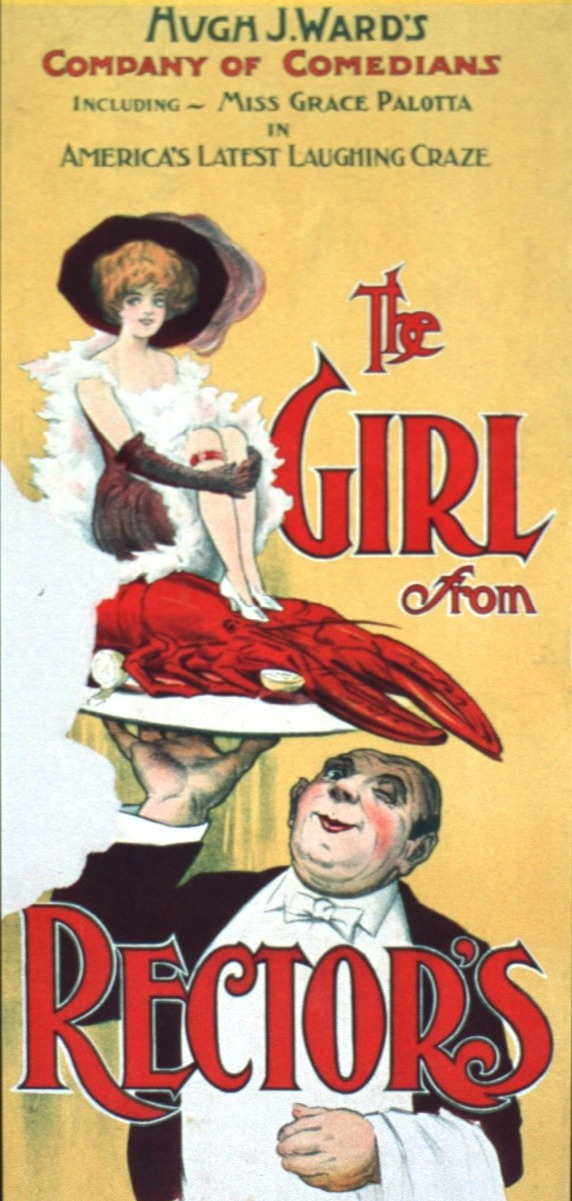
- Poster for an Australian production
- Original language: French
- Written by: Paul M. Potter
- Genre: Farce

Premiere
- Date: February 1, 1909
- Place: Weber's Music Hall

The Girl from Rector's is a play written by Paul M. Potter. The play is a sex farce involving several couples in a tangle of adulterous affairs, and was considered indecent by many critics, as well as some government officials who censored performances. It is an adaptation of Loute, a French farce by Pierre Veber. In 1909, producer A. H. Woods staged it on Broadway, where it was a hit.

== Plot ==
New York rake Richard O'Shaugnessy is having an illicit affair with a woman he knows by the name "Loute Sedaine". When O'Shaugnessy's cousin asks for help with charming Marcia Singleton, a high-class young woman visiting from Battle Creek, Michigan, O'Shaugnessy decides she will be a more favorable partner for himself instead of for his cousin. He informs his mentor, known to him as "Colonel Tandy", that he will marry Singleton and break off his relations with Sedaine. He also severs ties with Tandy, whose assistance he no longer needs.

When he arrives in Battle Creek, O'Shaugnessy discovers his rude dealings with Sedaine and Tandy were a mistake, because "Tandy" turns out to be a false name used in New York by his new fiancée's father. Similarly, "Sedaine" is also from Battle Creek, where she is married to a local judge. In a complication borrowed from the French original without regard to its implausibility in American law, O'Shaugnessy and Singleton have already wed in a civil ceremony, but need to go through a religious ceremony to complete their marriage. The joint arrival of O'Shaugnessy's lover and his mentor threatens to disrupt this plan. The main characters all end up at a roadhouse, where they go in and out of one another's rooms, revealing their embarrassing affairs. Eventually they work out their differences; O'Shaugnessy consummates his new marriage, and his former lover reconciles with her husband.

== History ==
Woods purchased the production rights after reading the original. He had previously produced touring melodramas that were as likely to appear in the Bowery as on Broadway. The Girl from Rector's was his first regular Broadway production.

Prior to opening on Broadway, preview performances were scheduled in Trenton, New Jersey. After the first matinee, a group of 25 local clergy complained to Trenton police the play was immoral. The police shut the play down and did not permit any further performances.

== Productions ==
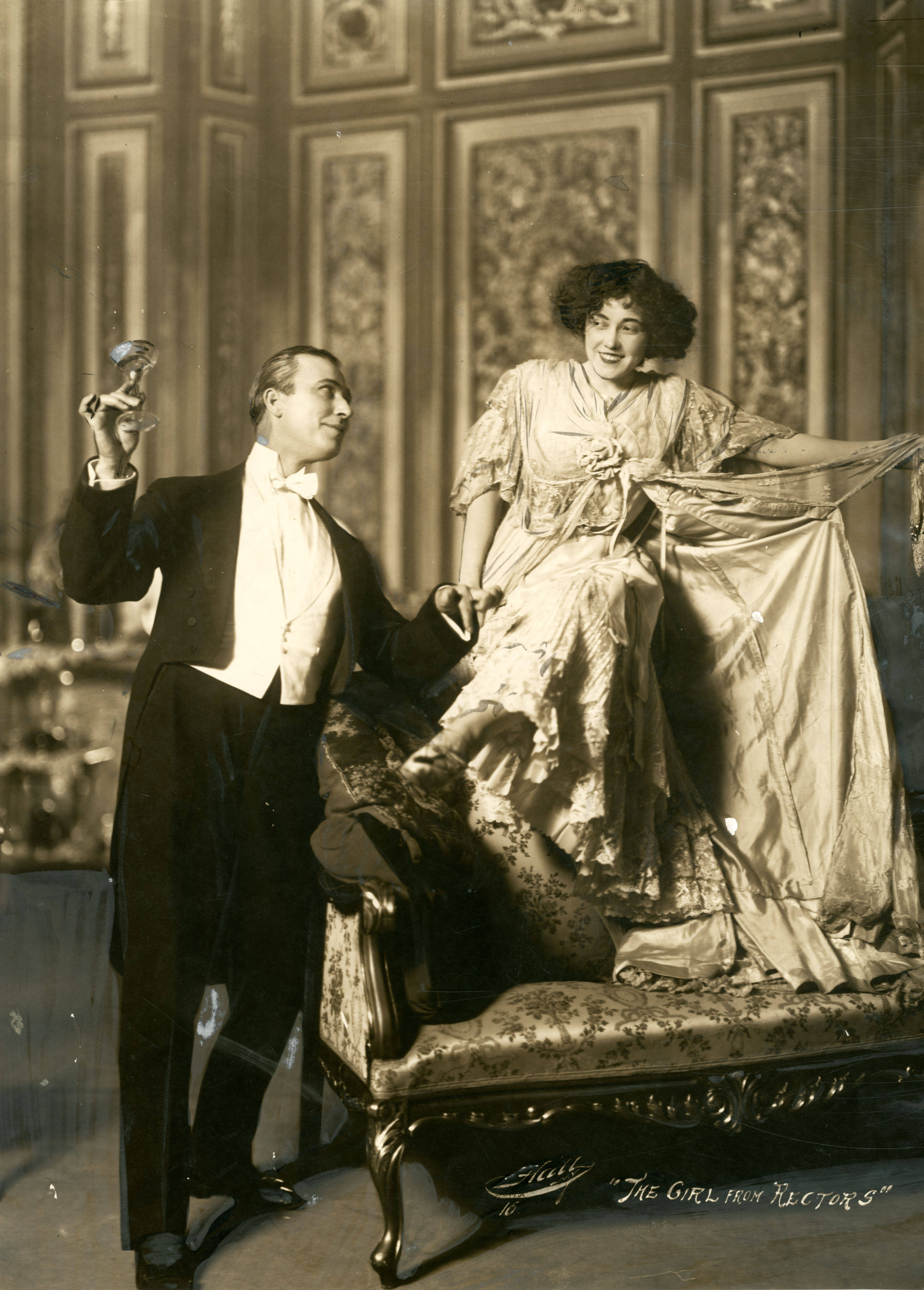
A scene from a production at the Moore Theater in Seattle

The Broadway production opened at Weber's Music Hall on February 1, 1909. It ran there until June 1909, with 184 performances.

The characters and cast from the Broadway production are given below:

Character	Broadway cast
Loute Sedaine	Violet Dale
Richard O'Shaugnessy	Van Rensselaer Wheeler
Duddle	J. W. Ashley
Col. Andrew Tandy	William Burress
Prof. Audrey Maboon	Dallas Welford
Mrs. Witherspoon Copley	Elita Proctor Otis
Marcia Singleton	Nena Blake
Angelica	Nella Webb
Judge Caperton	Herbert Carr
Knickebain	Max Freeman
Deacon Wiggleford	John Daly Murphy
Mrs. Tarbox	Mildred McNeill
Mrs. Wiggleford	Isabel O'Madigan
Vera Flower	Florence M. Constantine
Pansie Patterson	Helena H. Constantine
Nannie Hall	Evelyn F. Constantine

== Reception ==
The play's content was controversial among contemporary critics, many of whom condemned the play as indecent. Muckracking journalist Samuel Hopkins Adams counted it as one of many plays of "dubious character" that had invaded American theater. He decried its suggestive dialogue, as well as its portrayal of loose women and lecherous men, and described the final act as "the grossest bit of action that I have ever seen on an English-speaking stage". When the play previewed in Trenton, the Trenton Evening Times denounced it as "offensively vulgar and putrid". The New York Times review of the Broadway production said Potter "appears to have gone as far as he thought the police would allow". In The Evening World, reviewer Charles Darnton said the play "tries very hard to be bad, but it only succeeds in being stupid".

== Impact on namesake ==
The play's title refers to a popular Manhattan restaurant of its day operated by George Rector, although the restaurant does not appear in the play and is only mentioned once. The play's notoriety proved problematic for Rector, who was in the process of building the Hotel Rector to go with his restaurant. Many believed the unsavory reputation of the play tarnished the new hotel, and held the play responsible when Rector declared his new venture bankrupt in May 1913. The new owners changed the name to escape the stigma.
