= Alan Woods =

Alan Woods may refer to:

- Alan Woods (footballer) (1937–2021), English football player
- Alan Woods (gambler) (1945–2008), Australian professional gambler who bet on blackjack and horse races
- Alan Woods (political theorist) (born 1944), British Trotskyist political theorist
- Alan Woods (priest) (1942–2026), English Anglican dean
- Alan Woods (public servant) (1930–1990), senior Australian public servant
- Alan Woods (soccer) (born 1978), American soccer (football) defender
- Alan Woods (The Bill), a character in the British police television series The Bill

== See also ==
- Al Woods (disambiguation)
- Alan Wood (disambiguation)
- Allan Woods (1906–1968), Australian rugby league player
- Allan Wood (born 1943), Australian swimmer
