= Nellie, the Beautiful Cloak Model =

Play by Owen Davis

- Written by: Owen Davis
- Original language: English
- Genre: Melodrama

Premiere
- Date premiered: December 31, 1906
- Place premiered: West End Theatre

Nellie, the Beautiful Cloak Model is a play written by Owen Davis. A Broadway production of it by A. H. Woods opened in 1906 and was a huge hit. The story is a melodrama, and it was often cited as an archetype of the genre. Reata Winfield originated the title role in the Broadway production.

== Plot ==
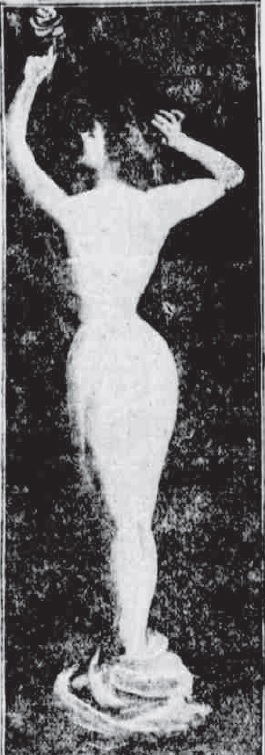
Reata Winfield performing in the Broadway production.

Nellie Grey is a young woman who works in the cloak department of a department store. She lives in a boarding house with her abusive great uncle and his handicapped son, Tom. Long separated from her mother, she is unaware that she has a fortune coming to her. Her nefarious cousin, Walter Hilton, hopes to secure the money for himself. He first intends to marry Nellie, but her co-worker Hortense Drake has her own eyes on Walter, so Hortense convinces him that it is better to dispose of Nellie completely. Nellie is then subjected to four acts of plots against her by Walter and Hortense. They tie her to train tracks, but she is rescued by Jack Carroll, a handsome young man who lives in the boarding house. They try to crush her with an elevator, but Tom saves her. Walter ties her to the mast of a yacht, but a co-worker from the store frees her. She is blown off a bridge with a bomb, but Jack pulls her from the water. Only in the fourth act is Walter finally thwarted, and Nellie is reunited with her mother.

== Productions ==
The Broadway production opened on New Year's Eve in 1906 at the West End Theatre. A. H. Woods produced and Reata Winfield played the role of Nellie. After a long run on Broadway, the play moved to road companies, where it continued to pull large audiences. A production on Manhattan's Lower East Side ran for five years.

== Dramatic analysis ==
Nellie, the Beautiful Cloak Model was a classic melodrama, one of the most popular of its day. It contains a number of elements that were typical of the genre, and especially of the melodramas written by Davis, a prolific author who turned out several such scripts per year. (Nellie was his seventh production that season.) Among these common elements were the poor heroine who is secretly the child of a wealthy family, the scheming relative trying to steal her inheritance, and the dramatic physical perils she faces (tied to train tracks, explosions, etc.). Davis estimated that Nellie faced death 17 times during the course of each production. Even the title was typical, reflecting the main character's affinity to the expected working class audience.

== Reception ==
The Broadway production was a hit, pulling in $4000 per week at the box office. At the time, the New York Dramatic Mirror complimented Winfield's performance on Broadway as "a natural and spirited rendering". The Scranton Republican described the action as "nerve-wracking" and said it taught the importance of honesty "in an intelligent, plausible way".

Literary critics tended to dismiss the play, calling it "formulaic", "far-fetched", "cheap melodrama", and "one of the most perfectly bad plays of its era". A review in The Sun said Davis had just written the play "several nights ago", suggested a press agent did the casting, and mocked an adult actress for playing Nellie's young male cousin. Franklin Fyles called it a "bum play" with plot points that were "worn out", but nonetheless predicted it "would draw in women like a bargain sale". A review of a road production in the Los Angeles Herald said it was "impossible to take seriously" and "utterly lacking in cohesiveness, continuity or ethics".

== Adaptations ==
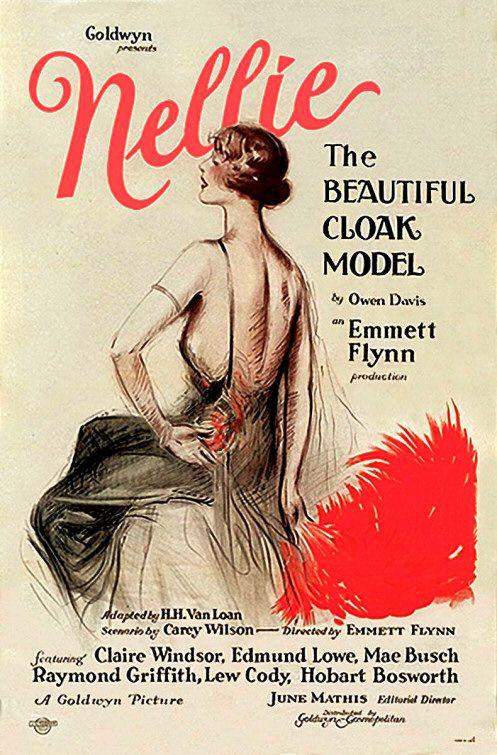
Poster for the film adaptation

In 1924, Emmett J. Flynn directed a silent movie adaptation of the play for Goldwyn Pictures. Claire Windsor starred as Nellie. Following the movie, a novelization of the story by Grace Miller White was published by J. S. Ogilvie.
