= Recapture =

Play written by Preston Sturges

- Written by: Preston Sturges
- Original language: English
- Genre: drama
- Setting: The Bellevue-Superbe-Palace Hotel in Vichy, France and the Villa Lune de Miel

Premiere
- Date premiered: January 29, 1930
- Place premiered: Eltinge 42nd Street Theatre (B'way); New York City

Recapture is a 1930 drama in three acts by Preston Sturges, his third play to appear on Broadway.

The Broadway production was directed by Don Mullally and produced by A. H. Woods. It opened on January 29, 1930, at the Eltinge 42nd Street Theatre, and ran for 24 performances, closing in February of that year. According to Sturges, the play received "the most violently destructive notices [he] had seen in years."

Appearing in the cast were Melvyn Douglas and Glenda Farrell.
