= Alex Woods =

Alex Woods may refer to:

- Alexx Woods, character on television show CSI: Miami

== See also ==
- Al Woods (disambiguation)
- Alex Wood (disambiguation)
