= Owen Davis =

American dramatist (1874–1956)

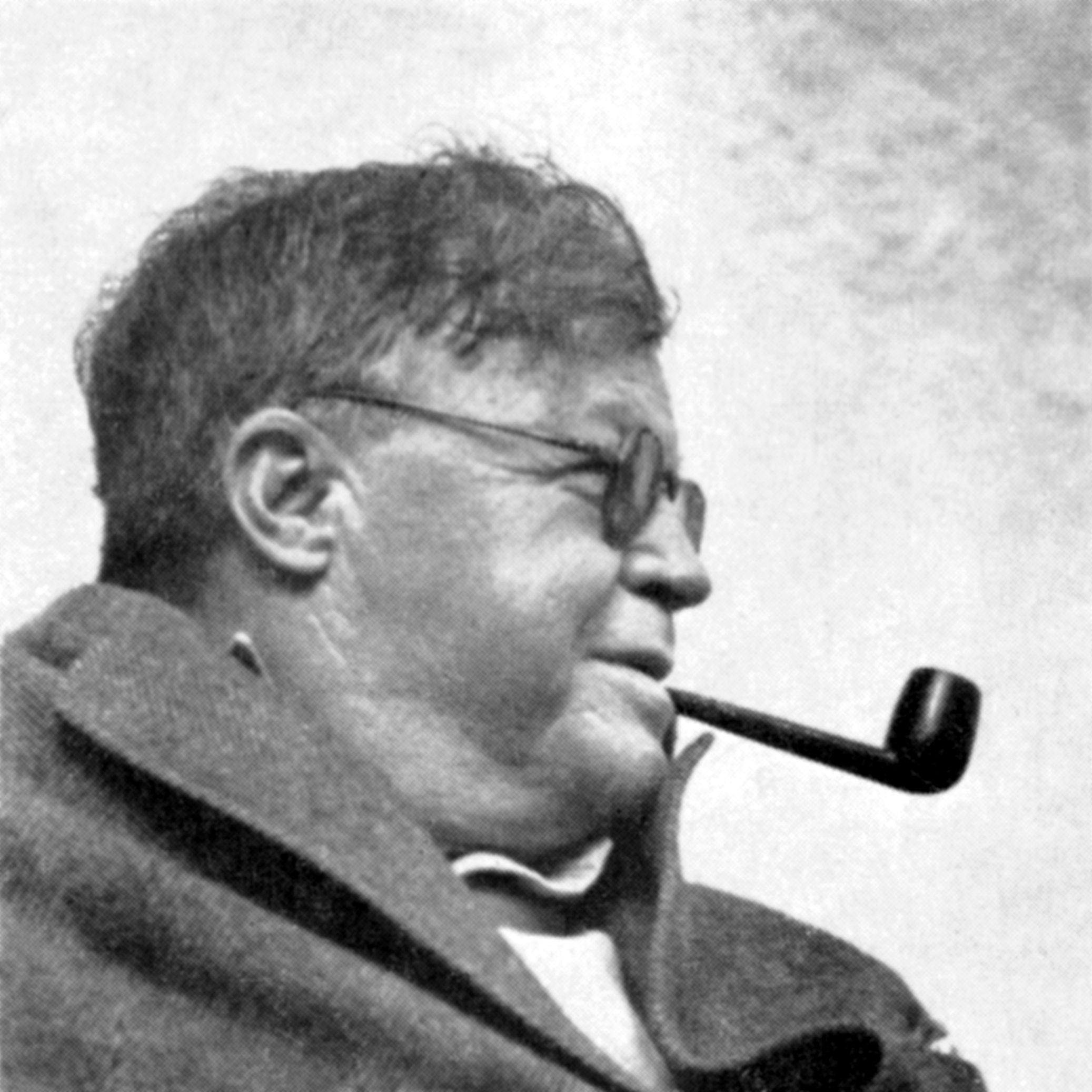
- Owen Davis in 1950
- Born: Owen Gould Davis; January 29, 1874; Portland, Maine, U.S.
- Died: October 14, 1956 (aged 82); New York City, New York, U.S.
- Education: University of Tennessee, Knoxville; Harvard University (BA)
- Occupations: Playwright, screenwriter
- Spouse: Elizabeth Breyer
- Children: Owen Davis Jr. Donald Davis
- Writing career
- Pen name: John Oliver
- Notable awards: Pulitzer Prize for Drama (1923)

Owen Gould Davis (January 29, 1874 – October 14, 1956) was an American dramatist known for writing more than 200 plays and having most produced. In 1919, he became the first elected president of the Dramatists Guild of America. He received the 1923 Pulitzer Prize for Drama for his play Icebound, His plays and scripts included works for radio and film.

Before the First World War, he wrote racy sketches of New York high jinks and low life for the Police Gazette under the name of Ike Swift. Many of these were set in the Tenderloin, Manhattan. Davis also wrote under several other pseudonyms, including Martin Hurley, Arthur J. Lamb, Walter Lawrence, John Oliver, and Robert Wayne.

== Personal life ==
Davis was born into a large family in Portland, Maine. They moved to Bangor, where he lived until he was 15. As a boy, Davis wrote plays for his eight siblings, who performed them for the town. His parents were Owen Warren Davis, an iron manufacturer, and his wife Abigail Augusta Gould.

His brother William Hammatt Davis later served as chairman of the National War Labor Board in President Franklin D. Roosevelt's administration.

Davis attended the University of Tennessee in 1888–1889 and transferred to Harvard University in 1890, completing his degree there in three years. At Harvard, he was active with the Society of Arts drama organization. For a time, he coached a New York preparatory school's football team.

He married Elizabeth Drury Breyer, an actress, in 1901 or 1902, and they had two sons. Both entered the theater world; Owen Davis Jr. became an actor, and Donald Davis a playwright.

Davis lived in New York City for much of his life, and died there.

== Career ==
For the first two decades of his writing career, Davis produced melodramas that followed a formula. His entry in the Encyclopedia of American Drama notes, "The plays all contain life-threatening, visually exciting predicaments out of which the good emerge at the ultimate expense of the villains who put them there."

=== Stage ===
In 1897, Through the Breakers, Davis's first play, opened in Bridgeport, Connecticut. It ran for three years. His first Broadway play was Reaping the Whirlwind, which opened on September 17, 1900. He wrote or was otherwise involved in 75 additional Broadway productions, either under his own name or as John Oliver.

=== Film ===
Davis was on the staff of Paramount Pictures as a screenwriter from 1927 to 1930. His work during that time included They Had to See Paris (1929) and So This Is London (1930), both of which starred humorist Will Rogers.

=== Radio ===
Davis wrote scripts for the radio program The Gibson Family, which presented each episode in the form of a Broadway musical.

=== Books ===
Davis wrote two autobiographies, I'd Like to Do It Again, which was published in 1931, and My First Fifty Years in the Theatre, which focused on the years 1897–1947.

== Death ==
On October 13, 1956, Davis died in New York City at age 82. He had been suffering from a long illness and had recently been released from a hospital after three years. He was survived by his wife, their second son Donald, one of his brothers, William Hammatt Davis, and a sister, Perley Davis.

== Bibliography ==
- Sketches of Gotham (as Ike Swift) (1906)
- Nellie, the Beautiful Cloak Model (1906)
- Cupid at Vassar (1907)
- Deadwood Dick's Last Shot (1907)
- What Happened to Mary (1913)
- The Scrap of Paper (1917)
- The Detour (1921)
- Icebound (1923), for which he was awarded the Pulitzer Prize for Drama
  Adapted as a 1924 silent film Icebound, directed by William C. deMille
- The Nervous Wreck (1923), play, later adapted as a 1926 motion picture of the same name. Another adaptation was released in 1944 as Up in Arms]. A different adaptation was as a musical titled Whoopee!, staged on Broadway in 1928, produced as a film Whoopee!, and revived again as a musical in 1979.
- The Haunted House (1924)
- Lazybones (1924), made into the 1925 motion picture of the same name
- Beware of Widows (1925)
- Easy Come, Easy Go (1926); play later adapted as a musical, Lady Fingers (1929)
- The Great Gatsby (1926), play based on the F. Scott Fitzgerald novel of the same name. The play was adapted for the 1949 motion picture of the same name.
- Just to Remind You (1931), play which premiered at Lakewood Theatre in Maine, with Humphrey Bogart in lead
- The Good Earth (1932), dramatization of the Pearl S. Buck novel of the same name. A later adaptation was released as a film in 1937, also with the same name.
- Jezebel (1933), the successful play was adapted as 1938 motion picture of the same name
- The Convict's Sweetheart
- Ethan Frome (1935), play based on the Edith Wharton novel, produced on Broadway in 1936
- Mr. and Mrs. North (1941), dramatization from short stories by Richard and Frances Lockridge. This was adapted as a 1942 motion picture
- The Snark Was a Boojum (1943), dramatization of a novel by Richard Shattuck
- No Way Out (1944)
