= West End Theatre (Manhattan) =

Coordinates: 40.81073°N 73.95346°W

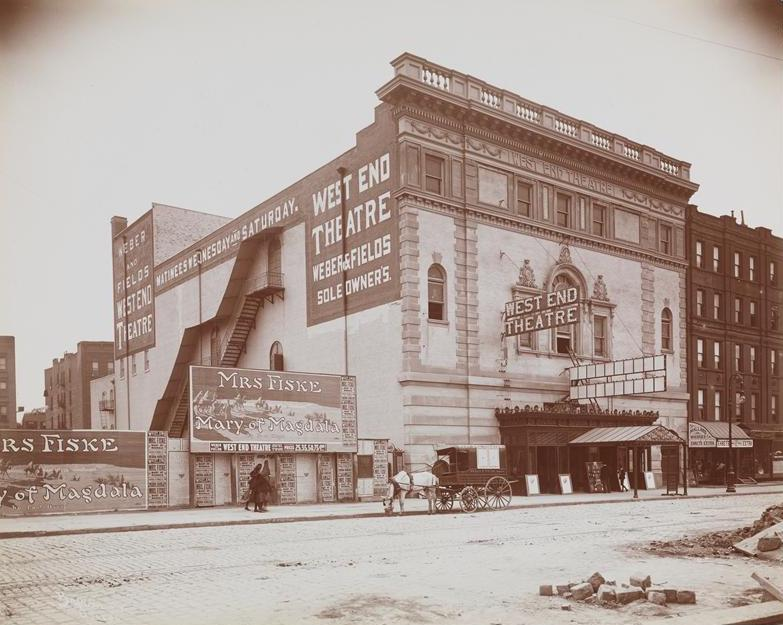
West End Theatre, 1903

Two theatres in Harlem, New York City, have been named West End Theatre. The first, of 1899, was abandoned after the foundation was built. It was on the northeast corner of 124th Street and Seventh Avenue, which is today known as Adam Clayton Powell Jr. Boulevard.

The second is at 362 West 125th Street, on the south side of the street, midway between Morningside Avenue and St. Nicholas Avenue (backing onto Hancock Place). Built by Meyer R. Bimberg and designed by Neville & Bragge in Spanish Baroque style, it opened November 3, 1902, and was sold to Weber & Fields on February 9, 1903.

Bimberg, who came to be known as Bim the Button Man, made his fortune selling campaign buttons. He built five theatres in New York City including what is now the Belasco Theatre.

The West End Theatre was acquired in 1975 by La Gree Baptist Church. It was sold to a real estate developer in July 2016 and plans for a new mixed-use (commercial and residential) building have been announced for the site.
