= Gerald Bordman =

American theatre historian (1931–2011)

Gerald Martin Bordman
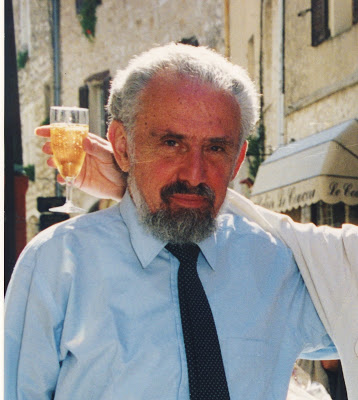
- Gerald Bordman circa 2005
- Born: September 18, 1931 Wynnefield, Philadelphia
- Died: May 9, 2011 (aged 79) Wynnewood, Pennsylvania
- Occupation: American theatre historian
- Citizenship: United States

Gerald Martin Bordman (September 18, 1931 – May 9, 2011) was an American theatre historian, best known for authoring the reference volume The American Musical Theatre, first published in 1978. In reviewing an updated version of American Musical Theatre in 2011, Playbill wrote that the book had "altered the scope of American musical theatre history" and "remained the only book of its kind, and an invaluable one."

Bordman grew up in the Wynnefield neighborhood of Philadelphia and graduated from Central High School and Lafayette College, later earning a master's degree and Ph.D. in medieval literature at the University of Pennsylvania. He published The American Musical Theatre four years after selling the family's business, Excell Chemical Products, which manufactured mothballs, among other things. He went on to write over a dozen volumes on American theatre, including biographies on Jerome Kern and Vincent Youmans, despite having limited musical training.

Bordman died of cancer in Wynnewood, Pennsylvania on May 9, 2011, at age 79.

== Partial bibliography ==
- American Musical Theatre: A Chronicle (1978)
- Jerome Kern: His Life and Music (1980)
- American Operetta: From H.M.S. Pinafore to Sweeney Todd (1981)
- Days to Be Happy, Years to Be Sad: The Life and Music of Vincent Youmans (1982)
- American Musical Comedy: From Adonis to Dreamgirls (1982)
- The Oxford Companion to the American Theater (1984)
- American Musical Revue: From The Passing Show to Sugar Babies (1985)
- American Theatre: A Chronicle of Comedy and Drama, 1869 - 1914 (1994)
- American Theatre: A Chronicle of Comedy and Drama, 1914 - 1930 (1995)
- American Theatre: A Chronicle of Comedy and Drama, 1930 - 1969 (1996)
