= Bedroom farce =

Type of light comedy, centered on the sexual pairings and recombinations of characters

A Cuckoo in the Nest is a 1920s bedroom farce.

A bedroom farce or sex farce is a type of light comedy focusing on the sexual pairings and recombinations of characters as they move through improbable plots and slamming doors.

== Overview ==
Georges Feydeau plays, presented in Paris in the 1890s, are considered forerunners. The Viennese playwright Arthur Schnitzler took bedroom farce to its highest dramatic level in his La Ronde, which in ten bedroom scenes connect the highest and lowest of Vienna.

Some of the English Aldwych farces by Ben Travers which were popular in the 1920s and 1930s have aspects of "bedroom farce", e.g. A Cuckoo in the Nest or Rookery Nook. However, in each case the sharing of a bedroom or house turns out to have an innocent explanation.

In modern times, Woody Allen's A Midsummer Night's Sex Comedy (1982) presents aspects of the bedroom farce. Michael Frayn's 1977 play Donkeys' Years is a classic bedroom farce; Frayn parodied the genre in his 1982 play Noises Off via its play-within-the-play, "Nothing On." Alan Ayckbourn's play, entitled Bedroom Farce, looks at the lives of three couples seen in their own bedrooms, the stage being split into three sets for this purpose. There is much humour in the play, although few if any of the usual conventions of farce are observed.

Boeing Boeing is a classic French farce for the stage by Marc Camoletti. Utilizing most of the conventions of bedroom farce's canon, it concerns a Parisian bachelor playboy with three international air stewardess fiancées he secretly keeps in careful rotation, until their flight schedules change and he, along with his provincial friend and sassy maid, must keep them from finding out about each other. Luckily they have enough doors in the apartment to keep the girls unwittingly flitting about for two hours.

American three-camera situation comedy, an extension of proscenium stage tradition, often includes elements of farce, specifically in several episodes of Three's Company, the "Woody's Wedding" episode of Cheers, "The Ski Lodge" episode of Frasier, and the "Love Car Displacement" episode of The Big Bang Theory.

Brian Rix performed many bedroom farces at the Garrick theatre in London, many of which were broadcast by the BBC.

British dramatist Ray Cooney, whose Run For Your Wife was the longest running-comedy in West End theater history, is a modern master of this genre.

== See also ==
- Farce
- Comédie en vaudevilles
