= December 1930 =

Month of 1930

<<	December 1930					>>
Su	Mo	Tu	We	Th	Fr	Sa
	1	2	3	4	5	6
7	8	9	10	11	12	13
14	15	16	17	18	19	20
21	22	23	24	25	26	27
28	29	30	31

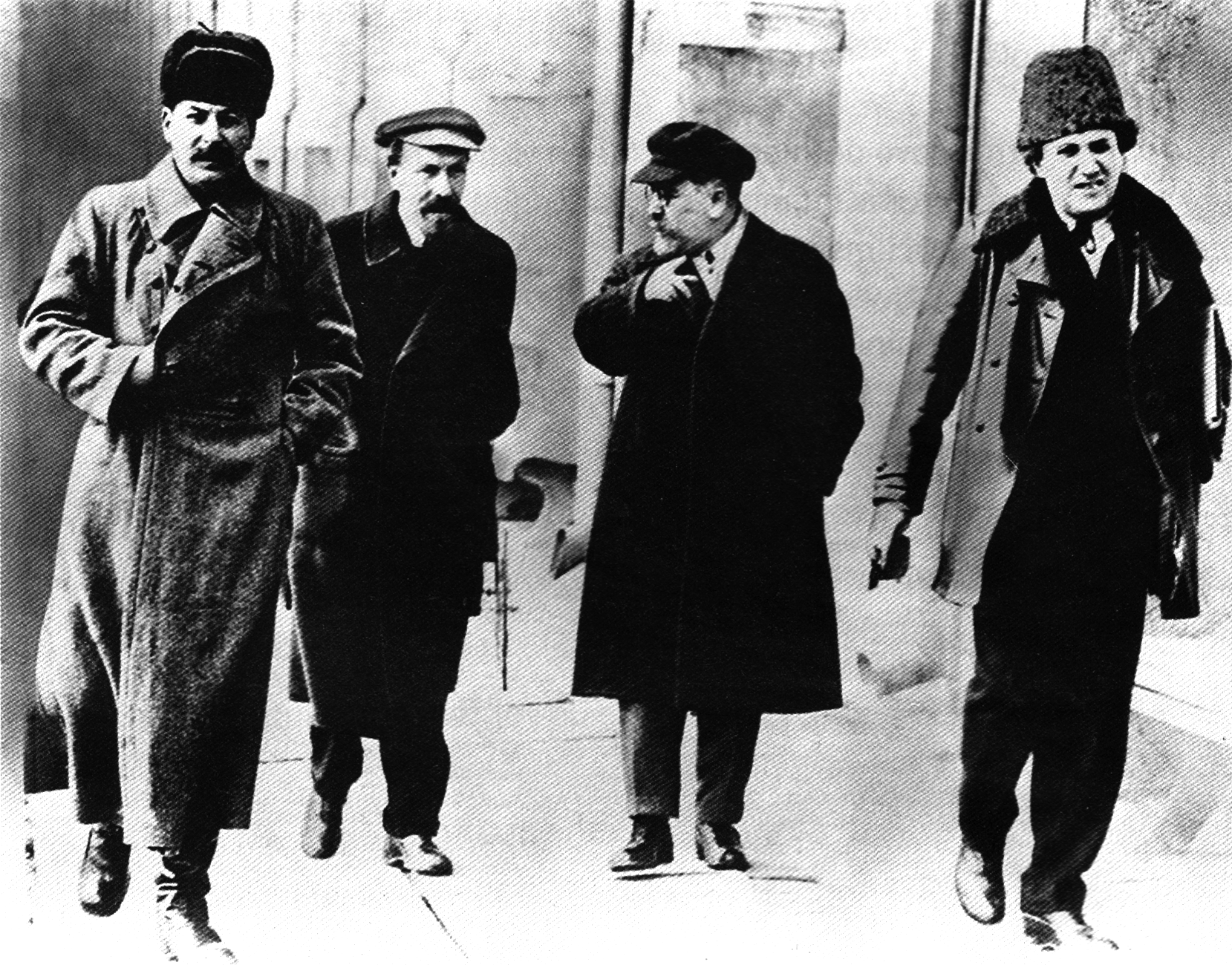
December 19 and 21, 1930: Soviet dictator Joseph Stalin dismisses Alexei Rykov (both on far left) from positions as Soviet Premier and Communist Party Politburo member

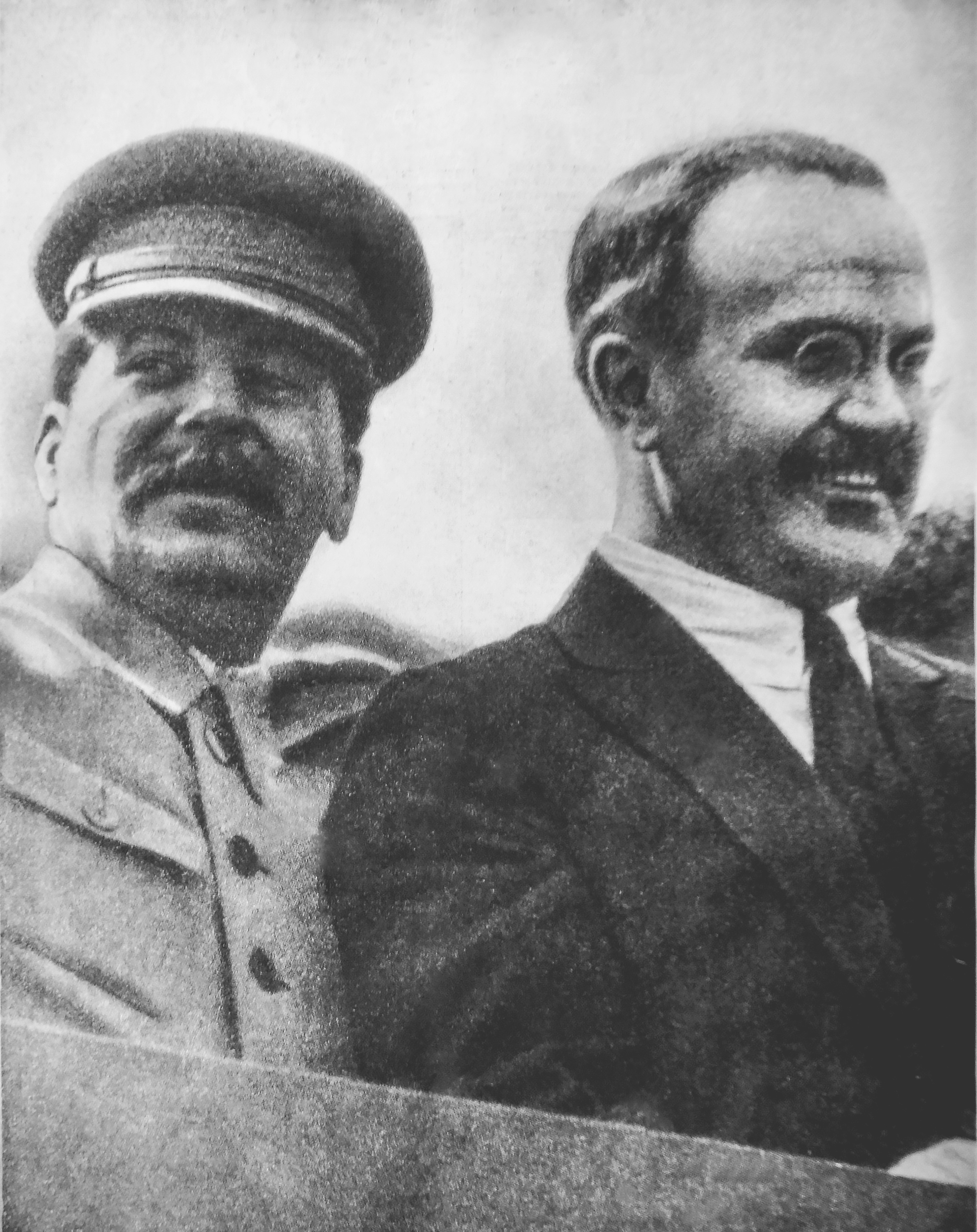
December 19, 1930: Stalin appoints Vyacheslav Molotov as new Soviet Premier

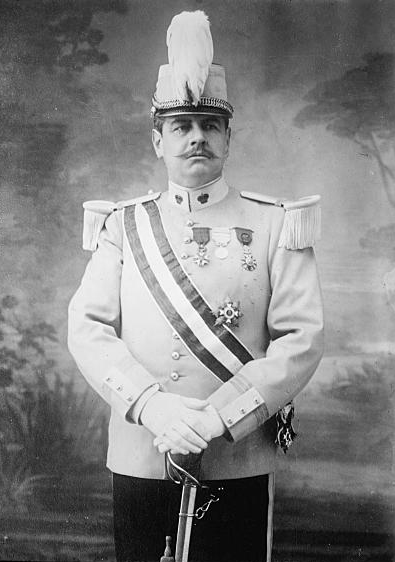
December 26, 1930: Prince Louis II declares dictatorship in Principality of Monaco

The following events occurred in December 1930:

== Monday, December 1, 1930 ==
- Seventy-five thousand Scottish coal miners went on strike as winter approached. The action coincided with a new British coal mining act taking effect which provided for a flat seven-and-a-half-hour working day unless the owners and the miner's federation agreed to a spreadover of 94 hours per fortnight.
- Born: Joachim Hoffmann, German historian, in Königsberg, Germany (now Kaliningrad, Russia (d. 2002)

== Tuesday, December 2, 1930 ==
- U.S. President Herbert Hoover gave his second State of the Union message to Congress. Like the previous year, it was delivered as a written message. "In the larger view", Hoover stated, "the major forces of the depression now lie outside the United States, and our recuperation has been retarded by the unwarranted degree of fear and apprehension created by these outside forces." Hoover reviewed what the government had done to cope with the economic crisis over the past year and asked Congress for up to $150 million to provide further employment through public works.
- Born: Gary Becker, U.S. economist and 1992 Nobel Prize laureate; in Pottsville, Pennsylvania (d. 2014)

== Wednesday, December 3, 1930 ==
- The Meuse Valley fog, complicated by industrial air pollution, began and caused hundreds of people in the Meuse Valley in Belgium to start experiencing severe respiratory problems. Over 60 people died in the next few days, most of them killed by fluorine gas that had drifted eastward from factories in the municipal village of Engis.
- German police raided a Nazi-occupied castle near Breslau along the Polish border, arresting hundreds of Brownshirts and seizing large quantities of arms and ammunition. The Nazis were organizing a defense force to protect "oppressed" Germans in Upper Silesia.
- The rebuilt Adelphi Theatre opened in London.
- Born: Jean-Luc Godard, French-Swiss film director and pioneer of the French New Wave film movement; in Paris (d. 2022)

== Thursday, December 4, 1930 ==
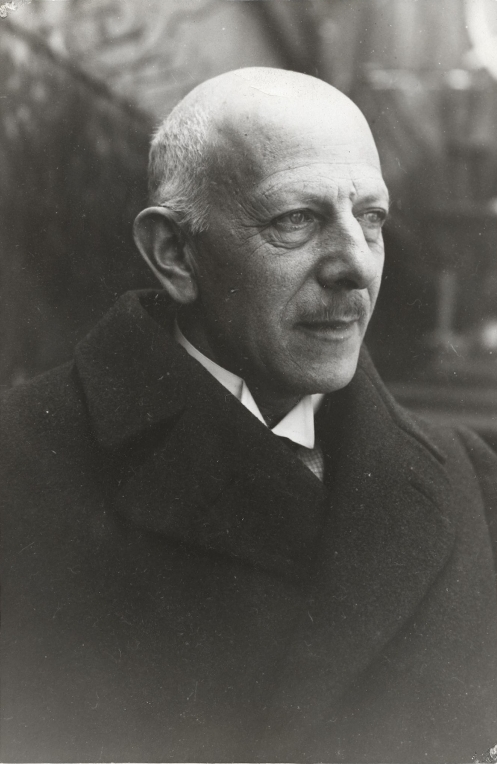
Chancellor Ender

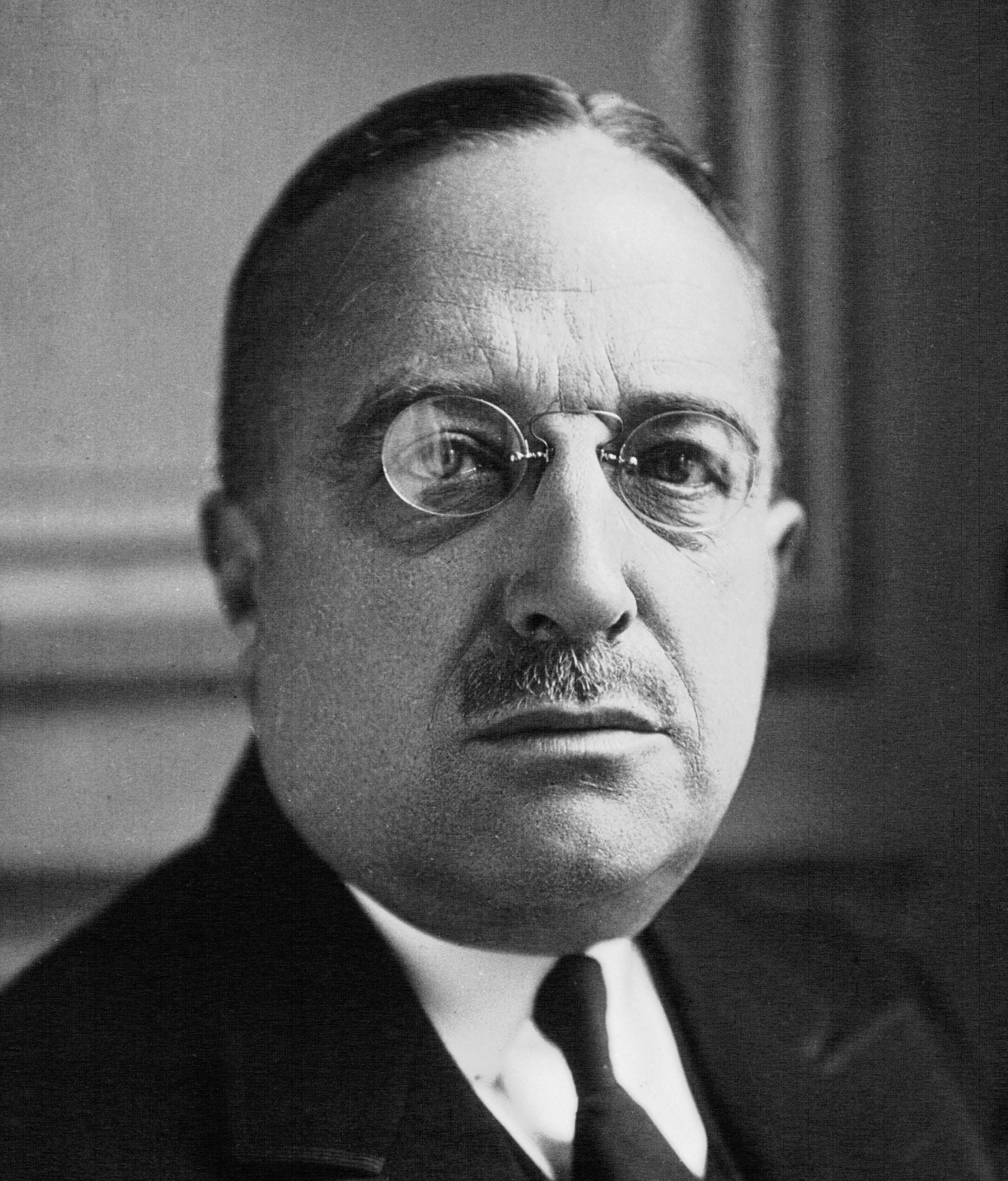
Premier Tardieu

- Otto Ender became Chancellor of Austria, forming a coalition government after elections for the 165-member National Council despite the second place finish of his Christian Social Party.
- French Prime Minister André Tardieu and his cabinet resigned after losing by 8 votes on a Senate motion of no confidence.
- Born:
  - Jim Hall, jazz musician, in Buffalo, New York (d. 2013)
  - Harvey Kuenn, American baseball player and manager, 1953 American League Rookie of the Year and 1959 AL batting champion; in West Allis, Wisconsin (d. 1988)

== Friday, December 5, 1930 ==
- The film All Quiet on the Western Front had its German premiere at the Berlin Mozartsaal. Nazis led by Joseph Goebbels disrupted the premiere by throwing smoke bombs and sneezing powder, and attacking members of the audience who protested the disturbance.
- Died: Raul Brandão, 63, Portuguese writer, journalist and military officer

== Saturday, December 6, 1930 ==
- The Toronto Balmy Beach Beachers defeated the Regina Roughriders 11 to 6 to win the 18th Grey Cup of Canadian football.
- Born: Daniel Lisulo, Prime Minister of Zambia 1978 to 1981; in Mongu (d. 2000)

== Sunday, December 7, 1930 ==
- The Industrial Party Trial ended in the Soviet Union, with five of the eight defendants sentenced to death and the other three given prison terms of three to ten years.
- Born: Christopher Nicole, British novelist and author of over 200 fiction and nonfiction books, under his own name and 13 other pen names including "Alan Sage", "Caroline Gray" and "Andrew York"; in Georgetown, Guyana (d. 2017)
- Died:
  - Noe Ramishvili, 49, Georgian independence activist who had briefly served as the first Prime Minister of the Democratic Republic of Georgia in 1918, and a Menshevik leader who had gone into exile after the Bolshevik triumph, was assassinated in Paris by a Georgian exile, Parmen Tchanoukvadzé.
  - Jesús Flores Magón, 59, Mexican politician, journalist and lawyer

== Monday, December 8, 1930 ==
- Three Indian independence activists of the Bengal Volunteers (Benoy Basu, Dinesh Gupta and Badal Gupta) entered the Writers' Building at Dalhousie Square in Calcutta, and assassinated Colonel N.S. Simpson. Simpson, the Inspector General of the Indian Imperial Police prison system, was infamous for his brutal treatment of Indian prisoners.
- The Soviet Union reduced the five death sentences handed down in the Industrial Party Trial to ten years' imprisonment. An official bulletin explained that the decision was made because the sentenced men had "repented their crimes" and "because soviet power cannot be guided by a mere desire for revenge".
- The Cole Porter stage musical The New Yorkers made its Broadway debut at the Broadway Theatre.
- Black Coffee, the first play written by the crime novelist Agatha Christie, premiered at the Embassy Theatre in London, with Francis L. Sullivan in the role of detective Hercule Poirot.
- Born:
  - Maximilian Schell, Austrian-born Swiss film star, 1961 winner of the Academy Award for Best Actor, director and producer; in Vienna (d. 2014)
  - Stan Richards (stage name for Stanley Richardson), English TV actor (Emmerdale); in Barnsley, South Yorkshire (d. 2005)

== Tuesday, December 9, 1930 ==
- Five Italian communists were sentenced to prison terms of three to ten years for spreading propaganda in Turin.
- Born:
  - Buck Henry (stage name for Henry Zuckerman), American comedian, writer and director, in New York City (d. 2020)
  - Edoardo Sanguineti, Italian poet, writer and academic, in Genoa (d. 2010)

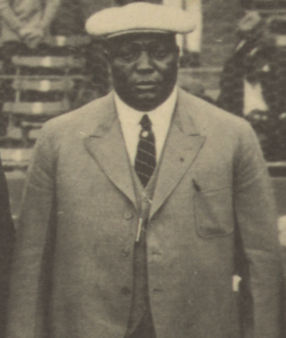
Foster

- Died:
  - Rube Foster, 51, African-American baseball pitcher and Baseball Hall of Fame enshrinee known as "The father of Black Baseball" for creating the Negro National League in 1920
  - Laura Muntz Lyall, 70, Canadian impressionist painter

== Wednesday, December 10, 1930 ==
- The 1930 Nobel Prizes were awarded in Stockholm. The recipients were Sir Chandrasekhara Venkata Raman of India for Physics, Hans Fischer of Germany (Chemistry), Karl Landsteiner of Austria (Physiology or Medicine), Sinclair Lewis of the United States (Literature), while in Oslo Nathan Söderblom was awarded the Peace Prize.
- Brooklyn and the Bronx were the scenes of massive bank runs as crowds of 20,000 to 25,000 people lined up for hours in desperation to withdraw their money before closing time. Armored cars drove extra cash to besieged branches to meet the demand.
- The Bertolt Brecht play The Decision premiered.

== Thursday, December 11, 1930 ==
- Germany's board of film censors banned All Quiet on the Western Front from the country, explaining that the film dwelled too much on Germany's defeat and painted an inaccurate picture of its military. The Nazis, who had disrupted screenings of the film for all six days of its release, hailed the decision as a great victory and a "vindication of German honour."
- The Bank of United States and its 59 branches were closed and its assets taken over by the New York State Superintendent of Banks.
- U.S. mobster Bugs Moran was acquitted of vagrancy charges by a jury in an Illinois court.
- Born:
  - Jean-Louis Trintignant, French film actor, screenwriter and director, and 2013 César Awards winner for Best Actor; in Piolenc, Vaucluse (d. 2022)
  - James Arthur Williams, U.S. antique dealer and historic preservationist, in Gordon, Georgia (d. 1990)

== Friday, December 12, 1930 ==
- The Jaca uprising, a military revolution attempting to overthrow the Spanish monarchy, broke out at military garrison in the town of Jaca in northeastern Spain.
- The Arthur Honegger operetta Les aventures du roi Pausole premiered at the Théâtre des Bouffes-Parisiens in Paris.
- The surrealist film L'Age d'Or (The Golden Age) was banned in France.
- Died: Nikolai Pokrovsky, 65, the last Foreign Minister of the Russian Empire during the reign of the Russian Tsars.

== Saturday, December 13, 1930 ==
- The Spanish government swiftly crushed the uprising in Jaca.

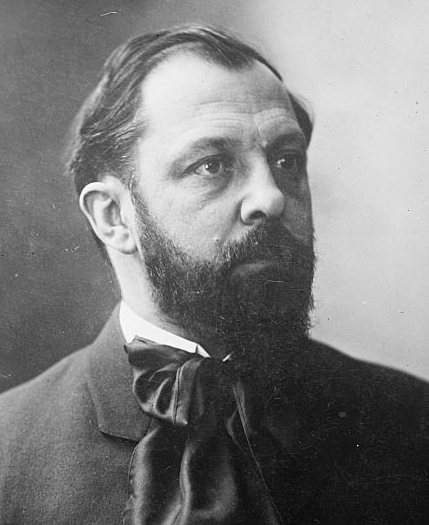
Steeg

- Théodore Steeg became the new Prime Minister of France.
- Army defeated Navy, 6 to 0 in the Army–Navy Game at Yankee Stadium. It was the first time the two teams had met in three years; the game had not been played in 1928 or 1929 due to a controversy regarding player eligibility.
- Born: Robert Prosky, American actor, in Philadelphia (d. 2008)
- Died: Fritz Pregl, Slovenian and Austrian chemist and physician

== Sunday, December 14, 1930 ==
- The glass-bottomed tour boat Eureka II had an engine room explosion and sank south of Miami. Three people died but the other 135 on board were rescued.
- Two Spanish army officers were executed by firing squad following a drumhead court-martial for the Jaca uprising.
- Died: F. Richard Jones, 37, American film director and producer, from tuberculosis

== Monday, December 15, 1930 ==
- Ramón Franco, the younger brother of future Spanish dictator Francisco Franco, together with general Gonzalo Queipo de Llano, launched a revolt against King Alfonso XIII of Spain as leader of 500 other insurgents. The group started from Cuatro Vientos Airport, sending wireless messages and dropping leaflets from airplanes proclaiming a republic. Spanish troops responded by shelling the airport and the rebellion was broken up, with Ramón Franco escaping the country by plane to Portugal.
- Chicago Stadium, an arena used by the National Hockey League's Chicago Blackhawks, hosted the first indoor game in National Football League history. Before an estimated 10,000 fans, the Chicago Bears defeated the crosstown Cardinals, 9 to 7.
- Al Capone's 18-year-old sister Mafalda married John J. Mariote, the younger brother of Legs Diamond. This marriage between relatives of the bosses of two rival gangs contributed to a temporary truce among members of organized crime in Chicago.
- Born: Edna O'Brien, Irish author, poet and playwright, in Tuamgraney, County Clare (d. 2024)
- Died: Diane Ellis, American actress (b. 1909)

== Tuesday, December 16, 1930 ==
- Eleven banks closed in North Carolina.
- The Spanish football team Real Madrid Castilla was founded.
- Born: Sam Most, jazz flautist and tenor saxophonist; in Atlantic City, New Jersey (d. 2013)

== Wednesday, December 17, 1930 ==
- The Central Executive Committee of the Soviet Union published a decree forbidding workers to change jobs without government permission.
- Born: Armin Mueller-Stahl, German stage, and East German TV (and after 1980, West German film) actor, painter, writer and musician, in Tilsit, East Prussia (now Sovetsk in Russia)
- Died: Peter Warlock (stage name for Philip Arnold Heseltine), 36, British composer and music critic, from accidental or intentional carbon monoxide poisoning

== Thursday, December 18, 1930 ==
- The Soviet government forcibly closed the Japanese-Korean bank in Vladivostok and seized its assets, accusing the bank of violating the Soviet money trading rules.
- The George Fitzmaurice-directed romantic drama film The Devil to Pay!, starring Ronald Colman and Loretta Young, premiered at the Gaiety Theatre in New York City.
- Born: Bill Skowron, American baseball first baseman; in Chicago (d. 2012)

== Friday, December 19, 1930 ==
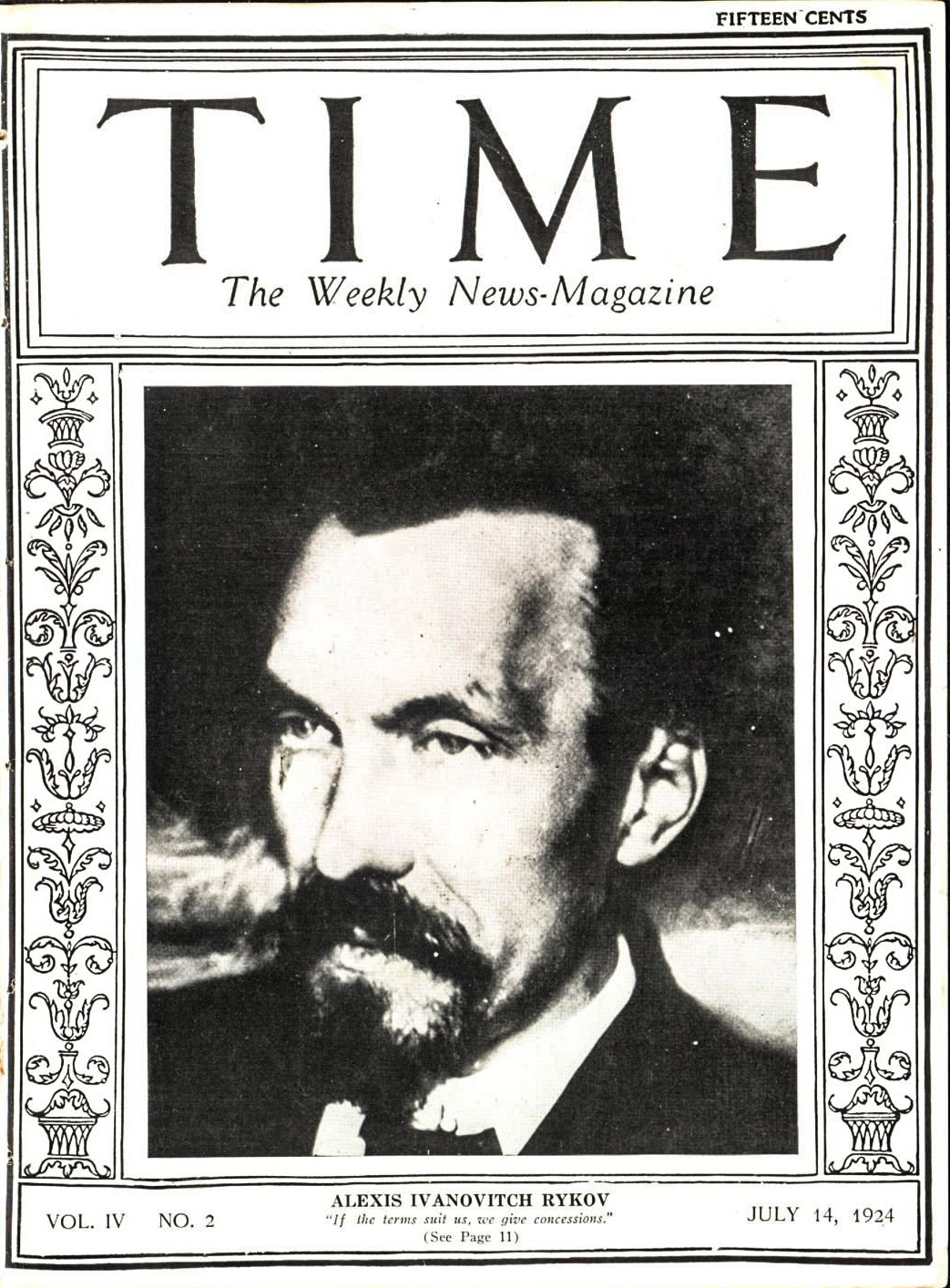
Rykov

- Alexei Rykov was ousted as Chairman of the Council of People's Commissars of the Soviet Union (equivalent to the Premier of the U.S.S.R.) after falling out of favor with Soviet Party general secretary Joseph Stalin, and was replaced by Vyacheslav Molotov In 1938, Rykov would be executed along with 17 other former Party officials after being accused and convicted of treason against Stalin's government.
- The Finland Steamship Company (Finska Ångfartygs Aktiebolag or FAA) passenger ships Oberon and Arcturus collided in a fog off of the coast of Denmark near the port of Læsø. The Oberon sank with the loss of 42 of the 82 people on board. Coincidentally, the captain of the Oberon was the brother of the captain of the Arcturus.
- Japan sent a note of protest to the Soviet Union, calling its closure of the Japanese-Korean bank an "unfriendly act".
- Retired French General and World War I hero Joseph Joffre had his right foot amputated in an attempt to save his life as gangrene set in. The operation was kept a secret for eight days. General Joffre died 15 days later on January 3.

== Saturday, December 20, 1930 ==
- President Hoover signed a $110 million emergency construction bill and a $45 million drought relief bill as part of a program of federal aid made necessary by the Great Depression.
- Born: Pat Hare, American blues guitarist and singer, in Cherry Valley, Arkansas (d. 1980)

== Sunday, December 21, 1930 ==
- Soviet dictator Joseph Stalin had Alexei Rykov, recently ousted as Russia's Premier, expelled from the Politburo of the Soviet Communist Party.
- Born:
  - Kalevi Sorsa, three-time Prime Minister of Finland between 1972 and 1987; in Keuruu (d. 2004)
  - Adebayo Adedeji, Nigerian economist and Executive Secretary of the United Nations Economic Commission for Africa; in Ijebu Ode (d. 2018)
  - Phil Roman, American television animator and director known for adapting print characters to TV, as in How the Grinch Stole Christmas! and specials based on the Peanuts and Garfield comic strips; in Fresno, California

== Monday, December 22, 1930 ==
- The Central Executive Committee of the Soviet Union published a decree calling for a complete revision of the country's food distribution system.
- Died: Charles K. Harris, 63, American popular songwriter and best selling sheet music creations, known for his sentimental ballads such as "Hello Central, Give Me Heaven"

== Tuesday, December 23, 1930 ==
- Former Indiana governor Warren T. McCray was granted a pardon by U.S. President Hoover. McCray had served three years in prison for fraud.
- Died: Mustafa Fehmi Kubilay, Turkish teacher and military officer, murdered and beheaded during Menemen Incident (born 1906)

== Wednesday, December 24, 1930 ==
- In his Christmas Eve message, Pope Pius XI warned against "blind nationalism" and encouraged increased cooperation between nations to secure world peace.
- Born: Mel Triplett, American NFL football player; in Indianola, Mississippi (d. 2002)

== Thursday, December 25, 1930 ==
- The German film Storm over Mont Blanc directed by Arnold Fanck and starring Leni Riefenstahl premiered in Dresden.
- Born: Salah Jahin, Egyptian poet, lyricist, playwright and cartoonist; in Cairo (d. 1986)

== Friday, December 26, 1930 ==
- Louis II, Prince of Monaco suspended the European principality's Constitution in a surprise move.
- A bout to unify the world flyweight boxing title was held in Madison Square Garden, between National Boxing Association (NBA) champion Frankie Genaro, and New York State Athletic Commission (NYSAC) titleholder Midget Wolgast (ring name for Joseph Loscalzo). The bout ended in a draw and both men kept their titles.

== Saturday, December 27, 1930 ==
- Thirty people were killed when a landslide crashed down on a house in Algiers where a wedding was being celebrated, following heavy rains in French Algeria.
- Born: Wilfrid Sheed, English-born American novelist; in London (d. 2011)

== Sunday, December 28, 1930 ==
- German dancer Mary Wigman made her American debut to a sold-out house at Chanin's 46th Street Theatre in New York.
- Born:
  - Mariam A. Aleem, Egyptian artist and professor (d. 2010)
  - Gladys Ambrose, English film and TV actress; in Everton, Liverpool (d. 1998)

== Monday, December 29, 1930 ==
- An article by Filippo Tommaso Marinetti, the Italian Futurist, was published in the Gazzetta del Popolo, in which he called for the abolition of pasta in favour of Futurist meals. Marinetti explained that pasta was hard to digest and made Italians "skeptical, slow [and] pessimistic", in addition to requiring heavy importation to Italy. Marinetti argued that rice, on the other hand, would create "lithe, agile peoples who will be victorious" in future wars and that the grain was already being homegrown in vast amounts. Marinetti's manifesto also called for the abolition of the knife and fork.
- The Econometric Society, an international society for the advancement of economic theory in its relation to statistics and mathematics, was founded in the U.S. by 16 professional statisticians at the Stalton Hotel in Cleveland.
- Died: Walter L. Cohen, 70, African-American politician who had served as the Registrar of the U.S. Land Office for President Theodore Roosevelt and later as U.S. Comptroller of Customs for President Harding.

== Tuesday, December 30, 1930 ==
- The Colonial National Monument in Virginia was proclaimed by President Hoover.
- The Louis Weitzenkorn play Five Star Final premiered at the Cort Theatre in New York City.

== Wednesday, December 31, 1930 ==
- Adolphus Busch Orthwein, the 13-year-old grandson of Anheuser-Busch CEO August Anheuser Busch, Sr., was kidnapped by a masked gunman in Huntleigh, Missouri, and held for ransom. The father of the boy's kidnapper rescued the child and returned him to the Orthwein family the next day. His father was Percy Orthwein and his mother, Clara Busch.
- Pope Pius XI promulgated the encyclical Casti connubii.
- Born:
  - Jaime Escalante, Bolivian-born U.S. high school mathematics teacher profiled in the 1988 film drama Stand and Deliver; in La Paz (d. 2010)
  - Odetta Holmes, African-American musician, actress and civil rights activist known by her stage name Odetta; in Birmingham, Alabama (d. 2008)
