= The Devil Is Driving =

The Devil Is Driving may refer to:

- The Devil Is Driving (1932 film), 1932 film directed by Benjamin Stoloff and starring Edmund Lowe
- The Devil Is Driving (1937 film), 1937 film directed by Harry Lachman and starring Richard Dix, Joan Perry and Nana Bryant
