= Two Against the World =

Two Against the World may refer to:

- Two Against the World (1932 film), directed by Archie Mayo
- Two Against the World (1936 film), directed by William C. McGann
