= Five Star Final =

1931 film

- 1931 Theatrical Poster
- Directed by: Mervyn LeRoy
- Written by: Byron Morgan; Robert Lord
- Based on: Five Star Final; 1930 play by Louis Weitzenkorn
- Produced by: Hal B. Wallis (uncredited)
- Starring: Edward G. Robinson; Marian Marsh; Boris Karloff
- Cinematography: Sol Polito
- Edited by: Frank Ware
- Production company: First National Pictures
- Distributed by: Warner Bros. Pictures
- Release date: September 26, 1931
- Running time: 89 minutes
- Country: United States
- Language: English
- Budget: $310,000
- Box office: $822,000

Five Star Final is a 1931 American pre-Code drama film about the excesses of tabloid journalism directed by Mervyn LeRoy and starring Edward G. Robinson, Aline MacMahon (in her screen debut) and Boris Karloff. The screenplay was by Robert Lord and Byron Morgan based on the 1930 play of the same name by Louis Weitzenkorn. The title refers to the practice of newspapers publishing a series of editions throughout the day, with their final-edition front page having five stars printed and the word "Final." "Five Star Final" is also a font introduced during World War I then favored by newspapers for its narrow type.

Warner Bros. remade the film in 1936 as Two Against the World, also known as One Fatal Hour, starring Humphrey Bogart in Robinson's part and set in a radio station instead of at a newspaper.

The film was nominated at the 5th Academy Awards (1931/1932) for Best Picture, but lost to Grand Hotel.

Newspaper publisher William Randolph Hearst was greatly offended by the film, which he interpreted as a thinly veiled attack on him and his operation. He retaliated by publishing negative reviews in his papers and pressuring theaters not to show the film.

== Plot ==
Joseph W. Randall is the managing editor of the New York Evening Gazette tabloid newspaper, who has been trying to legitimize the paper by reducing sensationalism and improving the reporting, but circulation has dropped dramatically. When publisher Bernard Hinchecliffe plans to boost sales by running a retrospective series on a 20-year-old murder, hoping to thereby revive the scandal, Randall reluctantly agrees. He had covered the original story about stenographer Nancy Voorhees, who shot her boss after he impregnated her and then reneged on his promise to marry her. Her pregnancy won the jury's sympathy, and she was acquitted.

Unaware of impending doom, Nancy is now married to Michael Townsend, an upstanding member of society, and her daughter Jenny, who believes that Townsend is her father, is about to marry the son of a socially prominent family, Philip Weeks.

Randall throws himself into the assignment. To dig up dirt on Nancy, he assigns unscrupulous reporter T. Vernon Isopod, who masquerades as a minister and wins the confidence of the bride's parents on the eve of the wedding. They, having read the headlines promising a new series on the murder, are horrified at the renewed interest in the scandal, and confess their concerns to Isopod, whom they mistake for a church representative, and give him a photo of Jenny. Michael realizes the horrible mistake just as Isopod leaves, and he phones the church.

Randall's secretary Miss Taylor is so disgusted that she gets drunk at a local speakeasy and then tells Randall what she thinks of the whole affair. Isopod comes in late, drunk and brimming with information. Randall swings into action, mocking up a photo layout.

Randall sends reporters Ziggie and Carmody to cover the Townsend apartment. Nancy and Michael, hoping to prevent the revelation of the full story and save the marriage, make separate appeals for help: Michael visits the church rector, who promises support; Nancy phones Randall, begging him to drop the story, but he refuses, telling her that it is too late. Nancy kills herself by taking poison, and Michael comes home and discovers her body in the bathroom. When Jenny and Philip visit soon afterward, Michael does not inform them of the suicide, feigning a phone conversation with Nancy. After sending Jenny and Philip away, telling him he and Nancy will meet the at the church, he enters the bathroom and also commits suicide. Carmody and Ziggie climb into the apartment from the fire escape. When they open the bathroom door, they take a photograph and call the information into Randall, who wants the story for the five-star final.

The next day, Phillip's parents tell Jenny that the wedding will be called off, but Phillip arrives and defies them. Randall gets drunk and feels like a murderer. He tells the night desk to drop the story.

Hinchecliff is leery of the bad publicity that may result from the inquest, but his underlings are thrilled at the upsurge in numbers and want to offer Jenny $1,200 for the rights to tell her mother's story. Randall opposes the idea. Jenny visits the paper and demands that the men tell her why they killed her mother. A guilt-ridden and disgusted Randall tells her that they were killed for the purpose of circulation. Jenny points a gun at Randall but Philip appears just in time to prevent her from pulling the trigger. Phillip then angrily delivers a chilling speech that ends: "You've grown rich on filth and no one's ever dared rise up and crush you out." He threatens to hunt them down and kill them if his wife's name is ever mentioned in the paper again.

Randall denounces Hinchecliffe and resigns. He runs out and Miss Taylor follows him.

A copy of the New York Evening Gazette trumpeting the news that the suicide victims have been buried is shown swept away in the rain.

== Cast ==
- Edward G. Robinson as Joseph W. Randall
- Marian Marsh as Jenny Townsend
- H.B. Warner as Michael Townsend
- Anthony Bushell as Phillip Weeks
- George E. Stone as Ziggie Feinstein
- Frances Starr as Nancy (Voorhees) Townsend
- Ona Munson as Kitty Carmody
- Boris Karloff as T. Vernon Isopod
- Aline MacMahon as Miss Taylor
- Oscar Apfel as Bernard Hinchecliffe
- Purnell Pratt as Robert French
- Robert Elliott as R.J. Brannegan
- William H. Strauss as Jerry - Bartender

Cast notes

- This was the first film that Marian Marsh made under that name; she had previously appeared as Marilyn Morgan.
- Aline MacMahon made her film debut in Five Star Final.

== Production ==
The film was based on a play written by Louis Weitzenkorn after his stint as editor of Bernarr Macfadden's New York Evening Graphic, a sensationalist tabloid of the 1920s. The play ran for 175 performances on Broadway in 1930 and 1931.

Producer Hal B. Wallis wanted the press room set to appear authentic, and sent Warner Bros. staff members to study the design of two actual newspaper offices. The film was in production from April 14 through May 11, 1931.

The film was made in the same year as was Little Caesar, Robinson's breakthrough film. Cast member Boris Karloff also broke through with his iconic portrayal of the monster in Frankenstein later that same year.

== Box office ==
According to Warner Bros. records, the film earned $665,000 domestically and $157,000 foreign.

== Awards and honors ==
Five Star Final was nominated for an Outstanding Production Academy Award in 1931/1932 at the 5th Annual Academy Awards and was named by Film Daily as one of the ten best films of 1931.
