= February 1931 =

Month of 1931

<<	February 1931					>>
Su	Mo	Tu	We	Th	Fr	Sa
1	2	3	4	5	6	7
8	9	10	11	12	13	14
15	16	17	18	19	20	21
22	23	24	25	26	27	28

The following events occurred in February 1931:

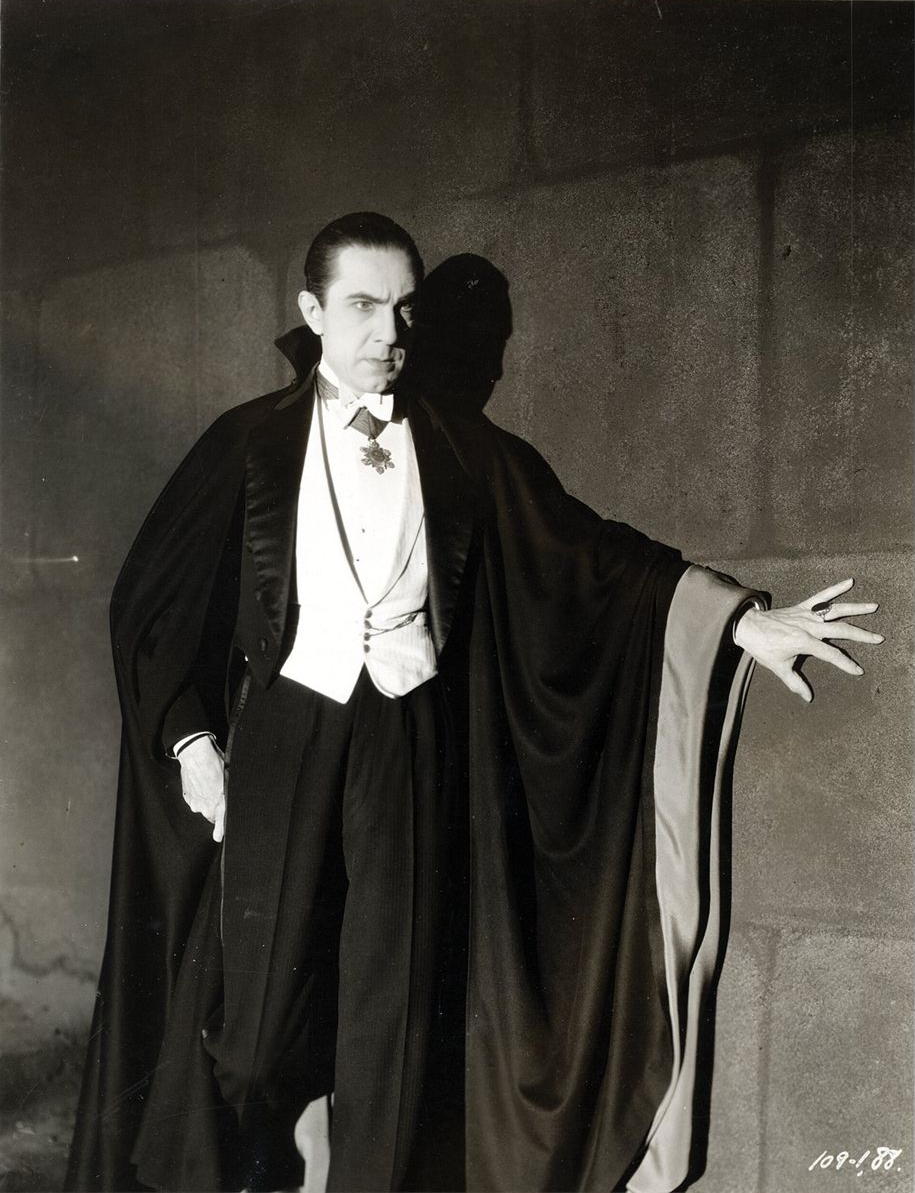
February 12, 1931: Bela Lugosi introduces film audiences to Count Dracula

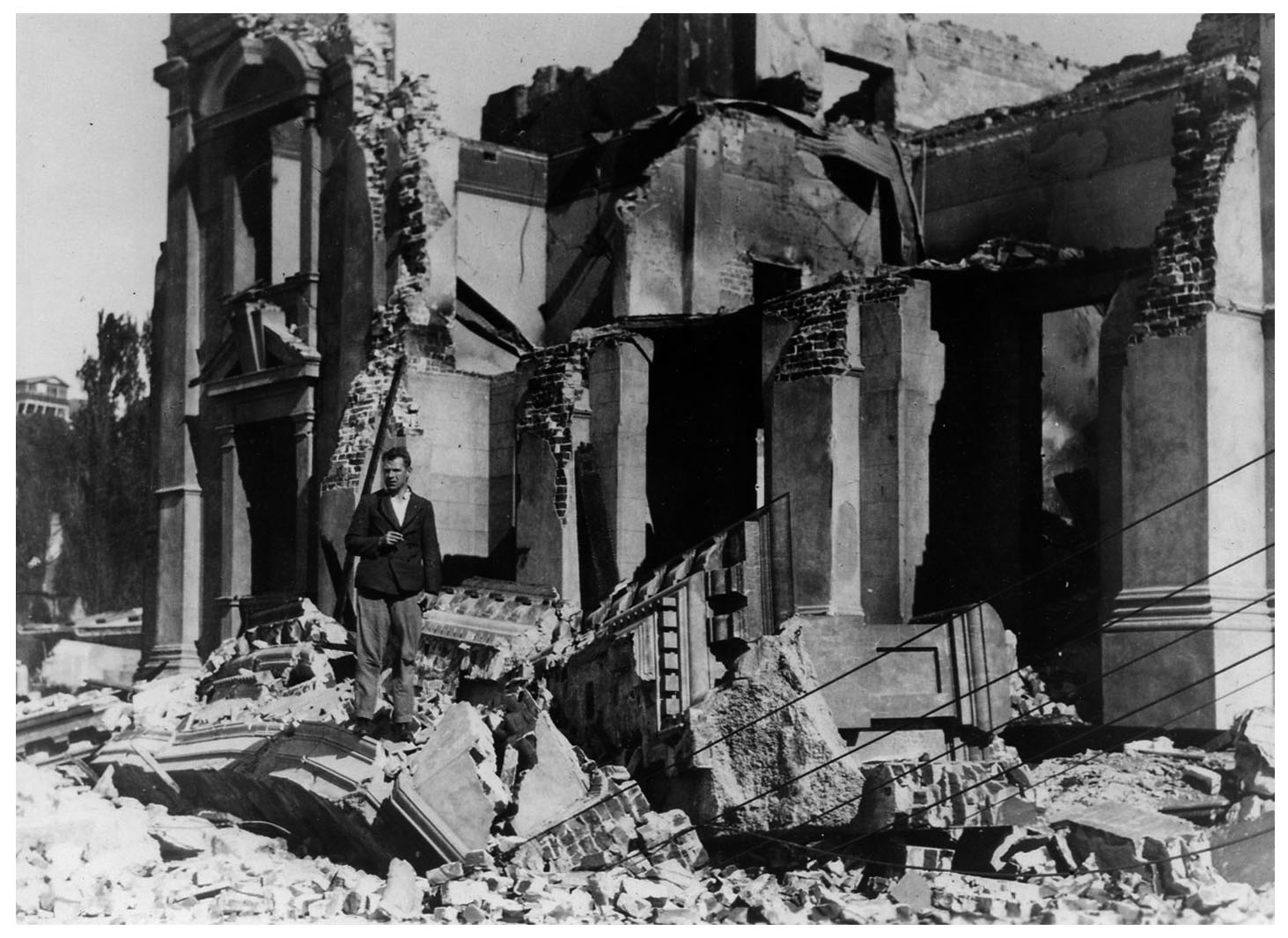
February 3, 1931: Earthquake kills 246 people in and around city of Napier, New Zealand

== Sunday, February 1, 1931 ==
- The Mahatma Gandhi and the Indian National Congress voted unanimously to continue their civil disobedience campaign. Gandhi declared that all political prisoners must be released before the Congress would deal with the government.
- Two anarchists were executed by firing squad in Buenos Aires for the bombing of the Italian consulate in 1928.
- Born: Boris Yeltsin, former Soviet Communist politician and President of Russia from 1991 to 1999; in Butka, RSFSR, Soviet Union (d. 2007)

== Monday, February 2, 1931 ==
- The foreign affairs committee of the Reichstag rejected a demand from Nazi deputies to have Germany withdraw from the League of Nations.
- Born:
  - Dries van Agt, Prime Minister of the Netherlands from 1977 to 1982; in Geldrop (d. 2024)
  - Les Dawson, English comedian; in Collyhurst, Manchester (d. 1993)
  - Hillel Zaks, Polish-born Israeli rabbi, in Radun (d. 2015)

== Tuesday, February 3, 1931 ==
- The Hawke's Bay earthquake killed 256 people in New Zealand and devastated the region around Hawke's Bay.
- The state legislature of Arkansas passed a motion to pray for the soul of the satirical writer H. L. Mencken after he called the state "the Apex of Moronia".
- At the Piazza Colonna in Rome, authorities moved to arrest two anarchists, one of them the naturalized American Michele Schirru, for plotting to assassinate Benito Mussolini. One anarchist fled, but Schirru pulled out a gun and killed one policeman. Schirru then shot himself, but survived to face trial.
- The adventure film Trader Horn premiered at the Astor Theatre in New York City.

== Wednesday, February 4, 1931 ==
- A Royal Air Force Blackburn Iris flying boat plunged into Plymouth Sound and exploded, killing 9 of its crew. One of the first to the rescue was T. E. Lawrence, then stationed at the RAF Mount Batten.
- The National League adopted a new, deader baseball for the 1931 season in an effort to cut down on very high scoring rates.
- Buster Keaton got into a violent brawl with his mistress, the actress Kathleen Key, until MGM studio police rushed into Keaton's dressing room and hauled Key away. The fight made national headlines, but MGM had Keaton make up an explanation that they were arguing over a bet they'd made that the actress could lose 20 pounds in ten days. Keaton then cut a secret $10,000 check to Key in order to keep their love affair out of the press.
- Born: Isabel Perón, president of Argentina from 1974 to 1976, the first woman to serve as president of a country.

== Thursday, February 5, 1931 ==
- At Daytona Beach, British racer Malcolm Campbell set a new land speed record of 245.733 mph.

== Friday, February 6, 1931 ==
- Kijūrō Shidehara made a speech in the Japanese National Diet in which he explained that Emperor Hirohito's approval of the London Naval Treaty was confirmation that it did not endanger the country's security. Opposition members took this to mean that any defects in the treaty were a reflection on the emperor, and one member pulled out a dagger during the ensuing debate. Shidehara left the building under heavy guard as a brawl broke out in an anteroom of the Diet, injuring 12.
- Born:
  - Rip Torn (stage name for Elmore Torn Jr.), U.S. film and TV actor and comedian; in Temple, Texas (d. 2019)
  - Mamie Van Doren (stage name for Joan Olander), U.S. actress, model and singer, in Rowena, South Dakota

== Saturday, February 7, 1931 ==
- Aviator Amelia Earhart and publisher George P. Putnam were married in Noank, Connecticut, in a five-minute ceremony.

== Sunday, February 8, 1931 ==
- A gas explosion and ensuing fire at a mine in Fushun, Manchuria, killed 3,000 people.
- King Alfonso XIII of Spain published a royal decree calling elections for the chamber of deputies on March 1 and for the senate on March 15, the first elections since before the dictatorship of Miguel Primo de Rivera. The decree also restored freedoms of speech and assembly for the duration of the election period.
- Canada won the fifth World Ice Hockey Championships held in Poland.
- U.S. Secretary of the Navy Charles Francis Adams III announced that court martial proceedings against Smedley Butler had been dropped and that Butler had been let off with a formal reprimand.
- Born:
  - James Dean, American film actor known for Rebel Without a Cause; in Marion, Indiana (killed in auto accident, 1955)
  - Kenneth M. Curtis, American lawyer and former politician.
  - Shadia, Egyptian actress/singer (d. 2017).
  - Béla Andrásfai, Hungarian mathematician (d. 2023).

== Monday, February 9, 1931 ==
- The South Wales mining strike ended with a three-year peace settlement.
- Born: Thomas Bernhard, Dutch novelist, playwright and poet; in Heerlen (d. 1989)

== Tuesday, February 10, 1931 ==
- Several days of festivities began marking the transfer of the capital of India to New Delhi.
- The 107 Nazi deputies of the Reichstag walked out and began a boycott of parliament in protest of new reforms which included the removal of parliamentary immunity from deputies against whom court cases were pending. The German National People's Party joined in the boycott.

== Wednesday, February 11, 1931 ==
- Chancellor of the Exchequer Philip Snowden warned the House of Commons, "I say with all the seriousness I can command that the national position is so grave that drastic and disagreeable measures will have to be taken if Budget equilibrium is to be maintained and if industrial progress is to be made ... No Budget in the world could stand such an excessive strain as that which has been placed upon it by the increase of unemployment during the last 12 months."
- Born: Larry Merchant, American sportswriter and commentator, in Brooklyn
- Died:
  - Charles Dryden, 70, American sports writer and humorist
  - Charles Algernon Parsons, 76, British engineer known for the invention of the compound steam turbine

== Thursday, February 12, 1931 ==
- The horror film Dracula, starring Bela Lugosi, premiered at the Roxy Theatre in New York City.
- Vatican Radio first began broadcasting.
- Japan conducted its first television broadcast, showing a baseball game.

== Friday, February 13, 1931 ==
- New Delhi became the capital of India.
- The Lancashire cotton weaver's lockout ended when the owners capitulated and agreed to let the weavers keep their old pay scale and working hours.
- Born: Geoff Edwards, American television actor, radio personality and TV game show host, in Westfield, New Jersey (d. 2014)

== Saturday, February 14, 1931 ==
- Dámaso Berenguer resigned as Prime Minister of Spain. The elections scheduled for March were then called off.

== Sunday, February 15, 1931 ==
- Hungary swept the fifth World Table Tennis Championships.
- Died:
  - Lillian Leitzel (Leopoldina Pelikan), 39, German-born U.S. acrobat and circus performer, died two days after falling while performing at a circus in Copenhagen;
  - Louis Mann, 65, American stage actor

== Monday, February 16, 1931 ==
- The sinking of a ship in China's Pearl River, south of Guangzhou, killed 100 people. The steamer was carrying 500 people when it hit a rock and sank.
- In the Rijksmuseum in Amsterdam, a mentally disturbed man attacked the 1656 Rembrandt painting The Anatomy Lesson of Dr. Deijman, slashing it five times with an axe.
- Born: Ken Takakura (stage name for Goichi Oda), Japanese film actor; in Nakama, Fukuoka (d. 2014)
- Died: Wilhelm von Gloeden, 74, German photographer

== Tuesday, February 17, 1931 ==
- The Mahatma Gandhi had a four-hour conference with the Viceroy of India Lord Irwin.

== Wednesday, February 18, 1931 ==
- Spanish Navy Admiral Juan Bautista Aznar-Cabañas took over as Prime Minister of Spain.
- Born:
  - Johnny Hart, U.S. cartoonist known for the comic strips B.C. and The Wizard of Id; in Endicott, New York (d. 2007)
  - Toni Morrison, American novelist, editor and Nobel Prize in Literature laureate; as Chloe Wolford, in Lorain, Ohio (d. 2019)
  - Margarete Müller, German politician, in Neustadt, Upper Silesia, Weimar Republic (d. 2024)
  - Bob St. Clair, American football player and NFL tackle; in Santa Rosa, California (d. 2015)
- Died: Louis Wolheim, 50, American stage and film actor, from stomach cancer

== Thursday, February 19, 1931 ==
- The Socialist Soviet Republic of Abkhazia was dissolved and reformed as the Abkhaz Autonomous Soviet Socialist Republic, an autonomous republic of Soviet Georgia, resulting in public protests.
- The German musical film The Threepenny Opera, based on the play of the same name by Bertolt Brecht and Kurt Weill, premiered in Berlin.

== Friday, February 20, 1931 ==
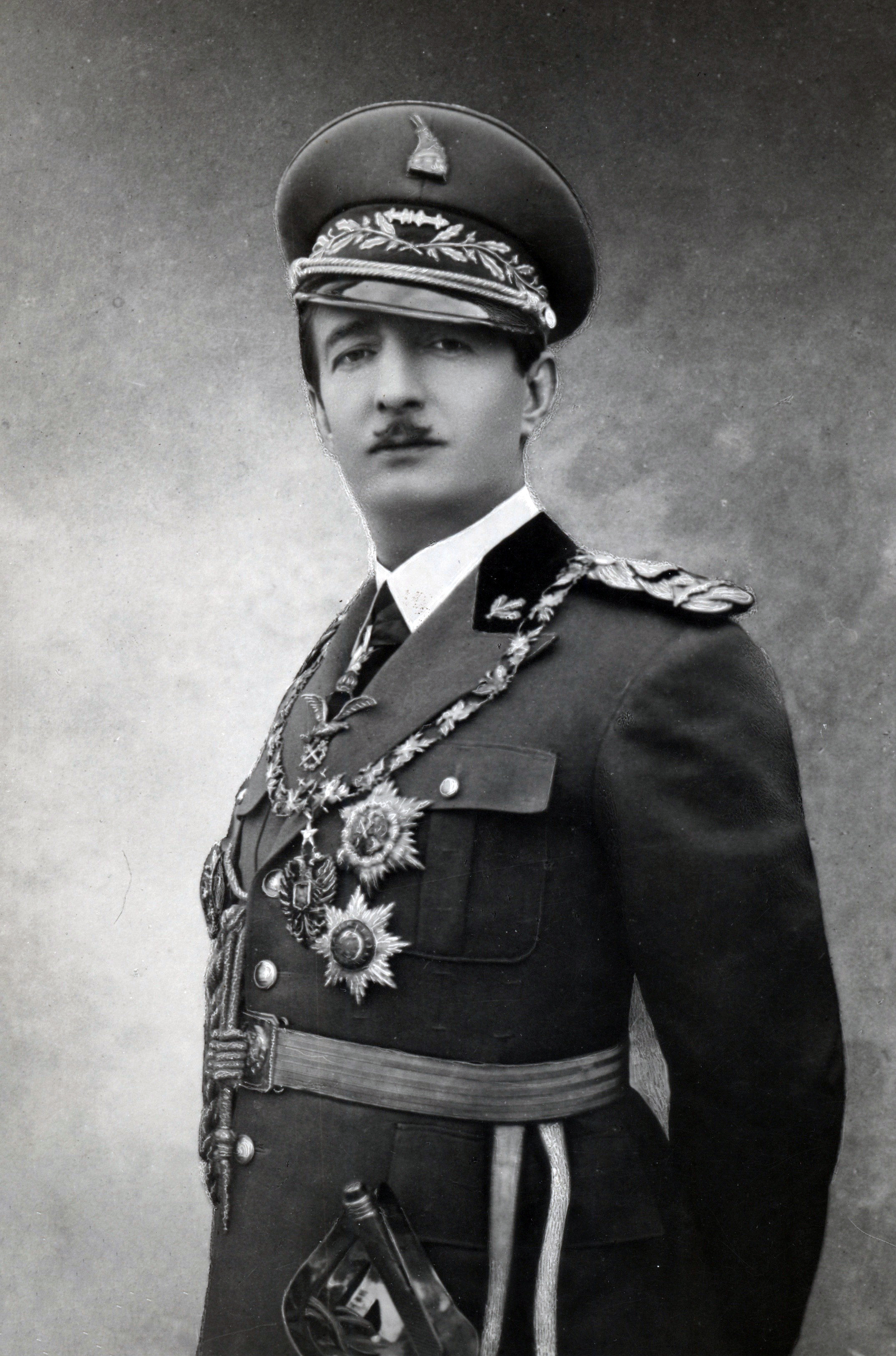
King Zog of Albania

- King Zog I of Albania survived an assassination attempt as he was leaving the Vienna State Opera building. Two Albanian students opened fire as members of the royal entourage emerged from the building, killing one of Zog's bodyguards and injuring two others. However, the king left through a different exit and was unharmed.

== Saturday, February 21, 1931 ==
- A hurricane in the Fiji Islands killed 230 people.
- A coal mine explosion in Eschweiler in Germany killed 31 people.
- The Soviet Union revoked the citizenship of Leon Trotsky.

== Sunday, February 22, 1931 ==
- An estimated 40,000 German republicans demonstrated in the Berlin Lustgarten in favour of the republic and against antidemocratic parties. At the same time, 5,000 members of the Reichsbanner Schwarz-Rot-Gold marched in uniform. Isolated clashes were reported in other German cities where similar demonstrations took place.

== Monday, February 23, 1931 ==
- The Sicilian capital of Palermo was flooded by torrential rains.
- A pipe bomb exploded inside a vent in the Cuban presidential palace, but no one was hurt.
- Died: Dame Nellie Melba (stage name for Helen Porter Mitchell), 69, Australian operatic soprano

== Tuesday, February 24, 1931 ==
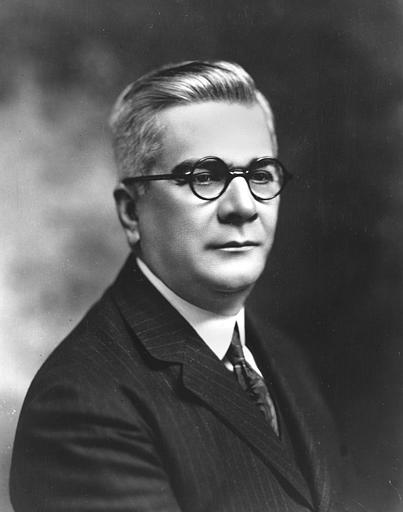
President Machado of Cuba

- Cuban President Gerardo Machado survived the second attempt on his life within 24 hours when police seized a youth who attempted to draw a pistol while Machado was making a speech dedicating the new capitol.
- Norwegian ski jumper Sigmund Ruud set a new world record with a jump of 81 meters.
- The U.S. Supreme Court decided United States v. Sprague, upholding the validity of the ratification of the 18th Amendment to the U.S. Constitution and the prohibition against the sale of alcohol in the United States.
- Born: Brian Close, English cricketer and the youngest man to play Test cricket for the England national team; in Rawdon, West Yorkshire (d. 2015)

== Wednesday, February 25, 1931 ==
- "World Unemployment Day" marches were held in Germany, organized by the Communist Party. Four were killed and many injured in clashes with police.
- Born: Eric Edgar Cooke, Australian serial killer; in Perth, Western Australia (executed by hanging, 1964)

== Thursday, February 26, 1931 ==
- The Philadelphia Club was raided for alcohol by the Philadelphia Police Department.
- The Alfred Hitchcock-directed film The Skin Game was released in the United Kingdom.
- Born: Robert Novak, U.S. journalist, political commentator and syndicated columnist; in Joliet, Illinois (d. 2009)
- Died:
  - Otto Wallach, 83, German chemist and 1910 Nobel laureate for his research of alicyclic compounds
  - Samuel Hill, 73, American businessman and railroad executive

== Friday, February 27, 1931 ==
- Al Capone was sentenced in Chicago to six months in prison for contempt of court. He was released on bond pending appeal.
- The New York World family of newspapers were sold to the Scripps-Howard syndicate for $5 million. The World ceased publication and was merged with the New York Telegram to form the New York World-Telegram.
- The Canadian government banned the importation of Soviet goods, explaining that they did not want to economically strengthen communism. The Soviet Union banned Canadian goods in reprisal.

== Saturday, February 28, 1931 ==
- Sir Oswald Mosley resigned from the Labour Party and immediately announced the formation of a new political organization known as the New Party. "We differ from the old parties in our demand for a complete revision of parliament which will change it from a talk shop into a workshop", Mosley explained in a statement. "We challenge the 50-year-old system of free trade which exposes industry in the home market to the chaos of world conditions, such as price fluctuations, dumping and competition of sweated labor, which result in the lowering of wages and industrial decay."
- Born:
  - Dean Smith, U.S. college basketball coach who won 879 games for the University of North Carolina and two NCAA championships; in Emporia, Kansas (d. 2015)
  - Gavin MacLeod (stage name for Allan George See), American TV and film actor known for The Love Boat and The Mary Tyler Moore Show; in Mount Kisco, New York (d. 2021)
- Died: Rear Admiral Thomas S. Rodgers, 72, U.S. Navy officer
