= 24 Hours (1931 film) =

1931 film

- Spanish poster
- Directed by: Marion Gering
- Written by: Louis Weitzenkorn
- Based on: Twenty-four Hours, a novel by Louis Bromfield and the play Shattered Glass by Will D. Lengle and Lew Levenson
- Starring: Clive Brook; Kay Francis; Miriam Hopkins; Regis Toomey
- Production company: Paramount-Publix Corporation
- Distributed by: Paramount-Publix Corporation
- Release date: October 10, 1931
- Running time: 65-68 minutes
- Country: United States
- Language: English

24 Hours is a 1931 American pre-Code romantic drama film directed by Marion Gering and starring Clive Brook, Kay Francis, Miriam Hopkins and Regis Toomey. It was based on the novel Twenty-Four Hours by Louis Bromfield and the play Shattered Glass by Will D. Lengle and Lew Levenson. In the film, an alcoholic married man is accused of murdering the woman with whom he has been carrying on an affair. The title comes from the fact that the film takes place from 11 pm one night to the same time the following night.

== Plot ==
At an evening party in New York City, the Towners mourn their failing marriage, then leave separately. The somewhat drunk Jim walks to a bar for some more liquor. Before he arrives, a man is shot to death outside the establishment; those inside hastily carry the body inside and surmise that someone named Tony is responsible. Meanwhile, Fanny is driven home by her lover, David Melbourn. On the way, she breaks up with him, telling him she realizes now that she still loves Jim. However, she plans to leave her husband, thinking she is not good enough for him.

Jim next heads to a nightclub to see his lover, star singer Rosie Duggan. He asks her if it is possible for a man to love two women, then remarks that the snow was red outside the bar. After he leaves, her ex-con husband Tony Bruzzi shows up. He wants her to take him back, but she has him thrown out, though she keeps his gun; she guesses from the red snow that Tony killed someone.

Later, she takes Jim home. He falls asleep on her chaise longue. Then Tony shows up, jealous and determined to kill Jim. She tells him that Jim is not there, but he does not believe her. When she refuses to open a locked door, they struggle and he kills her.

The next morning, Jim wakes up and finds Rosie's body. Meanwhile, Tony hides out at Mrs. Dacklehorst's place, but he is tracked down by Dave the Slapper and his gang; the man Tony shot was part of Dave's mob. Tony demands Mrs. Dacklehorst deliver or mail a letter to his gang, but she betrays him instead, and he is shot dead.

Jim is charged with Rosie's murder. When Fanny shows up at the police station, Jim tells her to divorce him so she will not get entangled in his troubles, but she refuses to do so. Fortunately, fingerprints on a liquor bottle at Rosie's place match Tony's, and Jim is released. The couple reconcile, and Jim promises to stop drinking.

== Cast ==
- Clive Brook as Jim Towner
- Kay Francis as Fanny Towner
- Miriam Hopkins as Rosie Duggan
- Regis Toomey as Tony "Sicily" Bruzzi
- George Barbier as Hector Champion
- Adrienne Ames as Ruby Wintringham
- Minor Watson as David Melbourn
- Lucille La Verne as Mrs. Dacklehorst
- Wade Boteler as Pat Healy, a doorman, Rosie's brother
- Bob Kortman (uncredited) as Dave the Slapper
- Malcolm Waite (uncredited) as Murphy

== See also ==
- The House That Shadows Built (1931 promotional film by Paramount)
