= November 1930 =

Month of 1930

<<	November 1930					>>
Su	Mo	Tu	We	Th	Fr	Sa
						1
2	3	4	5	6	7	8
9	10	11	12	13	14	15
16	17	18	19	20	21	22
23	24	25	26	27	28	29
30

The following events occurred in November 1930:

== Saturday, November 1, 1930 ==
- The Detroit–Windsor Tunnel opened.
- The Liberal Party won mid-term parliamentary elections in Cuba.
- Born: A. R. Gurney, playwright and novelist, in Buffalo, New York (d. 2017)

== Sunday, November 2, 1930 ==
- Ras Tafari Makonnen Woldemikael was crowned Emperor Haile Selassie in Ethiopia.

== Monday, November 3, 1930 ==
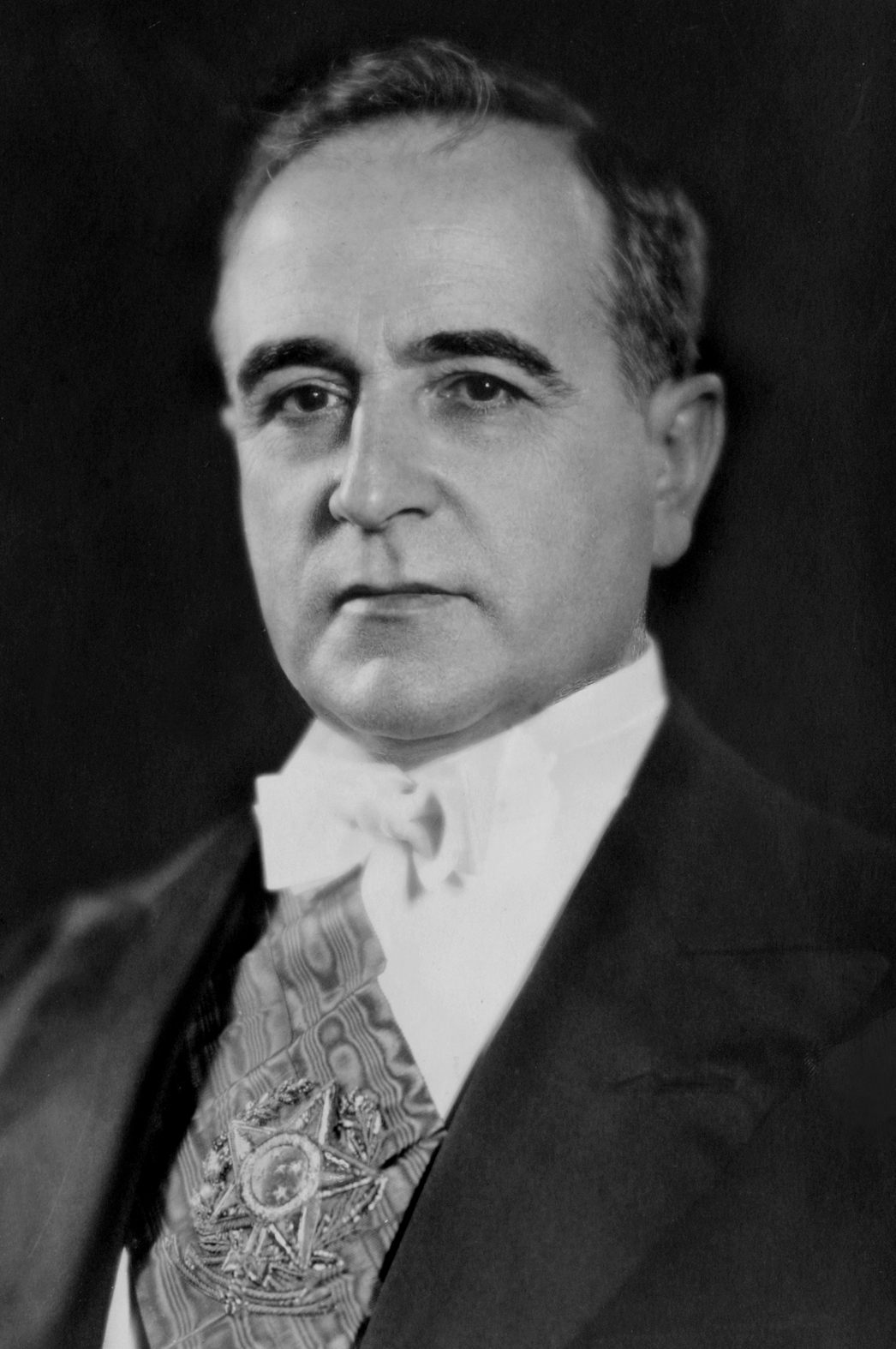
President Vargas

- Getúlio Vargas became President of Brazil.
- The Maxwell Anderson play Elizabeth the Queen premiered at the Guild Theatre on Broadway.
- Born: D. James Kennedy, evangelist, in Augusta, Georgia (d. 2007)

== Tuesday, November 4, 1930 ==
- President Herbert Hoover and the Republicans suffered substantial losses in the U.S. midterm elections. The Republicans, who had held a 270 to 164 majority in 1928, retained only a slim majority of 218 to 216 in the House of Representatives, and their control of the U.S. Senate dropped from a 56-39 majority in 1928 to a 48 to 47 lead.
- Born: Dick Groat, U.S. baseball player; in Wilkinsburg, Pennsylvania (d. 2023)

== Wednesday, November 5, 1930 ==
- Eighty-two coal miners were killed in the Millfield Mine disaster in Ohio.
- The Wittpenn Bridge opened in New Jersey.
- The 3rd Academy Awards were awarded in a ceremony in the Ambassador Hotel in London, only 10 months after the 2nd Academy Awards had been distributed on April 3. All Quiet on the Western Front won the top award for Outstanding Production.
- Died:
  - Christiaan Eijkman, 72, Dutch physician and Nobel laureate
  - Luigi Facta, 68, former Prime Minister of Italy

== Thursday, November 6, 1930 ==
- Nine members of United Artists released a joint statement attacking Fox West Coast Theatres as "an arrogant monopoly" that was fixing low prices to pay to show films, and announcing they would boycott the chain until they changed their policies. Charlie Chaplin, Mary Pickford, Douglas Fairbanks and Al Jolson were among the signees. Fox issued a reply saying their prices were competitive with other west coast theaters and explaining, "Inasmuch as United Artists produce only a small percentage of the films shown in Fox theaters, we are not greatly concerned with their threat to withdraw all their efforts."
- Born:
  - Derrick Bell, African-American law professor and one of the originators of critical race theory; in Pittsburgh (d. 2011)
  - Wilma Briggs, AAGPBL baseball player who had the league's second highest number of career home runs; in East Greenwich, Rhode Island (d. 2023)

== Friday, November 7, 1930 ==
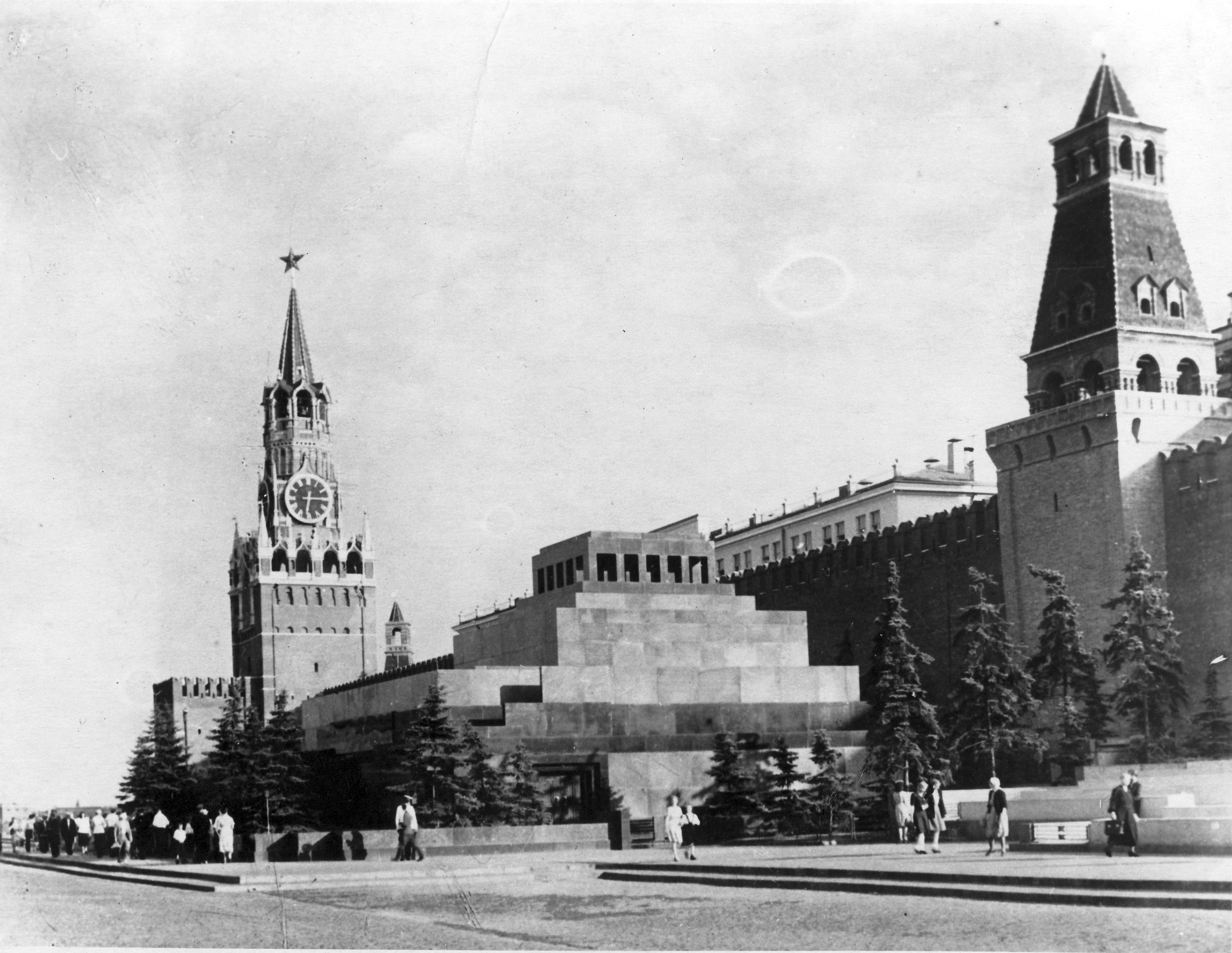
Lenin's tomb

- Lenin's Mausoleum reopened as a new, permanent structure on the thirteenth anniversary of the Communist Revolution.
- The Bank of Tennessee failed and went into federal receivership, triggering a chain reaction of bank closures in and around the American South over the next two weeks as more and more people made bank runs.

== Saturday, November 8, 1930 ==
- The United States and Britain extended formal recognition to the new Brazilian government.
- Died: Clare Eames, 36, American stage actress, director and wife of Sidney Howard; from complications following emergency surgery in Britain

== Sunday, November 9, 1930 ==
- The Social Democratic Party won the Austrian legislative election. Neither the Communists nor the Nazis were able to win a single seat.
- Died: Gilbert Genesta (born Royden Joseph Gilbert Raison DelaGenesta), 52, American escape artist and magician; drowned during escape act

== Monday, November 10, 1930 ==
- Over 30 people were injured in London when four elephants stampeded during the Lord Mayor's Show.
- Born: Gene Conley, baseball and basketball player, in Muskogee, Oklahoma (d. 2017)
- Died: William Light, 52, English cricketer

== Tuesday, November 11, 1930 ==
- The government of Belgium's Prime Minister Henri Jaspar resigned over the dispute concerning the use of the Flemish and French languages at Ghent University.
- Born: Mildred Dresselhaus (née Spiewak), American solid-state physicist and electrical engineer, pioneer in nanotechnology; in Brooklyn (d. 2017)
- Died: Caleb R. Layton, 79, American physician and former U.S. Congressman for Delaware who was voted out of office for opposing anti-lynching legislation.

== Wednesday, November 12, 1930 ==
- The first Round Table Conference between the British government and representatives of the Indian independence movement opened in London.
- Born:
  - Alberta Odell Jones. The first female prosecutor in the U.S. state of Kentucky; in Louisville (murdered 1965)
  - Bob Crewe, singer, songwriter and record producer, in Newark, New Jersey (d. 2014)

== Thursday, November 13, 1930 ==
- Cuban President Gerardo Machado suspended the Constitution for 25 days as rioting in Havana killed 7.
- The German football club SV Wacker Burghausen was founded.

== Friday, November 14, 1930 ==
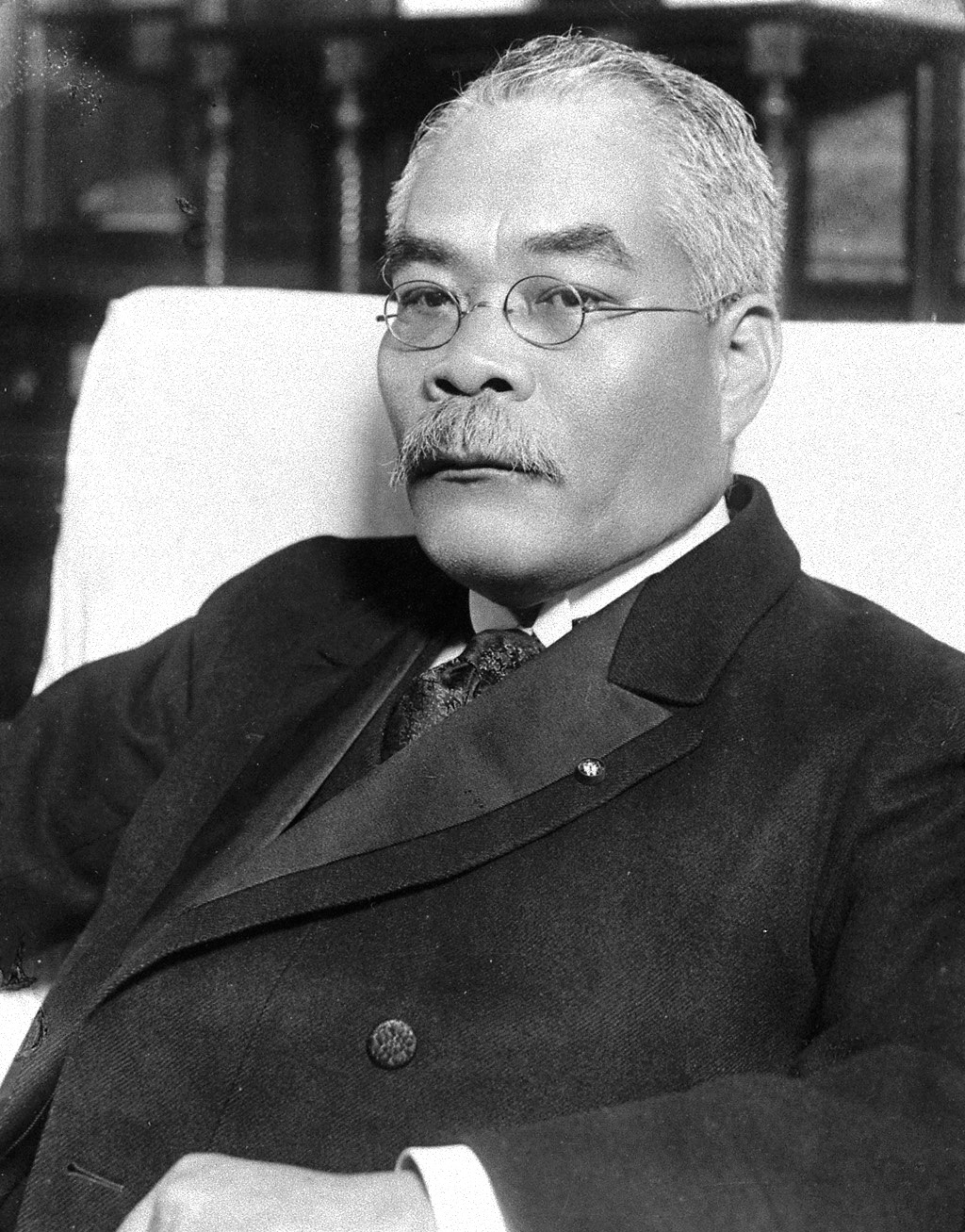
Hamaguchi

- Japanese Prime Minister Osachi Hamaguchi was shot and seriously wounded in an assassination attempt at Tokyo Station. His wounds were ultimately fatal, and he died of sepsis on August 26, 1931.
- Tony Canzoneri knocked out Al Singer in the first round at Madison Square Garden to win the World Lightweight Title in a stunning upset.
- The Imperial Conference ended without an agreement on measures to encourage trade within the Empire.
- Born:
  - Ed White, U.S. astronaut, in San Antonio, Texas (killed in Apollo 1 fire, 1967)
  - Shirley Crabtree, English professional wrestler, in Halifax, West Yorkshire (d. 1997)

== Saturday, November 15, 1930 ==
- A 48-hour general strike began in Madrid protesting police methods in handling demonstrating workmen. Rioters smashed street lights and streetcars while battling police.
- Born: J. G. Ballard, English author and essayist, in Shanghai International Settlement, China (d. 2009)

== Sunday, November 16, 1930 ==
- Parliamentary elections were held in Poland. The Nonpartisan Bloc for Cooperation with the Government, affiliated with Józef Piłsudski, won an absolute majority, capturing 249 of the 444 seats in the Sejm. Opposition parties were systematically suppressed during the election campaign through arrests and intimidation.
- The Parliament of Iraq ratified the Anglo-Iraqi Treaty confirming Iraqi independence and providing for Iraq's admission into the League of Nations in 1932.
- Born:
  - Chinua Achebe, Nigerian novelist, poet, professor and critic; in Ogidi, Anambra (d. 2013)
  - Salvatore Riina, Sicilian Mafia boss, in Corleone (d. 2017)

== Monday, November 17, 1930 ==
- In Spain, 200,000 workers and students joined the Madrid general strike. Workers in the city of Barcelona also went on strike in sympathy.
- College football star Joe Savoldi withdrew from the University of Notre Dame after a scandal broke revealing that he had filed for annulment of a secret marriage.
- The Billy Rose-produced musical revue Sweet and Low opened at Chanin's 46th Street Theatre on Broadway.

== Tuesday, November 18, 1930 ==
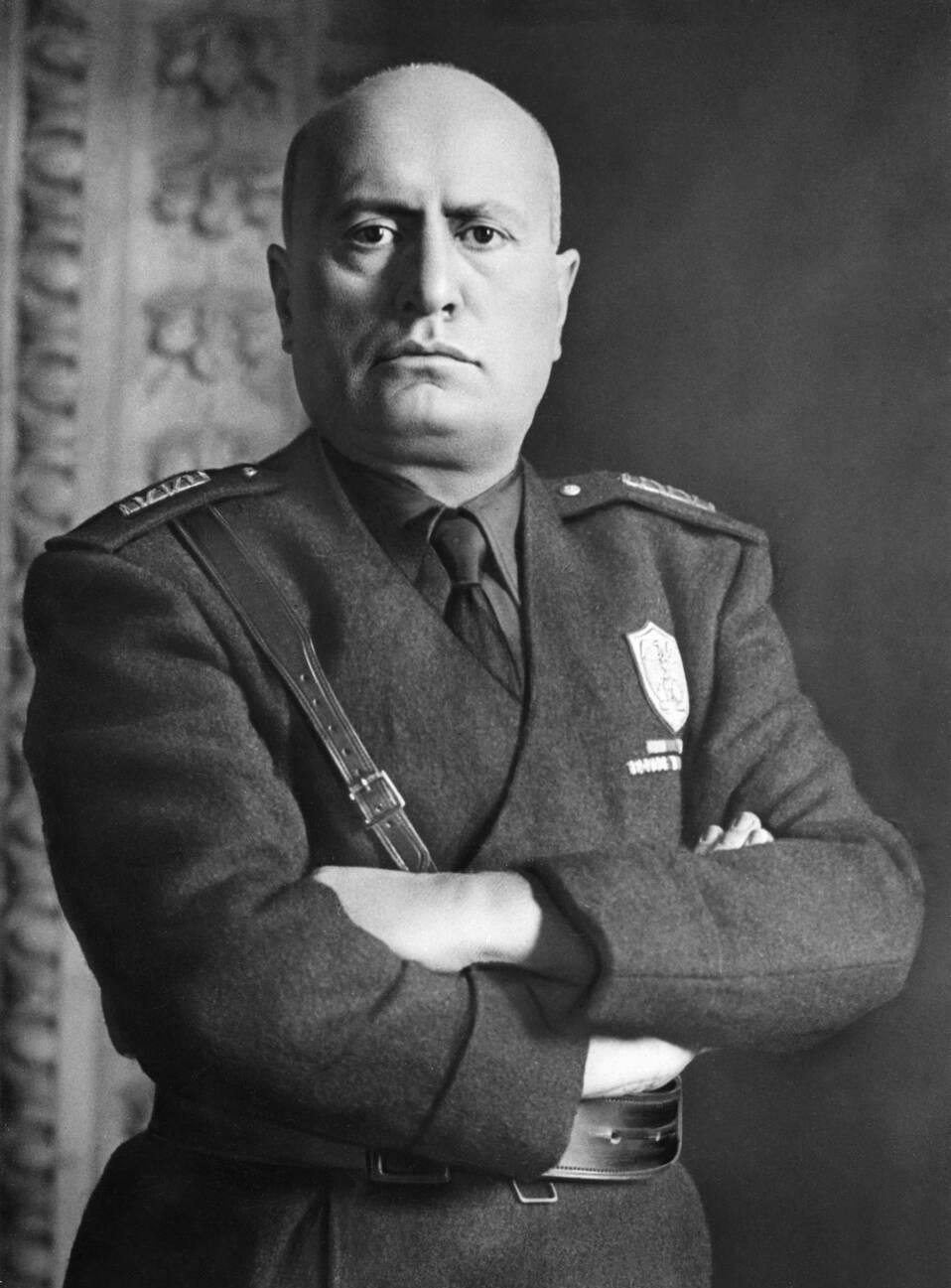
Mussolini

- Fascist Italy reduced the salary of nearly a million government employees by 12%, and in some cases up to 35%, to make up the government's budget deficit. All cabinet ministers, including Mussolini himself, took a 12% pay cut.
- Sténio Vincent was elected President of Haiti by the National Assembly.

== Wednesday, November 19, 1930 ==
- Al Capone associate Jake Guzik was found guilty on three counts of tax evasion.
- The general strike in Barcelona was called off after three days of rioting. Strikes had spread to ten other Spanish cities since the first one was called in Madrid.

== Thursday, November 20, 1930 ==
- German Foreign Minister Julius Curtius said in a speech that Germany may have to ask for a moratorium on its Young Plan payments.
- Born: Bernard Horsfall, English actor, in Bishop's Stortford (d. 2013)
- Died: William B. Hanna, 64, American sportswriter

== Friday, November 21, 1930 ==
- Douglas MacArthur was sworn in as Chief of Staff of the United States Army.

== Saturday, November 22, 1930 ==
- In his first interview ever given to a Western news agency, Soviet leader Joseph Stalin spoke to United Press International to refute rumors he had been assassinated.

== Sunday, November 23, 1930 ==
- Storms lashed Western and Central Europe, causing flooding and shipping disruptions, and killing 12 people.
- The German cargo ship Louise Leonhardt sank in the North Sea storm with the loss of all 31 crew.
- Born: Jack McKeon, baseball manager, in South Amboy, New Jersey

== Monday, November 24, 1930 ==
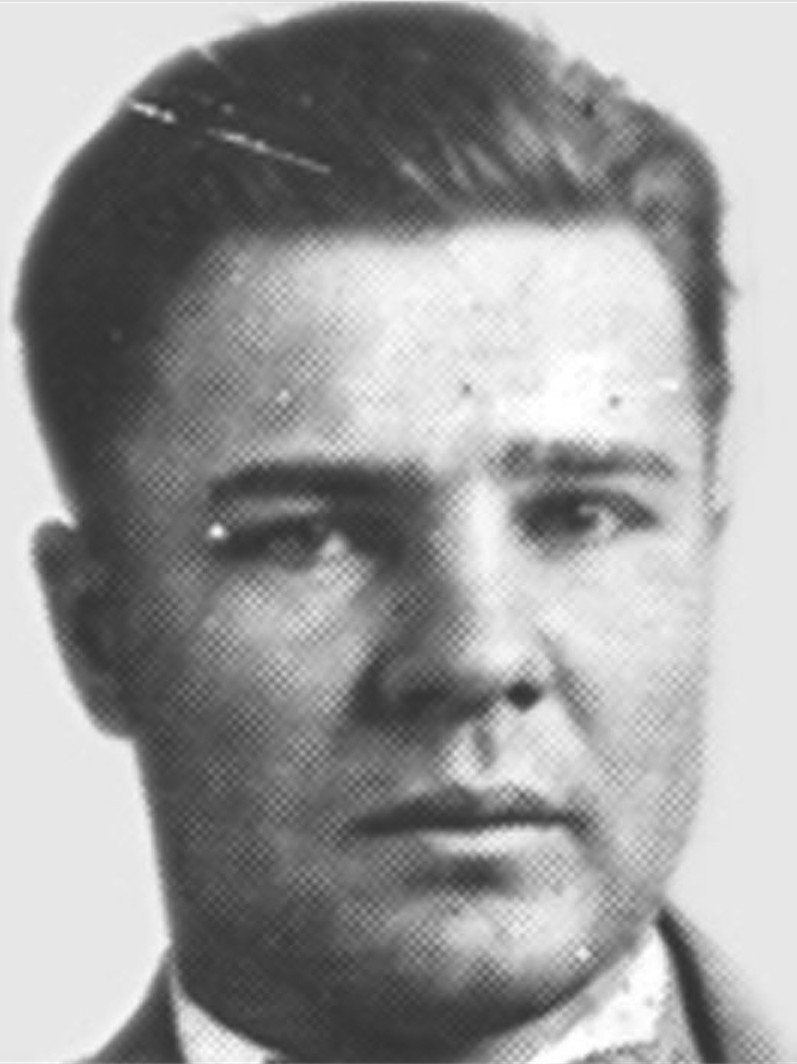
Floyd

- Pretty Boy Floyd and an accomplice were sentenced to at least 12 years in prison for robbing a bank in Sylvania, Ohio. Floyd almost escaped an hour before his sentencing by slipping out a side door of the county jail, but police managed to catch him after a short chase.
- Born: Bob Friend, U.S. baseball player and pitcher who had the best ERA in the National League in 1955, despite, pitching for the last place Pittsburgh Pirates; in Lafayette, Indiana (d. 2019)

== Tuesday, November 25, 1930 ==
- The 7.1 magnitude North Izu earthquake shook Japan, killing 259 people.
- The Industrial Party Trial began in the Soviet Union. Several prominent scientists and economists were accused of plotting against the government.
- Born: Clark Scholes, Olympic swimmer, in Detroit (d. 2010)

== Wednesday, November 26, 1930 ==
- Berlin police arrested 200 students publicly defying the government ban on duelling. A great number of rapiers and sabres were also seized.
- Died: Otto Sverdrup, 76, Norwegian sailor and explorer

== Thursday, November 27, 1930 ==
- Johann Heinrich von Bernstorff demanded military parity between Germany and the Allies at the League of Nations preparatory disarmament conference in Geneva, but the commission rejected the request and said the Treaty of Versailles must stand.
- Born: Rex Shelley, Singaporean author; in Singapore (d. 2009)
- Died: Velimir Vukićević, 59, Serbian politician, Prime Minister of Yugoslavia 1927 to 1928

== Friday, November 28, 1930 ==
- An international conference in Geneva meeting to discuss the worldwide economic depression adjourned after ten days.
- The musical film The Lottery Bride premiered at the Rialto Theatre in New York City.
- Died: Constantine VI of Constantinople, 71, former Ecumenical Patriarch of Constantinople

== Saturday, November 29, 1930 ==
- St Helens Recs defeated Wigan Warriors 18–3 to win rugby's Lancashire Cup.
- Carl Vaugoin resigned as Chancellor of Austria following the Christian Social Party's defeat in the November 9 elections.
- The surrealist film L'Age d'Or (The Golden Age) directed by Luis Buñuel and co-written with Salvador Dalí premiered in Paris.

== Sunday, November 30, 1930 ==
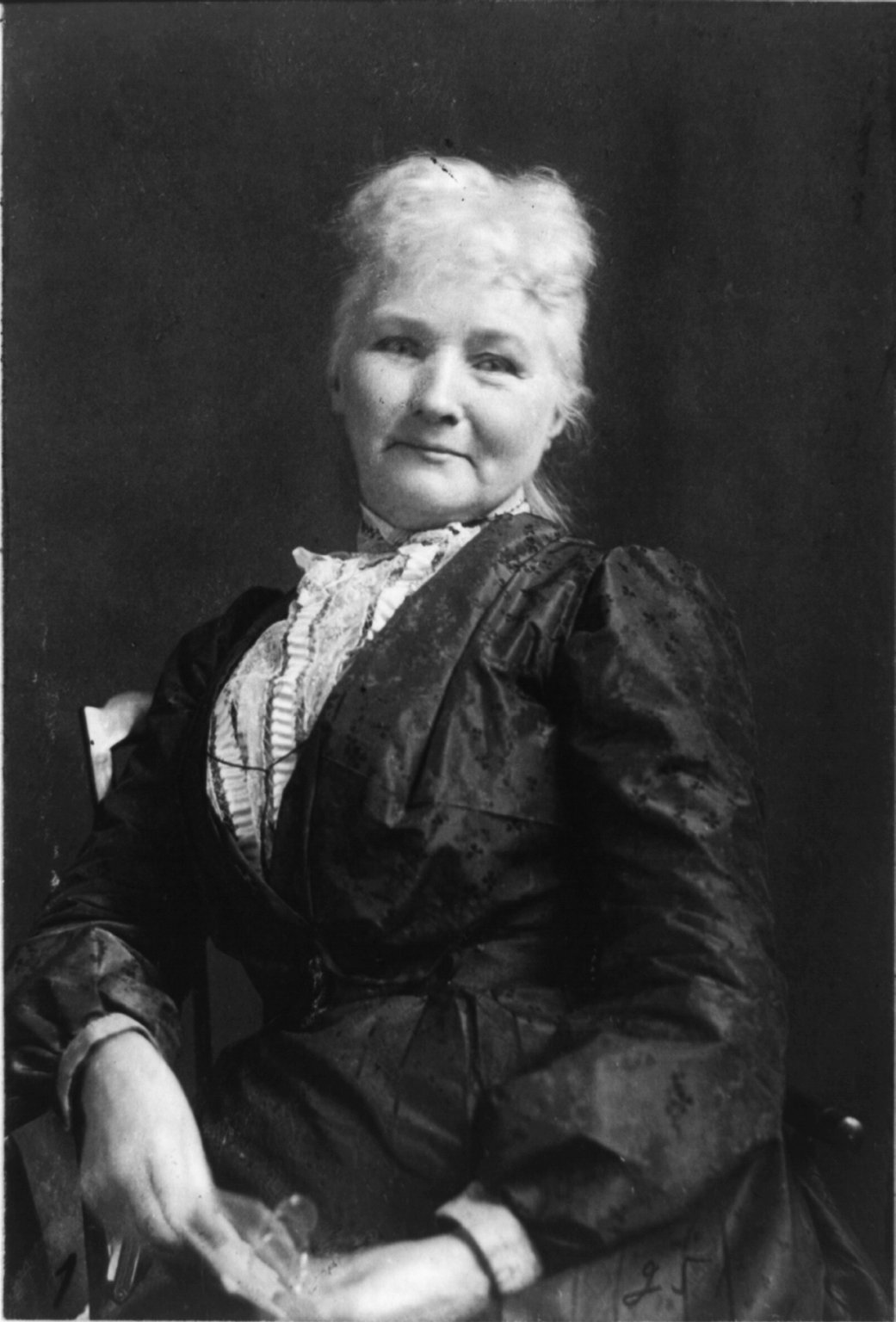
Mother Jones

- The Nazis won 32 of 120 seats in the Bremen state elections, making them the second-largest party in that German state's legislature, behind the Social Democratic Party, which won 40 seats.
- Born: G. Gordon Liddy, lawyer, Watergate scandal figure and political commentator, in Brooklyn (d. 2021)
- Died: Mary Harris "Mother" Jones, 93, American labor leader
