= Two Against the World (1936 film) =

1936 film by William C. McGann

- Directed by: William C. McGann
- Written by: Michael Jacoby (credited as Michel Jacoby)
- Based on: Five Star Final by Louis Weitzenkorn
- Starring: Humphrey Bogart; Beverly Roberts; Linda Perry
- Cinematography: Sidney Hickox
- Music by: Bernhard Kaun
- Production company: Warner Bros. Pictures
- Distributed by: Warner Bros. Pictures; The Vitaphone Corporation
- Release date: July 11, 1936
- Running time: 64 minutes
- Country: United States
- Language: English

Two Against the World, also known as One Fatal Hour, is a 1936 American melodrama film directed by William C. McGann and starring Humphrey Bogart, Beverly Roberts and Linda Perry. The film is based on the 1930 play Five Star Final by Louis Weitzenkorn and is a much shorter remake of the film Five Star Final, which stars Edward G. Robinson. The main setting has been moved from a newspaper to a nationwide radio network whose owner, Bertram Reynolds, hungry for larger audiences, decides "in the name of public good" to revive the memory of a twenty-year-old murder case, with tragic consequences. The cynical manager of programming, Sherry Scott (Humphrey Bogart), has a crisis of conscience when faced with the deadly results.

== Plot ==
United Broadcasting Company owner Bertram C. Reynolds, abetted by his marketing manager, Mr. Banning, decides to sacrifice quality for more profitable sensationalism by broadcasting a serial based on the twenty-year-old "Gloria Pembrook murder case." Sherry Scott, cynical manager of programming for the radio network, promises Reynolds "the hottest play you ever heard," giving the assignment to a team that includes Dr. Leavenworth, a devious reporter with the manner of a clergyman. When Scott asks his secretary, Alma Ross, her opinion of the project, she replies, "I think you can always get people interested in the crucifixion of a woman."

Not long after a jury found that she was justified in shooting her first husband, Gloria Pembroke had a daughter, Edith, and remarried. She is now Martha Carstairs. Edith, who knows nothing, is about to marry Malcom "Mal" Sims Jr., scion of a socially prominent family. UBC announces the forthcoming series on Gloria Pembroke, alerting Martha and her devoted husband, Jim. Isolated from family and friends since their marriage, the Carstairs desperately seek help, while the young people remain blissfully ignorant. The Carstairs mistake Leavenworth for a pastor's associate and unburden themselves. Moments after he leaves their apartment, they are horrified to hear the radio advertising "Sin Doesn't Pay by Dr. Martin Leavenworth."

Scott welcomes Leavenworth's report, and when Ross challenges him, he retorts that now he only cares about financial security. The Sims hear Leavenworth's morning broadcast and cancel the wedding without speaking to Mal. Martha calls UBC and appeals to Reynolds, but he hangs up on her. In despair, she drinks poison.

Carstairs finds an ally in Dr. McGuire, their pastor, whose appeal to the Association of Broadcasters leads the chairman to promise immediate action. The Federal Communications Commission (FCC) can put Reynolds and his kind out of business. When Jim returns home, he finds his wife's body. He sends Edith and Mal to the church, promising to follow with Martha, but kills himself instead. Later, Mal's parents browbeat Edith about ending the engagement; Mal comes in and defies them.

Reynolds wants to cancel the series and flee to England, but Banning says it is too profitable to cancel. Scott raises the specter of an FCC investigation of Reynold's muckraking. Leavenworth suggests giving Edith money, and they admit her to the office. Edith demands of each of the four men, "Why did you kill my mother?" Scott answers, truthfully, "for financial reasons... to sell time on the air." Increasingly distraught, she draws a gun and shoots wildly. Mal bursts in and takes her in his arms. He tells the men that he will kill them if they use his name or his wife's again. Scott quits, taking Ross with him. The phone rings: It is the FCC. He eagerly agrees to testify.

== Cast ==
- Humphrey Bogart as Sherry Scott
- Beverly Roberts as Alma Ross
- Linda Perry as Edith Carstairs
- Carlyle Moore Jr. as Malcolm Sims Jr. (credited as Carlisle Moore Jr.)
- Henry O'Neill as Jim Carstairs, Martha's husband of 20 years
- Helen MacKellar as Martha Carstairs, formerly Gloria Pembroke (credited as Helen McKellar)
- Claire Dodd as Cora Latimer
- Hobart Cavanaugh as Tippy Mantus
- Harry Hayden as Dr. Martin Leavenworth
- Robert Middlemass as Bertram C. Reynolds (credited as Robert Middlemas)
- Clay Clement as Mr. Banning
- Douglas Wood as Malcolm Sims Sr., steel magnate
- Virginia Brissac as Marion Sims, his wife and Mal's mother
- Paula Stone as Miss Symonds
- Robert Gordon as Herman Mills (credited as Bobby Gordon)
- Frank Orth as Tommy, Bartender
- Howard C. Hickman as Dr. Maguire, pastor of the Carstairs' church (credited as Howard Hickman)
- Ferdinand Schumann-Heink as Sound Mixer (credited as Ferdinard Schumann-Heink)

== Production ==
According to AFI.com, the working title was The Voice of Life.

The film is much shorter than the original, running for 64 as opposed to 89 minutes. Although much of the dialogue is identical to that in Five Star Final (1931), that was a pre-code film, which ends with Edward G. Robinson's character telling his boss to “shove it up his—“, throwing the telephone through a glass door on the last word. Character names have been changed. Although the fatal tragedy remains, the promised intervention of the newly formed Federal Communications Commission adds a ray of hope for the future that is not present in Five Star Final.

== Reception ==
The New York Times review compared the film to the original play, noting that it "lacks the sincerity of purpose that distinguished the earlier work ... The principal rôles are in capable hands."
