= January 1931 =

Month of 1931

<<	January 1931					>>
Su	Mo	Tu	We	Th	Fr	Sa
				1	2	3
4	5	6	7	8	9	10
11	12	13	14	15	16	17
18	19	20	21	22	23	24
25	26	27	28	29	30	31

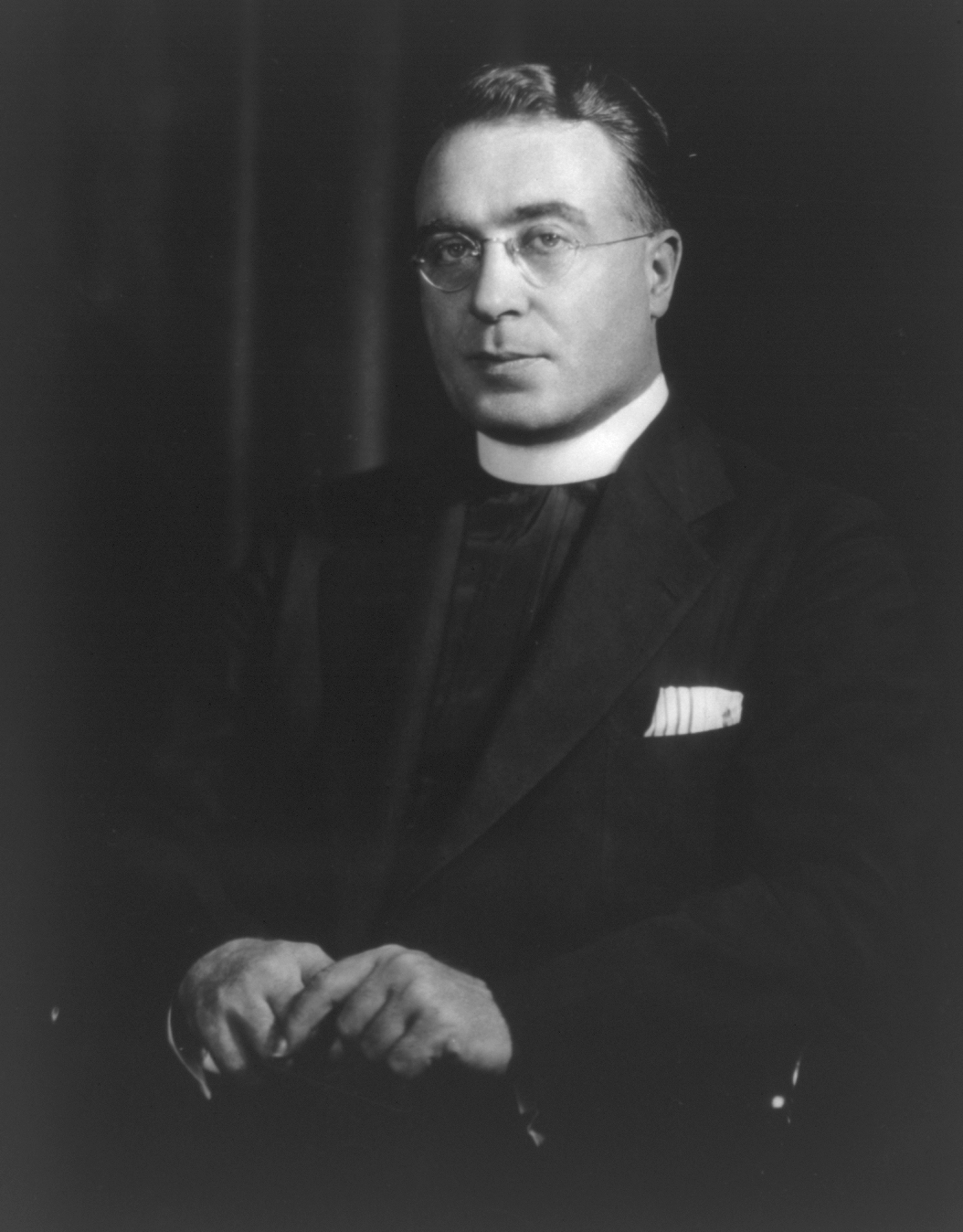
January 4, 1931: CBS Radio ban of Father Charles Coughlin from broadcast attracts 200,000 angry letters

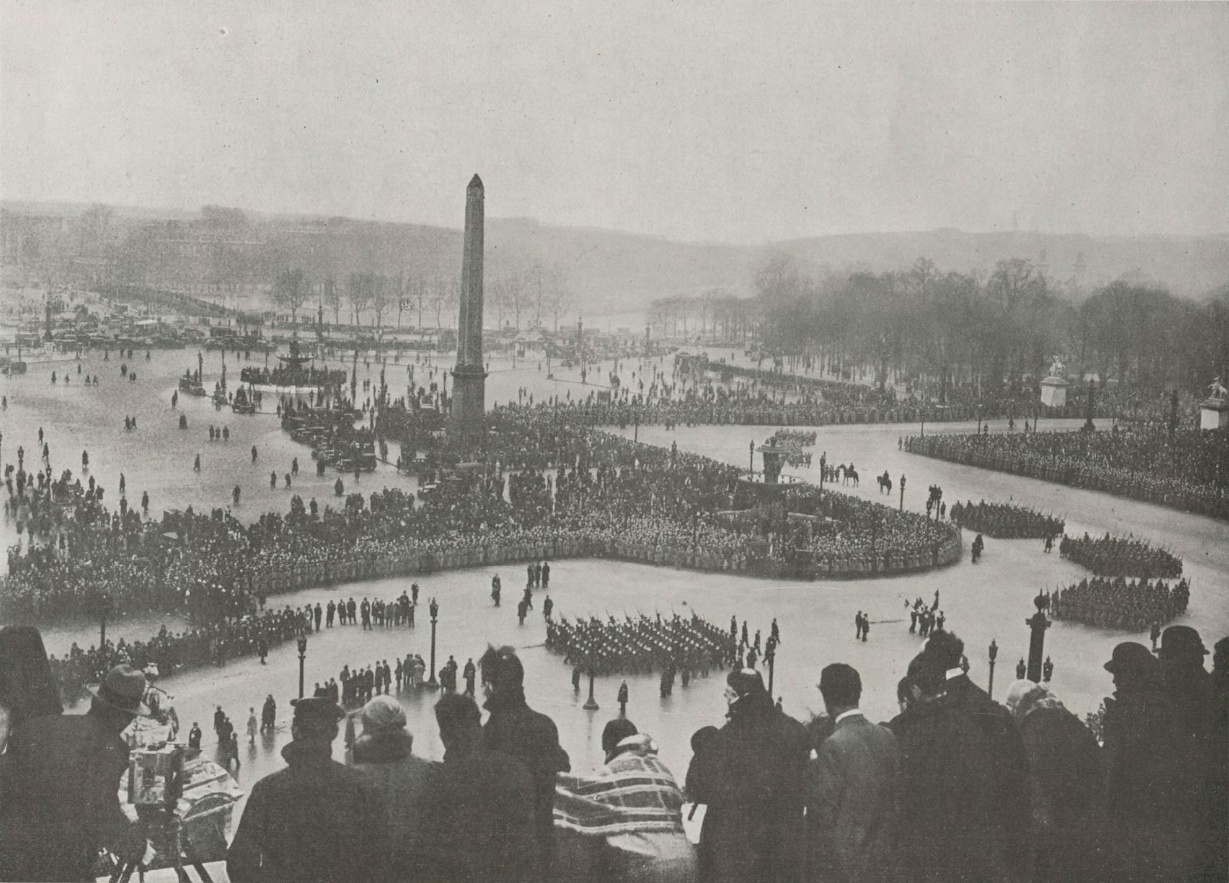
January 7, 1931: Two million French mourners watch funeral procession for Marshal Joseph Joffre in Paris

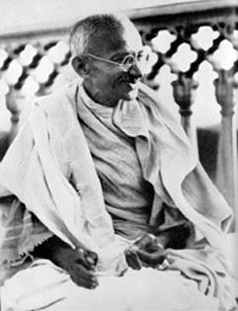
January 26, 1931: Gandhi released from prison by British India government

The following events occurred in January 1931:

== Thursday, January 1, 1931 ==
- The Road Traffic Act came into effect in the United Kingdom and abolished all speed limits on automobiles. With the removal of restrictions on speed, the Act also made driving while intoxicated a criminal offense, along with reckless driving; required vehicle operators to carry liability insurance; and introduced a drivers' licensing test for certain people, specifically those with a disability.
- The Alabama Crimson Tide (9-0-0) and the Washington State Cougars (9-0-0), both unbeaten and untied in American college football, aced each other in Pasadena, California, in the 17th annual Rose Bowl. Alabama won, 24 to 0. Notre Dame, which finished 10-0-0 and defeated unbeaten Northwestern and Army as well as once-beaten USC (which had lost to Washington State), did not compete in a postseason game.
- A group of 150,000 coal miners went on strike in South Wales, following up on the walkout of 75,000 miners in Scotland on December 1.
- The kidnapping of Adolphus Busch Orthwein, the 13-year-old grandson of Anheuser-Busch CEO August Anheuser Busch, Sr., ended after 20 hours. The Busch family said no ransom had been demanded or paid, and that the father of the kidnapper had returned their son to them.
- Italian dictator Benito Mussolini made an English-language radio address to the United States, offering a message of friendship and saying that Italy did not want war. "I should like to contradict many rumors spread abroad on the attitude taken by Fascism and the danger it is supposed to represent for the peace of the world", Mussolini said. "Neither I nor my government nor the Italian people desire to bring about war."
- In a lecture in Cleveland, sociology professor William Fielding Ogburn predicted that the society of the future would eradicate poverty, greatly increase education and control its birth rate based on demand.

== Friday, January 2, 1931 ==
- President of Panama Florencio Harmodio Arosemena was overthrown and imprisoned by a military junta.
- José María Reina Andrade became the acting president of Guatemala.
- Born: Frank Marocco, bestselling American accordion player and composer; in Joliet, Illinois (d. 2012)

== Saturday, January 3, 1931 ==
- Nels Stewart of the Montreal Maroons scored two goals just four seconds apart in a game against the Boston Bruins, the first player to ever accomplish the feat in NHL history.
- The Howard Hawks-directed crime film The Criminal Code, starring Walter Huston, was released.

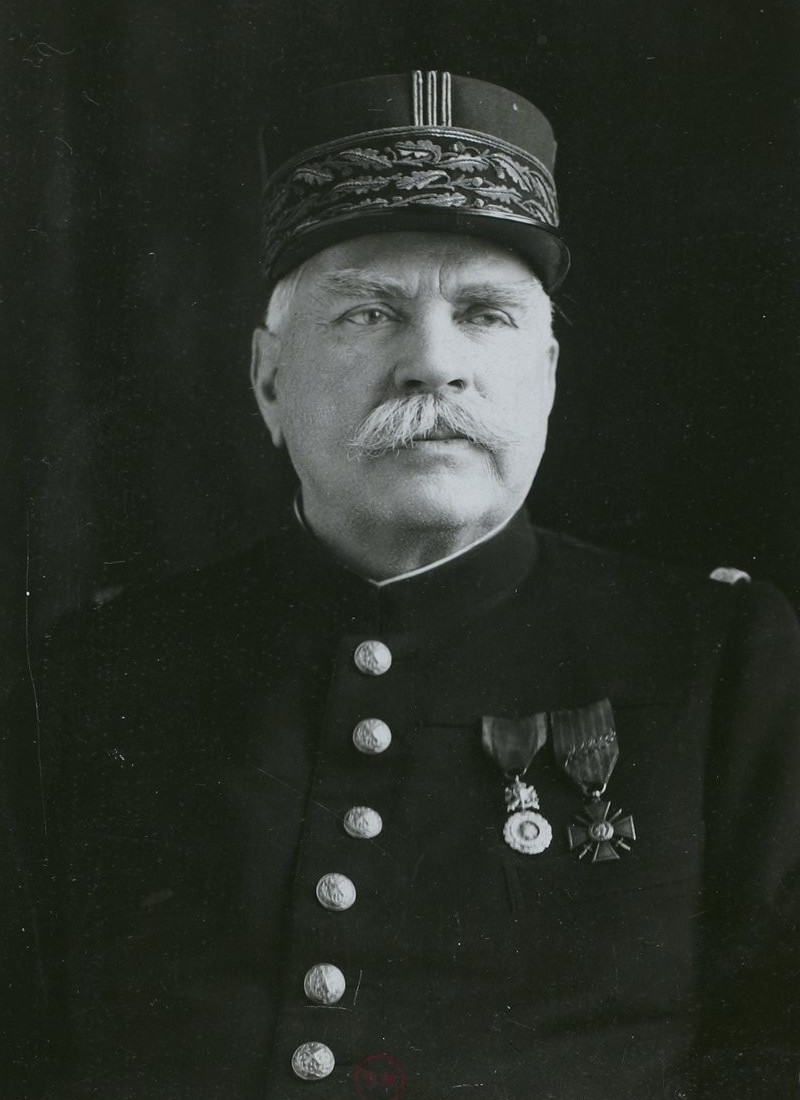
Marshal Joffre

- Died: French Army Marshal Joseph Joffre, 78, hero of the First Battle of the Marne in World War I after regrouping retreating Allied armies.

== Sunday, January 4, 1931 ==
- Father Coughlin's weekly radio sermon was banned from broadcast over CBS. The sermon for the week was titled "Prosperity" and discussed unemployment. The ban came after the network asked Coughlin to moderate his attacks on the Hoover Administration's economic policies.
- Died:
  - Roger Connor, 73, American baseball player whose 138 career home runs had been the major league record for 23 years until he was superseded by Babe Ruth in 1920
  - Princess Louise of the United Kingdom, 63, eldest daughter of the last King Edward VII and younger sister of King George V
  - Art Acord, 40, American silent film star who had been unable to make the transition to sound films, committed suicide by taking poison

== Monday, January 5, 1931 ==
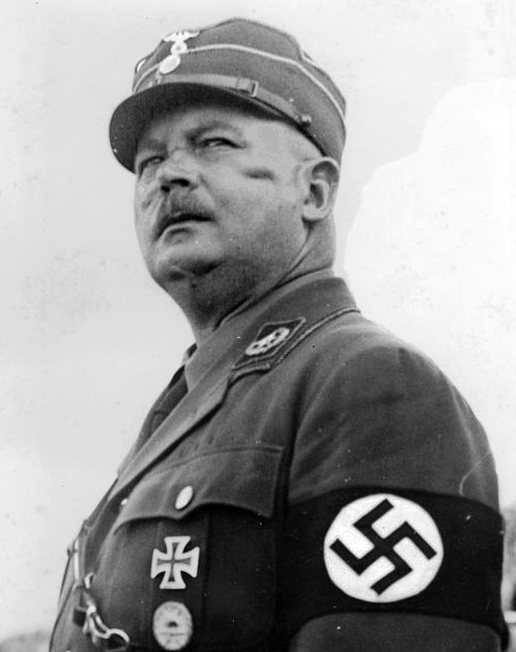
Ernst Röhm

- Adolf Hitler appointed Ernst Röhm as Stabschef (chief of staff) of the Sturmabteilung (SA), also known as the "Storm Troopers".
- The United States Supreme Court decided the case of O'Gorman & Young, Inc. v. Hartford Fire Insurance Co..
- Born:
  - Alvin Ailey, African-American choreographer and activist who founded the Alvin Ailey American Dance Theater; in Rogers, Texas (d. 1989)
  - Robert Duvall, U.S. film and TV actor and filmmaker, 1972 Academy Award winner for The Godfather; in San Diego
  - Alfred Brendel, Austrian classical pianist, in Vizimberk, Czechoslovakia (now Loučná nad Desnou, Czech Republic) (d. 2025)

== Tuesday, January 6, 1931 ==
- U.S. president Herbert Hoover addressed the National Automobile Chamber of Commerce in New York from Washington, saying, "The despondency of some people over the future is not borne out by the statistical evidence of prospects in respect to the automobile industry."
- The Norwegian government granted Leon Trotsky permission to enter the country to give a series of lectures.
- Born: E. L. Doctorow, historical novelist known for Ragtime and other best-selling works, in the Bronx (d. 2015)

== Wednesday, January 7, 1931 ==
- The funeral of French General Joseph Joffre was held at Notre-Dame de Paris cathedral, with an estimated two million people watching the funeral procession. The remains were placed in a vault in Les Invalides where they were to be kept until a mausoleum could be constructed at his estate in Louveciennes.

== Thursday, January 8, 1931 ==
- Lita Grey, the ex-wife of Charlie Chaplin, was kidnapped and robbed along with retired boxer Georges Carpentier as the couple left a theater in New York. After being held at gunpoint by four armed robbers, the two were driven more than a mile and then dumped out. Ms. Grey reported being robbed of $14,000 in jewelry.
- Germany's total of unemployed was estimated at 4.5 million.
- Born: Bill Graham, German-born American concert promoter; as Wulf Wolodia Grajonca in Berlin (killed in helicopter crash, 1991)

== Friday, January 9, 1931 ==
- The Spanish Air Corps was temporarily abolished for one month by King Alfonso XIII as punishment for the failed December 15 revolt. When the month was up the department was to be completely reorganized with less autonomy.
- Died: Jean Schopfer, 62, Swiss-born French tennis player

== Saturday, January 10, 1931 ==
- A three-member arbitration court in Germany cut the wages of 300,000 Ruhr miners by 6 percent.
- Born: Peter Barnes, English playwright and screenwriter, in Bow, London (d. 2004)

== Sunday, January 11, 1931 ==
- Four Catholic priests and nine students were arrested in Lithuania on charges of disseminating anti-government propaganda.
- After a week of negative publicity and an estimated 200,000 angry letters from listeners, CBS relented and allowed Father Coughlin's "Prosperity" sermon to be broadcast.
- Chicago gangster James Belcastro was shot five times by would-be assassins, but survived.
- Died: Nathan Straus, 82, Bavarian-born American department store merchant and philanthropist for whom the Israeli city of Netanya is named

== Monday, January 12, 1931 ==
- Agricultural experts from 26 countries met in Geneva to discuss the world's grain production problem.
- Born: Roland Alphonso, Cuban-born Jamaican saxophonist, in Havana (d. 1998)

== Tuesday, January 13, 1931 ==
- In Szolnok, Hungary, the executions of the convicted Angel Makers of Nagyrév began with the hanging of Marie Kordos.
- The Philip Barry play Tomorrow and Tomorrow opened at Henry Miller's Theatre on Broadway.
- Born:
  - Charles Nelson Reilly, American stage and TV actor, comedian and director, in South Bronx, New York (d. 2007)
  - Rip Taylor, American actor and comedian, in Washington, D.C. (d. 2019)

== Wednesday, January 14, 1931 ==
- Chicago mobster Terry Druggan was sentenced to a year in prison for contempt of court, but his attorneys immediately secured a writ of habeas corpus that got him freed on $5,000 bail.
- Born: Caterina Valente, French-born Italian guitarist, dancer and actress, in Paris (d. 2024)
- Died: Hardy Richardson, 75, American baseball player and 1886 National League home run leader

== Thursday, January 15, 1931 ==
- An earthquake killed 114 people in the southern Mexican state of Oaxaca.
- Eleven Italian seaplanes led by Italo Balbo touched down at Botafogo Bay in Brazil, ending a 6,000-mile (9,700 km) flight from Italy that began on December 17. The pilots were greeted by Brazilian president Getúlio Vargas.

== Friday, January 16, 1931 ==
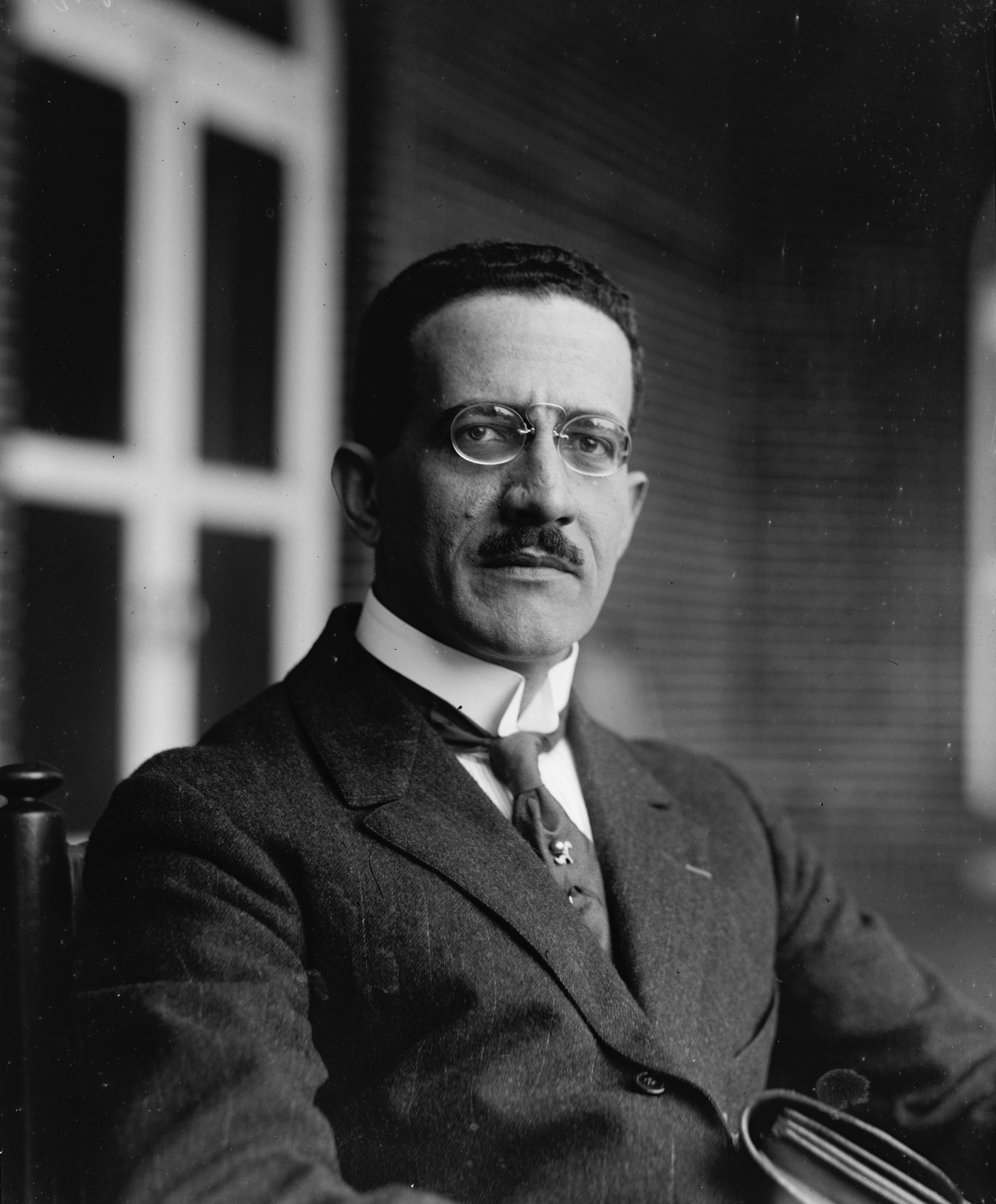
Panama's President Alfaro

- Ricardo Alfaro was installed as the new president of Panama.
- Born:
  - Johannes Rau, President of Germany from 1999 to 2004; in Wuppertal (d. 2006)
  - Ellen Holly, African-American stage actress and one of the first black soap opera stars, appearing in One Life to Live from 1968 to 1986; in New York City (d. 2023)

== Saturday, January 17, 1931 ==
- Almost 250,000 weavers in the Lancashire cotton mills were locked out by the mill owners.
- A special U.S. House of Representatives investigative subcommittee recommended legislation to check the activities of American communists.
- Born: James Earl Jones, American stage and film actor, winner of two Tony Awards, an Academy Award, an Emmy Award and a Grammy Award; in Arkabutla, Mississippi (d. 2024)

== Sunday, January 18, 1931 ==
- Germany celebrated the 60th anniversary of the founding of the German Empire. President Paul von Hindenburg gave a speech at the Berlin Sportpalast in front of 12,000 former officers and soldiers.
- Born: General Chun Doo-hwan, President of South Korea from 1980 to 1988; in Keishōnan-dō, South Gyeongsang Province, Chōsen, Japanese Empire (now Hapcheon, South Korea) (d. 2021)

== Monday, January 19, 1931 ==
- The first London Round Table Conference on India broke up with the Indian delegates having secured a pledge from Prime Minister Ramsay MacDonald to allow India to advance towards self-government.
- During an address in Philadelphia, Major General Smedley Butler recounted a story which he claimed to have been told by a friend who supposedly witnessed Benito Mussolini run over and kill a child while driving recklessly in Italy. Butler claimed that when his unnamed friend riding in the car screamed, Mussolini continued driving and said, "What is one life in the affairs of a state?" Butler's remarks led to a diplomatic row between Italy and the United States.
- Born:
  - Robert MacNeil, Canadian-born American novelist, news anchor and journalist who created and co-anchored The MacNeil/Lehrer Report from 1975 to 1995; in Montreal (d. 2024)
  - Jazeh Tabatabai, Iranian avant-garde painter, poet, and sculptor (d. 2008)

== Tuesday, January 20, 1931 ==
- U.S. president Hoover made the findings of the Wickersham Commission public. The report opposed repealing the Eighteenth Amendment but found that enforcement remained inadequate.
- The German film 1914 premiered.
- Born: David Lee, American physicist and 1996 Nobel laureate for his co-discovery of superfluidity in the isotope helium-3; in Rye, New York

== Wednesday, January 21, 1931 ==
- German foreign minister Julius Curtius spoke before the council of the League of Nations, accusing Poland of persecuting German minorities and reaffirming Germany's hopes to someday recover the territory lost to Poland in the Treaty of Versailles.
- British MPs defeated the Education Bill, which would have raised the minimum age for dropping out of school from 14 to 15.
- Died: Alma Rubens, 33, American film and stage actress, died from lobar pneumonia and bronchitis shortly after her release on bond for possession of cocaine

== Thursday, January 22, 1931 ==
- The government of French prime minister Théodore Steeg fell after less than six weeks when it was defeated in a vote on a plan to stabilize the price of wheat.
- The adventure film Trader Horn premiered at Grauman's Chinese Theatre in Hollywood.
- Born: Sam Cooke, African-American soul music singer and songwriter; as Samuel Cook in Clarksdale, Mississippi (d. 1964)

== Friday, January 23, 1931 ==
- A mob of unemployed Germans tried to attack Chancellor Heinrich Brüning as he arrived in Chemnitz to deliver a speech before industrialists. Mounted police charged and dispersed the rioters.
- Died:
  - Anna Pavlova, 49, Russian prima ballerina with the Imperial Russian Ballet and then the Ballets Russes, died of pleurisy while on tour
  - Ernst Seidler von Feuchtenegg, 68, Minister-President of Austria within Austria-Hungary during World War I

== Saturday, January 24, 1931 ==
- The results of a survey conducted by the Metropolitan Life Insurance Company were announced, estimating that 4.5 million Americans were out of work.
- Born: Lars Hörmander, Swedish mathematician who postulated the theory of linear partial differential operators and for whom Hörmander's condition is named; in Mjällby (d. 2012)

== Sunday, January 25, 1931 ==
- Germany's Chancellor Brüning told the German people to forget about reparations revisions and concentrate on putting public and private finances in order. "It is not only through reparations burdens that we have fallen into financial misfortune", he said, "but to a very large measure through letting ourselves imagine that despite a lost war, despite huge sacrifices in blood and treasure, both state and individual could live better than in pre-war times."

== Monday, January 26, 1931 ==
- The Mahatma Gandhi was freed from prison.
- The Western film Cimarron starring Richard Dix and Irene Dunne premiered at the Globe Theatre in New York City.
- Born: Alfred Lynch, English stage, film and television actor; in Whitechapel, London (d. 2003)

== Tuesday, January 27, 1931 ==
- Benito Mussolini sent a telegram to the Italian embassy in Washington, denying General Smedley Butler's story that he had run over and killed a child. "I've never run over children or women or men. If such misfortune had happened to me it is superfluous to state that I would have done what one must do in such cases: Namely, I'd have stopped and rendered assistance. It is really unworthy of the American general to tell such ignoble falsehoods", Mussolini stated. The Italian ambassador lodged a protest with the U.S. Department of State against Butler's "untrue and slanderous allegations".
- Pierre Laval became Prime Minister of France.
- Born: Mordecai Richler, Canadian novelist known for The Apprenticeship of Duddy Kravitz; in Montreal (d. 2001)

== Wednesday, January 28, 1931 ==
- A coal mine explosion in Linton, Indiana, killed 28 of the 38 workers on site.

== Thursday, January 29, 1931 ==
- Winston Churchill quit the Shadow Cabinet of the Conservative Party due to disagreement with Stanley Baldwin over the party's pledge to support the implementation of a new constitution for India.
- U.S. Army General Smedley Butler was ordered court martialed over his accusations against Italy's strongman Benito Mussolini.
- Born: Ferenc Mádl, President of Hungary from 2000 to 2005; in Bánd (d. 2011)

== Friday, January 30, 1931 ==
- Canadian prime minister R. B. Bennett visited the White House to hold informal talks with U.S. president Hoover.
- The Charlie Chaplin comedy drama film City Lights received its public premiere at the Los Angeles Theater with Albert Einstein as guest of honor. Contrary to the contemporaneous trend in cinema, it was a silent film, but with a score by Chaplin. Critically and commercially successful from the start, it was to place consistently in lists of films considered the best of all time.
- The P. G. Wodehouse novel Big Money was first published in book format, in New York.
- Born: Allan W. Eckert, American novelist, playwright and naturalist; in Buffalo, New York (d. 2011)

== Saturday, January 31, 1931 ==
- A federal judge revoked the American citizenship of Chicago gangster James Belcastro.
- Born: Ernie Banks, American baseball player in the Negro American League for the Kansas City Monarchs and the National League for the Chicago Cubs, later inducted into the Baseball Hall of Fame; in Dallas (d. 2015)
