= Five Star Final (play) =

Play by Louis Weitzenkorn

- Broadway program cover
- Original language: English
- Written by: Louis Weitzenkorn
- Genre: Melodrama

Premiere
- Date: December 30, 1930
- Place: Cort Theatre

Five Star Final is a play written by Louis Weitzenkorn. The story is a melodrama about the evils of tabloid journalism. Producer A. H. Woods staged it on Broadway, where it was a hit, running for 175 performances.

== Plot ==
An unscrupulous newspaper publisher decides to boost circulation by reviving an old scandal involving Nancy Voorhees, a woman who was accused of murdering her lover twenty years before. Although she was acquitted by a jury, Nancy fears the damage a revival of the story could cause her family. She is married and has a daughter who is about to have her own wedding to a wealthy young man whose family would not approve of Nancy's past. Nancy begs the assigned reporter not to pursue the story, but he refuses. When the story is published on their daughter's wedding day, Nancy and her husband commit suicide. The daughter seeks out the reporter to kill him for vengeance, but discovers that he is wracked with guilt over what he has done.

== Broadway production ==
Producer A. H. Woods acquired the rights to the play in 1930. At first his intention was to co-produce the play with William A. Brady and have it appear at Brady's Playhouse Theatre. However, this plan fell through and the production finally opened at the Cort Theatre on December 30, 1930, with just Woods producing. Worthington Miner directed. Arthur Byron played the reporter and Merle Maddern played Nancy.

Weitzenkorn was busy revising the script up until the premier, and apparently after as well. Reviewers complained that the first performance was insufficiently rehearsed, and descriptions of the scenes on opening night differ from what was done later.

== Cast and characters ==
The characters and cast from the Broadway production are given below:

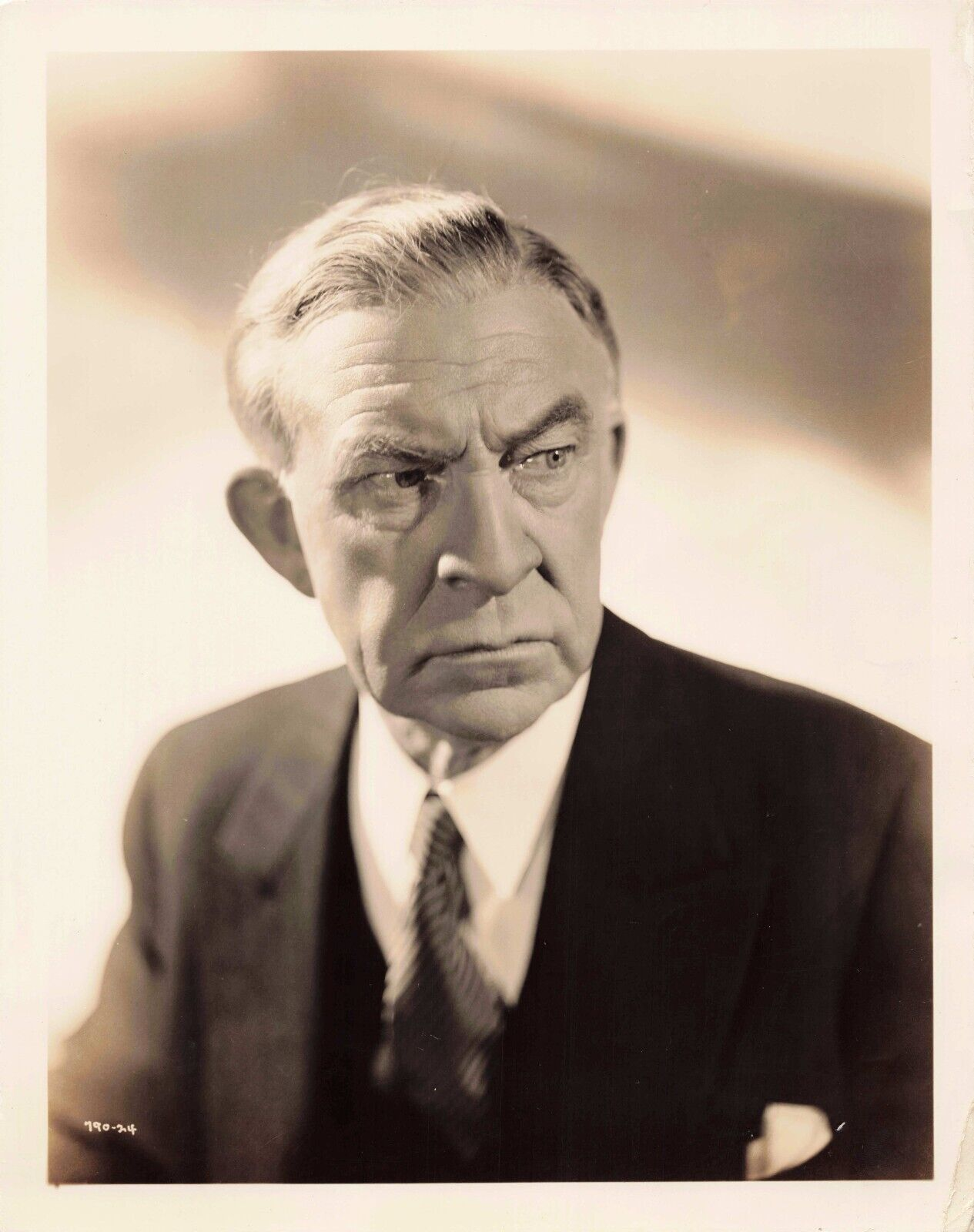
Arthur Byron played Randall in the Broadway production.

Cast of the Broadway production
Character	Broadway cast
Mr. Arthur Loveland Weeks	Sydney Booth
Exchange Operator	Lillian Bronson
Randall	Arthur Byron
Philip Weeks	King Calder
Hinchecliffe	Berton Churchill
Brannegan	Frank Dae
Colby	Kenneth Dana
A Policeman	Mike D'Arcy
Pearl	Amy Dennis
Michael Townsend	Malcolm Duncan
Jenny Townsend	Frances Fuller
Minerva	Georgette Harvey
Undertaker	Fred House
Harold	Richard Huey
Luella Carmody	Laurie Jacques
Ziggie Feinstein	Allen Jenkins
Jerry	P. J. Kelly
Arthur	Alvin Kerr
Mrs. Arthur Loveland Weeks	Kathryn Keyes
Rooney	Bruce MacFarlane
Nancy Voorhees Townsend	Merle Maddern
Miss Edwards	Madeleine Marshall
Trixie	Dorothy McElhone
Rev. T. Vernon Isopod	Alexander Onslow
French	Henry Sherwood
Miss Taylor	Helene Sinnott

== Reception ==
The play received reviews that treated it as a justified indictment of sensationalist journalism, albeit with some reservations. In The New York Times, reviewer Brooks Atkinson took exception to uneven writing and performances, but described it as an "exposé" that deserved consideration "whatever your opinion of the dramatic workmanship". In an article several days later, Atkinson said the play was sometimes as sensationalistic as those it condemned, but it "strikes a crushing blow" against the press. In the Outlook and Independent, Otis Chatfield-Taylor described the production as flawed in several ways, but nonetheless "something very much to be seen" for its "moments of undeniable drama and pathos" and its "violent polemic" against journalistic scandal-mongering. He praised the work of Woods, Miner and the cast.

== Adaptations ==
The play was adapted as a movie twice. The 1931 movie Five Star Final was directed by Mervyn LeRoy and starred Edward G. Robinson, and was nominated for the Academy Award for Best Picture at the 5th Academy Awards. In 1936 the play was again adapted for a movie, this time titled Two Against the World. William C. McGann directed and Humphrey Bogart starred.
