= The Devil Is Driving (1932 film) =

1932 film

- Theatrical release poster
- Directed by: Benjamin Stoloff
- Screenplay by: Frank Mitchell Dazey; P.J. Wolfson; Allen Rivkin; Louis Weitzenkorn
- Produced by: Charles R. Rogers
- Starring: Edmund Lowe; Wynne Gibson; James Gleason; Lois Wilson; Alan Dinehart; Dickie Moore
- Cinematography: Henry Sharp
- Music by: Karl Hajos; John Leipold
- Production company: Paramount Pictures
- Distributed by: Paramount Pictures
- Release date: December 9, 1932
- Running time: 65 minutes
- Country: United States
- Language: English

The Devil Is Driving is a 1932 American pre-Code film directed by Benjamin Stoloff and starring Edmund Lowe. The film's title was typical of the sensationalistic titles of many pre-Code films. It runs a mere 63 minutes, and like many Pre-Code movies deals openly with issues like sex and violence. Lowe plays a chronic gambler who drifts into a life of crime. The New York Times gave the film a mixed review upon its release.

== Plot ==
Orville "Gabby" Denton is an alcoholic drifter with a chronic gambling problem. Despite his flaws he is beloved by his family. Gabby's brother-in-law Beef gets Gabby work as a mechanic at the Metropolitan Garage. The shop is a front to a stolen car ring. Beef, who is otherwise honest, is aware of this. One day, Gabby is sent to pick up Silver, Jenkins's girlfriend, whose car has broken down. They start a relationship and Silver leaves Jenkins. During a getaway, one of car thieves' hits Gabby's nephew Buddy, who is in the street driving a toy car. The driver makes it to the garage, and Buddy receives treatment at a hospital. A witness points out the car to Gabby, and he understands it's the car that drove into the garage to be repainted. He investigates and discovers a piece of Buddy's little car in the wheel of the stolen car. When he confronts Beef, Beef gets drunk and confronts Jenkins and the head of the stolen car ring. They kill Beef and make his death look accidental. Photographer Bill Jones gives Gabby a photograph of Beef in the car before the accident, which shows Beef was already dead. Silver and Gabby confront Jenkins. The criminals drive away but die in a car crash. With the hoodlums out of the way, Gabby marries Silver.

== Cast ==
- Edmund Lowe as 'Gabby' Denton
- Wynne Gibson as 'Silver'
- James Gleason as 'Beef' Evans
- Lois Wilson as Nancy Evans
- Alan Dinehart as Jenkins
- Dickie Moore as 'Buddy' Evans
- George Rosener as The Dummy
- Guinn "Big Boy" Williams as Mac

== Reception ==
Mordaunt Hall of The New York Times praised the performances of the actors and the film's brisk pace, but found the story highly implausible. Allmovie gave the film a positive review stating that the picture provided a few genuine surprises and moved quickly.
