= Louis Weitzenkorn =

American writer

- Born: May 28, 1893; Wilkes-Barre, Pennsylvania, U.S.
- Died: February 7, 1943 (aged 49); Wilkes-Barre, Pennsylvania, U.S.
- Education: Pennsylvania Military College; Columbia University
- Occupation: Writer
- Writing career
- Language: English
- Period: 1914–1938

Louis Weitzenkorn (May 28, 1893 – February 7, 1943) was an American writer and newspaper editor. He wrote a play about journalism, Five Star Final, that became a hit on Broadway in 1931. It was adapted as a movie, and Weitzenkorn subsequently wrote several screenplays.

== Early life ==
Born in Wilkes-Barre, Pennsylvania in May 1893, Weitzenkorn attended the Pennsylvania Military College in Chester, Pennsylvania. In 1912 he received a journalism degree from Columbia University.

== Career ==
In 1914 Weitzenkorn became a reporter for the New-York Tribune. He subsequently wrote for The New York Times and the New York Call. In 1924 he became features editor for the New York World. In 1929 he took over as editor of the New York Evening Graphic, a popular but scandalous tabloid that was called the "porno-Graphic" by its critics.

While still working as a journalist, Weitzenkorn began writing fiction. In 1929, his play First Mortgage had a brief run on Broadway at the Broadhurst Theatre, but closed after just four performances. His experience with journalism inspired him to write another play, Five Star Final. A. H. Woods produced it at the Cort Theater, where it opened on December 30, 1930. The play was a hit, running for six months with 175 performances. He subsequently wrote a third play, called And the Sun Goes Down.

Five Star Final was adapted as a movie in 1931 starring Edward G. Robinson and Boris Karloff; the film was nominated for a Best Picture Academy Award. Weitzenkorn wrote several other screenplays, including 24 Hours (1931), Men of Chance (1931) and The Devil is Driving (1932). His last screenplay was King of the Newsboys, co-written with Peggy Thompson in 1938, after which he became a reporter for the New York Post.

== Personal life ==
Weitzenkorn was married five times.

On the morning of February 7, 1943, Weitzenkorn's clothes caught fire as he was making a pot of coffee. His wife found him burned to death in a chair next to the stove.
