= History of the Detroit Lions =

The history of the Detroit Lions, a professional American football franchise based in Detroit, dates back to 1928 when they played in Portsmouth, Ohio as the Spartans. They joined the National Football League (NFL) in 1930 before they were bought by George A. Richards, a radio executive, and moved to Detroit and changed their name to the Lions in 1934 and won their first NFL Championship the following season. The Lions had their most success in the 1950s, winning the NFL Championship three times, in 1952, 1953, and 1957, and made several playoff appearances in the 1990s. In 2025, they played their 96th season, continuing to be one of the NFL's oldest franchises.

== Portsmouth Spartans (1928–1933) ==
The Lions franchise was originally based in Portsmouth, Ohio as the Spartans. Originally an independent team, they joined the National Football League in 1930, after which they compiled a 28–16–7 record by the end of the 1933 season, including a berth in the first-ever game with the league title at stake in 1932. However, while they were successful on the field, they lived a hand-to-mouth existence off of it. At one point, players were given stock in the team in lieu of their salaries. By this time, it was apparent that mid-size cities like Portsmouth could no longer support an NFL team.

== Move to Detroit and early success (1934–1938) ==
Following the 1933 season, the team relocated to Detroit, where they were renamed the Lions

In 1934, George A. Richards, a radio executive who owned WJR, a radio affiliate of the NBC Blue Network (the forerunner to today's ABC), purchased the Portsmouth Spartans for $8,000 and moved the team to Detroit, renaming them the Detroit Lions. Richards picked the name because he intended to put together a team that would be the "king of the NFL," much like the lion was the king of the jungle. He also wanted a tie-in to baseball's Detroit Tigers.

In their inaugural season in Detroit several months later, the Lions started off with a 10-game win streak that included seven shutouts. However, they lost the last three games of the season to the Green Bay Packers and Chicago Bears and finished in second place behind the Bears in the Western Division, once again coming up short to their rivals. That same year, Richards negotiated an agreement with NBC to carry his Thanksgiving games live across all of the network's affiliated stations. Since then, the Lions have played on Thanksgiving every season with the exception of the years during World War II. In 1935, Dutch Clark led the NFL with 55 points, while Ernie Caddel led the league with 621 yards as they carried the Lions to a 7–3–2 record, which was first in the Western Division. As a result, they advanced to the 1935 NFL Championship Game against the New York Giants. The game was played on December 15, 1935, in front of 15,000 fans in Detroit. The Lions won the game 26–7 to secure the franchise's first World Championship, contributing to Detroit's City of Champions for the 1935–36 sports season, during which the Detroit Tigers won the 1935 World Series and the Detroit Red Wings captured the 1936 Stanley Cup.

After the season ended, the Lions played a team of NFL All-Stars in an exhibition game on January 1, 1936, winning 33–0. They played four additional exhibition games: a 67–14 win over the Westwood Cubs on January 13, a 42–7 win over the Los Angeles All-Stars on January 20, a 10–3 victory over the Green Bay Packers on January 26, and a 30–6 victory over the Hawaii All-Stars on February 9. Over the next two years, the Lions had records of 8–4 and 7–4 but finished third in the Western Division both years, again behind the Bears and Packers. After falling one game short of the Packers in 1938, both Dutch Clark and Ernie Caddel decided to retire.

== Struggling (1939–1949) ==
In 1939, the Lions' first year without their superstar players, they managed a disappointing record of 6–5. This season would set the tone for the next decade. Before the 1940 season, Richards, then living in Beverly Hills and in poor health, sold the team to Fred L. Mandel Jr., a 31-year-old member of the family that owned the Mandel Brothers Department Store of Chicago.

The 1940s saw the Lions win only 35 games. The low point was when they went 0–11 in 1942, scoring only five touchdowns all season, getting shut out five times, and never scoring more than seven points in a single game. With the first overall pick in the 1943 NFL draft, the Lions drafted Frank Sinkwich from Georgia. The Lions finished the 1943 season with a 3–6–1 record. A notable occurrence during the season happened on November 7 when the Lions and the New York Giants played to a scoreless tie. As of 2025, this was the last time an NFL game has ended in a scoreless tie. In 1944, Sinkwich won the NFL Most Valuable Player award after leading the Lions from a 1–3–1 start to a 6–3–1 finish. It was the team's first winning record since 1939.

Detroit improved on that record in 1945, finishing 7–3. They were second in the Western Division behind the Cleveland Rams. The Lions were less successful in the latter half of the decade; in 1946, they only managed one win all year, while in 1947, they won only three games. With the sixth overall pick in the 1948 NFL draft, the Lions drafted quarterback Y. A. Tittle. However, he never signed with the team, instead joining the Baltimore Colts of the All-America Football Conference.

On January 15, 1948, the NFL owners unanimously approved the sale of the Lions from Fred J. Mandel to the Detroit Football Company, a seven-person syndicate led by D. Lyle Fife. The Lions won only two games that year, but they kept building up their roster by trading quarterback Johnny Rauch's draft rights to the New York Bulldogs in exchange for the draft rights to Doak Walker. In 1949, the Lions improved to 4–8, missing the playoffs for a fourteenth consecutive season. That December, team president D. Lyle Fife resigned for "personal reasons" and was succeeded by Edwin J. Anderson.

== Team of the 1950s (1950–1958) ==
The Detroit Lions 1954 Football Highlights (1954) (34:19)
Highlight reel of the Lions' 1954 season

At the start of the 1950s, the Lions had a roster to compete for championships, but were still in need of a franchise quarterback. To solve this, they traded fullback Camp Wilson to the New York Yanks in exchange for quarterback Bobby Layne. After finishing a disappointing 6–6 in 1950, head coach Bo McMillin resigned. He was replaced by Buddy Parker, who had previously played for the Lions in the mid-1930s, including being a part of the 1935 championship team. The following season saw the Lions improve with a 7–4–1 record. In 1952, the Lions finished with a 9–3 record, tied with the Los Angeles Rams for first in the NFL's National Conference. Thus, for the first time in 17 years, the team returned to the playoffs.

In the National Conference Playoff, the Lions defeated the Rams 31–21 in front of nearly 50,000 spectators at Briggs Stadium in Detroit, playing in fog. The win sent the Lions back to the NFL Championship Game against the Cleveland Browns, which was the first of four championship games the two teams would play against each other during the decade. The Lions defeated the Browns by a score of 17–7 to win the second title in franchise history. The next year saw the Lions enjoy one of the greatest seasons in franchise history. They would draft future Hall of Fame linebacker Joe Schmidt in the seventh round of the 1953 NFL draft. The Lions went 10–2, which was good for first place in the renamed Western Conference. In addition, the team had seven Pro Bowlers, eight All-Pros, and swept their division rivals Chicago and Green Bay in four consecutive weeks. The Lions faced the Browns in the 1953 NFL Championship Game, in which Layne found Jim Doran for a 33-yard game-winning touchdown in the final minutes to win 17–16. In 1954, the Lions would finish with a 9–2–1 record. They faced the Browns in the NFL Championship Game for a third consecutive season. This time, however, the Browns destroyed the Lions 56–10, ruining their shot at a three-peat.

Despite the Lions' success early in the decade, the mid-1950s looked like a falling off point for the team. The Lions won only three games in 1955. In the following season, the team finished in second place to the Chicago Bears with a 9–3 record. During the 1957 preseason, Buddy Parker stunned the football world by announcing his resignation from the organization. George Wilson took over as head coach. Despite the turmoil, the Lions finished 8–4, tied with the San Francisco 49ers for first in the Western Conference. As a result, the two teams faced each other in a playoff game in San Francisco. During the game, the 49ers took a 24–7 lead into halftime behind three touchdown passes from Y. A. Tittle. During halftime, the 49ers, who assumed they had the game locked up, celebrated in their locker room. Because the walls in Kezar Stadium were so thin and the locker rooms were right next to each other, the Lions heard it.

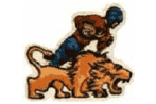
Primary Logo, 1952–1960.

George Wilson stood up and said, "I was going to say something, but that's what they think of you". On the first play of the second half, 49ers running back Hugh McElhenny broke off a 71-yard run to the Detroit 9 yard line, but the Lions held the 49ers to a field goal, which was San Francisco's last points of the day. Bobby Layne had been lost to injury three weeks prior, but Lions backup quarterback Tobin Rote led the team to 24 unanswered points and a 31–27 come from behind win. The next week, in the NFL Championship Game, Rote threw for four touchdowns and ran in another as the Lions routed the Browns 59–14, claiming their third championship in six years. To date, this is the last championship they have won.

In 1958, the Lions traded Bobby Layne to the Pittsburgh Steelers in exchange for Earl Morrall and two future draft picks. According to legend, as he was leaving for Pittsburgh, Layne said that the Lions would not win another championship for 50 years. Since this time, the Lions have not won another championship and the franchise's subsequent years of (mostly) futility has been labeled "The Curse of Bobby Layne." Without Layne, the Lions finished with a 4–7–1 record.

== Adjusting to life without Bobby Layne and committing to defense (1959–1969) ==
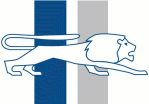
Primary logo, 1961–1969.

A 3–8–1 season in 1959 meant the Lions closed out their most successful decade in disappointing fashion. Going into the 1960s, the Lions decided to go with a new rebuild, this time centered around defense. The team started by trading defensive end Gerry Perry to the St. Louis Cardinals for cornerback Dick "Night Train" Lane. Joe Schmidt later called it "one of the best trades that will ever be made in any sport". Lane made three Pro Bowls and four All Pro selections as a Lion. Detroit also drafted star defensive tackle Roger Brown to pair with Alex Karras, Sam Williams and Darris McCord, forming one of the most fierce defensive lines in pro football history.

The Lions also still had '50s stars Joe Schmidt and Yale Lary as well as cornerback Dick LeBeau, who the team signed in 1959. Despite a 0–3 start in 1960, the Lions put together a 7–2 record to end the year at 7–5 overall. The Lions finished second in the Western Conference and earned a trip to the Playoff Bowl against their rivals the Cleveland Browns, who finished second in the Eastern Conference. The game was played on January 7, 1961, at the Miami Orange Bowl in Miami, and was the fifth (and to date last) playoff game between the teams. The Lions defeated the Browns 17–16.

In 1961, a group of stockholders led by former president D. Lyle Fife attempted to remove Edwin J. Anderson as team president. Anderson resigned and one of his supporters, William Clay Ford Sr., was chosen to succeed him. Anderson was allowed to stay on as general manager. That year, the Lions improved slightly, finishing 8–5–1 and returned to the Playoff Bowl where they destroyed the Philadelphia Eagles 38–10. The peak of the Lions' early '60s defense came in 1962 when they put together an 11–3 record and became only the third team in NFL history to never trail by more than 7 points in a game. While the Lions finished behind the Packers again, they managed to defeat them on Thanksgiving Day in Detroit 26–14 in a game that became known as the "Thanksgiving Day Massacre". This was the Packers' only loss of the season, as they eventually won the 1962 NFL Championship. The Lions went to the Playoff Bowl for the third year in a row, defeating the Pittsburgh Steelers 17–10.

Detroit's luck came to an end in 1963 as the team fell apart, finishing 5–8–1. A betting scandal involving Alex Karras and Packers running back Paul Hornung, which led to both players being suspended for the 1963 season, also played a part in the Lions' collapse.

On November 22, 1963, William Clay Ford Sr. purchased a controlling interest in the team for $6 million. The sale was completed on January 10, 1964. During Ford's ownership tenure, which extended to his death in 2014, the Lions won just a single playoff game.

The team would improve the next year, finishing 7–5–2. Despite this, they missed the playoffs. The Lions began losing its defense when Yale Lary retired following the 1964 season, while both Schmidt and Lane retired a year later. In the mid-1960s, the Lions served as the backdrop for the sports literature of George Plimpton, who spent time in the Lions training camp masquerading as a player. This was the basic material for his book Paper Lion, later made into a movie starring Alan Alda plus a number of actual Lions players, including Alex Karras.

The Lions struggled through the mid to late '60s, but used the time to rebuild their roster eventually drafting Lem Barney to replace Lane, Bob Kowalkowski and Ed Flanagan to build up the offensive line and running back Mel Farr. Despite said players being Pro Bowlers, the Lions still needed a franchise player which they found in the 3rd round of the 1968 NFL/AFL draft when they drafted Hall of Fame tight end Charlie Sanders, a 7-time Pro Bowler who is considered one of the best players to ever play the position.

== Decade of mediocrity (1970–1981) ==
With the AFL–NFL merger, the Lions were placed in the new NFC Central division with the Chicago Bears, Green Bay Packers, and Minnesota Vikings. Motown soul singer Marvin Gaye made plans, after the death of duet partner Tammi Terrell, to join the Lions and go into football. He gained weight and trained for his tryout in 1970, but was cut early on. He remained friends with a number of the players, particularly Mel Farr and Lem Barney, who appear as background vocalists on his 1971 classic single "What's Going On." Finishing with a 10–4 record, they were the first team to qualify for the NFL's newly created wild card playoff position. However, they lost to the Dallas Cowboys 5–0 after a long, grinding defensive struggle and did not see the postseason again for the rest of the decade.

Despite the loss, the 1970 Lions remains one of the best teams in franchise history and one of the most underrated teams in NFL history. Also in 1970, the Lions were the opponent on the day Tom Dempsey of the New Orleans Saints kicked what was then the longest field goal in NFL history. Dempsey's 63-yard effort on the game's final play lifted the Saints to a 19–17 victory over the Lions. While playing at home against the Bears on October 24, 1971, tragedy struck when wide receiver Chuck Hughes collapsed and died of a massive heart attack. He remains the only NFL player to ever die on the field. To honor his memory, the team wore black armbands for the rest of the season and retired his #85, although the number eventually returned to circulation.

In 1972, the Lions improved to 8–5–1. In the following season, they regressed to 6–7–1. Heart disease claimed another member of the franchise when head coach Don McCafferty died shortly before training camp in 1974. That season saw the Lions finish at 7–7. On Thanksgiving Day, November 28, 1974, after over 35 years, the Lions played their final game at Tiger Stadium, where they lost to the Denver Broncos 31–27 in front of 51,157, amidst snow flurries and a 21–point Broncos third quarter. The Lions moved to a newly constructed, domed stadium in suburban Pontiac. Another 7–7 record was produced in 1975, the Lions' first year indoors. This was followed by a 6–8 showing in 1976. The team finished with an identical 6–8 record in 1977, struggling the whole season with an anemic offense that only put up 183 points. More mediocrity followed in 1978 with seven wins in the newly expanded 16-game season. The bottom fell out in 1979 with a 2–14 record.

This gave the Lions the first overall pick in 1980 NFL draft, which they used to draft Heisman Trophy winner Billy Sims from Oklahoma. Detroit also drafted quarterback Eric Hipple in the fourth round of the draft, who became the Lions starting quarterback for most of the decade. Detroit improved immediately in 1980, jumping out to a 4–0 start, before finishing with a 9–7 record, tied for first place in the Central Division with the Vikings, but failing to qualify for the playoffs due to Minnesota winning more games within the conference. The next year, the Lions had a chance to win the division on the final week of the season by defeating the Buccaneers at home; however, they lost that game, once again failing to qualify for the playoffs, as they finished 8–8.

== NFC Central Division champions and Billy Sims retires (1982–1988) ==
The Lions entered 1982 with hope for a possible playoff run. However, after a 2–0 start, a player's strike cancelled seven games, cutting the season to nine games. After the strike ended, the Lions finished 2–5. Despite this, a 4–5 record was good enough to qualify for the playoffs. They became the second team to qualify for the playoffs with a losing record. In the Wild Card Round, the Lions were routed 31–7 by the eventual Super Bowl champion Washington Redskins. In the following season, the Lions won 9 games in to capture the NFL Central division championship.

On December 31, 1983, the Lions faced the San Francisco 49ers in the NFC Divisional Round. After the 49ers took a 14–3 in the first quarter, the Lions were able to trim the deficit to 14–9 by halftime on couple of field goals by kicker Eddie Murray, who made a then postseason record 54-yard kick in the closing seconds of the first half. Thanks to two touchdown runs by Billy Sims, the Lions led for the first time by the score of 23–17 with 4:54 left in the fourth quarter. Joe Montana then made one of his signature fourth quarter drives by completing six passes, the last of which was the go-ahead touchdown to Freddie Solomon, which gave the 49ers a 24–23 lead with 1:23 left. The Lions were not done. Even though backup quarterback Gary Danielson, who had replaced an injured Eric Hipple, threw five interceptions, he pieced together a closing drive to put the team within field goal range with 11 seconds left. Murray, who had previously made three of four field goals, missed for the second time from 43 yards on a kick that went wide right, which secured the victory for the 49ers.

On October 21, 1984, during a game against the Minnesota Vikings, Billy Sims suffered a career ending knee injury. He spent two years trying to rehab his injury before retiring in 1986. Sims' injury would set the tone for the rest of the season as the Lions finished with a 4–11–1 record. Monte Clark was fired after the season. The Lions brought in Darryl Rogers, considered to be an offensive guru who previously coached at the college level. However, his tenure was marked with much disappointment. From 1985 to mid-season in 1988, he had acquired the record of 18–40 and was 2–9 in 1988 before he was fired. He was replaced by interim head coach Wayne Fontes, who by the end of his coaching career, was considered to be one of the best coaches in franchise history and had the distinction of having the most wins and losses of any head coach in franchise history.

== Barry Sanders era (1989–1998) ==
With the third overall draft pick in the 1989 NFL draft, the Lions selected another Heisman Trophy-winning running back, Barry Sanders from Oklahoma State. He played on offense with another rookie at quarterback, Rodney Peete. While the Lions showed improvement, they still finished a distant third in the NFC Central with a 7–9 record. During his rookie season, Sanders rushed for 1,470 yards on 280 carries, and finished second in rushing just 10 yards behind the leader, Christian Okoye. He had an opportunity to win the rushing title by going back in late in the final game of the season. However, with the Lions leading by the score of 31–24 with less than a minute to go, he took a pass, which became a trademark of his career. Sanders earned the Offensive Rookie of the Year award following the season.

With such a young core, which included eventual Pro Bowlers Jerry Ball, Bennie Blades and Chris Spielman, things were once again looking up for the Lions. However, they took a step back when they finished 6–10 in the 1990 season. Sanders won the first of his four NFL rushing titles that season with 1,304 yards, beating out Buffalo Bills running back Thurman Thomas by seven yards. In 1991, the Lions started the season by being shut out on national television, 45–0, by the Washington Redskins. However, they rebounded, winning their next five games. They went 12–4 for the season, and won their first division title in eight years, capping the regular season with a win over the defending AFC Champion Bills. They were inspired late in the season by the loss of guard Mike Utley, who sustained a career ending paralysis injury against the Los Angeles Rams on November 17, 1991. As Utley was carted off the field, he flashed a thumbs up to his teammates and the Silverdome crowd. It became a rallying symbol for the remainder of the season.

In the Divisional Round, the Lions played their first home playoff game since the 1957 championship season. They dismantled the Dallas Cowboys 38–6 for the franchise's first playoff win since 1957. However, in the NFC Championship Game, they were once again completely overpowered by the Redskins, this time by the score of 41–10.

In the following season, the Lions were unable to sustain their success, as they finished in last place in the NFC Central with a disappointing 5–11 record. They rebounded in 1993 to secure the division title with a 10–6 record. In the Wild Card Round, the Lions suffered a heartbreaking 28–24 loss to the Green Bay Packers. In 1994, the Lions went 9–7, clinching a playoff berth for the third time in four years. However, they once again suffered another heartbreaking loss to the Packers in Wild Card Round, this time by the score of 16–12. In 1995, the Lions started the season 0–3. However, they recovered to finish 10–6. They actually had an opportunity to win the division title if the Pittsburgh Steelers defeated the Packers in the final game of the season. It was not meant to be as the Packers won 24–19. As a result, the Lions went on the road to face the Philadelphia Eagles. In the Wild Card Round, the Eagles embarrassed the Lions by the score of 58–37. In the following season, the Lions regressed with a 5–11 record to finish last in the division. After the season, Wayne Fontes was fired as head coach. He was succeeded by Bobby Ross.

The 1997 season saw the Lions go 9–7 to clinch a playoff berth. During the season, Sanders ran for 2,053 rushing yards, becoming the third running back to join the 2,000-yard club. In the Wild Card Round, the Tampa Bay Buccaneers defeated the Lions 20–10. In 1998, the Lions finished fourth in the NFC Central with a disappointing 5–11 record. Following the season, Sanders announced his retirement.

== Post-Barry Sanders retirement and the Matt Millen era (1999–2008) ==
Detroit Lions logo: 2003–2008

After Barry Sanders retired, the 1999 season shockingly saw the Lions make the playoffs with an 8–8 record, before being dispatched by the Washington Redskins 27–13 in the Wild Card Round. Nine games into the 2000 season, Bobby Ross resigned as head coach following an embarrassing loss to the Miami Dolphins. He was replaced by assistant head coach Gary Moeller. The Lions had an opportunity to clinch a playoff berth in the final game of the season if they defeated the Chicago Bears. However, Paul Edinger kicked a 54-yard field goal with two seconds left to give the Bears a stunning 23–20 win. As a result, the Lions missed the playoffs, finishing at 9–7.

Following the season, the Lions hired Matt Millen, a former player and broadcaster, as team president and CEO. With his first act as team president, Millen fired Gary Moeller as head coach, replacing him with Marty Mornhinweg. The Lions fell apart in 2001, leading many to believe that they might become the first team to go 0–16 in a season. After starting 0–12, the Lions finally managed to win a game on December 16 by defeating their rivals, the Minnesota Vikings. After two more losses, the Lions played their final game of the season on January 6, 2002. In what was to be the final game played at the Pontiac Silverdome, the 1–14 Lions hosted the 5–10 Dallas Cowboys. Despite there not being much hype or any playoff implications to the game, 77,512 fans came out to watch the Lions defeat the Cowboys 15–10.

During the offseason, the NFL realigned to eight divisions of four teams thanks to the addition of the expansion Houston Texans. As such, the NFC Central became the NFC North. In the 2002 NFL draft, the Lions selected Oregon quarterback Joey Harrington with the third overall pick. 2002 served as the inaugural season where the Lions played at the new Ford Field in Downtown Detroit. This also was the first time the franchise had played in the city since 1974. Despite this, the Lions had little success as they went 3–13. Following the season, Marty Mornhinweg was fired and Steve Mariucci was hired as the new head coach.

With the second overall pick in the 2003 NFL draft, the Lions selected local favorite Charles Rogers. The team finished 2003 with a 5–11 record. Rogers got off to a hot start, but was injured in the middle of the season, and because of this, the Lions drafted wide receiver Roy Williams seventh overall in the 2004 NFL draft.

The Lions went the entire 2001, 2002, and 2003 seasons without a road victory. This streak, encompassing of a then NFL record 24 games, came to an end on September 12, 2004, when they defeated the Bears 20–16 at Soldier Field in Chicago. The Lions finished the 2004 season with a 6–10 record. Prior to the start of the 2005 season, Millen received a five-year contract extension. On November 28, Steve Mariucci was fired as head coach, while defensive coordinator Dick Jauron was promoted as interim coach. Ultimately, the Lions went 5–11.

On January 19, 2006, the Lions hired Rod Marinelli to be the new head coach. Prior to the start of the 2006 season, the Lions traded Joey Harrington to the Miami Dolphins. Several months later, they released Charles Rogers. Despite the changes, the team finished 3–13. With the second overall pick in the 2007 NFL draft, the Lions selected Georgia Tech wide receiver Calvin Johnson. The Lions began the 2007 season with a promising 6–2 record. The optimism was short-lived, however, as the team recorded only a single victory in the next eight games, for a final record of 7–9.

=== 2008: 0–16 ===
Hoping to rebound from the disappointing finish to the 2007 season, things appeared to be looking up for the Lions heading into the 2008 season as they went 4–0 during the preseason. Once the regular season started, however, they would hit rock bottom. After starting 0–3, Matt Millen was fired as team president and CEO. Over seven seasons under his leadership as team president, the Lions owned the NFL's worst winning percentage (31–84, .270), never had a winning season, never finished higher than third place in the NFC North, and did not play in any postseason games. Tom Lewand was appointed team president, while assistant general manager Martin Mayhew was promoted to general manager.

The Lions never recovered as they finished 0–16, becoming the first team in NFL history to go winless in a 16-game season. This was later matched by the 2017 Cleveland Browns. The Lions were the first team to go winless since the 1982 Baltimore Colts went 0–8–1 in the strike-shortened season and the first in a non-strike season since the 1976 expansion Tampa Bay Buccaneers. The Lions' 16 straight losses in 2008 also broke the record for most consecutive losses in a single season, previously held by the 2001 Carolina Panthers, who lost 15 straight games after winning their opener. Following the season, Rod Marinelli was fired as head coach.

== Matthew Stafford and Calvin Johnson era (2009–2015) ==
=== 2009 ===
On January 15, 2009, the Lions hired Jim Schwartz as head coach. Schwartz spent ten seasons with the Tennessee Titans, eight of them as defensive coordinator. The Lions also hired a new defensive coordinator (Gunther Cunningham) and a new offensive coordinator (Scott Linehan). In April, they adopted a new logo, which was a more fierce version of their previous logo.

The Lions selected Georgia quarterback Matthew Stafford with the first overall pick in the 2009 NFL draft. They agreed on a six-year, $72 million contract, with $41.7 million in guaranteed money.

In the first two games of 2009, the Lions lost to the New Orleans Saints and Minnesota Vikings. On September 27, 2009, the team broke their 19-game losing streak with a 19–14 win at Ford Field against the Washington Redskins. Losses resumed after that, which included handing the winless St. Louis Rams their only victory of the season. The Lions' only other win of the season was against the Cleveland Browns, a surprise 38–37 thriller that saw Matthew Stafford throw the game winning touchdown pass as time expired. The Lions then hosted the Green Bay Packers on their annual Thanksgiving game and lost 34–12. The Lions finished the season at 2–14.

=== 2010 ===
In the 2010 NFL draft, the Lions used the second overall pick to select Nebraska defensive tackle Ndamukong Suh. The Lions began their 2010 season in Chicago. Despite having the lead for most of the game, the Lions suffered a heartbreaking 19–14 loss to the Chicago Bears when an apparent go-ahead touchdown catch by Calvin Johnson was ruled incomplete in an extremely controversial decision. Week 2 saw the Lions lose in a close game to the Philadelphia Eagles. After this, they headed to Minnesota to take on the struggling Minnesota Vikings. However, they were once again denied a victory, as they lost 24–10.

Following this, the Lions came close to securing their first win in Wisconsin since 1991, but ultimately lost 28–26. The Lions finally gained their first victory of the season when the St. Louis Rams returned to Ford Field in Week 5 and lost 44–6. Following a loss to the New York Giants, the Lions defeated the Washington Redskins for their second straight victory over that team. Then came five losses in a row, including a Thanksgiving Day match with the New England Patriots where the Lions blew an early lead to lose 45–24.

However, Week 14 brought a considerable turn of events when the Packers arrived in Detroit and Aaron Rodgers was taken out with a concussion in the second quarter. Matt Flynn failed to score any touchdowns, and the Lions won their first divisional game since 2007. After this, the team suddenly entered a late season hot streak. They ended an NFL record 26-game road losing streak by beating the Tampa Bay Buccaneers 23–20 in overtime. Another road victory followed when the Lions knocked off the Miami Dolphins in Week 16. They returned home to beat the Vikings 20–13 to end the 2010 season 6–10.

=== 2011 ===
In the 2011 NFL draft, the Lions bolstered their defense when they selected Auburn defensive tackle Nick Fairley. The Lions opened the 2011 season with a 27–20 road win against the Tampa Bay Buccaneers. In Week 2, the Lions played their first home game against the Kansas City Chiefs. They torched the Chiefs 48–3 to set a franchise record for both the largest margin of victory and the most points scored in a regular season game. The team continued to improve in Week 3 as they climbed back from a 20-point deficit to win 26–23 in overtime to beat the Minnesota Vikings in Minnesota for the first time since 1997. This game marked the Lions' first 3–0 start since 1980. The next week, they defeated the Dallas Cowboys in a come from behind 34–30 win, moving to 4–0.

In Week 5, the Lions hosted the Chicago Bears in their first appearance on Monday Night Football since 2001. In front of a record setting crowd at Ford Field, the Lions defeated the Bears 24–13 to begin the season 5–0 for the first time since 1956.

The Lions took their first loss after being beaten by the San Francisco 49ers 25–19, but the game was more notable for Jim Schwartz getting into an altercation with 49ers coach Jim Harbaugh afterwards. The NFL decided not to punish either coach for the scuffle after deliberating on the matter. A second straight home loss followed as the Lions fell to the Atlanta Falcons 23–16. The following week, the Lions defeated the Denver Broncos on the road 45–10. The game included a 100-yard interception return for a touchdown by Chris Houston. In Week 10, the Lions failed to carry out a season sweep of the Bears as they lost 37–13.

On Thanksgiving, the Lions hosted the defending Super Bowl champion Green Bay Packers. The Packers won 27–15. Ndamukong Suh was ejected from the game after stomping on the arm of Packers offensive lineman Evan Dietrich-Smith, which enhanced his reputation as a dirty player. This earned him a two-game suspension as the Lions headed to New Orleans to take on the New Orleans Saints in Week 13. The game against the Saints was flexed into Sunday Night Football. The Saints defeated the Lions 31–17. Heading back home, the Lions edged past the struggling Vikings 34–28. The next week, the Lions went to Oakland to take on the Oakland Raiders. At the end of a close game, Matthew Stafford drove the team downfield and threw a go-ahead touchdown pass to Calvin Johnson. After the Raiders got the ball back, they attempted to kick a game-winning field goal, but Suh blocked the attempt to secure a 28–27 win for the Lions. In Week 16, the Lions defeated the San Diego Chargers at home 38–10. With the win, the Lions clinched a playoff berth for the first time since 1999. With only seeding still in question, they went to Green Bay to take on the Packers. Matt Flynn threw six touchdown passes, which was good enough to help the Packers defeat the Lions 45–41. As such, the Lions were relegated to facing the Saints on the road as the #6 seed with a 10–6 record. In the Wild Card Round, the Saints defeated the Lions 45–28.

=== 2012–2015 ===
The 2012 season saw the Lions try to improve over their impressive 2011 season. They started 4–4, then lost their last eight games to finish 4–12. Following the season, long time kicker Jason Hanson retired.

The 2013 season saw the team improve. By Week 10, following their first season series sweep of the Chicago Bears since 2007, the team was in first place in the NFC North. However, the Lions went on to lose their next two games. In Week 13, the team won their first Thanksgiving game since 2003 in a 40–10 whipping of the Green Bay Packers. The Lions then lost the final four games of the season to finish 7–9. This resulted in the firing of head coach Jim Schwartz on December 30.

On January 14, 2014, the Lions hired Jim Caldwell as their new head coach. He is the first African American head coach in the franchise's history.

On March 9, 2014, long time owner William Clay Ford Sr. died at the age of 88. On March 10, it was announced that controlling interest of the franchise would be passed down to Ford's widow, Martha.

During the 2014 season, the influence of Jim Caldwell improved the Lions drastically from the previous two seasons. Touting the league's second-best defense, the Lions posted an 11–5 record and qualified for the playoffs. However, the Lions suffered a controversial 24–20 loss to the Dallas Cowboys in the Wild Card Round.

On November 5, 2015, the Lions fired general manager Martin Mayhew and team president Tom Lewand, following a 1–7 start to the season. During Mayhew's tenure as general manager, the Lions were 41–63, and made the playoffs twice, losing both times in the Wild Card Round. On November 19, the Lions hired Rod Wood as team president. The Lions played better down the stretch to finish with a 7–9 record. This season marked the end of an era as Calvin Johnson retired after the season.

== Bob Quinn era (2016–2020) ==
=== 2016 ===
On January 8, 2016, the Lions hired former New England Patriots executive Bob Quinn as general manager. During the season, the Lions put together an NFL record eight fourth quarter comeback wins to set themselves up for a division title at 9–4. However, during a Week 14 win over the Chicago Bears, Matthew Stafford suffered an injury in the middle finger of his throwing hand. The injury derailed the season as the Lions finished 9–7, which was still good enough to make the playoffs as a wild card. In the Wild Card Round, they were defeated by the Seattle Seahawks 26–6.

=== 2017 ===
The Lions started the season with a 2–0 record. However, in Week 3, they suffered a controversial 30–26 loss at home to the Atlanta Falcons. This was followed up by them losing three of their next four games. The Lions bounced back by winning five of their next seven games to put themselves in the playoff race. In Week 16, the Lions went on the road to face the struggling Cincinnati Bengals. However, they lost the game 26–17, which eliminated them from playoff contention. In the final week of the season, the Lions defeated the Green Bay Packers 35–11 to finish 9–7. Jim Caldwell was fired as head coach the day after the season ended.

=== 2018 ===
On February 5, 2018, the Lions hired former New England Patriots defensive coordinator Matt Patricia as head coach. A glaring need for the franchise over the past few years had been running back. To finally fix the issue, they signed LeGarrette Blount from the Philadelphia Eagles and drafted Auburn running back Kerryon Johnson in the 2018 NFL draft. After losing the first two games of the season, the Lions would surprisingly defeat the Patriots 26–10 on Sunday Night Football. On October 24, the Lions acquired defensive tackle Damon Harrison from the New York Giants. A few days after losing to the Seattle Seahawks, they traded Golden Tate to the Eagles. The Lions struggled for the rest of the season as they posted a 6–10 record, finishing last in the NFC North. Following the season, Jim Bob Cooter was fired as offensive coordinator.

=== 2019 ===
On January 16, 2019, the Lions hired Darrell Bevell as offensive coordinator. They then released safety Glover Quin, T. J. Lang, and cornerback Nevin Lawson. They signed ex-Patriots wide receiver Danny Amendola to fill the hole left by Golden Tate and handed big contracts to ex-Patriots Justin Coleman and Trey Flowers. The team also signed tight end Jesse James from the Pittsburgh Steelers. In the 2019 NFL draft, they selected Iowa tight end T. J. Hockenson with the eighth overall pick. The Lions started the season 2–0–1. However, a series of devastating injuries and close losses broke the team, resulting in a 1–12 run the rest of the way, which included a stretch where they lost their last nine games to finish 3–12–1.

=== 2020 ===
On June 23, 2020, majority owner and chairperson Martha Firestone Ford stepped down. She was succeeded by her daughter Sheila Ford Hamp. On November 28, 2020, general manager Bob Quinn along with head coach Matt Patricia were fired by the Lions following a 4–7 start to the season; Patricia's overall record with the team was 13–29–1. Patricia was succeeded by the Lions' offensive coordinator, Darrell Bevell, who served as interim head coach for the remainder of the season. The Lions ultimately finished the season with a 5–11 record.

== Brad Holmes and Dan Campbell era (2021–present) ==
=== 2021 ===
On January 14, 2021, the Lions hired Brad Holmes as executive vice president and general manager. With Matt Patricia being fired, the Lions were on a search for their new head coach. Candidates included San Francisco 49ers defensive coordinator Robert Saleh, Kansas City Chiefs offensive coordinator Eric Bieniemy, New Orleans Saints assistant head coach Dan Campbell, former Cincinnati Bengals head coach Marvin Lewis, and Tampa Bay Buccaneers defensive coordinator Todd Bowles. The following day, it was reported that Campbell was a front-runner for the job. However, because the Saints were in the NFL playoffs, the Lions could not interview him. When the Saints lost to the Buccaneers, it was reported the Lions intended to hire Campbell. On January 20, Campbell and the Lions agreed to a six-year deal to become the next Lions head coach.

The biggest off-season move was made on March 18 when the Lions traded longtime quarterback Matthew Stafford to the Los Angeles Rams in exchange for quarterback Jared Goff, a third round pick in the 2021 draft, and first round picks in the 2022 and 2023 drafts. The Lions would get fortunate in the draft, managing to select offensive tackle Penei Sewell seventh overall and acquiring Amon-Ra St. Brown in the fourth round. Despite promising rookie seasons from the pair, the Lions finished the season at 3–13–1.

=== 2022 ===
2022 proved to be a major breakout year for the Lions. In the draft, the Lions acquired multiple pieces of their core, including defensive ends Aidan Hutchinson and Josh Paschal, wide receiver Jameson Williams, safety Kerby Joseph, and linebackers James Houston and Malcolm Rodriguez. While the team started the season at 1–6, they finished strong winning eight of their last ten games to go 9–8, their first winning season since 2017. However, thanks to the Seattle Seahawks beating the Los Angeles Rams 19–16 in overtime in Week 18, the team missed the playoffs for the sixth consecutive season. A notable occurrence during the year came when Jamaal Williams broke Barry Sanders' single-season touchdown record when he scored his 17th of the year against the Green Bay Packers.

=== 2023 ===
The Lions opened the season with a victory over the reigning Super Bowl champion Kansas City Chiefs. The win set the tone for the rest of the season, as the Lions finished 12–5, tying a franchise record for wins, and they won their first division title since 1993 and first since the NFC North was formed in 2002. As a result, they hosted their first playoff game since 1993, which was against former quarterback Matthew Stafford and the Los Angeles Rams. The Lions won the game 24–23, securing their first playoff win since 1991. In the divisional round, the Lions were able to host a second playoff game, a first for the franchise, as the Green Bay Packers eliminated the second-seeded Dallas Cowboys in the first round. The Lions played the NFC South champion Tampa Bay Buccaneers and won 31–23 to advance to their first NFC Championship Game since 1991. In the NFC Championship Game, the Lions lost to the San Francisco 49ers 34–31, despite holding a 24–7 lead at halftime.

=== 2024 ===
Despite being decimated by injuries, the Lions finished the 2024 season with the best record in franchise history at 15–2. As a result, they secured their second consecutive NFC North title, the No. 1 seed in the NFC for the first time, and a first-round bye for the first time since 1991. This included a franchise record eleven consecutive victories. In the Divisional Round, the Lions were defeated by the Washington Commanders 45–31.

=== 2025 ===
The Lions lost both of their coordinators, Ben Johnson and Aaron Glenn, to head coaching jobs. They were replaced by John Morton and Kelvin Sheppard, respectively. After beginning the season with a 4–1 record, the Lions regressed due to several factors. Following a Week 17 loss to the Minnesota Vikings, the Lions were eliminated from playoff contention for the first time since 2022. Despite this, they concluded their season on a positive note by winning their final game against the Chicago Bears. This victory resulted in a 9–8 record, securing the franchise's fourth consecutive winning season. This is the first time they accomplished this feat since 1969 to 1972.

=== 2026 ===
The Lions will attempt to improve upon their 9–8 record from the previous season and return to the playoffs after a one-year absence.

== See also ==
- List of Detroit Lions seasons
- List of Detroit Lions first-round draft picks

== Bibliography ==
- McDonough, Will (1994). 75 Seasons: The Complete Story of the National Football League. Atlanta: Turner Publishing, Inc. ISBN 1-57036-056-1
- Peterson, Robert W. (1997). Pigskin: The Early Years of Pro Football. New York: Oxford University Press. ISBN 0-19-507607-9
- Willis, Chris (2010). The Man Who Built the National Football League: Joe F. Carr. Lanham, Maryland: Scarecrow Press, Inc. ISBN 978-0-8108-7669-9
