= Bob Mann (American football) =

American football player (1924–2006)

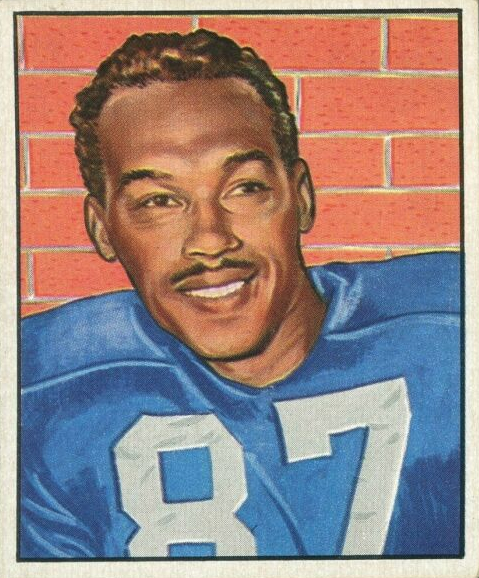
- Mann's 1950 Bowman football card

No. 31, 87
- Position: End

Personal information
- Born: April 8, 1924; New Bern, North Carolina, U.S.
- Died: October 21, 2006 (aged 82); Detroit, Michigan, U.S.
- Listed height: 5 ft 11 in (1.80 m)
- Listed weight: 172 lb (78 kg)

Career information
- High school: West Street (New Bern)
- College: Michigan (1944, 1946–1947)
- NFL draft: 1948: undrafted

Career history
- Detroit Lions (1948–1949); New York Yanks (1950)*; Green Bay Packers (1950–1954)
- * Offseason or practice squad member only

Awards and highlights
- NFL receiving yards leader (1949); Green Bay Packers Hall of Fame; Michigan Sports Hall of Fame; Second-team All-American (1947); First-team All-Big Nine (1947)

Career NFL statistics
- Receptions: 208
- Receiving yards: 3,203
- Receiving touchdowns: 24
- Stats at Pro Football Reference

Robert Mann (April 8, 1924 – October 21, 2006) was an American professional football player in the National Football League (NFL). A native of New Bern, North Carolina, Mann played college football for the Hampton Pirates in 1942 and 1943 and the Michigan Wolverines in 1944, 1946, and 1947. Playing the end position, he broke the Big Ten Conference record for receiving yards in 1946 and 1947. After not being selected in the 1948 NFL draft, Mann signed his first professional football contract with the Detroit Lions, where he stayed for two seasons. He later played for the Green Bay Packers for parts of five seasons until 1954. Mann broke the color barrier for both teams.

Mann led the NFL in receiving yards with 1,014 in the 1949 season. He was asked to take a pay cut after the season and became a holdout when the Lions opened practice in July 1950. He was traded to the New York Yanks in August 1950 and released three weeks later. Mann charged that he had been forced out of professional football for refusing to take a pay cut. He signed with the Green Bay Packers near the end of the 1950 NFL season and was the team's leading receiver in 1951. He remained with the Packers through part of the 1954 season. After his football career, Mann became a lawyer and practiced in Detroit. He was inducted into the Green Bay Packers Hall of Fame in 1988 and died on October 21, 2006, at the age of 82. He was posthumously inducted into the Michigan Sports Hall of Fame in 2016.

== Early life ==
Bob Mann was born in New Bern, the county seat of Craven County, North Carolina, in 1924. At the time of his childhood, New Bern was a small town of about 10,000 and was still segregated. His father, William Mann, was a physician, and his mother, Clara Mann, was a supervisor of Craven County elementary schools. Mann began his football career at West Street High School in New Bern.

== College football ==
=== Hampton Institute ===
In 1941, Mann enrolled at Hampton Institute (now known as Hampton University), a historically black university located in Hampton, Virginia. He joined their Pirates football team and, as a sophomore, he scored 45 of Hampton's 99 points while playing at the left end position. He scored three touchdowns in Hampton's final game of the season against Virginia Union.

=== University of Michigan ===
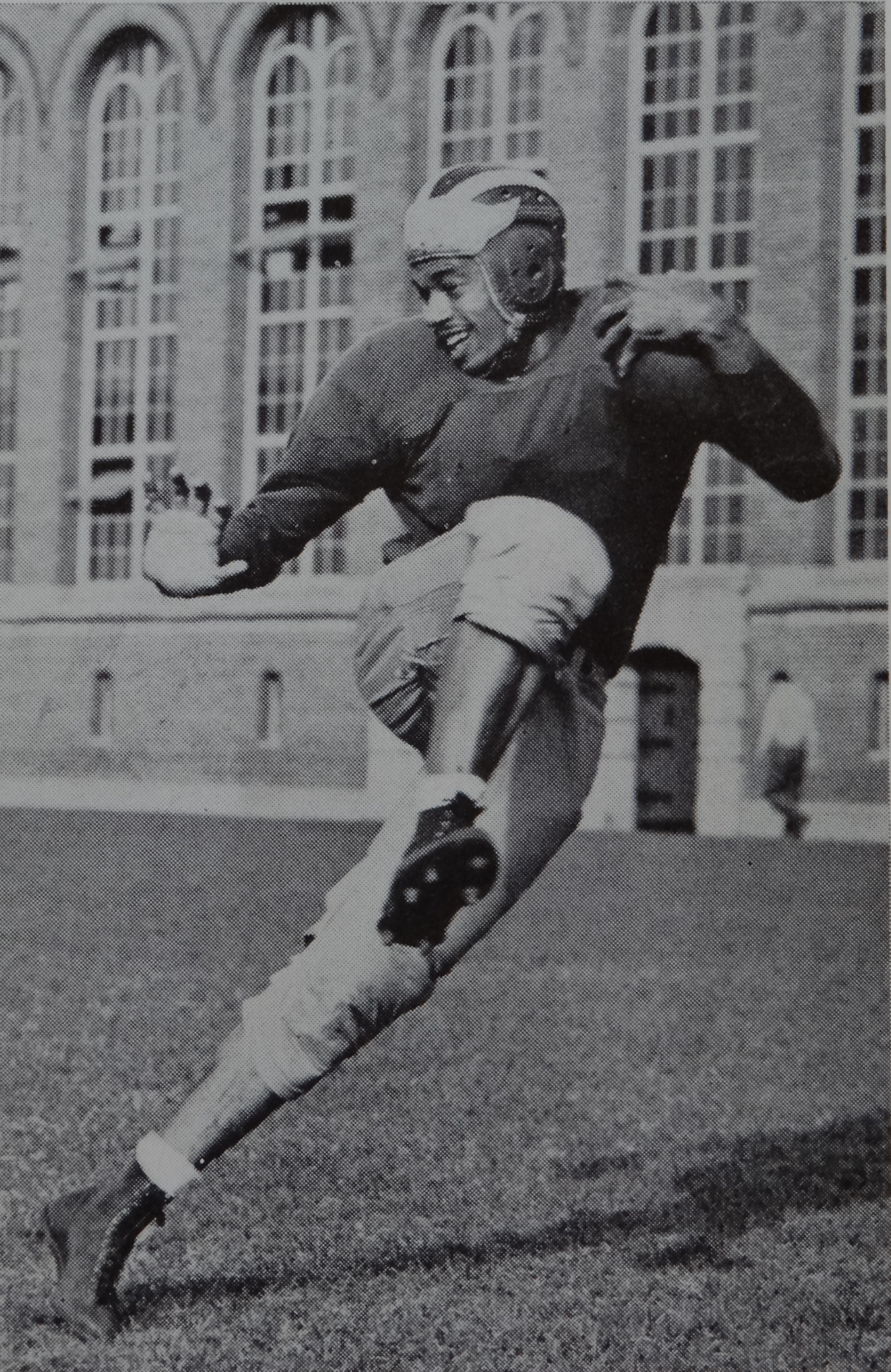
Mann posing in the 1947 University of Michigan yearbook

Mann transferred to the University of Michigan in 1944, where his father hoped that he would attend the university's medical program. He joined the football team as a walk-on and was one of only two African American players (Gene Derricotte was the other) on the 1944 Michigan Wolverines football team. Mann served in the Navy from 1944 until the end of World War II, although he was stationed in Staten Island and was not deployed overseas. After his service, he returned to Michigan in 1946.

Mann started two games at the left end for Fritz Crisler's 1946 Michigan football team. On November 16 against Wisconsin, he caught three passes for 74 yards and two touchdowns, while also gaining 26 yards on two end-around runs. Against Ohio State the following week, he had 101 yards receiving on 5 catches, 2 of which went for touchdowns. He added another 33 yards on two end-around runs. Despite seeing only limited action, his 1946 total of 13 receptions for 284 receiving yards set a new Big Ten Conference record. With 30 points on five touchdowns, Mann was also the second-leading scorer on the 1946 Michigan team, trailing only placekicker Jim Brieske. He had gained 114 yards on nine end-around runs in 1946, earning him a nickname as the "fifth man" in behind Michigan's four primary ball-carriers.

As a senior, Mann started seven games at left end on Crisler's undefeated 1947 Michigan team. He caught 12 passes for 302 yards and three touchdowns, and also ran for 129 yards on 15 end-around plays. On October 4, against Stanford, Mann caught a 61-yard touchdown pass from Bob Chappuis on Michigan's second play of the game. Against Pitt the following week, he caught three passes for 105 yards and two touchdowns, including a 70-yard scoring play on a pass from Chappuis.

After the 1947 season, Mann and fellow Michigan end Len Ford played in the East–West college all-star game at Gilmore Stadium in Los Angeles; both caught touchdown passes in the game. Mann was also selected by the Associated Press as a first-team end for its All-Big Nine team. He was also chosen as a second-team All-American by the Associated Press and the Football Writers Association of America. Michigan coach Crisler called him "the greatest pass receiver he has ever coached". In 2016, Mann was posthumously inducted into the Michigan Sports Hall of Fame.

== Professional football ==
=== Detroit Lions ===
In February 1948, Mann traveled to New York and met with New York Yankees coach Ray Flaherty. Mann said at the time that he would like to play for the Yankees, but was reluctant to agree to any terms as he was expecting to receive interest from several other teams in the All-America Football Conference (AAFC) and National Football League (NFL). In April 1948, Mann signed with the Detroit Lions of the NFL; his first contract was for $7,500. He was also hired to a sales position at the Goebel Brewing Company, which was owned by Lions' president Edwin J. Anderson. At the time, Detroit's new head coach Bo McMillin said, "We're tickled to get Mann. We've been after his name on a Detroit contract ever since I came here as a coach. We know he will be a valuable professional performer".

==== 1948 season ====
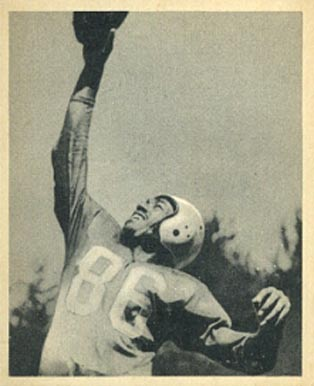
Mann's 1948 Bowman football card

As a rookie in 1948, Mann and halfback Mel Groomes became the first African Americans to play for the Lions. Even though team owners claimed that a ban on African American players did not exist, between 1933 and 1945 no African American played in the NFL. Teams in the rival AAFC were much more willing to sign African American players. Even after the NFL began signing African American players to their rosters, it took many years for them to be given the same opportunities as white players.

Mann appeared in all 12 games for the Lions in the 1948 season, though none as a starter. Despite his role as a backup, Mann finished the season with 33 catches for 560 yards, ranking him seventh in the NFL in receiving yards and fourth in yards per reception. The Lions would finish the year with a record of 2–10, putting them in last place in the Western Division. In December 1948, Mann joined Jesse Owens' Olympians professional basketball team in Cleveland. Mann had played two years of college basketball at Hampton Institute.

==== 1949 season ====
In the preseason before the 1949 season, the Lions played an exhibition game against the Philadelphia Eagles in New Orleans. Coach McMillin met with the Lions' African American players, including Mann, and explained that due to racial issues, they would not be able to play in the game.

On December 11, 1949, Mann was credited with eight catches for 182 yards and two touchdowns (including a 64-yard touchdown pass from Frank Tripucka in the first quarter and a 41-yard touchdown pass in the fourth quarter) against the Green Bay Packers. After the game, Mann's wife, described as "an ardent football fan", told statistician Nick Kerbawy that her tally sheet showed that her husband caught nine passes. Kerbawy reexamined the play-by-play account and discovered she was right. The new total of nine receptions set a new Lions' record for a single game.

During the 1949 season, Mann led the NFL with 1,014 receiving yards. He also finished second in receptions with 66 (Tom Fears set an NFL record in 1949 with 77 receptions). At the time, Mann's season totals in receiving yards and receptions both ranked in the top five all-time. He also became the first Lions' player to eclipse 1,000 receiving yards in a season. Despite leading the NFL in receiving yards, Mann was not selected by the United Press (UP) for either its first- or second-team All-NFL team. Instead, he was named in its "Honorable Mention" team.

During the off-season in 1950, the Lions asked Mann to take a $1,500 pay cut from $7,500 to $6,000. According to the Lions, the pay cut request was based on the larger pool of available players and the merger of the AAFC and NFL before the start of the season. Mann objected and refused to sign a 1950 contract. Further complicating the negotiations, the African American community in Detroit had called for a boycott of Goebel beer after a bid by an African American group for a distributorship in Detroit's black community had been rejected. Mann recalled that Goebels/Lions president Anderson was under the mistaken impression that Mann had met with representatives of the boycott.

=== New York Yanks ===
On July 31, 1950, Mann became a holdout when he failed to show up on the first day of practice for the Lions. That same day, his position for Goebel was terminated. Four days later, he was sent to the New York Yanks in payment for quarterback Bobby Layne. The Lions had previously traded fullback Camp Wilson for Layne, but Wilson refused to report to the Yanks. Mann later recalled that Yanks' coach Red Strader was upset about the trade. Despite performing well during the team's training camp, Mann received little playing time in exhibition games. John Rauch, a rookie quarterback, told Mann that he had been ordered by coach Strader not to throw to him. Although it was unclear why he was not being thrown to, Mann understood the reason to be racially motivated. The day after Rauch threw a 50-yard touchdown pass to Mann in a pre-season game against the Washington Redskins, Mann was released by the Yanks. He was not picked up by any other team and officially became a free agent.

Through October 1950, Mann was jobless. At the end of the month, Mann publicly charged that he had been "railroaded" out of professional football. After he objected to the Lions' proposed pay cut, he asserted that the NFL had taken a "hands off" policy toward him. Mann publicly stated, "I must have been blackballed – it just doesn't make sense that I'm suddenly not good enough to make a single team in the league". The Lions' response to Mann's charge was a statement that they felt he was too small in stature to be an effective blocker. Mann filed a lawsuit against the NFL based on his belief that NFL owners colluded to avoid signing him. Commissioner Bert Bell disagreed, even though he was familiar with the way that team owners had worked together to not sign black players over the previous decade.

=== Green Bay Packers ===
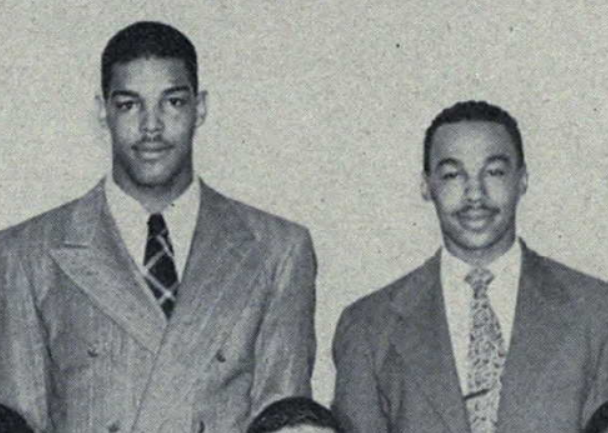
Mann (right) with Michigan teammate and future hall of famer Len Ford (left) in 1947. Both Mann and Ford later played for the Packers, although not at the same time.

==== 1950–1951 ====
Mann was signed by the Green Bay Packers on November 25, 1950, ending his suit against the NFL. On November 26, 1950, he appeared in the Packers' final home game against the San Francisco 49ers and became—at the time—the first known African American to play for the team in the regular season. African Americans Shag Thomas and Jim Clark had played in exhibition games for the Packers in 1950. Also, it was later determined that Walt Jean, a lineman for the Packers in the 1920s, was African American through his father's side of the family; this was not known by Jean's teammates at the time, thus the color barrier was officially broken for the Packers when Mann played his first game with the team. Mann ended up playing in three games for the Packers in the 1950 season, catching six passes for 89 yards and one touchdown.

In the 1951 season, Mann led the Packers with 50 catches, 696 receiving yards, and eight touchdowns; he also ranked fourth in the NFL in both receptions and receiving yards that year. Mann's best performance in 1951 came in an October game against the Philadelphia Eagles; he caught three touchdown passes while the Packers upset the favored Eagles. The Packers ended the season with a record of 3–9, the fourth straight season they won three or fewer games.

==== 1952–1955 ====
In the 1952 NFL draft, the Packers selected Rice University end Billy Howton with their second round pick. Howton, who elicited comparisons to Hall of Famer Don Hutson, made an immediate impact on the Packers, leading the league in the 1952 season with 1,231 receiving yards. Even with Howton in the lineup, Mann had a productive year, recording 30 receptions for 517 yards and six touchdowns. The Packers improved their record to 6–6, finishing fourth in their conference.

By the 1953 season, Mann and Howton were considered one of the best receiving duos in the league, though both players missed several games due to injury throughout the season. In ten games, Mann finished the year with 23 receptions for 327 yards and two touchdowns, all of which were second to Howton's totals for the season. Mann's best game in 1953 came in a 21–21 tie against the Chicago Bears; according to the Green Bay Press-Gazette, Mann "was open all afternoon as the Bears chased Howton" while catching six passes for 101 yards, including a 45-yard catch. The Packers ended the year in last place in their conference with a record of 2–9–1.

In the 1954 season, Mann played in only two of the Packers' first four games. In those two games, he did not record a catch. He had sustained a knee injury during a preseason game against the Philadelphia Eagles and was subsequently released by the team six weeks later in October. In November 1955, Mann filed a $25,000 breach of contract suit against the Packers. Mann claimed his release was illegal because he was not given written notice by the team. Mann and the Packers ultimately settled the lawsuit for an undisclosed amount in 1957. Mann's knee injury forced him to retire from professional football.

==== Race ====
When Mann joined the Packers, the city of Green Bay, Wisconsin, had fewer than 20 African American residents. Despite this lack of diversity, Mann's time with the Packers was largely free of overt racial incidents. Racial issues did arise when Mann traveled to other cities with the team. Green Bay Press-Gazette sports writer Art Daley recalled a story involving Mann and teammate Dick Afflis, who later became known in professional wrestling as "Dick the Bruiser". The Packers stayed at a Baltimore hotel that would not allow Mann to stay with the team on account of its policy prohibiting African-American guests. When Mann left to go to another hotel, the 252-pound (114 kg) Afflis left with him. When a cab driver told Afflis that he would not drive Mann because of his race, Afflis grabbed the driver by the shirt and said, "You will take him wherever he wants to go". Several white teammates reached out to Mann to welcome him after he signed with the Packers and coach Gene Ronzani gave him additional travel privileges to Milwaukee and Chicago. Overall, Mann enjoyed his time in Green Bay, saying "I never had any problems. Everyone treated me well".

==== Legacy ====
Mann compiled 109 catches for 1,629 yards and 17 touchdowns over his five seasons with the Packers. He was inducted into the Green Bay Packers Hall of Fame in 1988 in recognition of his contributions to the team. His impact was largely felt off the field though, the Detroit Free Press writing that Mann was a "pioneer" wherever he played football, breaking multiple color barriers and doing so in a "dignified and friendly manner" that showed his "strength and determination". Packers' team historian Cliff Christl noted that "Mann endured unimaginable obstacles just to gain [the] opportunity" to play professional football.

== Legal career and personal life ==
After retiring from football, Mann returned to Detroit where he worked in real estate sales for the next decade. Mann was married twice, his first marriage ending in divorce. He remarried in 1956 and with his wife Vera had two daughters, Marjorie and Marilyn. In 1966, at age 43, Mann enrolled in night school at Detroit College of Law. He graduated from law school in 1970 and worked as a criminal defense lawyer for over 30 years in Detroit, heading the firm of Robert Mann & Associates. Mann's law office was located a few blocks from the Detroit Lions' Ford Field. At the Lions' first regular season game at Ford Field on September 22, 2002, Mann was the Lions' honorary captain. He died on October 21, 2006, aged 82.
