= Mr. Fred L. Mandel Jr. House =

Historic house in Illinois, United States

- U.S. National Register of Historic Places
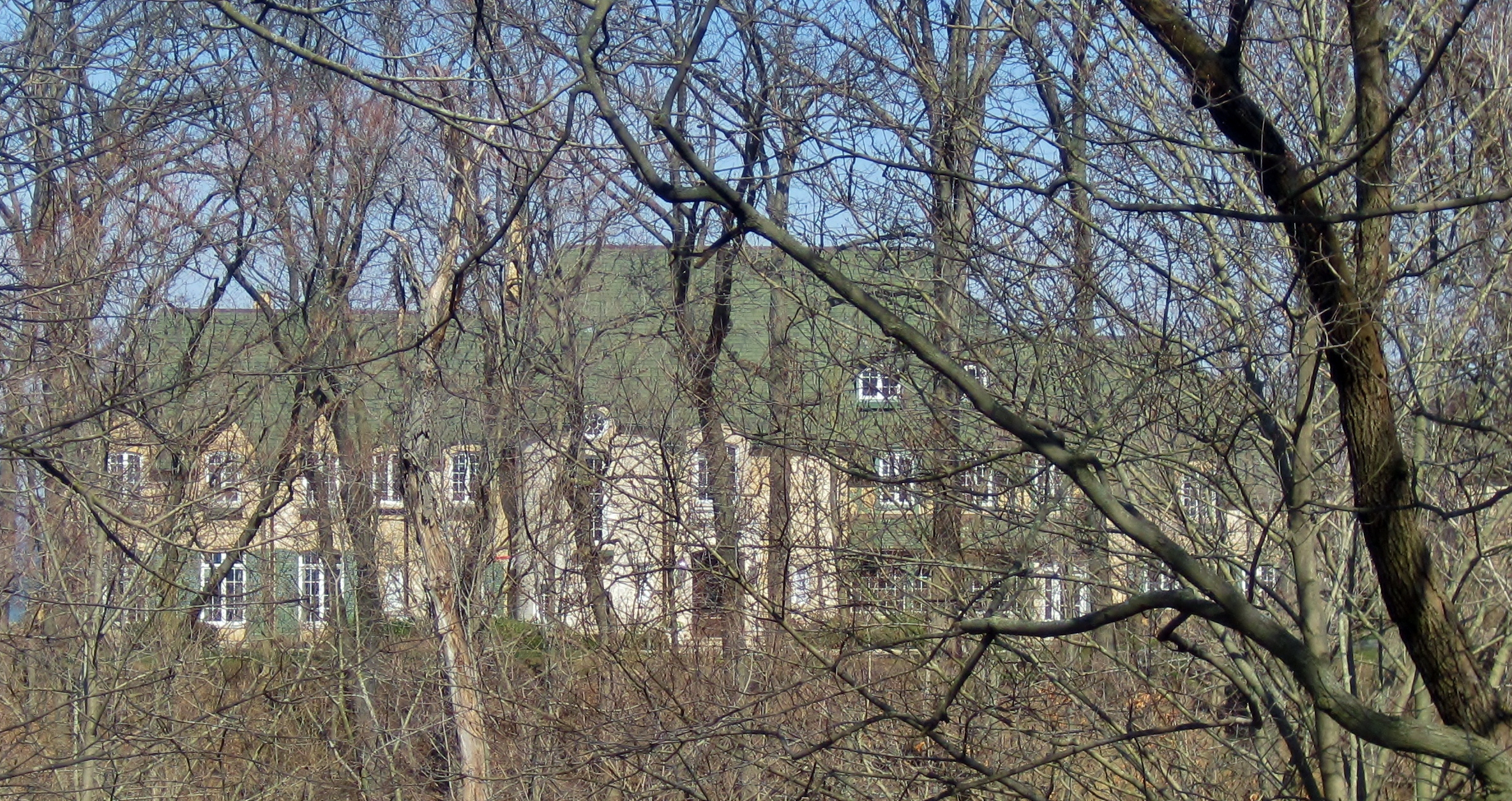

- Location within Illinois Location within the United States
- Location: 2479 Woodbridge Ln., Highland Park, Illinois
- Coordinates: 42°11′59″N 87°47′40″W
- Area: 3.3 acres (1.3 ha)
- Built: 1938
- Architect: Klafter, David Saul
- Architectural style: Late 19th And 20th Century Revivals, French Eclectic
- NRHP reference No.: 09001122
- Added to NRHP: December 22, 2009

The Mr. Fred L. Mandel Jr. House is a French Eclectic house in Highland Park, Illinois. Designed by David Saul Klafter, the house was built for a Mandel Brothers executive.

== History ==
The Fred L. Mandel Jr. House was built on five lots (and part of a sixth) in the Highland Park Syndicate Subdivision in Highland Park, Illinois. This area was platted on March 29, 1926, when it was owned by the Bard family. Francis N. Bard built a bridge across a ravine in September 1927, allowing development on the other side. Some time in the next eight years, the property was sold to their neighbors, the Buckley family. On July 30, 1937, Fred L. Mandel Jr. purchased these lots from Buckley. He contracted his father-in-law, architect David Saul Klafter, and contractor Joseph T. Carp to design a French Eclectic house for approximately $127,900.

Mandel was an executive at the Mandel Brothers Department Store, one of the most successful department stores in Chicago. He was the grandson of Leon Mandel, one of the namesake brothers. He was working at the store at the time, but soon would leave it to manage his investments full-time. He was also an owner of the Detroit Lions. Mandel and his wife Lois divorced on March 29, 1944, and they moved out. The house was purchased by Jules J. Reingold, the owner of the Moraine-on-the-Lake Hotel, in 1947.

The property was restored to its original condition in the late 2000s. It was recognized by the National Park Service for its architecture with a listing on the National Register of Historic Places on December 22, 2009.
