= Edwin J. Anderson =

American football executive (1920–1987)

- Anderson in the early 1960s

Personal information
- Born: August 3, 1902; Rockford, Illinois, U.S.
- Died: February 5, 1987 (aged 84); Bloomfield Hills, Michigan, U.S.

Career information
- College: Beloit College

Career history
- Detroit Lions (1948–1949) Vice president; Detroit Lions (1949–1960) President; Detroit Lions (1958–1966) General manager; Detroit Lions (1967–1987) Vice president

Awards and highlights
- 3× NFL champion (1952, 1953, 1957)

Edwin John Anderson (1902 – 1987) was an American businessman and sports executive who held various positions with the Detroit Lions of the National Football League (NFL) for nearly 40 years. Anderson is best remembered as the team's president from 1949 to 1960 and general manager from 1958 to 1966.

During Anderson's tenure as a top team executive the Lions won three World Championships — 1952, 1953, and 1957.

== Biography ==
=== Early life ===
Edwin J. Anderson was born August 3, 1902, in Rockford, Illinois.

He attended Beloit College, from which he graduated in 1927, and where he met his future wife, the former Isabel Bort. The pair were married at the end of March 1928 and initially made their home in Vincennes, Indiana, where Anderson worked as advertising manager of a newspaper.

=== Business career ===
The Andersons moved to Peoria, Illinois, in 1931 after Anderson became an advertising manager for Altorfer Bros. Company. In 1937, Anderson became the general sales manager for James Barclay and Company.

The following year he joined the Goebel Brewing Company as vice president and general sales manager. He was promoted to president of Goebel Brewing in 1941, still only 38 years old, and remained in that role until 1958 when he resigned to focus on his duties with the Lions.

Active in volunteer work, Anderson was the chairman of the 1945 Detroit Community Fund and president of the Children's Hospital of Detroit for three years. He was also a member of the board of directors of Lumberman's Mutual Casualty Company and the American Motorist Insurance Company.

=== Detroit Lions ===
Anderson was a member of the Detroit Football Company – a group of more than 140 Detroit business leaders led by D. Lyle Fife that purchased the money-losing Lions from Fred L. Mandel Jr. on January 16, 1948. Fife resigned as president during the 1949 season and Anderson was chosen to succeed him. Under Anderson's leadership, the Lions' financial fortunes were turned around, with the team making money for the first time in 1951. The team would go on to win three NFL championships and four division titles before falling off after the 1957 season.

In 1958, Anderson assumed the role of general manager after Nick Kerbawy left to take the same job with the Detroit Pistons of National Basketball Association.

In 1960, Anderson lobbied to become Commissioner of the National Football League, but Detroit's representative at the owner's meeting, D. Lyle Fife, refused to vote for him. In 1961, Anderson resigned as president after a group of Football Company stockholders, led by Fife, attempted to remove him. William Clay Ford Sr., an Anderson supporter, was selected to take the wheel as president, with Anderson allowed to remain as general manager. This internal struggle ended in 1963 when Ford purchased the team from the other shareholders.

In 1964, Russ Thomas took over football operations for the Lions, with Anderson remaining with the team as a vice president.

Although effectively out of power with the Lions after 1972, Anderson was a leading force advocating for the team's move from Tiger Stadium to the Pontiac Silverdome in 1975.

=== Death and legacy ===
Anderson remained with the Lions until his death on February 5, 1987.

After his death, Anderson was eulogized in print by Detroit sportswriter George Puskas, who recalled: "Good ol' Andy — few really understood him; fewer still bothered to try. At one and the same time, he was the most successful and most criticized sports boss Detroit has produced. He seemed to invite it. He had an aristocratic bearing in a blue-collar town and it was his lot — his job — to be blamed for everything and credited for little, even as his team won three world championships in six years, in 1952, '53, and '57. Fans loved to hate him. So did some of his players."
