= Nick Kerbawy =

American sports executive (1912–1990)

- Born: August 1912; Blissfield, Michigan, U.S.
- Died: June 7, 1990 (aged 77)
- Education: Hillsdale College
- Occupation: Sports executive
- Years active: 1944–1988
- Employer(s): Michigan State Spartans (1944–1948); Detroit Lions (1948–1958); Michigan Sports Hall of Fame (1954–1988); Detroit Pistons (1958–1961)
- Awards: 3× NFL champion (1952, 1953, 1957); Michigan Sports Hall of Fame (1985)

William Nicholas Kerbawy (August 1912 – June 7, 1990) was an American sports executive. He served as the general manager of the Detroit Lions from 1951 to 1958 and of the Detroit Pistons from 1958 to 1961. He won three NFL championships with the Lions. Kerbawy was also the founder and a commissioner of the Michigan Sports Hall of Fame, and was inducted into the hall in 1985.

== Biography ==
Kerbawy was born in August 1912, (Note: In a 1944 article for the Battle Creek Enquirer, Kerbawy wrote that he celebrated his birthday "during the second week of August." As he was 77 when he died in June 1990, according to an obituary and his Michigan Sports Hall of Fame profile, and was born in the month of August, he must have been born in 1912.) in Blissfield, Michigan, and graduated from Hillsdale College. He also attended Michigan Normal College (now known as Eastern Michigan University) where he won the 1935 tennis championship, although he did not receive the trophy until 1949. After graduating from college, Kerbawy taught Spanish and journalism at Hillsdale and operated a news bureau there. He also served as a correspondent for the Battle Creek Enquirer and the Lansing State Journal and officiated several local basketball games. By 1944, he had become public relations director and director of sports publicity at Michigan State University (then known as the Michigan State College of Agriculture and Applied Science) and around that time (Note: Sources disagree on whether Kerbawy was named sports information director in 1944 or 1945.) was named the school's sports information director. He accepted these posts mainly because he was also named an assistant professor at the school. Kerbawy additionally served as the editor of the Michigan State Spartans Sport Service, being described as the "energetic Michigan State publicist."

In February 1946, Kerbawy was appointed a member of the American Associated of College Baseball Coaches Publicity committee. In 1948, after serving four years with Michigan State, Kerbawy left to become public relations director of the Detroit Lions of the National Football League (NFL), after being persuaded by the Lions' coach Bo McMillin. He also became the Lions' publicist, "tak[ing] over the job, house and furniture of Fred DeLano", the prior person in the position, according to The Index-Journal. In the middle of 1948, Kerbawy was named the college sports publicity "Man of the Year".

In the following two seasons, Kerbawy also gained the positions of assistant general manager and business manager. After McMillin was fired during the 1951 season, Kerbawy was promoted to general manager. (Note: Sources disagree on the year Kerbawy gained the general manager position from McMillin: His Michigan Sports Hall of Fame profile states 1952, as does an article on him in WRKR. However, McMillin was fired in the 1951 season and articles as early as 1951 name Kerbawy as general manager. His obituary in the Detroit Free Press mentions him as being general manager in 1950, however, this cannot be true because Kerbawy was named general manager immediately after McMillin's firing and the latter was still on the team that year.) Kerbawy and the Lions' coach Buddy Parker were responsible for building one of the NFL's best teams in the 1950s. In recent years the team had finished as bad as 2–10, but in Kerbawy's first year as general manager, he helped them compile a record of 7–4–1 and in the next year, he took them all the way to the league championship game, which they won 17–7 over the Cleveland Browns. It was the first time Detroit had won the championship in 17 years and the second time overall.

The next year, the Lions compiled a 10–2 record and made the championship again, where they faced the Cleveland Browns and won on a touchdown pass in the final quarter, 17–16. It was their second consecutive league title, which was the only time the Lions ever accomplished this. Detroit lost in the conference championship game in 1954, but declined in the next year and only won three games, which Kerbawy attributed to their lack of high draft picks. However, Kerbawy helped build the Lions back up in the next season; the team won nine games and placed second in their conference, narrowly missing the playoffs by a half-game. In 1957, Detroit won their fourth league championship, over the Cleveland Browns, which remains the last time the Lions were NFL champions.

After serving part of the 1958 season with the Lions, Kerbawy was convinced by Detroit Pistons owner Fred Zollner to leave the team and become director, vice president, and general manager of the Pistons in the National Basketball Association (NBA). He was also made a director at Zollner Corp., with a contract of $50,000 a year for all his positions. Edwin J. Anderson was named Kerbawy's successor with the Lions. Kerbawy's contract with the Pistons totaled $1,000,000 and was 20 years long. At a press conference after the hiring, Zollner said that Kerbawy's job "should be the only position he will need the rest of his life." However, friction grew between the two, and Kerbawy was fired from his positions in January 1961 after just three seasons. Midway into the 1960–61 season, Zollner had received reports stating that Kerbawy had "drifted afield and had involved himself in a proxy fight between two factions of Lion stockholders." The reports stated that he had been soliciting proxies in opposition to a faction which included William Clay Ford, who was purchasing lots of the Pistons. Zollner told Kerbawy to have a leave of absence for six months, with pay. Kerbawy collected the pay for six months and subsequently sued Zollner for "impeaching his reputation." Originally suing for $5,500,000, he eventually settled for $255,000 three years later. For his time as the general manager of Detroit, Kerbawy had made $600,000.

After his time with the Pistons, Kerbawy "kept in touch" with sports, attending many of the top games and serving as the commissioner of the Michigan Sports Hall of Fame, which he had helped create in 1954. He was also hired several times to advise the creation of sports halls of fame. Kerbawy was inducted into the Michigan Sports Hall of Fame in 1985. He resigned from his position as commissioner in 1988, after receiving heavy criticism for inducting a golfer to the hall who had received fewer votes than several others. He died two years later of cancer on June 7, 1990, at the age of 77.
