= Detroit Football Company =

American sports syndicate (1947–1964)

- Founded: December 26, 1947
- Defunct: January 10, 1964
- Fate: Dissolved
- Key people: D. Lyle Fife; Edwin J. Anderson; William Clay Ford Sr.

The Detroit Football Company was an American syndicate which owned the Detroit Lions of the National Football League (NFL) from 1948 to 1964.

On January 15, 1948, the NFL owners unanimously approved the sale of the Lions from Fred L. Mandel Jr. to a seven-person syndicate. The original members were

- D. Lyle Fife, owner of an electrical supply company
- Edwin J. Anderson, president of the Goebel Brewing Company
- William D. Downey, president of the Kinsel Drug Co.
- Charles T. Fisher Jr., bank president
- Walter Briggs Jr., son of Detroit Tigers owner Walter Briggs Sr.
- Arthur Hoffman, pharmaceutical executive
- Harry Wismer, sports announcer

Attorney Philip Hart helped negotiate the sale and was given the title of assistant secretary-treasurer, but held no stock.

Fife became team president and pledged that the syndicate would invest around $300,000 in the team, which had been in debt under Mandel's ownership. He also stated that the group planned to add more members and hoped to operate like Green Bay Packers, Inc. C. Ray Davisson, George Cavanaugh, William Clay Ford Sr., and Ralph Wilson were among the stockholders who later joined the company.

In December 1949, Fife resigned as president for "personal reasons". According to Sports Illustrated writer Tex Maule, Fife had "filed for divorce from his wife of 33 years" and "intended to, and eventually did, marry his secretary". The Lions board of directors "did not relish that kind of publicity", leading to Fife's departure. Anderson took over as president and over the next seven seasons, the Lions won three NFL championships and four division titles.

In 1961, a group of stockholders led by Fife attempted to remove Anderson as team president. Anderson resigned and one of his supporters, William Clay Ford Sr., was chosen to succeed him. Anderson was allowed to stay on as general manager.

On November 22, 1963, 135 of the team's 144 stockholders voted to sell the team to Ford for $6 million. The deal was closed on January 10, 1964, and the Detroit Football Company was dissolved.

Sporting positions
Preceded by Fred L. Mandel Jr.	Detroit Lions principal owner 1948–1964	Succeeded by William Clay Ford Sr.
