= Rod Wood =

American football executive (born c. 1957)

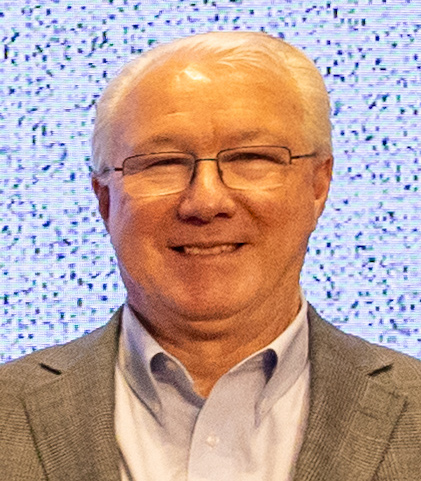
- Wood in 2025
- Born: 1960 or 1961 (age 65–66)
- Education: University of Michigan-Flint; ABA Graduate School of Commercial Banking
- Occupation: Businessman
- Known for: President of the Detroit Lions

Rod Wood is an American businessman and football executive who is the president of the Detroit Lions of the National Football League (NFL).

== Professional career ==
Previous to being hired as the president of the Detroit Lions, Wood was a close associate of the Ford family that owns the team, and worked as the president and CEO of the Ford Estates.

=== Detroit Lions ===
Wood was signed with the Detroit Lions as a team president on November 19, 2015. Wood attended University of Michigan-Flint and the ABA Graduate School of Commercial Banking. On accepting the appointment, Wood stated that he was "not qualified to run any other NFL team", a statement that led some critics of his hiring to label him as unqualified for the job of running the Lions. Wood has refused to give up the Lions's traditional Thanksgiving game despite pressure from other NFL teams. Under Wood's leadership and direction, the Lions and the City of Detroit hosted the 2024 NFL draft.

On February 18, 2026, Wood announced his intentions to retire prior to the 2026 NFL season.

=== Stadium upgrade ===
In February 2017, Wood unveiled plans for the first major renovation to the Detroit Lions’ home stadium, Ford Field, since it opened in 2002. The $100 million investment incorporated a complete overhaul of the audio and visual experience that features new videoboards as well as a new state-of-the-art sound system. The stadium’s premium spaces also received a complete makeover with expanded offerings to fans. Wood has also discussed adding a retractable roof to the field to attract MLS teams to play there. An entire new playing surface was installed at Ford Field in spring 2023.
