= Fred L. Mandel Jr. =

American businessman (1908–1973)

Frederick Leon Mandel Jr. (1908–1973) was an American businessman who owned the Detroit Lions of the National Football League (NFL) from 1940 to 1947.

== Early life ==
Mandel was the grandson of one of the founders of the Mandel Brothers Department Store. He graduated from York High School and Notre Dame University. He contracted polio on a trip to China and was confined to an iron lung for a period of time. In 1931, Mandel and his brother Leon Mandel II sponsored an expedition led by ornithologist Ernest G. Holt which collected 803 birds, 96 reptiles, and 37 mammals from the Orinoco Delta for the Field Museum of Natural History.

== Business ==
Mandel was an executive in his family's department store and in 1934 was elected to the company's board of directors. In 1940, he purchased the Detroit Lions from George A. Richards for $200,000. He was the NFL's first Jewish owner. The 1940s saw the Lions win only 35 games. The low point was when they went 0–11 in 1942. The 1942 team was so bad that they only scored five touchdowns all season, were shut out five times, and never scored more than seven points in a single game. On January 15, 1948, Mandel sold the team to a seven-person syndicate.

== Personal life ==
On March 14, 1935, Mandel married Lois Klafter. They had one son, Stephen. In 1938 the Mandels moved to a French Eclectic house in Highland Park, Illinois, designed by Lois's father, David Saul Klafter. The home, known as the Mr. Fred L. Mandel Jr. House, was added to the National Register of Historic Places on December 22, 2009. The couple divorced in 1944.

== Later life ==
In 1960, Mandel Brothers was sold to Wieboldt's. Mandel and his second wife, Edna, moved to Honolulu, where he operated the Hawaii Stamp & Coin Shop. In 1967, Mandel sold a Hawaiian Missionary at auction for $17,000. Mandel died in 1973.
