= Goebel Brewing Company =

Detroit brewer

Goebel Brewing Company was a brewing company in Detroit, Michigan from 1873 to 1964, eventually acquired by Stroh Brewery Company.

== History ==
In 1839, August Goebel Sr. was born in Münstermaifeld Rhenish, Prussia. During the Civil War, Goebel enlisted in the Union Army's 2nd Michigan Infantry Regiment and fought at Bull Run.

In 1873, after the Civil War, August Goebel, Sr. and Theodore Gorenflo founded A. Goebel & Co., and by the 1880s, Goebel was Detroit's third largest brewery.

The beer was locally popular in Detroit from the company's inception, but grew in popularity and was eventually available in many states for a brief period in the 1940s, with an ad campaign in Life magazine that featured restaurant ads from many famous eateries around the country using Goebel beer as an ingredient. The beer, billed as a "light lager", was golden in color, and was noticeably drier than most everyday beers of the era.

Their longtime mascot was a "thunder eagle", but, when World War II arrived, it resembled a Nazi symbol, by the 1950s, the Goebel mascot became a bantam, called Brewster Rooster, who wore attire with Goebel's logo, and the beer was a long-time sponsor of Detroit Tigers baseball broadcasts on radio.

Prohibition forced the closure of the brewery in 1920 though the space was rented out to various industries. In 1932 the company was reorganized. Though Prohibition was repealed in 1933 the brewery would not begin new production until the Spring of 1934. Otto Rosenbusch, the retired brewmaster from Stroh Brewery Company, was brought on to help Goebel compete against his old employer at Stroh's and his son Herman who was the head brewer there. Upon the elder Rosenbusch's passing in 1935, Charles Elich, the brewmaster at the Pabst Brewing Company agreed to become both the brewmaster and superintendent at Goebel.

== A new unpasteurized technique ==
In the mid 1960s, Goebel began advertising that their beer was "real" (unpasteurized) draft beer. Normally, bottled and canned beer had to be pasteurized to kill the active yeast left in the beer after brewing was completed, otherwise the buildup of gasses in the bottle would explode them on store shelves or ruin the taste of the beer even if the bottles stayed intact. This does not affect draft beer, which is kept at refrigerator temperatures from brewery to tap. Goebel's method of achieving this was a bacterium cultivated by the company's chemists that acted specifically on the yeast in the beer, then died harmlessly when the yeast was all consumed. Sales spiked, as people liked the "draft-like" flavor of the beer, but the technique was short-lived, as the bacteria became prevalent everywhere in the brewery, affecting other aspects of the brewing process negatively, and it had to be discontinued. The beer never regained its previous popularity after that point, exacerbated by the gradual changing of tastes in a new generation of beer drinkers who preferred a lighter, sweeter beer. Comedian George Gobel became a spokesman for Goebel Beer for obvious reasons.

== Low-priced years ==
Goebel was popular in its latter days in the 1970s and 1980s, as a low-priced beer, sold by the case in bottles and aluminum cans. In the mid to late seventies, a case of twenty four bottles cost $4.44 not including the dollar refund when all empties were returned. Eventually, Pabst Brewing Company acquired Stroh's and their other brands (including Goebel), and discontinued the Goebel brand at the end of 2005.

== Legacy ==
In the John Bellairs book The Trolley to Yesterday and its eventual sequel The Wrath of the Grinning Ghost, the character of Brewster (really Horus, a god of Upper and Lower Egypt) is given his name because he bears a resemblance to Brewster Rooster.

Seen in White Noise (2022).

== See also ==
- List of defunct breweries in the United States
