= Detroit Lions =

NFL team in Detroit, Michigan

- Current season
Logo	Wordmark
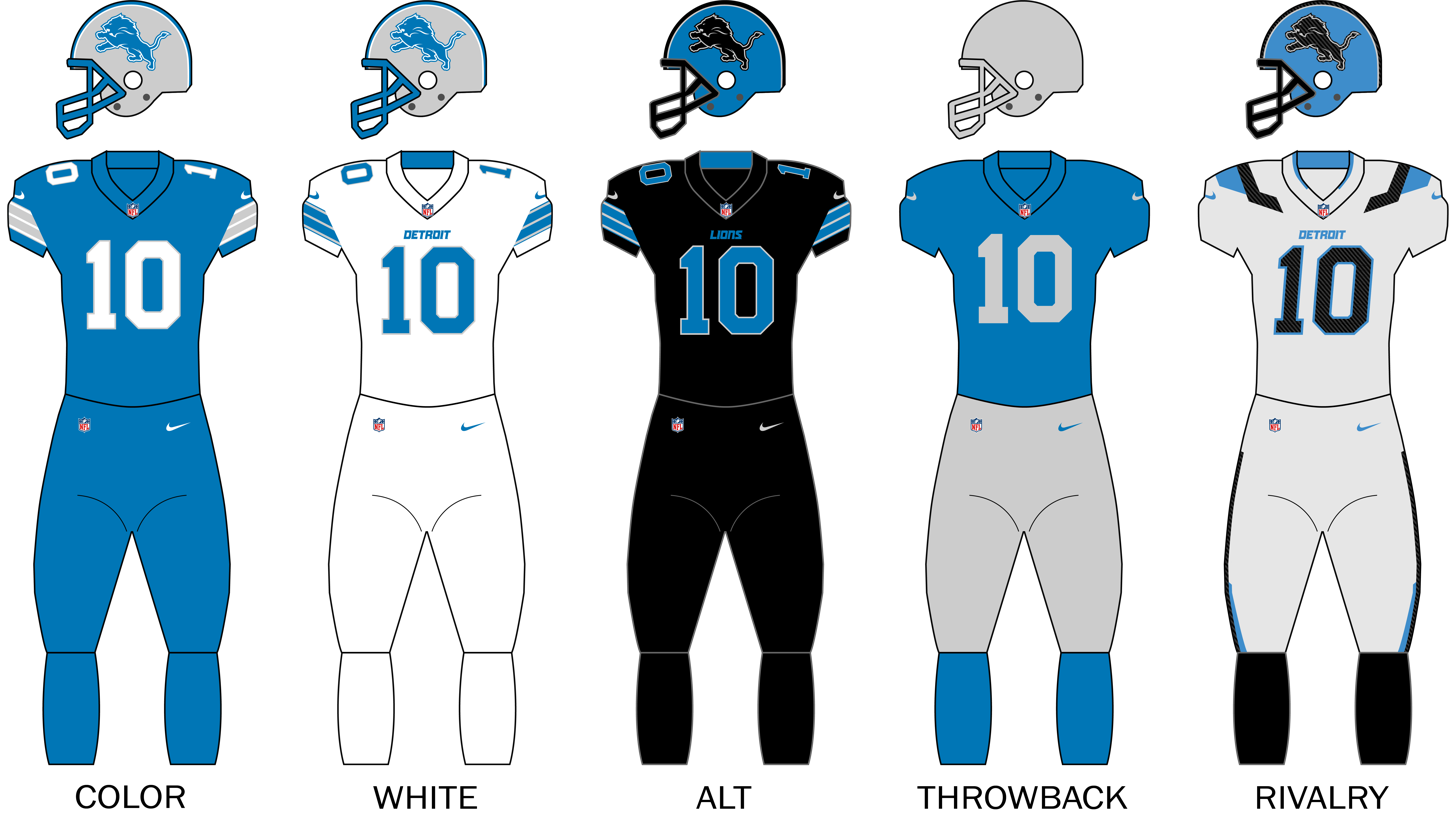
- Uniforms

General information
- Founded: 1928; 98 years ago
- Stadium: Ford Field; Detroit, Michigan
- Headquartered: Meijer Performance Center; Allen Park, Michigan
- Colors: Honolulu blue, silver, white, black
- Fight song: Gridiron Heroes
- Mascot: Roary the Lion
- Website: detroitlions.com

Personnel
- Owner: Sheila Ford Hamp
- General manager: Brad Holmes
- Head coach: Dan Campbell
- President: Richard Haddad

Team history
- Portsmouth Spartans (1928–1933); Detroit Lions (1934–present)

Home fields
- Universal Stadium (1930–1933); University of Detroit Stadium (1934–1937, 1940); Tiger Stadium (1938–1939, 1941–1974); Pontiac Silverdome (1975–2001); Ford Field (2002–present)

League / conference affiliations
- Independent (1928–1929) National Football League (1930–present): Western Division (1933–1949); National Conference (1950–1952); Western Conference (1953–1969); Central Division (1967–1969); National Football Conference (1970–present); NFC Central (1970–2001); NFC North (2002–present)

Championships
- League championships: 4: NFL championships (pre–1970 AFL–NFL merger) (4) 1935, 1952, 1953, 1957
- Conference championships: 4: NFL National: 1952; NFL Western: 1953, 1954, 1957
- Division championships: 6: NFL Western: 1935; NFC Central: 1983, 1991, 1993; NFC North: 2023, 2024

Playoff appearances (20)
- NFL: 1932, 1935, 1952, 1953, 1954, 1957, 1970, 1982, 1983, 1991, 1993, 1994, 1995, 1997, 1999, 2011, 2014, 2016, 2023, 2024

Owners
- Harry N. Snyder (1930–1934); George A. Richards (1934–1940); Fred L. Mandel Jr. (1940–1948); Detroit Football Company (1948–1964); William Clay Ford Sr. (1964–2014); Martha Firestone Ford (2014–2020); Sheila Ford Hamp (2020–present)

The Detroit Lions are a professional American football team based in Detroit. The Lions compete in the National Football League (NFL) as a member of the National Football Conference (NFC) North division. The team plays their home games at Ford Field in Downtown Detroit.

The franchise was founded in Portsmouth, Ohio, as the Portsmouth Spartans in 1928 and joined the NFL on July 12, 1930. Amid financial struggles, the franchise was relocated to Detroit in 1934 and renamed the Lions in reference to the city's Major League Baseball (MLB) franchise, the Detroit Tigers.

The Lions won four NFL Championship Games between 1935 and 1957. Following the 1957 championship, the franchise did not win a playoff game until the 1991 season and did not win another until the 2023 season. They are the only franchise operational for the entirety of the Super Bowl era to not appear in a Super Bowl.

== Logos and uniforms ==
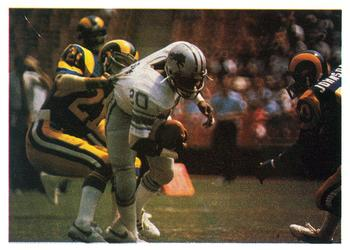
Billy Sims (No. 20) rushing the ball against the Los Angeles Rams on September 7, 1980

Aside from a brief change to scarlet and black from 1948 to 1950 instituted by then head coach Bo McMillin, which was influenced by his years as coach at Indiana, the Lions' uniforms have basically remained the same since they moved to Detroit in 1934–silver helmets, silver pants, and either blue or white jerseys.

Glenn Presnell, the then last surviving member of the 1934 Lions, recalled that after the Portsmouth Spartans relocated to Detroit, team owner George A. Richards asked him and his wife to pick the Lions' colors from combinations that included red and white, orange and black, and blue and silver. The Presnells liked blue and silver the best, so Richards selected it. The blue used by the Lions is officially known as "Honolulu blue", which is inspired by the color of the waves off the coast of Hawaii.

There have been minor changes to the uniform design throughout the years, such as changing the silver stripe patterns on the jersey sleeves, and changing the colors of the jersey numbers. "TV numbers", which are auxiliary uniform numbers to help TV broadcasters identify players from the line of scrimmage, were added to the jersey sleeves in 1956. White trim was added to the logo in 1970, with outlines (white on the blue jersey, silver on the white jersey) added to the numbers in 1972; the color arrangement on the numbers on the blue jerseys was reversed in 1982. The silver facemasks became blue in 1984. In 1998, the team wore blue pants with their white jerseys along with gray socks but dropped that combination after the season. In 1999, the "TV numbers" on the sleeves were moved to the shoulders.

In 1994, every NFL team wore throwback jerseys, and the Lions' were similar to the jerseys worn during their 1935 championship season. The helmets and pants were solid silver, the jerseys Honolulu blue with silver numbers and the jersey did not have "TV numbers" on the sleeves. The team wore solid blue socks and black cleats. The helmets also did not have logos, as helmets were simple leather back then. The Lions also wore 1950s-style jerseys during their traditional Thanksgiving Day games from 2001 to 2004 as the NFL encouraged teams to wear throwback jerseys on Thanksgiving Day.

In 2003, the team added black trim to their logo and jerseys. The facemasks on the helmet changed from blue to black with the introduction of the new color. In 2005, the team introduced an alternate black jersey.

For 2008, the team dropped the black jersey in favor of a throwback uniform to commemorate the franchise's 75th anniversary. The throwback uniform became the team's permanent alternate jersey in 2009, replacing the former black alternate. The Lions officially unveiled a new logo and uniforms on April 20, 2009. The logo was given a flowing mane and fangs, while the typeface featured a modern font.

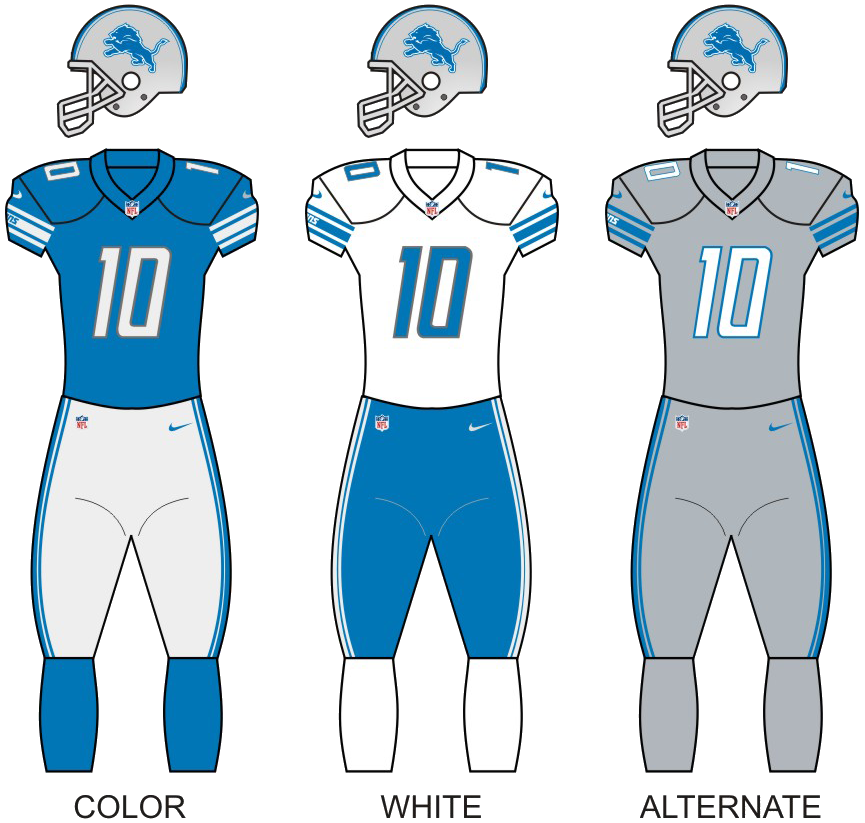
The Detroit Lions' uniform design from 2017 through 2023.

On February 1, 2017, the Lions announced a new typeface, logo, and the complete removal of the color black from the team identity. While the previous logo was retained, the border was changed from black to silver. The Lions then unveiled the new uniforms on April 13, 2017, which included the white jersey and blue pants combo for the first time since 1998. They introduced an alternate all-gray uniform, an alternate all-Honolulu blue uniform, and a helmet with a silver face mask. The Lions also added the initials "WCF" to the left sleeve as a permanent tribute to William Clay Ford, who owned the team from 1963 until his death in 2014. The sleeve addition replaced the black "WCF" patch on the left breast that was added after Ford's death.

On September 20, 2021, the Lions wore white pants with their road white uniforms against the Green Bay Packers. The white pants, which lacked striping, were previously worn during the "scarlet and black" era in the 1948 and 1949 seasons.

On April 12, 2023, the Lions announced they would celebrate their 90th season in franchise history during the 2023 season with a commemorative logo and jersey patch. The inspiration for the patch is an homage to their logo from 1961 to 1969, which is also honored in the WCF memorial logo and the 60th commemorative season logo. On June 21, 2023, the Lions unveiled an alternate blue helmet. The helmet, which features the 1960s logo, was paired with the gray uniform. This was the first time the Lions wore a blue helmet since 1955.

On April 18, 2024, the Lions unveiled a new jersey set. The home jersey, referred to as "One Pride", features a redefined Honolulu blue with white block numbers trimmed in silver and sleeves striped in silver with white accents. The home jersey is paired with silver pants with Honolulu blue stripes with white accents or solid Honolulu blue pants. The road white jersey, referred to as "the 313", features Honolulu blue block numbers, stripes trimmed in silver, and a Honolulu blue "Detroit" wordmark on the front. The road jersey is paired with solid Honolulu blue or solid white pants. The primary silver helmet with a Honolulu blue face mask and Honolulu blue stripes with white accents is worn with the home and road jerseys. The black alternate jersey, referred to as "Motor City Muscle", features Honolulu blue numbers and stripes trimmed in silver along with a "Lions" wordmark on the front. It is worn with the alternate Honolulu blue helmet featuring black stripes with silver accents and the leaping lion logo in black with silver accents. The black jersey is paired with solid black or solid Honolulu blue pants.

The black jersey was a favorite of head coach Dan Campbell, who wore the original version during his playing days. According to former Lions team president Rod Wood, it was Campbell who lobbied for the black jersey to return, which happened after the Lions won the NFC North division title in 2023. The throwback jersey was retained and updated with the refreshed Honolulu blue. The throwback jersey is paired with a silver helmet that is worn with a silver or a Honolulu blue face mask. The William Clay Ford (WCF) memorial decal has been placed on the back of the primary and alternate helmets.

Throughout the 2024 season, the silver pants were only worn once (a Week 2 defeat against the Tampa Bay Buccaneers), and the throwbacks were not worn at all. Instead, they mainly wore either the all-blue or all-white uniforms, with the Lions winning all of their regular season games in either combination. The throwback uniforms were initially scheduled to wear in Week 18 against the Minnesota Vikings, but the Lions decided to wear their all-black alternate uniforms instead. Detroit went 2–1 in the all-black uniforms.

On August 25, 2026, the Lions unveiled their Rivalries jersey. Referred to as "Defend the Den", the silver jersey features black italicized numbers, carbon-fiber decals, Honolulu blue and black shoulder stripes, and a "Detroit" wordmark on the front.

== Thanksgiving Day tradition ==
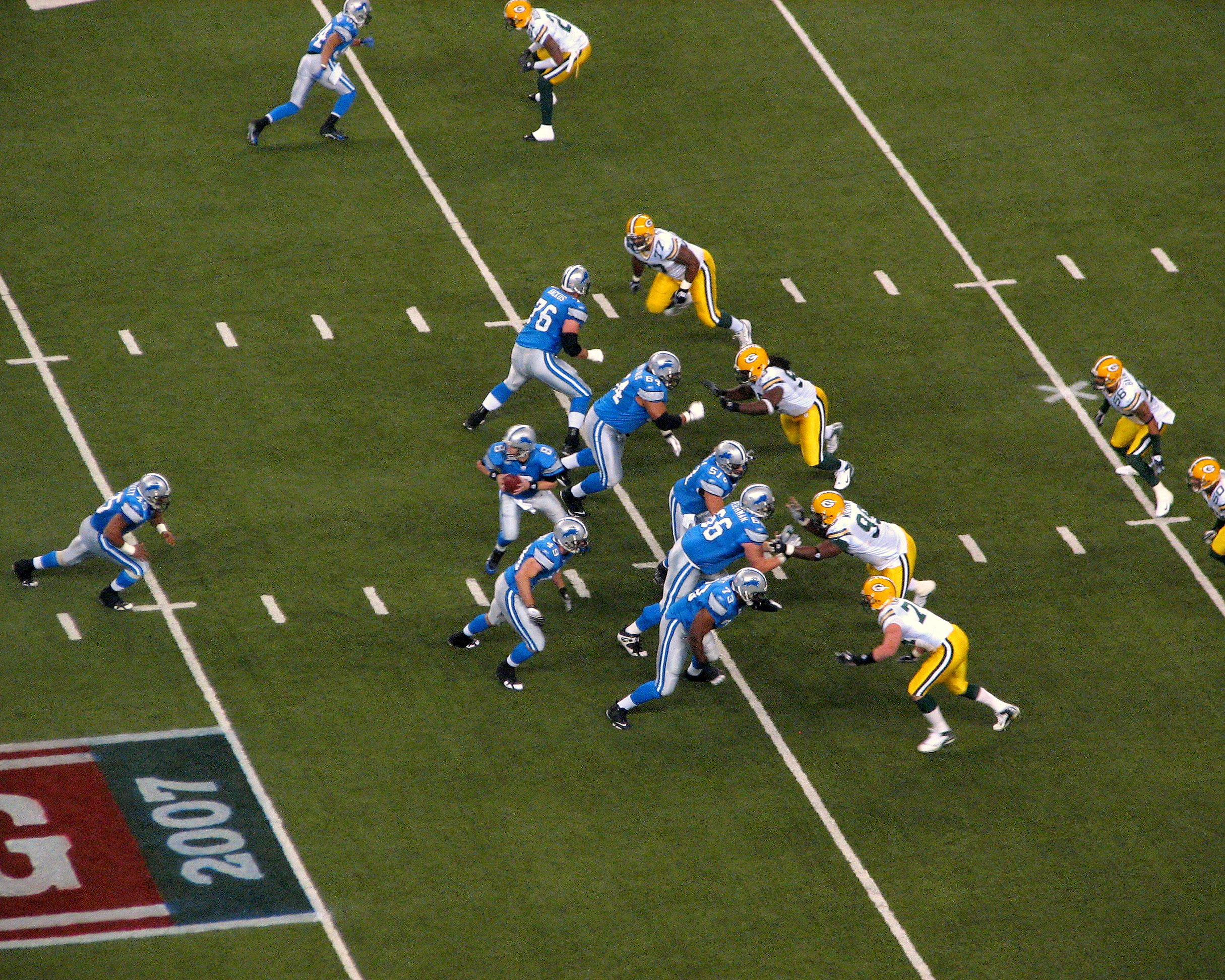
The Lions, seen here during the 2007 Thanksgiving game against their division rival Green Bay Packers, have played on Thanksgiving since 1934 with the exception of the years during World War II.

In 1934, then team owner George A. Richards, who also was the owner of a major radio affiliate of the NBC Blue Network, WJR in Detroit, the forerunner to today's ABC, negotiated an agreement with NBC to carry his Thanksgiving game live across all of the network's stations. Excluding the years of 1939–1944, due to World War II, the Lions have played on Thanksgiving ever since.

== Current roster and former players of note ==
=== Current roster ===
Detroit Lions roster
**Quarterbacks (QB)**: 11 Joshua Dobbs; 16 Jared Goff; **Running backs (RB)**: 0 Jahmyr Gibbs; 25 Jacob Saylors KR; 33 Sione Vaki; **Wide receivers (WR)**: 86 DeAndre Carter RS; 17 Tay Martin; 14 Amon-Ra St. Brown; 18 Isaac TeSlaa; 1 Jameson Williams; **Tight ends (TE)**: 83 Tyler Conklin; 87 Sam LaPorta; 89 Brock Wright FB	**Offensive linemen (OL)**: 79 Larry Borom T; 71 Miles Frazier G; 73 Christian Mahogany G; 65 Seth McLaughlin C; 76 Blake Miller T; 69 Tate Ratledge G; 70 Juice Scruggs C; 58 Penei Sewell T; **Defensive linemen (DL)**: 50 Skyler Gill-Howard DT; 99 Ahmed Hassanein ED; 93 Tyler Lacy ED; 54 Alim McNeill DT; 8 Derrick Moore ED; 66 Eric O'Neill ED; 95 Levi Onwuzurike DT; 91 Tyleik Williams DT; 94 Mekhi Wingo DT; 98 D. J. Wonnum ED	**Linebackers (LB)**: 35 Joe Bachie; 55 Derrick Barnes; 40 K. J. Britt; 53 Trevor Nowaske; 57 Amen Ogbongbemiga; 44 Malcolm Rodriguez; 90 Tyrus Wheat; **Defensive backs (DB)**: 6 Keith Abney II CB/S; 32 Brian Branch SS; 28 Andre Cisco FS; 36 Chuck Clark S; 30 Khalil Dorsey CB; 5 Christian Izien S; 31 Kerby Joseph FS; 21 Roger McCreary CB; 2 Ennis Rakestraw Jr. CB; 4 D. J. Reed CB; 38 Nick Whiteside CB; 23 Rock Ya-Sin CB; **Special teams (ST)**: 39 Jake Bates K; 3 Jack Fox P; 49 Hogan Hatten LS	**Practice squad**: 15 Luke Altmyer QB; 24 Aamaris Brown CB; 27 Myles Bryant S; 77 Devin Cochran T; 82 Thomas Gordon TE; 9 Lucky Jackson WR; 72 Aidan Keanaaina DT; 84 Miles Kitselman TE; 67 Elijah Klein G; 19 Dominic Lovett WR; 61 Anthony Lucas ED; 60 Jeffrey M'Ba DT (IPP); 13 Jackson Meeks TE; 51 Owen Pappoe LB; 26 Jabari Small RB; 74 Taki Taimani DT; **Reserve**: 78 Ben Bartch G (IR); 46 Jack Campbell LB (IR); 11 Damone Clark MLB (IR); 12 Thomas Harper S (IR); 97 Aidan Hutchinson ED (IR); 85 Tom Kennedy WR (IR); 88 Kendrick Law WR (IR); 29 Avonte Maddox S (IR); 59 Giovanni Manu T (NF-Inj.); 64 Cade Mays C (IR); 63 Mason Miller G (PS/I); 10 Isiah Pacheco RB (IR); 41 Jimmy Rolder LB (IR); 92 Payton Turner ED (IR); 45 Devin White LB (IR) 53 active, 15 practice squad (1 IPP), 15 reserve As of November 21, 2026. Rookies in italics.; Roster; Depth chart; Transactions

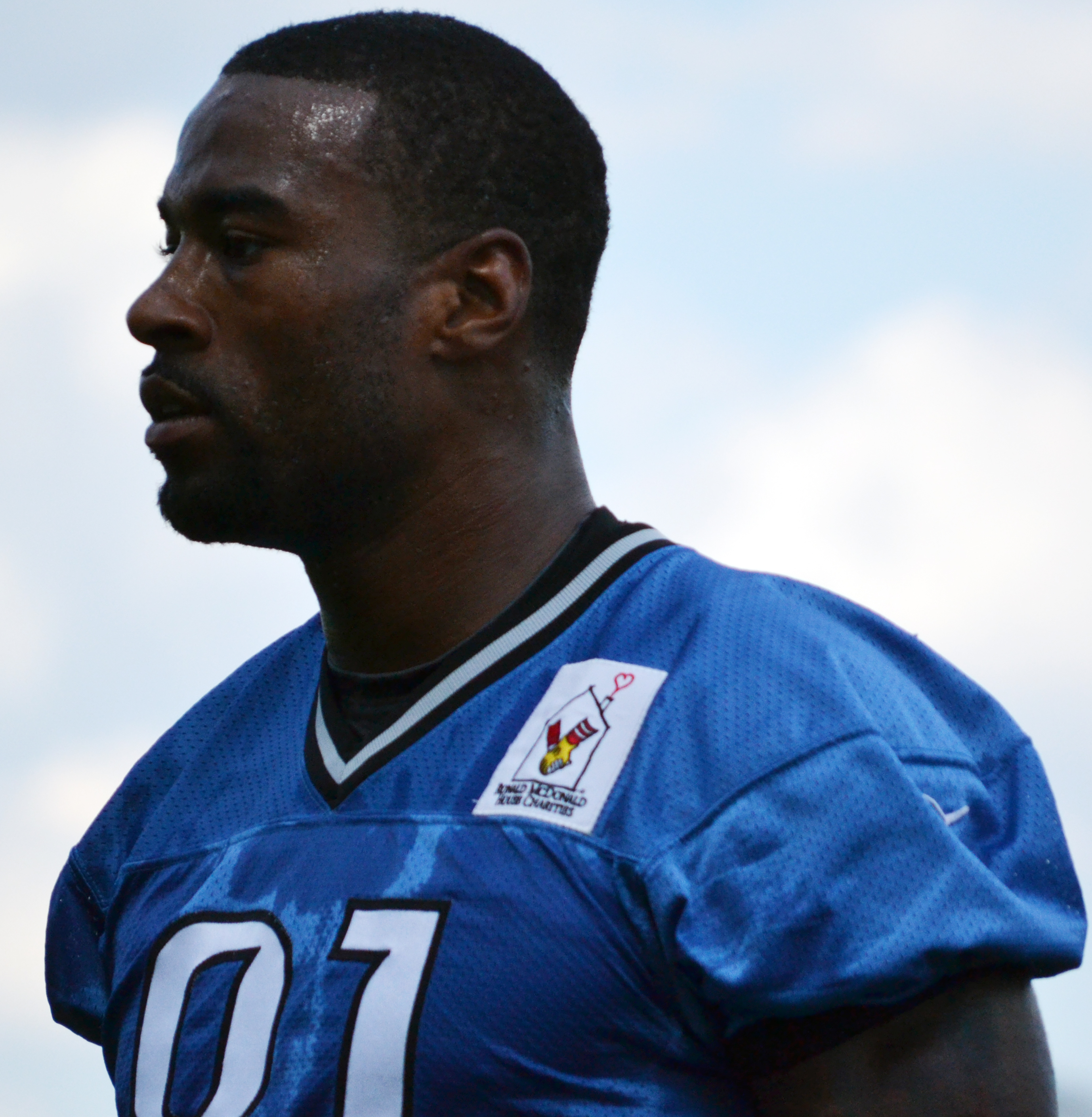
Calvin Johnson

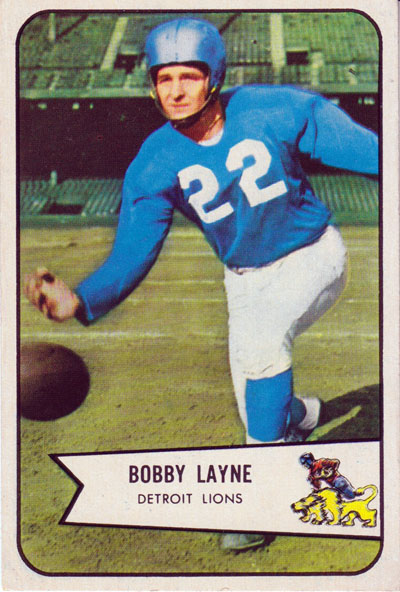
Bobby Layne

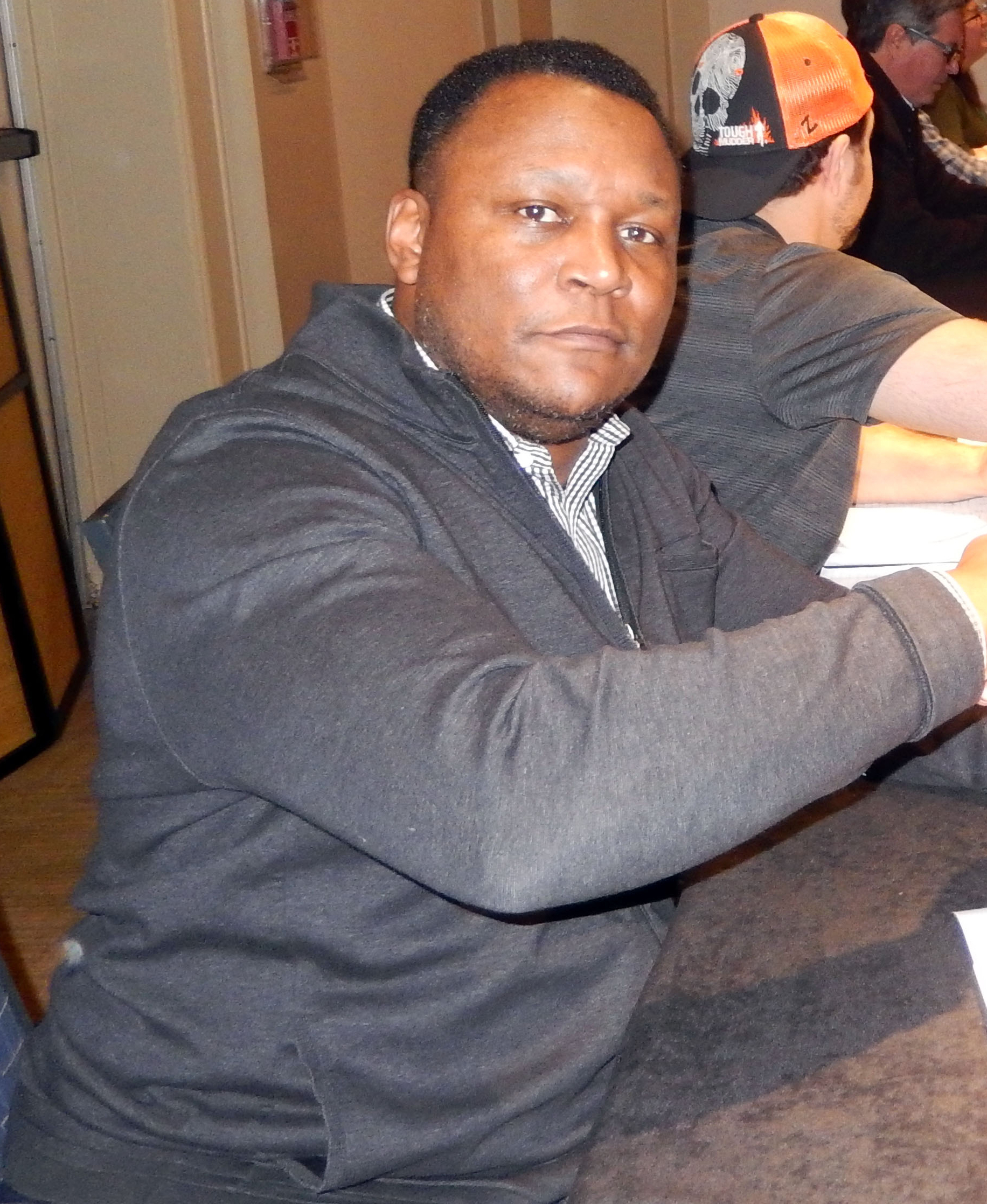
Barry Sanders

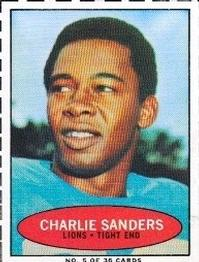
Charlie Sanders

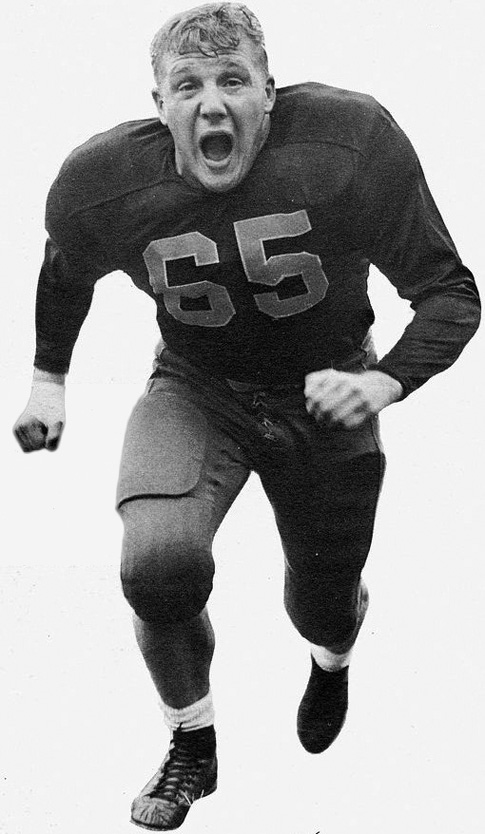
Joe Schmidt

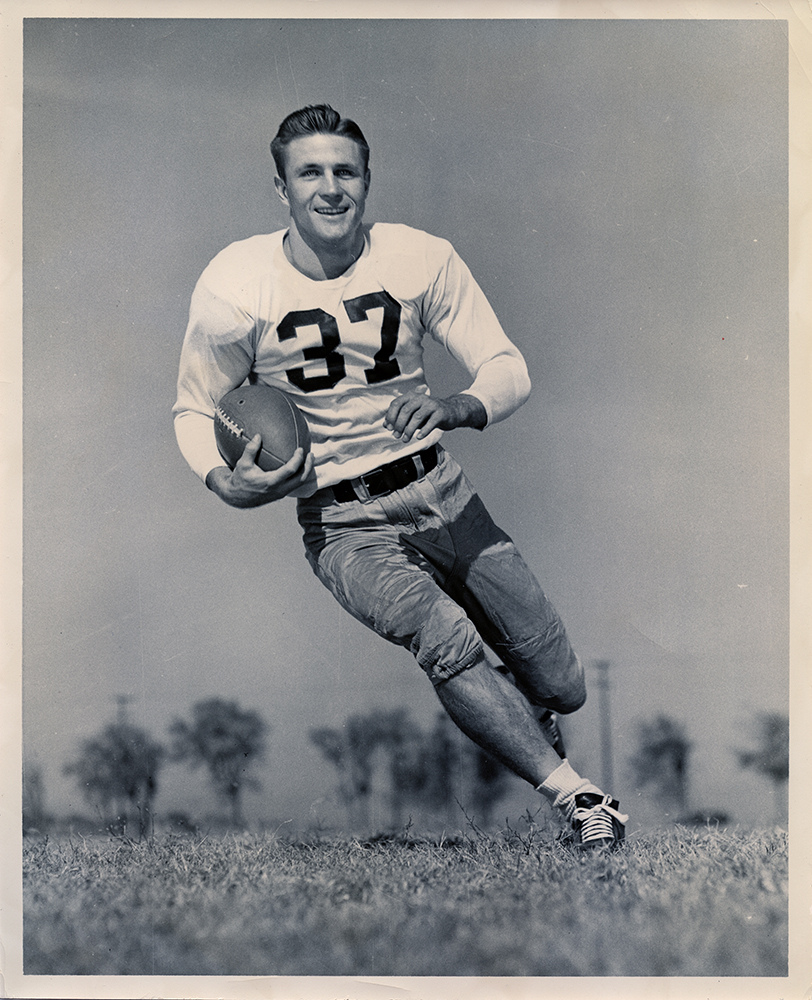
Doak Walker

=== Retired numbers ===
Detroit Lions retired numbers
No.	Player	Position	Tenure	Retired
7	Dutch Clark	B	1931–1932; 1934–1938	October 15, 1939
20	Lem Barney	CB	1967–1977	November 25, 2004
20	Billy Sims	RB	1980–1984	November 25, 2004
20	Barry Sanders	RB	1989–1998	November 25, 2004
22	Bobby Layne	QB, K	1950–1958	
37	Doak Walker	HB, K, P	1950–1955	December 11, 1955
56	Joe Schmidt ^{1}	LB	1953–1965	
85	Chuck Hughes ^{2}	WR	1970–1971	October 28, 1971

Notes:

- ^{1} The No. 56 was temporarily unretired with Schmidt's blessing when the Lions acquired linebacker Pat Swilling from the New Orleans Saints. No player has worn it since Swilling left.
- ^{2} Posthumous. Hughes died of a heart attack during a game on October 24, 1971, and his No. 85 was retired. Over the years, however, the number has been reissued.

Special cases

- The Lions retired No. 93 for the 2009 season after Corey Smith disappeared, presumed dead, when a boat he was fishing in with friends capsized off the Florida coast. The Lions also wore 93 decals on their helmets that season. The number was assigned to Kyle Vanden Bosch in 2010.

=== 75th Season All-Time Team ===
On November 9, 2008, the Lions honored the 75th Season All-Time Team during halftime against the Jacksonville Jaguars. The team was chosen via an online fan poll and selection committee. Bold indicates those elected to the Pro Football Hall of Fame.

75th Season All-Time Team
No.	Player	Position	Tenure
6	Jim Arnold	P	1986–1993
60	Al Baker	DE	1978–1982
20	**Lem Barney**	CB	1967–1977
36	Bennie Blades	DB	1988–1996
75	Lomas Brown	T	1985–1995
76	Roger Brown	DT	1960–1966
19, 24	**Jack Christiansen**	DB	1951–1958
7, 12, 19	**Dutch Clark**	QB	1931–1932; 1934–1938
89	Gail Cogdill	WR	1960–1968
76	**Lou Creekmur**	G/T	1950–1959
25	Jim David	DB	1952–1959
44	Don Doll	DB	1949–1952
78	Doug English	DT	1975–1985
54	Ed Flanagan	C	1965–1974
53	Kevin Glover	C	1985–1997
75	John Gordy	OG	1957–1967
23	Mel Gray	KR/PR	1989–1994
4	Jason Hanson ^{1}	K	1992–2012
71	**Alex Karras**	DT	1958–1962; 1964–1970
81	**Dick "Night Train" Lane**	CB	1960–1965
28	**Yale Lary**	DB, P	1952–1953; 1956–1964
22	**Bobby Layne**	QB	1950–1958
24, 44	**Dick LeBeau**	DB	1959–1972
84	Herman Moore	WR	1991–2001
3	Eddie Murray	K	1980–1991
91	Robert Porcher	DE	1992–2003
20	**Barry Sanders**	RB	1989–1998
88	**Charlie Sanders**	TE	1968–1977
30	Cory Schlesinger	FB	1995–2006
56	**Joe Schmidt**	LB	1953–1965
66	Harley Sewell	OG	1953–1962
20	Billy Sims	RB	1980–1984
54	Chris Spielman	LB	1988–1995
37	**Doak Walker**	HB	1950–1955
55	Wayne Walker	LB	1958–1972
30, 50	**Alex Wojciechowicz**	C, LB	1938–1946

Note:

- ^{1} Hanson was active at the time of the selection.

=== Lions All-Time Team ===
On September 29, 2019, the Lions honored their All-Time Team in celebration of the NFL's centennial during halftime against the Kansas City Chiefs. The team was chosen via fan voting, contributions from the Detroit Lions Legends Community, team executives, and select members of the media. Bold indicates those elected to the Pro Football Hall of Fame.

Lions All-Time Team
No.	Player	Position	Tenure
60	Al Baker	DE	1978–1982
20	**Lem Barney**	CB	1967–1977
36	Bennie Blades	DB	1988–1996
75	Lomas Brown	T	1985–1995
76	Roger Brown	DT	1960–1966
19, 24	**Jack Christiansen**	DB	1951–1958
7, 12, 19	**Dutch Clark**	QB	1931–1932; 1934–1938
89	Gail Cogdill	WR	1960–1968
76	**Lou Creekmur**	G/T	1950–1959
25	Jim David	DB	1952–1959
44	Don Doll	DB	1949–1952
7, 20, 56	Ox Emerson	G, C, LB	1931–1937
78	Doug English	DT	1975–1985
54	Ed Flanagan	C	1965–1974
53	Kevin Glover	C	1985–1997
23	Mel Gray	KR/PR	1989–1994
4	Jason Hanson	K	1992–2012
81	**Calvin Johnson**	WR	2007–2015
71	**Alex Karras**	DT	1958–1962; 1964–1970
81	**Dick "Night Train" Lane**	CB	1960–1965
28	**Yale Lary**	DB, P	1952–1953; 1956–1964
22	**Bobby Layne**	QB	1950–1958
24, 44	**Dick LeBeau**	DB	1959–1972
53	Mike Lucci	LB	1965–1973
84	Herman Moore	WR	1991–2001
48	Don Muhlbach ^{1}	LS	2004–2020
33	Nick Pietrosante	FB	1959–1965
91	Robert Porcher	DE	1992–2003
20	**Barry Sanders**	RB	1989–1998
88	**Charlie Sanders**	TE	1968–1977
30	Cory Schlesinger	FB	1995–2006
56	**Joe Schmidt**	LB	1953–1965
66	Harley Sewell	OG	1953–1962
20	Billy Sims	RB	1980–1984
54	Chris Spielman	LB	1988–1995
9	Matthew Stafford ^{1}	QB	2009–2020
63	**Dick Stanfel**	OG	1952–1955
37	**Doak Walker**	HB	1950–1955
30, 50	**Alex Wojciechowicz**	C, LB	1938–1946

Note:

- ^{1} Stafford and Muhlbach were active at the time of the selection.

== Staff ==
=== Current staff ===
Detroit Lions staff
Front office: Owner – Sheila Ford Hamp; Vice chairpeople – William Clay Ford Jr., Martha Ford Morse, Elizabeth Ford Kontulis; President/CEO – Rod Wood; Executive vice president & general manager – Brad Holmes; Chief operating officer – Mike Disner; Special assistant/chairperson – Chris Spielman; Assistant general manager – Ray Agnew; Vice president of player personnel – Dwayne Joseph; Vice president, roster operations/evaluations – Rob Lohman; Director of college scouting – Brian Hudspeth; Assistant director of college scouting – Mark Olson; Director of pro scouting – Joe Kelleher; Senior personnel executive – John Dorsey; Personnel advisor – Chris Grier; Senior director of football administration – Charlie Adkins; Director, football information – Caio Brighenti; Manager, decision science & football information – Paul Ibrahim; Head coaches: Head coach – Dan Campbell; Associate head coach/wide receivers – Scottie Montgomery; Assistant head coach/safeties – Jim O'Neil; Offensive coaches: Offensive coordinator – Drew Petzing; Passing game coordinator – Mike Kafka; Quarterbacks – Mark Brunell; Running backs – Tashard Choice; Assistant wide receivers – Bruce Gradkowski; Tight ends – Steve Oliver; Run game coordinator/offensive line – Hank Fraley; Pass game specialist – David Shaw; Offensive assistant – Dan Skipper; Offensive assistant – Marques Tuiasosopo; Offensive quality control – Justin Mesa	Defensive coaches: Defensive coordinator – Kelvin Sheppard; Run game coordinator/defensive line – Kacy Rodgers; Linebackers – Shaun Dion Hamilton; Passing game coordinator/defensive backs – Deshea Townsend; Senior defensive assistant/outside linebackers – David Corrao; Defensive assistant – Caleb Collins; Defensive assistant – August Mangin; Defensive quality control – Dré Thompson; Special teams coaches: Special teams coordinator – Dave Fipp; Assistant special teams – Jett Modkins; Strength and conditioning: Director of sports performance – Mike Clark; Director of sports science – Jill Costanza; Head strength & conditioning – Josh Schuler; Assistant strength & conditioning – Thaddeus Jackson; Assistant strength & conditioning – Cameron Josse; → Coaching staff → Front office → More NFL staffs

=== Head coaches ===
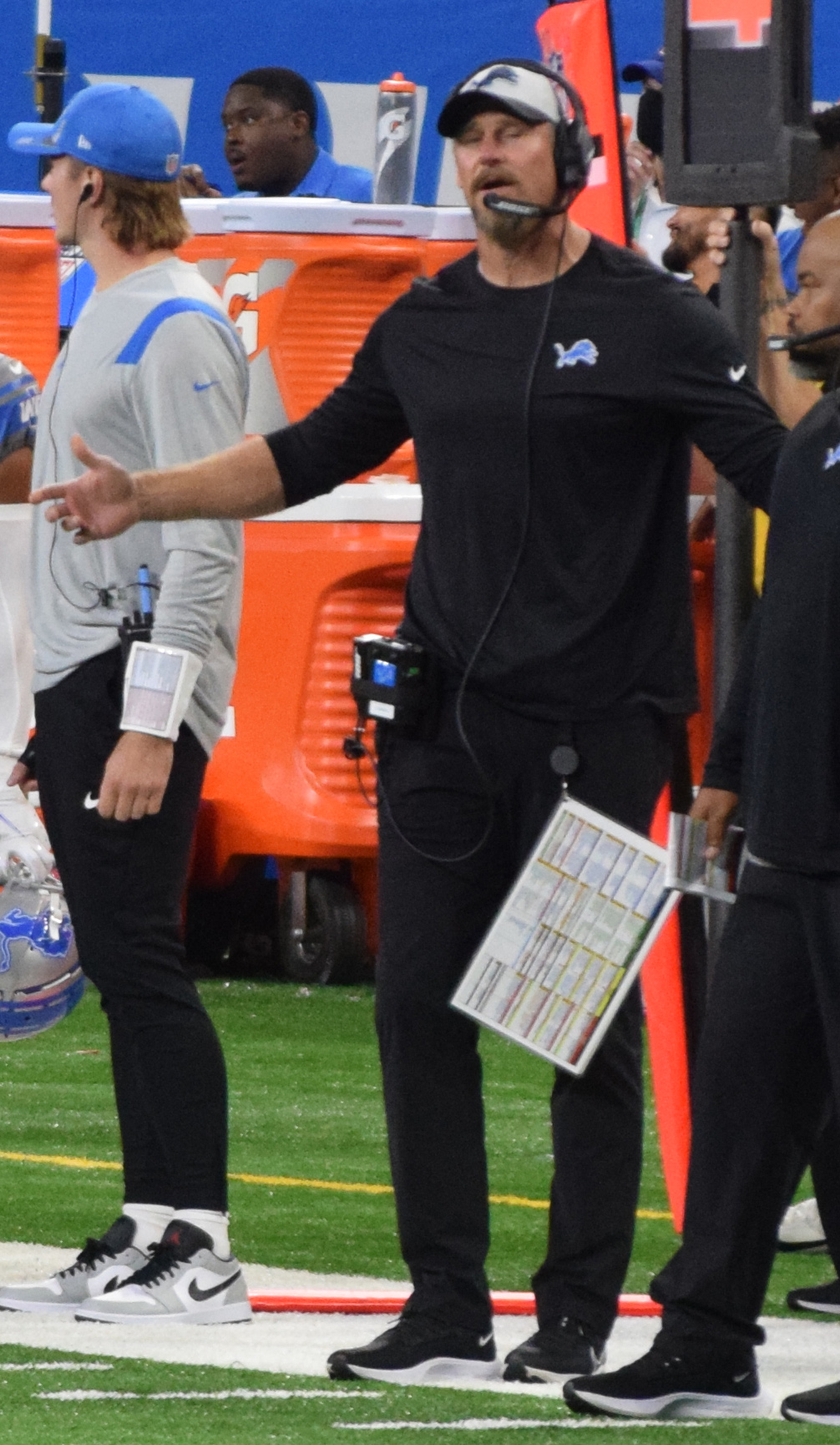
Dan Campbell, the head coach of the Detroit Lions

The Lions have had 30 head coaches throughout their franchise history. Their first head coach was Hal Griffen, who compiled a 5–6–3 (.464) overall record with the team of 1930. Wayne Fontes was the longest-tenured head coach in Lions history, serving from 1988 to 1996. The current head coach of the Lions is Dan Campbell, who was hired on January 20, 2021.

=== Offensive coordinators ===
Name	Tenure
No offensive coordinator	1934–1966
Bill McPeak	1967–1972
No offensive coordinator	1973–1975
Ken Shipp	1976
Ed Hughes	1977
Bob Schnelker	1978–1981
Ted Marchibroda	1982–1983
Bill Nelsen	1984
Bob Baker	1985–1988
Dave Levy	1991
Dan Henning	1992–1993
Dave Levy	1994
Tom Moore	1994–1996
Sylvester Croom	1997–2000
Gary Moeller	2000
Maurice Carthon	2001–2002
Sherman Lewis	2003–2004
Ted Tollner	2005
Mike Martz	2006–2007
Jim Colletto	2008
Scott Linehan	2009–2013
Joe Lombardi	2014–2015
Jim Bob Cooter	2015–2018
Darrell Bevell	2019–2020
Anthony Lynn	2021
Ben Johnson	2022–2024
John Morton	2025
Drew Petzing	2026–present

=== Defensive coordinators ===
Name	Tenure
No defensive coordinator	1934–1951
Buster Ramsey	1952–1959
No defensive coordinator	1960
Don Shula	1961–1962
No defensive coordinator	1963–1966
Jim David	1967–1972
No defensive coordinator	1973–1976
Fritz Shurmur	1977
No defensive coordinator	1978–1979
Maxie Baughan	1980–1982
Ed Beard	1983–1984
Wayne Fontes	1985–1988
Woody Widenhofer	1989–1992
Hank Bullough	1993
Herb Paterra	1994–1995
Jim Eddy	1996
Larry Peccatiello	1997–2000
Vince Tobin	2001
Kurt Schottenheimer	2002–2003
Dick Jauron	2004–2005
Donnie Henderson	2006
Joe Barry	2007–2008
Gunther Cunningham	2009–2013
Teryl Austin	2014–2017
Paul Pasqualoni	2018–2019
Cory Undlin	2020
Aaron Glenn	2021–2024
Kelvin Sheppard	2025–present

=== Special teams coordinators ===
Name	Tenure
John Bonamego	2019
Brayden Coombs	2020
Dave Fipp	2021–present

== Rivalries ==
=== Divisional ===
==== Chicago Bears ====
The Lions and Chicago Bears first met in 1930 when the Lions were known as the Portsmouth Spartans. The Bears and Lions have been division rivals since 1933. As of the 2026 season, the Bears lead the series 105–82–5.

==== Green Bay Packers ====
The Lions and Green Bay Packers first met in 1929 when the Lions were known as the Portsmouth Spartans. The Lions and Packers have been division rivals since 1933. As of the 2026 season, the Packers lead the series 108–79–7.

==== Minnesota Vikings ====
The Lions and Minnesota Vikings have played twice annually since the Vikings entered the NFL in 1961, excluding 1982 due to the strike that occurred that season. As of the 2026 season, the Vikings lead the all-time series 82–46–2.

=== Former ===
==== Tampa Bay Buccaneers ====
The Lions and the Tampa Bay Buccaneers were also division opponents in the NFC Central from 1977 to 2001. As of the 2026 season, the Lions lead the all-time series 35–30.

=== Historic ===
==== Cleveland Browns ====
The Lions also share a rivalry with the Cleveland Browns, which began in the 1950s when the Browns and Lions played each other in four NFL Championship Games. The Lions won three of those championships, while the Browns won one. This was one of the NFL's best rivalries in the 1950s. Since the AFL–NFL merger of 1970, the teams have met much less frequently due to the Browns' move to the American Football Conference (AFC). From 2002 to 2014, the two teams played an annual preseason game known as the "Great Lakes Classic". As of the 2026 season, the Lions lead the all-time series 20–6, with three of those wins coming in postseason play.

==== Los Angeles Rams ====
The Lions have played the Rams more than any other non-divisional team with 90 total matchups over the years dating back to 1937. In the 2023–24 playoffs, the Rams and Lions met for their first postseason matchup since 1952. The Lions won 24–23 in Matthew Stafford's first game back in Detroit since being traded to the Rams. As of the 2026 season, the Rams lead the all-time series 46–43–1.

== Radio and television ==
=== Radio ===
The Lions' flagship radio station is WXYT-FM. Dan Miller does play-by-play, Lomas Brown does color commentary, and T. J. Lang is the sideline reporter.

In 2015, the team announced that they were moving from WXYT-FM to WJR for the 2016 NFL season, ending a 20-year relationship with CBS Radio. The decision to part with WXYT was reportedly instigated by a demand by the team for the station to fire on-air personality Mike Valenti, who has had a history of making critical comments about the Lions during his drivetime show, as a condition of any future renewal. A CBS Radio spokesperson stated that their refusal was meant to maintain the station's integrity.

The Lions' flagship station returned to WXYT-FM starting with the 2021 season.

=== TV ===
==== Preseason ====
In 2015, WJBK took over from WXYZ-TV as the flagship station for Lions preseason games. In 2026, the announcers were Jason Benetti with play-by-play, T. J. Lang with color commentary, and Patti Cesarini with sideline reports. Jack Kizer filled in for Benetti during the first preseason game.

==== Regular season ====
Regular season games are broadcast regionally on Fox, except when the Lions play an AFC team in Detroit, in which case the game airs regionally on CBS; however, since 2014, with the institution of the NFL's "cross flex" broadcast rules, any Lions game slated to air on Fox can be moved to CBS. The Thanksgiving Day game in Detroit is always televised nationally, alternating between Fox in odd years and CBS in even years. In 2011, the Lions became the last NFC team to play on NBC's Sunday Night Football since the network began airing Sunday night games in 2006.

==== Blackouts ====
The Lions' winless performance in 2008 and 2–14 season in 2009, coupled with the effects of the Great Recession in Michigan, led to several local broadcast blackouts, as local fans did not purchase enough tickets by the 72-hour blackout deadline. The first blackout in the then seven-year history of Ford Field was on October 26, 2008, against the Washington Redskins. The previous 50 regular season home games had been sellouts. The second home game of the 2009 season in which the Lions broke the losing streak, also against the Redskins, was blacked out locally, as well as the comeback victory over the Cleveland Browns. The Lions had only one blackout in 2010, yet another Redskins game, which the Lions won 37–25. However, in 2015, the NFL suspended its blackout policies, meaning that all Lions games will be shown on local TV, regardless of tickets sold.

Games were also often blacked out at the Lions' previous home, the 80,000-seat Pontiac Silverdome, despite winning seasons and the success and popularity of star players such as Barry Sanders.

== Lions cheerleaders ==
On June 13, 2016, the Lions announced the addition of cheerleaders to the organization. The team also announced that Rebecca Girard-Smoker, formerly the director of the Detroit Pistons dance team, would be the coach of the cheerleading squad. It marked the first time in over 40 years the team had an official cheerleading squad. The cheerleading squad is a part of the entertainment during football games, and active at community events.

== See also ==
- NFL on Thanksgiving Day
- Portsmouth Spartans

Preceded by New York Giants	NFL champions 1935	Succeeded by Green Bay Packers
Preceded by Los Angeles Rams	NFL champions 1952, 1953	Succeeded by Cleveland Browns
Preceded by New York Giants	NFL champions 1957	Succeeded by Baltimore Colts
