= Woods (surname) =

Origin
- Region of origin: England, Scotland, Ireland

Woods is a common surname of English, Scottish and Irish origin.

People with this surname include:

== A ==
- Aaron Woods (born 1991), Australian rugby league footballer
- Aaron Woods (politician) (1950–2025), American politician
- Aaron Woods (gridiron football) (born 1986), American and Canadian football player
- Abraham Woods, American civil rights leader
- Adam Woods (born 2001), Swedish singer
- Al Woods (American football) (born 1987), American football player
- Alan Woods (disambiguation), multiple people
- Albert Woods (1816–1904), English officer of arms at the College of Arms in London
- Albert Woods (footballer), English footballer
- Albert H. Woods (1870–1951), born Aladore Herman, American theatrical producer
- Alex Woods, multiple people
- Alexander Woods (2000–2022), American rapper
- Alice Woods, multiple people
- Alva Woods (1794–1887), American Christian minister
- Alvis Woods (born 1953), American baseball player
- Andrew Woods, multiple people
- Anthony Woods (born 1980), American soldier and politician
- Artha Woods, American politician
- Arthur Woods, multiple people
- Ashley A. Woods, American comic artist
- Aubrey Woods (1928–2013), English actor
- Ayiesha Woods (born 1979), contemporary Christian musician

== B ==
- Bambi Woods (born 1955), American pornographic actress
- Barbara Alyn Woods, American actress
- Bec Woods (born 1981), Australian surfer
- Belita Woods (1948–2012), lead singer of R&B groups, Brainstorm and Parliament-Funkadelic
- Ben Woods (born 1982), rugby union footballer
- Benjamin Woods, New Zealand soldier, police officer, and bailiff
- Bill Woods (disambiguation), also Billy Woods, multiple people
- Bobby Wayne Woods (1965–2009), American rapist, kidnapper and murderer
- Bradley Woods-Garness, English-born Montserratian footballer
- Brian Woods (disambiguation), multiple people
- Bryan Woods, American filmmaker

== C ==
- Calum Woods (born 1987), English (soccer) footballer
- Cary Woods, American film producer
- Charles Woods (disambiguation), multiple people
- Chevy Woods (born 1981), American rapper and songwriter
- Chris Woods (disambiguation), multiple people
- Christie Lee Woods (born 1977), American model and actress
- Christine Woods (born 1983), American actress in the HBO series Hello Ladies
- Clare Woods (artist) (born 1972), British artist
- Clinton Woods (born 1972), British professional boxer
- Clinton Edgar Woods (1863–1930), electrical, mechanical engineer and automotive engineer
- Corey Woods, musical artist

== D ==
- D. Woods (born 1985), American singer
- Da'Love Woods (born 1982), American basketball player
- Daniel Woods, American rock climber
- Danny Woods (1942–2018), American singer, member of Chairmen of the Board
- Darren Woods (born 1965), American businessman
- Darren Keith Woods (born 1958), American opera director and operatic tenor
- Dean Woods (1966–2022), Australian racing cyclist
- Denyse Woods, American-Irish writer
- Derek Woods, Canadian composer
- D. J. Woods (born 1989), American gridiron player
- Don Woods (American football) (born 1951), American football player
- Don Woods (meteorologist) (1928–2012), American meteorologist and cartoonist
- Don Woods (programmer) (born 1954), computer games programmer
- Donald Woods (1933–2001), South African journalist and anti-apartheid activist
- Donald Woods (actor) (1906–1998), Canadian-American film and television actor
- Donald Devereux Woods (1912–1964), British microbiologist
- Doris Woods (1902–1956), British artistic gymnast

== E ==
- E. J. Woods (1839–1916), architect in South Australia
- Earl Woods (1932–2006), US Army officer, father of Tiger Woods
- Ed Woods (born 2002), American football player
- Edward Woods, multiple people
- Elijah Woods, multiple people
- Eliza Woods (1872–1961), American composer
- Elizabeth Woods (born 1960), Australian magistrate and basketball administrator
- Emma Woods, Canadian ice hockey player
- Ethel Woods (1865–1939), English stratigrapher, invertebrate paleontologist, and geologist
- Eugene Woods, Irish Archdeacon
- Evie Woods (1976), Irish novelist

== F ==
- Frances Woods (1864 - 1959), American physician and suffragist
- Francis Woods, Canadian politician
- Frank Woods, multiple people
- Frederick S. Woods (1864–1950), American mathematician
- Fronza Woods, American filmmaker

== G ==
- George Woods (disambiguation), multiple people
- Georgie Woods (1927–2005), American radio personality
- Grant Woods (1954–2021), Attorney General of Arizona 1991–1999
- Granville Woods (1856–1910), African-American inventor of tram and railway equipment
- Gurdon Woods (1915–2007), American sculptor, academic administrator

== H ==
- Harriett Woods (1927–2007), American politician and activist
- Harry Woods (disambiguation), multiple people
- Henry Woods (disambiguation), multiple people
- Hilton Woods (1968–2026), Dutch Antillean swimmer
- Homer B. Woods (1869–1941), justice of the Supreme Court of Appeals of West Virginia

== I ==
- Ian Woods (born 1966), British biathlete
- Ickey Woods (born 1966), American football player
- Ida E. Woods (1870–1940), American astronomer
- Ilene Woods (1929–2010), American actress and singer, voice of Disney's Cinderella
- Ivan Woods, Maltese footballer

== J ==
- Jack Woods, multiple people
- Jackson Woods, Australian boxer
- Jake Woods (born 1981), American baseball pitcher
- Jamal Woods (born 1999), American football player
- James Woods (disambiguation), multiple people
- Jane Woods (1946–2022), American politician
- Janet Woods, English photographer and hostess
- Janice Woods Windle, American writer
- Jean Woods (1850–1928), Canadian politician
- Jelani Woods (born 1998), American football player
- Jerome Woods (born 1973), American football player
- Jessie E. Woods (1909–2001), one of the first American woman pilots
- Jim Woods (1916–1988), American sportscaster
- Jim Woods (baseball) (born 1939), American baseball player
- Jimmy Woods (1934–2018), American jazz musician
- John Woods (disambiguation), multiple people
- Jon Woods (born 1977), American politician, record producer and musician
- Joseph Woods (disambiguation), multiple people
- Josh Woods (American football) (born 1996), American football player
- Josie Woods (1912–2008), British dancer and activist
- Josie Alma Woods (1889–1983), American politician
- JT Woods (born 2000), American football player
- Julian Woods (disambiguation), multiple people

== K ==
- K. Woods, West Indian cricket umpire
- Kate Woods, Australian film and television director
- Kate Woods (field hockey) (born 1981), South African hockey player
- Katharine Pearson Woods (1853–1923), American writer
- Ken Woods, Australian lawn bowler
- Kenny Woods, American composer, producer, and musician
- Kim Woods, British archaeologist
- Kristine Woods, American sculptor and textile artist

== L ==
- Laura Woods, multiple people
- Lawrence Woods (born 1998), American football player
- Lebbeus Woods (1940–2012), American architect and artist known unconventional designs
- Leona Woods (1919–1986), American nuclear physicist
- Leonard Woods, multiple people
- Lilia Woods (born 1969), Bulgarian-American physicist
- Linus Woods, Canadian artist
- Loren Woods (born 1978), American-Lebanese professional basketball player
- Louis E. Woods (1895–1971), aviator with American Marine Corps

== M ==
- Margaret Louisa Woods (née Bradley; 1855–1945), English writer, married Henry George Woods
- Marilyn Warren Woods (1914–1998), American activist and community leader
- Marjorie Curry Woods, American historian
- Mark Kenneth Woods, Canadian comedy writer, actor, producer, director and TV host.
- Martin Woods (born 1986), Scottish (soccer) footballer.
- Mary Lee Woods (1924–2017), English mathematician and computer scientist
- Megan Woods (born 1973), New Zealand politician
- Megan Woods, American singer
- Mehitable E. Woods (1813–1891), hero of the American Civil War
- Michael Woods (disambiguation), also Mike Woods, multiple people
- Mimi Woods, American voice actress known primarily for voice-overs in Japanese anime
- Mitch Woods (born 1951), American boogie-woogie, jump blues and jazz pianist and singer

== N ==
- Nan Woods (born Susan Nan Woods, 1966), American actress in the ABC television series China Beach
- Ngaire Woods (born 1962/1963), New Zealand-born founding dean of the Blavatnik School of Government at University of Oxford
- Nic Woods Nicholas Woods (born 1995), New Zealand field hockey player
- Neil Woods, English football manager
- Norman Woods (1936–2015), New Zealand cricketer

== O ==
- Oscar "Buddy" Woods (1903–1955), American Texas blues guitarist, singer and songwriter

== P ==
- Pat Woods (disambiguation), multiple people
- Paul Woods (disambiguation), multiple people
- Pauline Nakamarra Woods (born 1949), Australian indigenous painter
- Pete Woods, American comic book artist
- Peter Woods (disambiguation), multiple people
- Phil Woods (1931–2015), jazz saxophonist
- Pinky Woods (Philip Wells Woods) (1931–2015), American jazz alto saxophonist, clarinetist, bandleader, and composer

== Q ==
- Qyntel Woods (born 1981), American professional basketball player

== R ==
- Randy Woods Randolph Woods (born 1970), American professional basketball player
- Rashaun Woods (born 1980), American pro football player
- Ray Woods (1895–1965), American college basketball standout for Illinois in the 1910s
- Ray Woods (footballer) (born 1965), footballer with Tranmere Rovers, Wigan Athletic, Coventry City and Shrewsbury Town
- Renn Woods (previously Ren Woods, born 1958), American film, television and stage actress, vocalist and songwriter
- Robin Woods (1914–1997), English bishop
- Robert Woods (disambiguation), multiple people
- Rose Mary Woods (1917–2005), Richard Nixon's secretary from 1951 through the end of his political career
- Roy Woods (born 1996), Canadian singer, rapper and songwriter

== S ==
- Samuel Woods (disambiguation), multiple people
- Seamus Woods, 1920s Irish Republican Army leader
- Sean Woods (born 1970), American basketball player and coach
- Shelly Woods (Rochelle "Shelly" Woods) (born 1986), British wheelchair racer, competed in two Paralympic Games
- Simeon Woods Richardson (born 2000), American baseball player
- Simon Woods (born 1980), English actor in the British-American TV series Rome and the BBC1 series Cranford
- Skip Woods (born 1970), American screenwriter, producer and film director
- Sparky Woods (born 1953), American football coach
- Stacey Grenrock-Woods (born 1968), American writer, actress, and correspondent on The Daily Show
- Stanley Woods (1903–1993), Irish motorcycle racer in the 1920s and 1930s
- Steve Woods (Stephen John Woods) (born 1976), English footballer with Chesterfield, Plymouth Argyle, Stoke City and Torquay United
- Stevie Woods (musician) (1951–2014), American R&B singer
- Stuart Woods (1938–2022), American novelist
- Sydney Woods (politician) (1853 – after 1895), merchant and politician in Newfoundland
- Sidney S. Woods Sidney Sterling Woods (1917–1989), American fighter ace of World War II
- Symere Woods (born 1994), American rapper known professionally as Lil Uzi Vert

== T ==
- Taryn Woods (born 1975), Australian water polo player
- Teri Woods (born 1968), American novelist
- Terry Woods (born 1947), Irish folk musician
- Thomas Woods (disambiguation), multiple people
- Tiger Woods (born 1975), American golfer
- Tim Woods (George Burrell Woodin) (1934–2002), American professional wrestler
- Tom Woods (disambiguation), also Tommy Woods, multiple people
- Tony Woods (Australian rules footballer)
- Tony Woods (comedian), American comedian
- Tyler Woods (born 1982), American singer-songwriter
- Tyrone Woods (Walter Tyrone Woods) (born 1969), professional baseball player with Nippon
- Tyrone S. Woods (Tyrone Snowden Woods) (1971–2012), American CIA security officer killed in 2012 Benghazi attack

== V ==
- Valerie Woods, Belizean politician
- Vincent Woods (born 1960), Irish poet, playwright and RTÉ Radio 1 arts show host
- Virna Woods, American author and playwright

== W ==
- Wendy Woods (1941–2013), South African educator and anti-apartheid activist
- William Woods (disambiguation) multiple people

== X ==
- Xavier Woods (born 1986), ring name of American professional wrestler Austin Watson
- Xavier Woods (American football) (born 1995), American football player

== Z ==
- Zach Woods (born 1984), American actor

== Fictional characters ==
- Alexx Woods, on CSI: Miami
- Babs Woods, on the British soap opera Family Affairs
- Darren Woods, a character in the 1985 American science fantasy movie Explorers
- Dawn Woods (also Hope), on the British ITV soap opera Emmerdale
- Elle Woods, in the novel, film and Broadway adaptation Legally Blonde
- Nancy Woods, in Archie Comics
- Penny Gordon Woods, in the American sitcom Good Times
- Frank Woods, main supporting character in Call of Duty: Black Ops, Call of Duty: Black Ops II and Call of Duty: Black Ops Cold War
- T.J. Woods, on the British ITV soap opera Emmerdale
- Tanya Woods, on the British soap opera Family Affairs
- Terry Woods (Emmerdale), on the British ITV soap opera Emmerdale
- Whispy Woods, in Nintendo's Kirby series of video games
- Willona Woods, in the American sitcom Good Times

== See also ==
- Wood (surname)
