= Edward Wood =

Edward or Ed Wood may refer to:

- Edward Wood (MP) (fl. 1584–86), English politician
- Edward Wood (British Army officer) (1841–1898)
- Ed Wood (1924–1978), American filmmaker
  - Ed Wood (film), a 1994 film based on the life of the filmmaker
- Edward Wood, 1st Earl of Halifax (1881–1959), British politician
- Edward J. Wood (1866–1956), leader of the Church of Jesus Christ of Latter-day Saints in Alberta, Canada
- Edward Allan Wood (1872–1930), British Army officer
- Edward Rogers Wood (1866–1941), financier in Canadian business
- Edward Wood (priest), archdeacon of Mashonaland, 1946–1960
- Edward John Wood, footballer known as Jackie Wood
- Ed Wood (engineer) (born 1968), former chief designer for the Williams Formula One team
- Ed Wood (elm cultivar), a Chinese elm cultivar

== See also ==
- Edward Woods (disambiguation)
