= Tommy Wood =

Tommy Wood may refer to:

- Tommy Wood (motorcyclist)
- Tommy Wood (footballer)
- Tommy Wood (International Brigades)
- Tommy Wood, stage name of Czech model Tomas Skoloudik

== See also ==
- Tom Wood (disambiguation)
- Tom Woods (disambiguation)
