= Henry Wood (disambiguation) =

Henry Wood (1869–1944) was an English conductor.

Henry Wood may also refer to:

- Henry Wood (cricketer, born 1853) (1853–1919), English cricketer
- Henry Wood (Somerset cricketer) (1872–1950)
- Henry Wood (author) (1834-1909) New Thought author and pioneer
- Henry Wise Wood (1860–1941), Alberta politician
- Henry Wood (architect), architect of Ashton Court outbuildings (1805)
- Sir Henry Wood, 1st Baronet (1597–1671), member of parliament of England for Hythe 1661–71
- Henry Wood (minstrel), 19th-century New York City minstrel show manager
- Henry A. Wise Wood (1866–1939), American inventor
- Henry Conwell Wood (1840–1926), member of the Queensland Legislative Council
- Henry Moses Wood (1788–1867), architect based in Nottingham
- Henry Clay Wood (1832–1918), American Civil War general
- Henry Walter Wood (1825–1869), English architect
- Evelyn Wood (British Army officer) (Henry Evelyn Wood, 1838–1919), British field marshal and Victoria Cross recipient
- Henry Wood (scholar) (1849–1925), American professor of German studies
- Ellen Wood (author) (1814–1887), writing as Mrs Henry Wood, English novelist
- Henry Wood, a fictional character in The Adventure of the Crooked Man, a Sherlock Holmes story by Arthur Conan Doyle
- Harry Harvey Wood (1903–1977), founder of the Edinburgh Festival
- Henry Wood (footballer) (1865–1907), English football pioneer in Spain

== See also ==
- Harry Wood (disambiguation)
- Henry Woods (disambiguation)
