= Frances Wood (disambiguation) =

Frances Wood is an English historian.

Frances Wood may also refer to:

- Frances Wood (statistician) (1883–1919), English statistician
- Frances Fisher Wood (1852–1938), American educator, lecturer, and scientist
- Frances Shimer (1826–1901), Frances Ann Wood, founder of the Mount Carroll Seminary

== See also ==
- Francis Wood (disambiguation)
- Frank Wood (disambiguation)
