= Michigan Sports Hall of Fame =

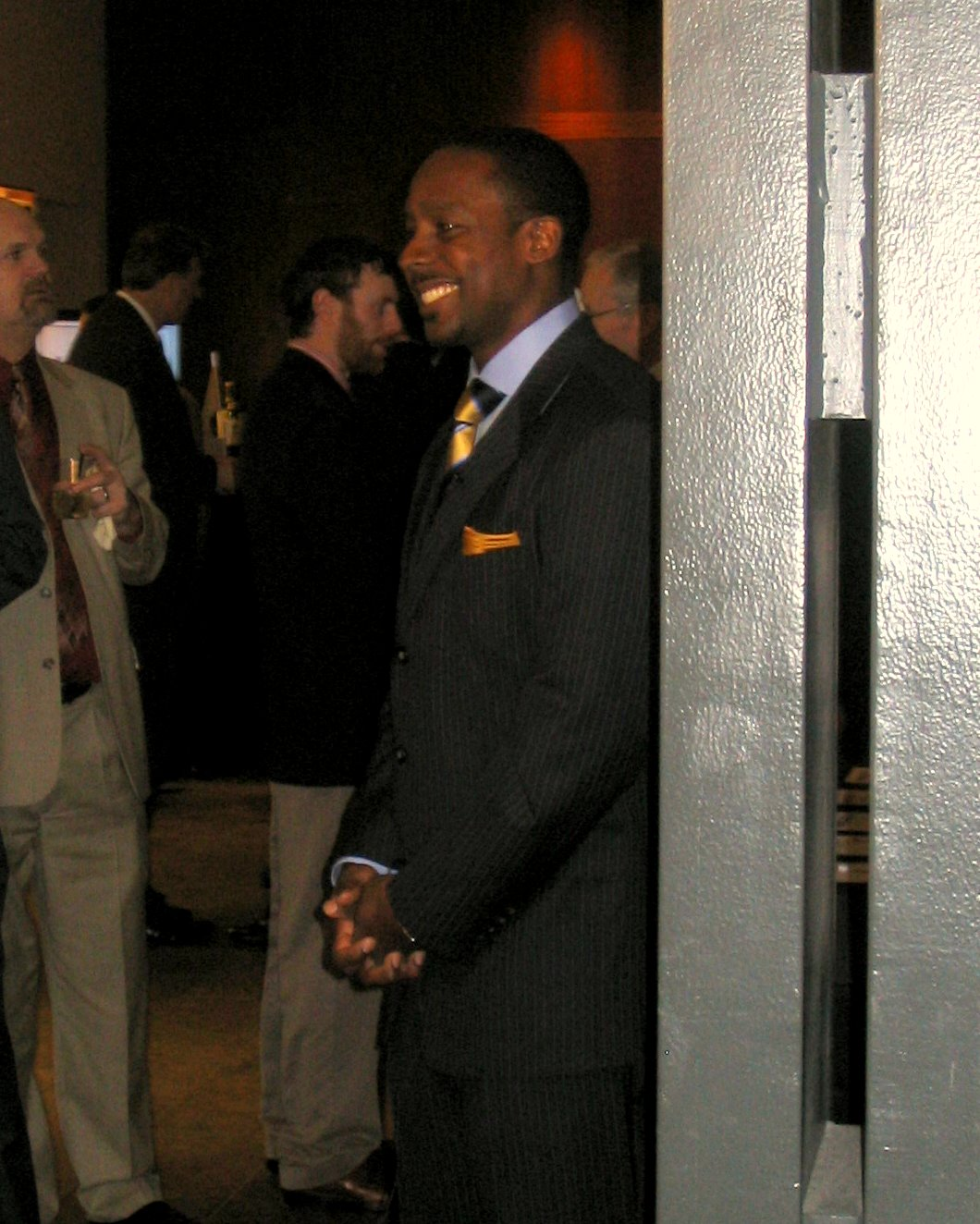
- Desmond Howard at the Michigan Sports Hall of Fame induction - Feb. 11, 2008
- Established: 1954
- Type: Hall of Fame
- Director: Scott Lesher (chairman)
- President: Jordan Field
- Website: michigansportshof.org

The Michigan Sports Hall of Fame is a Hall of Fame to honor Michigan sports athletes, coaches and contributors. It was organized in 1954 by Michigan Lieutenant Governor Philip Hart, Michigan State University athletic director, Biggie Munn, president of the Greater Michigan Foundation, Donald Weeks, general manager of the Detroit Lions, W. Nicholas Kerbawy and George Alderton of the Lansing State Journal. The inaugural class was inducted in 1955.

The Michigan Sports Hall of Fame also sponsors the Michigan MAC Trophy and the Michigan Sports Hall of Fame Cup. The class of 2023 included Richard Hamilton, Henrik Zetterberg, Rick Comley, Lamarr Woodley, Lorenzo White, Dawn Riley, Mike Emrick, Ryan Miller and Sierra Romero.

The class of 2024 was enshrined on October 17, 2024 in Detroit, and included Braylon Edwards, Tony Esposito, Cecil Fielder, Larry Foote, Jim Harbaugh, Ken Holland, Jake Long, Deanna Nolan, Shawn Respert, Iván Rodríguez and Don Shane. The late Earl Cureton was the 2024 Michigan Treasure recipient.

The class of 2025 included Chris Chelios, Claressa Shields, Rasheed Wallace, Mark Dantonio, David Dombrowski, Jason Richardson and John Lowe. The 2025 Michigan Treasure recipients are Jon Falk and Jim Schmakel.

The late Earl Cureton was the 2024 Michigan Treasure recipient.

The class of 2026 will be enshrined on December 17, 2026 in Detroit, and includes Swin Cash, Kevin Glover, Mark Ingram, Peter Vanderkaay, Tony Annese, Paul Woods and Bill Lajoie. The 2025 Michigan Treasure recipient is the late Mark Fidrych and the Courage Award recipient is Doug Drenth.

== Inductees ==
=== 1950s ===
- Jack Adams, 1955
- Dutch Clark, 1959
- Sam Crawford, 1958
- Ty Cobb, 1955
- Mickey Cochrane, 1956
- Gus Dorais, 1958
- Ray Fisher, 1959
- Charlie Gehringer, 1956
- George Gipp, 1957
- Hank Greenberg, 1958
- Walter Hagen, 1955
- Harry Heilmann, 1956
- Willie Heston, 1955
- Gordie Howe, 1957
- Hughie Jennings, 1958
- Stanley Ketchel, 1959
- Marion Ladewig, 1959
- Joe Louis, 1955
- Matt Mann, 1959
- Bennie Oosterbaan, 1958
- Allen Stowe, 1959
- Eddie Tolan, 1958
- Garfield Wood, 1956
- Fielding H. Yost, 1955

=== 1960s ===
- Sid Abel, 1967
- Lloyd Brazil, 1961
- Tommy Bridges, 1963
- Walter Briggs Sr., 1969
- Michael "Dad" Butler, 1960
- Fritz Crisler, 1960
- Kiki Cuyler, 1963
- Wish Egan, 1960
- Benny Friedman, 1961
- Ebbie Goodfellow, 1968
- Goose Goslin, 1965
- Tom Harmon, 1962
- Bill Hewitt, 1961
- Guy Houston, 1963
- Jean Hoxie, 1965
- Hayes Jones, 1969
- George Kell, 1969
- Harry Kipke, 1968
- John Kobs, 1968
- Bobby Layne, 1966
- Kid Lavigne, 1965
- Ted Lindsay, 1966
- Heinie Manush, 1964
- Fred Matthaei, 1964
- Jacob Mazer, 1967
- George Mullin, 1962
- Biggie Munn, 1961
- Hal Newhouser, 1962
- Branch Rickey, 1961
- Schoolboy Rowe, 1961
- Germany Schulz, 1960
- George Sisler, 1960
- Horton Smith, 1960
- Doak Walker, 1967
- Al Watrous, 1962
- Byron White, 1962
- Adolph Wolgast, 1964
- George Young, 1966
- Ralph Young, 1962

=== 1970s ===
- Vince Banonis, 1975
- Les Bingaman, 1971
- Sam Bishop, 1977
- Bob Calihan, 1971
- Don Canham, 1978
- Duffy Daugherty, 1975
- Dave DeBusschere, 1977
- Alex Delvecchio, 1977
- Gerald Ford, 1977
- Henry Ford, 1978
- Charles Forsythe, 1970
- Lyman Frimodig, 1976
- Lofton Greene, 1974
- Ace Gutowsky, 1979
- David L. Holmes, 1975
- Hudson High School football team, 1976
- Al Kaline, 1978
- Chuck Kocsis, 1974
- Ron Kramer, 1971
- Ann Marston, 1977
- Fr. James Martin, 1978
- Terry McDermott, 1972
- Earl Morrall, 1979
- Frank Navin, 1976
- James F. Norris Sr., 1976
- Buddy Parker, 1976
- John Pingel, 1973
- Warren Orlick, 1979
- George Richards, 1976
- Billy Rogell, 1970
- Mauri Rose, 1972
- Philip Sachs, 1973
- Terry Sawchuk, 1974
- Norbert Schemansky, 1976
- Joe Schmidt, 1970
- Graham Steenhoven, 1979
- Lorenzo Wright, 1973
- Rudy York, 1972
- Fred Zollner, 1976

=== 1980s ===
- Mike Adray, 1983
- Lem Barney, 1985
- Dave Bing, 1984
- Jim Bunning, 1981
- Jim Campbell, 1985
- Norm Cash, 1984
- Jack Castignola, 1988
- Lynn Chandnois, 1988
- Jack Christiansen, 1986
- Istvan Danosi, 1985
- Chuck Davey, 1980
- Pete Dawkins, 1987
- Pete Elliott, 1983
- Andy Farkas, 1983
- John Fetzer, 1984
- Bill Freehan, 1982
- Bill Gadsby, 1986
- Chick Harbert, 1989
- Ernie Harwell, 1989
- John Hiller, 1989
- Robert Hoernschemeyer, 1985
- Willie Horton, 1987
- Glenn Johnson, 1988
- Joe Joseph, 1980
- Alex Karras, 1980
- Cliff Keen, 1981
- Nick Kerbawy, 1985
- Dick "Night Train" Lane, 1988
- Bob Lanier, 1989
- Yale Lary, 1988
- Mickey Lolich, 1982
- Don Lund, 1987
- John MacInnes, 1984
- Dick McAuliffe, 1986
- Kayo Morgan, 1987
- Bill Muncey, 1983
- Jeanne Omelenchuk, 1984
- Donald Ridler, 1981
- Will Robinson, 1982
- Bo Schembechler, 1989
- Virgil Trucks, 1985
- Bob Ufer, 1982
- Willis Ward, 1981
- Vic Wertz, 1983
- Bob Westfall, 1986
- George Wilson, 1980
- Sheila Young, 1988

=== 1990s ===
- Herb Adderley, 1996
- Sparky Anderson, 1992
- Carl Angelo, 1994
- Terry Barr, 1995
- Red Berenson, 1996
- Cloyce Box, 1991
- Scotty Bowman, 1999
- Wally Burkemo, 1990
- Bob Carey, 1990
- Paul Carey, 1992
- Don Coleman, 1997
- Chuck Daly, 1996
- James David, 1997
- Dick Enberg, 1995
- Al Fracassa, 1999
- Eddie Futch, 1997
- Kirk Gibson, 1999
- Leon Hart, 1997
- Spencer Haywood, 1993
- Thomas Hearns, 1997
- Dave Hill, 1996
- Mike Hill, 1994
- Gordon Johncock, 1992
- Magic Johnson, 1998
- Vinnie Johnson, 1997
- Leonard "Red" Kelly, 1998
- Micki King, 1993
- Harvey Kuenn, 1993
- Bill Laimbeer, 1999
- Ray Lane, 1997
- Eddie Lubanski, 1992
- Budd Lynch, 1994
- Bruce Martyn, 1996
- Ron Mason, 1994
- Charlie Maxwell, 1997
- Barney McCosky, 1995
- Reggie McKenzie, 1994
- Denny McLain, 1991
- Bob Miller, 1999
- Van Patrick, 1991
- Roger Penske, 1999
- Bob Reynolds, 1998
- Robin Roberts, 1999
- Sugar Ray Robinson, 1991
- Cazzie Russell, 1991
- Charlie Sanders, 1990
- Hal Schram, 1990
- Bubba Smith, 1993
- Billy Sims, 1990
- Mickey Stanley, 1994
- Emanuel Steward, 1996
- Isiah Thomas, 1998
- Rudy Tomjanovich, 1995
- Ty Tyson, 1996
- Franklin "Muddy" Waters, 1992
- George Webster, 1998

=== 2000s ===
- Jim Abbott, 2004
- Kathy Arendsen, 2003
- Jane "Peaches" Bartkowicz, 2002
- Greg Barton, 2007
- Frank Beckmann, 2007
- George Blaha, 2008
- Gates Brown, 2002
- Henry Carr, 2000
- Anthony Carter, 2000
- Lou Creekmur, 2003
- William Davidson, 2004
- Joe DeLamielleure, 2004
- Herb Deromedi, 2004
- Jim Devellano, 2006
- Leo Diegel, 2005
- Dan Dierdorf, 2001
- Dave Diles, 2006
- Joe Dumars, 2003
- Bump Elliott, 2002
- Joe Falls, 2000
- Bill Flemming, 2008
- William Clay Ford Sr., 2005
- Steve Fraser, 2008
- George Gervin, 2001
- Sonny Grandelius, 2006
- Jerry Green, 2003
- Jud Heathcote, 2000
- John Herrington, 2001
- Desmond Howard, 2007
- Mike Ilitch, 2004
- Ron Johnson, 2005
- Jim Kaat, 2002
- Greg Kelser, 2007
- Johnny Kline, 2005
- Paul Krause, 2005
- Julie Krone, 2005
- Diane Laffey, 2006
- Pat LaFontaine, 2004
- Mike Lucci, 2004
- Dan Majerle, 2006
- J. P. McCarthy, 2001
- Jack McCloskey, 2006
- Jack Morris, 2001
- Jack Moss, 2005
- Shirley Muldowney, 2003
- Jim Northrup, 2000
- Lance Parrish, 2002
- Calvin Peete, 2005
- George Perles, 2005
- Billy Pierce, 2003
- George Puscas, 2004
- Glen Rice, 2007
- H. G. Salsinger, 2002
- Barry Sanders, 2003
- Clark Scholes, 2007
- Ray Scott, 2007
- Chris Spielman, 2004
- Fred Stabley, 2004
- Turkey Stearnes, 2007
- Black Jack Stewart, 2000
- Frank Tanana, 2006
- Alan Trammell, 2000
- Norm Ullman, 2007
- Brad Van Pelt, 2002
- Wayne Walker, 2001
- Sam Washington, 2007
- Lou Whitaker, 2000
- George Yardley, 2001
- Steve Yzerman, 2007

=== 2010s ===
- George Acker Jr., 2012
- Mitch Albom, 2017
- George Allen, 2012
- Fred Arbanas, 2012
- B. J. Armstrong, 2018
- Harry Atkins, 2019
- Carl Banks, 2011
- Bob Becker, 2010
- Chuck Bernard, 2012
- Jerome Bettis, 2011
- Jim Brandstatter, 2014
- Lomas Brown, 2013
- Ed Budde, 2012
- Lloyd Carr, 2011
- Rex Cawley, 2012
- Bob Chappuis, 2012
- Daedra Charles-Furrow, 2018
- Mateen Cleaves, 2013
- Charlie Coles, 2018
- Tom D'Eath, 2012
- Bob Devaney, 2012
- Dorne Dibble, 2014
- Diane Dietz, 2019
- T. J. Duckett, 2018
- Tony Dungy, 2013
- Doug English, 2015
- Sergei Fedorov, 2015
- Dan Fife, 2019
- Cullen Finnerty, 2018
- Tom Gage, 2016
- Jason Hanson, 2014
- Willie Hernández, 2012
- Pete Hovland, 2016
- Mark Howe, 2013
- Carol Hutchins, 2011
- Marian Ilitch, 2010
- Tom Izzo, 2015
- Jon Jansen, 2017
- Derek Jeter, 2016
- Richie Jordan, 2012
- Peter Karmanos, 2010
- Greg Kampe, 2017
- Dick Kimball, 2013
- Vladimir Konstantinov, 2019
- Alexi Lalas, 2014
- Barry Larkin, 2015
- Rick Leach, 2010
- Dick LeBeau, 2011
- Jim Leyland, 2017
- Nicklas Lidström, 2014
- Eugene Lipscomb, 2012
- Earl Lloyd, 2012
- John Long, 2016
- Dean Look, 2017
- Tom Mach, 2014
- Meg Mallon, 2010
- Bob Mann, 2016
- Barbara Marchetti-DeSchepper, 2012
- Mick McCabe, 2018
- Kathy McGee, 2016
- Pamela McGee, 2013
- Greg Meyer, 2011
- Mike Modano, 2015
- Herman Moore, 2010
- Eddie Murray, 2010
- Mike O'Hara, 2019
- Chris Osgood, 2016
- Milt Pappas, 2012
- Morris Peterson, 2019
- Robert Porcher, 2018
- Charlie Primas, 2012
- Marcel Pronovost, 2012
- Andre Rison, 2017
- Jalen Rose, 2017
- Dan Roundfield, 2012
- Jack Roush, 2010
- Allison Schmitt, 2019
- Brendan Shanahan, 2016
- Aleta Sill, 2015
- Ted Simmons, 2012
- Ralph Simpson, 2012
- John Smoltz, 2014
- Kate Sobrero-Markgraf, 2018
- John Spring, 2011
- Steve Smith, 2013
- Bob Strampe, 2012
- Sheila Taormina, 2015
- Ron Thompson, 2011
- Jon Urbanchek, 2010
- Chet Walker, 2012
- Ben Wallace, 2016
- Bill Watson, 2012
- Tyrone Wheatley, 2013
- Tom Wilson, 2019
- Alex Wojciechowicz, 2012
- Charles Woodson, 2019

=== 2020s ===
- Shane Battier, 2020
- Kathy Beauregard, 2022
- John Beilein, 2022
- Chauncey Billups, 2020
- Chris Chelios, 2025
- Rick Comley, 2023
- Mark Dantonio, 2025
- Meryl Davis & Charlie White, 2022
- Dave Dombrowski, 2025
- Braylon Edwards, 2024
- Mike Emrick, 2023
- Tony Esposito, 2024
- Cecil Fielder, 2024
- Larry Foote, 2024
- Antonio Gates, 2022
- Richard Hamilton, 2023
- Jim Harbaugh, 2024
- Ken Holland, 2024
- Colleen Howe, 2023
- Calvin Johnson, 2020
- Margo Jonker, 2020
- Tom Kowalski, 2020
- Jake Long, 2024
- John Lowe, 2025
- Ryan Miller, 2023
- Deanna Nolan, 2024
- Mickey Redmond, 2022
- Shawn Respert, 2024
- Jason Richardson, 2025
- Dawn Riley, 2023
- Jennie Ritter, 2022
- Iván Rodríguez, 2024
- Sierra Romero, 2023
- Pete Schmidt, 2020
- Mary Schroeder, 2020
- Don Shane, 2024
- Claressa Shields, 2025
- Rasheed Wallace, 2025
- Chris Webber, 2022
- Lorenzo White, 2023
- Jordyn Wieber, 2020
- Ralph Wilson, 2020
- LaMarr Woodley, 2023
- Henrik Zetterberg, 2023

== Michigan Sports Hall of Fame Cup ==
The Hall of Fame sponsors the Michigan Sports Hall of Fame Cup, a trophy given to the winner of the season basketball series between Oakland University and the University of Detroit Mercy men's basketball teams. The inaugural trophy, established in 2015, was won by the 2014–15 Oakland Golden Grizzlies men's basketball team. The teams split the season series, but Oakland won the tiebreaker due to having a better Rating Percentage Index (RPI) ranking at the time of the game.

Year	Winner	Summary
2015	Oakland	Series tied 1–1; OU wins via RPI
2016	Oakland	Oakland 2–0
2017	Oakland	Series tied 1–1; OU wins via RPI
