= Charles Woods =

Charles Woods may refer to:

- Charles Woods (politician) (1920–2004), Alabama businessman, broadcaster and aspiring politician
- Charles Albert Woods (1852–1925), U.S. federal judge
- Charles R. Woods (1827–1885), United States Army officer and Union general during the American Civil War
- Charles Woods (filmmaker), Australian film director of the silent era
- Charles Woods (cricketer, born 1878) (1878–1940), English cricketer
- Charles Woods (Surrey cricketer) (1810–1885), English cricketer
- Charles Woods (American football) (born 2000), American football player
- Charlie Woods (footballer) (Charles Morgan Parkinson Woods, born 1941), English footballer

== See also ==
- Charles Wood (disambiguation)
