= Thomas Wode (disambiguation) =

Thomas Wode was an English judge and MP for Wallingford.

Thomas Wode may also refer to:

- Thomas Wode (MP), English politician

== See also ==
- Thomas Wood (disambiguation)
