= Harry Wood =

Harry Wood may refer to:

- Harry Blanshard Wood (1882–1924), English recipient of the Victoria Cross
- Harry Edwin Wood (1881–1946), South African astronomer
- Harry Wood (athlete) (1902–1975), British long-distance runner
- Henry Wood (cricketer, born 1853) (1853–1919), Henry "Harry" Wood, English cricketer
- Harry Wood (footballer, born 1868) (1868–1951), England international footballer
- Harry Wood (footballer, born 2002), English footballer for Shelbourne FC
- Harry Wood (Manitoba politician)
- Harry E. Wood (1926–2009), United States federal judge
- Harry O. Wood (1879–1958), American seismologist who updated the Mercalli Intensity Scale
- Harry Wood (baseball) (1885–1955), American baseball player
- Harry Wood (aviator) (1894–1959), World War I flying ace
- Harry Harvey Wood (1903–1977), Scottish literary and artistic figure, co-founder of the Edinburgh International Festival

== See also ==
- Henry Wood (disambiguation)
- Harold Wood (disambiguation)
- Harry Woods (disambiguation)
