= Harold Wood (disambiguation) =

Harold Wood is a suburban development in the London Borough of Havering.

Harold Wood may also refer to:

Landmarks in Harold Wood:

- Harold Wood railway station, a railway station at Harold Wood in the London Borough of Havering in east London
- Harold Wood Hospital, a hospital in London, United Kingdom

== People ==
- Harold Wood (weightlifter) (1889–1954), British Olympic weightlifter
- Harold Wood (minister) (1896–1989), Australian Uniting Church minister
- D'Arcy Wood (minister) (Harold D'Arcy Wood, born 1936), his son, minister of the Uniting Church in Australia
- Harold Wood (aviator) (1902–1980), English aviator and test pilot
- Harold Kenneth Wood (1906–1972), U.S. federal judge
- Harry Wood (athlete) (1902–1975), English marathon runner

== See also ==
- Harry Wood (disambiguation)
