= Charles Wood =

Charles Wood may refer to:

== Arts and entertainment ==
- Charles Erskine Scott Wood (1852–1944), American author, activist, and attorney
- Charles Osgood Wood III (1933–2024), radio and television commentator, writer, and musician, known professionally as Charles Osgood
- Charles Wood (composer) (1866–1926), Irish composer and teacher
- Charles Wood (actor) (1916–1978), American singer and actor in Broadway musicals
- Charles Wood (playwright) (1932–2020), British playwright and screenwriter
- Charlie Wood (musician), American singer, songwriter and keyboardist
- Charlie Wood, English bassist for Pale Waves
- Charlie Wood, cofounder of the Northern Cree Singers

== Politics ==
- Charles Wood, 1st Viscount Halifax (1800–1885), English politician
- Charles Wood, 2nd Viscount Halifax (1839–1934), English politician
- Charles Wood, 2nd Earl of Halifax (1912–1980), British politician and peer

== Sports ==
- Charles Wood (jockey) (1855–1945), British jockey
- Charles Winter Wood (1869–1953), football coach for Tuskegee University Golden Tigers
- Charles Wood (footballer, born 1851) (1851–1923), FA Cup winner for the Royal Engineers A.F.C.
- Charlie Wood (footballer) (born 2002), English footballer

== Other ==
- Charles Wood (businessman) (1914–2004), American businessman
- Charles Wood (ironmaster) (1702–1774), British chemist
- Charles A. Wood, American planetary scientist
- Charles Carroll Wood (1876–1899), Canadian military officer
- Charles Chatworthy Wood Taylor (1792–1856), English artist and engineer, designer of the coat of arms of Chile
- Charles H. Wood (1837–1917), British chemist
- Charles Thorold Wood (1777–1852), English ornithologist

== See also ==
- Charles Woods (disambiguation)
