= Andrew Wood =

Andrew or Andy Wood may refer to:

- Sir Andrew Wood of Largo (died 1515), Scottish admiral
- Andrew Wood (bishop) (died 1695), Scottish prelate, bishop of the Isles, 1678–1680, bishop of Caithness, 1680–1688/9
- Andrew Wood (surgeon) (1810–1881), Scottish surgeon
- Andrew Trew Wood (1826–1903), Canadian businessman and parliamentarian
- Andrew T. Wood (1834–1915), American lawyer and politician from Kentucky
- Sir Andrew Wood (diplomat) (born 1940), British diplomat
- Andy Wood (historian) (born 1967), British social historian
- Andrew Wood (singer) (1966–1990), American lead singer of Mother Love Bone and Malfunkshun
- Andy Wood (comedian) (born 1977), American comedian and producer

== See also ==
- Andrew Woods (disambiguation)
