= George Puscas (sports writer) =

American sportswriter

- Born: April 8, 1927; Detroit, Michigan, United States
- Died: April 25, 2008 (aged 81); Pontiac, Michigan, United States
- Occupation: Sportswriter/columnist
- Employer: Detroit Free Press (1941–2000)
- Spouse: Delphine Constance (Banka) Puscas

George Puscas (Romanian: Puşcaş; April 8, 1927 – April 25, 2008) was an American sports writer for the Detroit Free Press. He joined the Free Press as a copyboy in September 1941 at age 14, was a full-time sports writer until 1992, and continued to be associated with the paper as a columnist until 2006.

Puscas was born in Detroit in 1927. His father Nicholas (Nicolae) Puscas was a grocer on Detroit's east side. After working at the Free Press as a teenager, Puscas joined the military during World War II.

Puscas had his first byline with the Free Press in October 1946. In his first few years with the paper, he was a student at Wayne University, and he covered the Wayne Tartars, University of Detroit, Lawrence Institute of Technology, and Detroit high school athletic events.

When the Fort Wayne Pistons moved to Detroit in 1957, Puscas was assigned to the team's beat. Puscas also began handling the Detroit Lions beat for the Free Press in 1957.

Puscas' "Love Letters", a weekly column in which Puscas responded with humor to letters from readers, began running in the Free Press in June 1959 and continued for nearly 50 years. In his obituary of Puscas, Matt Fiorito wrote that reader letters "were answered cryptically, acerbically, sarcastically and wittily by Puscas, and readers loved it."

Puscas was inducted into the Michigan Sports Hall of Fame in 2004. In his last column, on May 9, 2006, Puscas wrote: "So this is it. That's all there is. Nothing left. Nothing left to do, nothing left to say. All done. Sixty-five years' worth. Imagine that." In his later years, Puscas lived in Beverly Hills, Michigan. He died in 2008 of congestive heart failure at St. Joseph Mercy Hospital in Pontiac; he was 81 years old when he died.

== Selected stories by George Puscas ==
- "Nothing to Bark About: Snobbish Dog Just Sniffs at Scribe", February 29, 1948
- "Duffy Spurns Texas Gold for 'Love of MSU'", December 12, 1957
- "Weep for a Child of Tragedy: Another Sad Chapter Is Written in Bratton Story", January 14, 1962, story about boxer Johnny Bratton, reprinted in Negro Digest, April 1962
- "Travelin' Music for Karras: Jackie Gleason of Lions?", November 28, 1962
