= Alice Wood =

Alice Wood may refer to:

- Alice Robinson Boise Wood (1846–1919), classicist and poet
- Alice Lloyd (actress) (1873–1949), born Alice Wood, British music hall artist
- Alice Barnes (born 1995), later Alice Wood, English racing cyclist
- Alice Wood (Emmerdale), fictional character introduced in 1989

== See also ==
- Alice Woods (disambiguation)
