= Quality start =

Baseball statistic

In baseball, a quality start (QS) is a statistic for a starting pitcher defined as a game in which the pitcher completes at least six innings and permits no more than three earned runs. The quality start was developed by sportswriter John Lowe in 1985 while writing for The Philadelphia Inquirer. He wrote that it "shows exactly how many times a baseball pitcher has done his job."

The quality start was created to be an accurate measure of a starting pitcher's performance. However, the implied earned run average (ERA) of a minimum quality start has been criticized, with Tim McCarver noting "three runs for six innings ... means the ERA would be 4.50 ... Rubbish."

== MLB quality start leaders ==
This section lists quality start leaders in Major League Baseball (MLB). ESPN.com includes quality starts in its "Stat Leaders" section, and terms a loss suffered by a pitcher in a quality start as a "tough loss" and a win earned by a pitcher in a non-quality start a "cheap win". Baseball-Reference.com also includes quality starts, tough losses, and cheap wins for individual pitchers under Pitching-Advanced Stats-Starting Pitching. However, quality starts are absent from statistics provided on other baseball reference sites, such as most baseball cards, and Baseball Almanac.

=== Other notable accomplishments ===
As of the end of the 2014 season, the highest "quality start" percentage for a given season in the live-ball era (post-1920) was recorded by Greg Maddux, who had 24 of them in 25 games in 1994. Dwight Gooden was 33-for-35 in 1985.

Since 1913, numerous pitchers have thrown quality starts of over twenty games, with ten pitchers throwing at least 21 quality starts from 1913 to 2016, albeit with exceptions. Walter Johnson (September 14, 1914 to July 6, 1915) and Eddie Cicotte (September 15, 1916 to July 25, 1917) each had over 24 quality starts, but they also made spot appearances in relief for their teams (i.e. not starting 24 in a row). Bob Gibson, however, set a new high mark with 26 quality starts in a row (no relief appearances) from September 12, 1967 to July 30, 1968. Jacob deGrom tied Gibson by throwing 26 quality starts from May 18, 2018 to April 3, 2019, with 24 of them being done in the same season that set a record for most quality starts in a season previously set by Gibson (22) and Chris Carpenter (22, 2005). In 2022, American League, Framber Valdez pitched 25 quality starts in a row from April 25 to September 18 of the 2022 season. It set a new record for most consecutive quality starts in one season along with the most by a left-handed pitcher.

From 1871 to the end of the 2025 MLB season, the overall leaders by percentage (min. 100 starts):

1. Jeff Tesreau (149 of 207, 72.0%)
2. Babe Ruth (105 of 147, 70.7%)
3. Ernie Shore (85 of 121, 70.2%)
4. Tom Seaver (454 of 647, 70.2%)
5. Pete Schneider (109 of 157, 69.4%)
6. Mel Stottlemyre (247 of 356, 69.4%)
7. Jacob deGrom (171 of 248, 69.0%)
8. Bob Gibson (328 of 482, 68.0%)
9. Spud Chandler (124 of 184, 67.4%)
10. Randy Johnson (403 of 603, 66.8%)

== Criticisms ==
=== High ERA ===
An early criticism of the statistic, made by Moss Klein, writing in The Sporting News, is that a pitcher could conceivably meet the minimum requirements for a quality start and record a 4.50 ERA, which is generally seen as undesirable. Bill James addressed this in his 1987 Baseball Abstract, saying the hypothetical example (a pitcher going exactly 6 innings and allowing exactly 3 runs) was extremely rare among starts recorded as quality starts, and that he doubted any pitchers had an ERA over 3.20 in their quality starts. This was later confirmed through computer analysis of all quality starts recorded from 1984 to 1991, which found that the average ERA in quality starts during that time period was 1.91. However, this criticism has persisted; in 2022, John Laghezza of The Athletic deemed the quality start "garbage", while proposing alternatives (the "money start" and the "plus start").

=== Complete games ===
Another criticism against the statistic is that it is not beneficial for pitchers who pitch many innings per start. If a pitcher allows three earned runs in six innings, he gets a quality start with an ERA of 4.50 for that game. But if a pitcher pitches for nine innings and allows four earned runs, he would have a 4.00 ERA, but would not get a quality start. Former pitcher Carl Erskine said "in my day, a quality start was a complete game ... you gave everybody a day's rest."

That the category is more reliable in the aggregate can be seen with countervailing individual examples, such as the ones listed by Sports Illustrated writer Joe Posnanski in a 2011 piece on the subject:

"In July 2000, Mark Mulder went 6 2/3 innings, gave up 15 hits and nine runs — but only two were earned, so that was classified as a quality start.
In June 1997, Randy Johnson struck out 19 in a complete game but allowed four runs. That was not a quality start.
In July 1982, Mike Scott allowed seven hits and walked five in six innings, did not strike out anybody, gave up seven runs, but only three of those were earned. Quality start.
In April 1974, Gaylord Perry went 15 innings and allowed four runs. Not a quality start."

On the other hand, in the 21st century, team management has increasingly looked upon complete games with disfavor due to the clear and convincing evidence that a pitcher left in the game for more than six or perhaps seven innings is both less effective and at substantially increased risk of injury. Today, a manager is widely expected to pull his starting pitcher once he reaches his pitch count limit, no matter how well he is pitching. This managerial caution reached an unprecedented new standard in 2022 when the Dodgers' Clayton Kershaw (who had an abbreviated spring training) was pulled after pitching a perfect game through seven innings, and only 80 pitches. The Dodgers' manager, Dave Roberts, had also pulled Rich Hill in 2016 after his own seven-inning perfect game bid, due to an injury precaution on Hill's throwing hand. Both perfect game bids were broken up later on, and there has yet to be a combined perfect game.

=== Alternatives ===
Nolan Ryan has used the term "high quality start" for games where the pitcher goes seven innings or more and allows three earned runs or fewer, which baseball columnist and former BBWAA president Derrick Goold referred to as "quality start plus".

Dayn Perry of CBS Sports suggested what he calls the "dominant start". This stat would award a pitcher with a dominant start if he goes at least eight innings, and allows no more than one run, earned or unearned. Perry argues that this stat would better show which pitchers are truly the best in all of baseball.

John Laghezza of The Athletic has offered two proposals:

- The "money start" (QS$) – seven or more innings pitched with no more than two runs allowed.
- The "plus start" (QS+) – same as quality start while excluding starts where the pitcher allowed three earned runs in fewer than seven innings. Starts of at least six innings, but fewer than seven innings, would still qualify when no more than two earned runs were allowed (two earned runs in six innings is an ERA of 3.00). Under this proposal, the highest ERA would be 3.86 (three earned runs in seven innings).
