= Michael Woods =

Michael Woods may refer to:

- Michael Woods (Australian politician) (1857–1934), member of the Queensland Legislative Assembly
- Michael Woods (comics), American writer/editor of comic books
- Michael Woods (cyclist) (born 1986), Canadian cyclist
- Michael Woods (DJ), UK electronic music producer
- Michael Woods (footballer, born 1990), English footballer
- Michael Woods (Irish politician) (born 1935), Irish Fianna Fáil politician
- Michael Woods (Maltese footballer) (born 1962), Maltese footballer and manager
- Michael Woods (organist) (fl. 1565–1569), English organist
- Michael Woods (The Only Way Is Essex)
- Mike Woods (American football) (1954–2009), American football player
- Mike Woods (Australian footballer) (born 1926), footballer for Melbourne
- Mike Woods (speed skater) (born 1952), American Olympic speed skater
- Michael Woods II (born 2000), American football wide receiver

== See also ==
- Michael Wood (disambiguation)
- Woods (surname)
