= LaMarr Woodley =

American football player (born 1984)

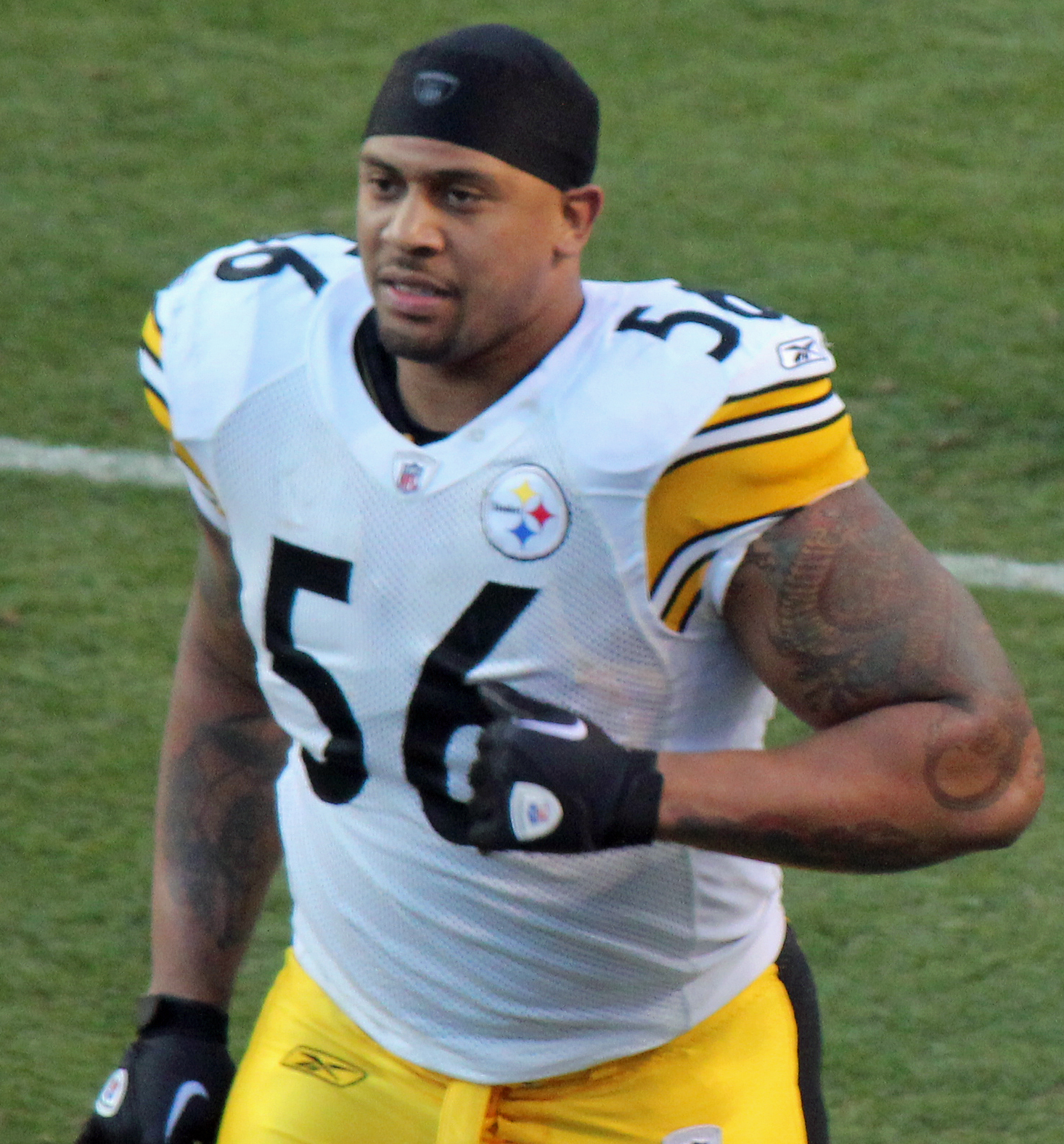
- Woodley with the Pittsburgh Steelers in 2012

No. 56, 58
- Position: Linebacker

Personal information
- Born: November 3, 1984 (age 42); Saginaw, Michigan, U.S.
- Listed height: 6 ft 2 in (1.88 m)
- Listed weight: 265 lb (120 kg)

Career information
- High school: Saginaw
- College: Michigan (2003–2006)
- NFL draft: 2007: 2nd round, 46th overall pick

Career history
- Pittsburgh Steelers (2007–2013); Oakland Raiders (2014); Arizona Cardinals (2015)

Awards and highlights
- Super Bowl champion (XLIII); Second-team All-Pro (2009); Pro Bowl (2009); PFWA All-Rookie Team (2007); Lombardi Award (2006); Ted Hendricks Award (2006); Big Ten Defensive Player of the Year (2006); Big Ten Defensive Lineman of the Year (2006); Unanimous All-American (2006); Rose Bowl Defensive MVP (2005); First-team All-Big Ten (2006); Second-team All-Big Ten (2004); Michigan Sports Hall of Fame (2023)

Career NFL statistics
- Total tackles: 319
- Sacks: 58.0
- Forced fumbles: 9
- Fumble recoveries: 9
- Interceptions: 5
- Defensive touchdowns: 3
- Stats at Pro Football Reference

LaMarr Dewayne Woodley (born November 3, 1984) is an American former professional football player who was a linebacker in the National Football League (NFL). He played college football at the University of Michigan, earning unanimous All-American honors. He was selected by the Pittsburgh Steelers in the second round of the 2007 NFL draft. In his second season, he won Super Bowl XLIII as a member of the Steelers. Woodley also played for the Arizona Cardinals and Oakland Raiders.

== Early life ==
Woodley was born and raised in Saginaw, Michigan. While in high school, Woodley teamed with former Detroit Lions wide receiver Charles Rogers and former Chicago Bulls point guard Anthony Roberson on Saginaw High School's football team in 1999 to win Michigan's Division II state championship.

Considered a five-star recruit by Rivals.com, Woodley was listed as the third best inside linebacker in the nation in 2003.

== College career ==
Woodley enrolled at the University of Michigan. He predominantly played defensive end and sometimes linebacker, depending on the front seven's alignment. In 2006, Woodley was named the defensive captain of the Wolverines by his teammates. He collected 12 sacks as a senior and won the Lombardi Award as the best lineman, offensive or defensive, in the country. T-shirts were created by Dave Peabody of the blog Michigan Against the World and sold in Ann Arbor with the slogan, "Guns don't kill people. LaMarr Woodley kills people." His 12 sacks led the Big Ten conference, and it ranked 8th in the nation. Following his senior season in 2006, Woodley was a first-team All-Big Ten selection, and was recognized as a unanimous All-American. He earned a master's degree in sport management studies through the Global Online program at California University of Pennsylvania, a public university about 35 miles from Pittsburgh.

=== National awards ===
- Unanimous first-team All-American (2006)
- Ted Hendricks Award (2006)
- Chuck Bednarik Award finalist (2006)
- Lott Trophy quarterfinalist (2006)
- Bronko Nagurski Trophy watchlist (2006)
- Outland Trophy watchlist (2006)
- Michigan Sports Hall of Fame inductee (2023)

=== Conference honors ===
- First-team All-Big Ten (2006)
- Second-team All-Big Ten (2004)
- Honorable mention All-Big Ten (2005)
- Big Ten Defensive Player of the Year (2006)
- Big Ten Defensive Lineman of the Year (2006)

== Professional career ==
Pre-draft measurables
Height	Weight	Arm length	Hand span	40-yard dash	10-yard split	20-yard split	20-yard shuttle	Vertical jump	Broad jump	Bench press
6 ft 1 1/2 in (1.87 m)	266 lb (121 kg)	35 1/4 in (0.90 m)	9 5/8 in (0.24 m)	4.74 s	1.65 s	2.72 s	4.42 s	38.5 in (0.98 m)	9 ft 9 in (2.97 m)	29 reps
All values from NFL Combine/Pro Day

=== Pittsburgh Steelers ===
Woodley was selected by the Pittsburgh Steelers in the second round with the 46th overall pick of the 2007 NFL draft. He originally wore Joey Porter's old number, 55, throughout training camp, but after Steelers' center Chukky Okobi was cut, he took Okobi's old number, 56. He recorded his first sack in his second NFL game, as he sacked Buffalo Bills quarterback J. P. Losman in the fourth quarter of Pittsburgh's 26–3 win over Buffalo. He recorded his second sack in three games, against Alex Smith of the San Francisco 49ers, in the fourth quarter of the Steelers' Week 3 37–16 win against the 49ers. In the 2008 season he was expected to start at the outside linebacker position left vacant when the Steelers let former starter Clark Haggans sign with the Arizona Cardinals. In Week 1 of the 2008 NFL season, Woodley was named GMC Defensive Player of the Week. He recorded three tackles, a sack, an interception, a defended pass, and a fumble recovery in his first career start. In Week 4 of the 2008 NFL season he recorded his first professional touchdown on a fumble recovery against the Baltimore Ravens. He finished the season with 11.5 sacks. In 2008, the Steelers won their division over the Ravens by one game, with a 12–4 record sending them to the playoffs.

After defeating the San Diego Chargers 35–24 in the divisional round, they outlasted their division rivals, the Baltimore Ravens, 23–14 to advance to Super Bowl XLIII. With two sacks in both the divisional round and Conference Championship, Woodley became the first player in NFL history to record three consecutive multi-sack playoff games, dating back to the Steelers' 31–29 loss to the Jacksonville Jaguars in the wild-card round of the 2008 playoffs. In Super Bowl XLIII, Woodley extended this streak to four games when he sacked Kurt Warner twice, forcing the game-ending fumble on Arizona Cardinals quarterback Kurt Warner with 5 seconds remaining in the game to secure the win.

In 2009, he recorded 62 tackles, 13.5 sacks, 1 forced fumble and 1 fumble recovery, which he returned for a touchdown. He was named to his first Pro Bowl for his outstanding performance. He is a member of the Air Jordan brand.

In 2010, Woodley had 50 tackles, 10.0 sacks, an interception (which he ran back for a touchdown), two pass deflections, three forced fumbles and two fumble recoveries.

At the end of the 2010 season, Woodley and the Steelers appeared in Super Bowl XLV against the Green Bay Packers. He was a starter in the game, recording three total tackles and a sack in the 31–25 loss. He was ranked 82nd by his fellow players on the NFL Top 100 Players of 2011. After the lockout during the following offseason, Woodley signed a six-year, $61.5 million contract, the largest contract the Steelers ever gave to a defensive player.

During the 2011 season, Woodley missed six games with a hamstring injury and accordingly only recorded 39 tackles and 9.0 sacks. However, during the four game period when James Harrison (his OLB partner and Steelers primary pass rusher) was injured, Woodley moved into Harrison's role and greatly improved his performance, recording 7.5 sacks during those four games. He was voted 63rd best player of the 2011 season by NFL players.

On December 15, 2013, the Steelers placed Woodley on the season ending IR due to a calf injury. At the time, he had 5 sacks, and 36 tackles in 11 games played in the season.

Woodley was released by the team on March 11, 2014.

=== Oakland Raiders ===
On March 13, 2014, Woodley signed a two-year contract with the Oakland Raiders. He was released by the Raiders after one season.

=== Arizona Cardinals ===
On March 10, 2015, Woodley signed a one-year, $870,000 minimum contract with the Arizona Cardinals. On November 25, 2015, during Week 11's matchup against the Cincinnati Bengals, Woodley suffered a torn pectoral muscle. On November 26, 2015, Woodley was placed on injured reserve.

== NFL career statistics ==
Legend
	Won the Super Bowl
	Led the league
**Bold**	Career high

Year	Team	GP	COMB	TOTAL	AST	SACK	FF	FR	FR YDS	TD	INT	IR YDS	AVG IR	LNG	TD	PD
2007	PIT	13	14	14	0	4.0	1	0	0	0	0	0	0	0	0	0
2008	PIT	15	60	41	**19**	11.5	2	**4**	9	**1**	1	6	6	6	0	2
2009	PIT	16	**62**	**50**	12	**13.5**	1	1	**77**	**1**	0	0	0	0	0	**6**
2010	PIT	16	50	35	15	10.0	**3**	2	19	0	**2**	**22**	**11**	**14**	**1**	5
2011	PIT	10	39	26	13	9.0	0	0	0	0	1	1	1	1	0	2
2012	PIT	13	38	27	11	4.0	1	1	0	0	1	11	**11**	11	0	1
2013	PIT	11	36	20	16	5.0	1	1	0	0	0	0	0	0	0	1
2014	OAK	6	5	3	2	0.0	0	0	0	0	0	0	0	0	0	0
2015	ARI	10	10	9	1	1.0	0	0	0	0	0	0	0	0	0	1
Career		110	319	229	90	58.0	9	9	105	2	5	40	8	14	1	18

== Philanthropy ==
Since the start of his NFL career, Woodley has provided considerable amounts of free supplies to students in his hometown of Saginaw. In January 2012, he donated 100 hooded sweatshirts to the Saginaw High band before its halftime performance at the Sugar Bowl between Michigan and Virginia Tech. Later that year, he started a foundation to coordinate his charitable activities. Shortly after the foundation was formed, Woodley found out that the Saginaw City School District would have to institute a $75-per-student participation fee for high school athletics in the 2012–13 school year due to budget cutbacks. Through his foundation, he donated $60,000 to cover the fees for all athletes in the district—at Saginaw High, Arthur Hill High School, and the city's junior high and middle schools. In 2018, Woodley opened Woodley Leadership Academy, a tuition free K-8 charter school in Saginaw.
