= Thersites =

Mythical Greek soldier in the Trojan War

Thersites lying dead on an Apulian red-figure volute krater, c. 350–40 BC, Museum of Fine Arts, Boston.

In Greek mythology, Thersites (/θɜːrˈsaɪtiːz/; Ancient Greek: Θερσίτης, romanized: Thersítēs) was a soldier of the Greek army during the Trojan War.

== Name ==
The first attestation of this name in Greek could be the Mycenaean Linear B word 𐀵𐀯𐀲, to-si-ta, a word found on the PY Cn 719 tablet.

== Family ==
The Iliad does not mention his father's name, which may suggest that he should be viewed as a commoner rather than an aristocratic hero. However, a quotation from another lost epic in the Trojan cycle, the Aethiopis, names his parents as Agrius of Calydon and Dia, a daughter of King Porthaon, this makes him a first cousin once removed of the Trojan war hero Diomedes.

== Mythology ==
According to Euphorion, the story of Thersites' disfigurement came from the Calydonian Boar Hunt. Thersites had been assigned by Oeneus as a guard to watch for the boar, but he had abandoned his post for a high, safer place. Meleager, annoyed, pursued him, and in his flight, Thersites fell off a cliff.

In some accounts, Thersites, together with his five brothers including Melanippus, overthrew Oeneus from the throne of Calydon and gave the kingdom to Agrius, their father and Oeneus's brother. Later on, they were deposed by Diomedes who reinstated his grandfather Oeneus as king and slew all of Thersites's brothers.

Homer described him in detail in the Iliad, Book II, even though he plays only a minor role in the story. He is said to be bow-legged and lame, to have shoulders that cave inward, and a head which is covered in tufts of hair and comes to a point. This deformity has even given rise to a medical eponym. Vulgar, obscene, and somewhat dull-witted, Thersites disrupts the rallying of the Greek army:

He got up in the assembly and attacked Agamemnon in the words of Achilles [calling him greedy and a coward] ... Odysseus then stood up, delivered a sharp rebuke to Thersites, which he coupled with a threat to strip him naked, and then beat him on the back and shoulders with Agamemnon's sceptre; Thersites doubled over, a warm tear fell from his eye, and a bloody welt formed on his back; he sat down in fear, and in pain gazed helplessly as he wiped away his tear; but the rest of the assembly was distressed and laughed .... There must be a figuration of wickedness as self-evident as Thersites—the ugliest man who came to Troy—who says what everyone else is thinking.

He is not mentioned elsewhere in the Iliad, but it seems that in the lost Aethiopis Achilles eventually killed him by punching him very hard "for having torn out the eyes of the Amazon Penthesilea that the hero had just killed in combat." In the Posthomerica by Quintus Smyrnaeus it is said that Thersites insulted Achilles for his love of Penthesilea, as revenge Achilles killed him. Because of this killing, Diomedes, Thersites' cousin, became enraged, and Achilles was forced to sail to Lesbos, where he made sacrifices to Apollo, Artemis, and Leto before Odysseus purified him of the murder.

In his Posthomerica, John Tzetzes writes that Penthesilea was still barely alive after being hit by the spear of Achilles, and it would be Diomedes, the cousin of Thersites, who killed Penthesileia by throwing her in the river Scamander.

In his Introduction to The Anger of Achilles, Robert Graves speculates that Homer might have made Thersites a ridiculous figure as a way of dissociating himself from him, because his remarks seem entirely justified. This was a way of letting these remarks, along with Odysseus' brutal act of suppression, remain in the record.

== In later literature ==
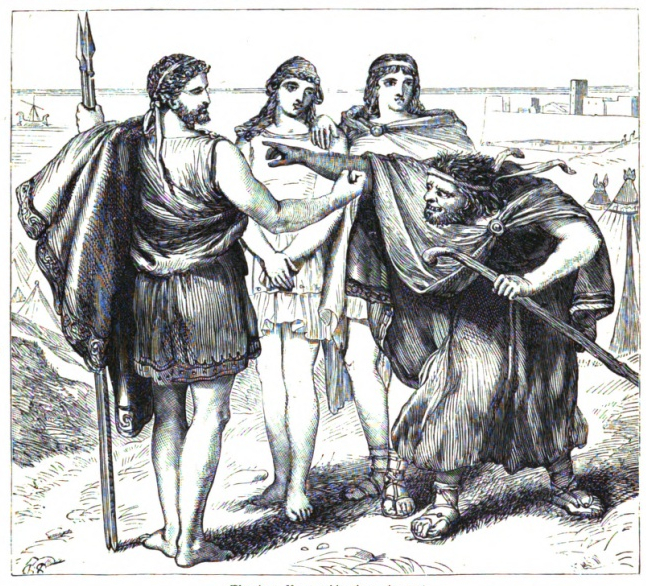
Thersites and Achilles, illustration for Shakespeare's 'Troilus & Cressida'.

Thersites is also mentioned in Plato's Gorgias (525e) as an example of a soul that can be cured in the after-life because of his lack of might; and in The Republic he chooses to be reborn as a nonhuman ape. According to E. R. Dodds, "There he is not so much the typical petty criminal as the typical buffoon; and so Lucian describes him."

The Alexander Romance refers to Thersites when Alexander the Great is claimed to have said that it would be a greater honor to be immortalized in the poetry of Homer, even if only as a minor and detestable character like Thersites, than by the poets of his own day: "I would sooner be a Thersites in Homer than an Agamemnon in your writing". Other recensions replace Agamemnon with Achilles in the comparison.

A New Interlude Called Thersites, an anonymous play from 1537 sometimes attributed to Nicholas Udall, is based on a Latin dialogue by Jean Tixier de Ravisi, a professor of rhetoric at the College of Navarre and rector of the University of Paris from 1520–1524, written under the pen name "J. Ravisius Textor." It is described by Karl J. Holzknecht as "the earliest example of the braggart soldier (miles gloriosus) on the English stage." While derived from plays of Plautus, elements such as combat with a snail ("an old medieval joke, usually at the expense of the Lombards") and an episode in which Telemachus comes to the title character's mother to be cured of worms, are wholly original to this version.

Along with many of the major figures of the Trojan War, Thersites was a character in Shakespeare's Troilus and Cressida (1602) in which he is described as "a deformed and scurrilous Grecian" and portrayed as a comic servant, in the tradition of the Shakespearean fool, but unusually given to abusive remarks to all he encounters. He begins as Ajax's slave, telling Ajax, "I would thou didst itch from head to foot and I had the scratching of thee; I would make thee the loathsomest scab in Greece." Thersites soon leaves Ajax and puts himself into the service of Achilles (portrayed by Shakespeare as a kind of bohemian figure), who appreciates his bitter, caustic humor. Shakespeare mentions Thersites again in his later play Cymbeline, when Guiderius says, "Thersites' body is as good as Ajax' / When neither are alive."

Laurence Sterne writes of Thersites in the last volume of his Tristram Shandy, chapter 14, declaring him to be the exemplar of abusive satire, as black as the ink it is written with.

In Part Two of Goethe's Faust (1832), Act One, during the Masquerade, Thersites appears briefly and criticizes the goings-on. He says, "When some lofty thing is done / I gird at once my harness on. / Up with what's low, what's high eschew, / Call crooked straight, and straight askew". The Herald, who acts as Master of Revels or Lord of Misrule, strikes Thersites with his mace, at which point he metamorphoses into an egg, from which a bat and an adder are hatched.

== As social critic ==
The role of Thersites as a social critic has been advanced by several philosophers and literary critics, including Georg Wilhelm Friedrich Hegel, Friedrich Nietzsche, Edward Said, Thomas Woods and Kenneth Burke. In the passage below from Language as Symbolic Action, Burke cites Hegel's coinage of the term "Thersitism", and he proceeds to describe a version of it as a process by which an author both privileges protest in a literary work but also disguises or disowns it, so as not to distract from the literary form of the work, which must push on toward other effects than the protest per se:

If an audience is likely to feel that it is being crowded into a position, if there is any likelihood that the requirements of dramatic "efficiency" would lead to the blunt ignoring of a possible protest from at least some significant portion of the onlookers, the author must get this objection stated in the work itself. But the objection should be voiced in a way that the same breath disposes of it.

An example of this stratagem is the role of Thersites in the Iliad. For any Greeks who were likely to resent the stupidity of the Trojan War, the text itself provided a spokesman who voiced their resistance. And he was none other than the abominable Thersites, for whom no "right-minded" member of the Greek audience was likely to feel sympathy. As early as Hegel, however, his standard role was beginning to be questioned. Consider, for instance, these remarks in the introduction to Hegel's Lectures on the Philosophy of History:

The Thersites of Homer who abuses the kings is a standing figure for all times. He does not get in every age . . . the blows that he gets in Homer. But his envy, his egotism, is the thorn which he has to carry in his flesh. And the undying worm that gnaws him is the tormenting consideration that his excellent views and vituperations remain absolutely without result in the world. But our satisfaction at the fate of Thersitism may also have its sinister side.

Thersites also appears in the writings of Karl Marx, and those of later Marxist literature in Soviet times much in the spirit of Hegel's construal. Heiner Müller casts Thersites in the role of Shepherd who also shears his sheep reflecting the contradictions broached by Hegel.

... Came the talk in dining, meat and wine, to Thersites
The reviled, the windbag, Homer stood in the gathering
Using wisely the great quarrel for the greater prey, spoke:
See the peoples shepherd who shears his flock and does them in as always does the shepherd,
showed the soldiers bloody and empty, the bloody, empty hands of soldiers.
Then asked the pupils: What is it with this Thersites,
Master? You give him the right words then with your own
Words you put him in the wrong...

== Thersites complex ==
In medicine, the term Thersites complex refers to patients who have a very minor deformity, yet who are extremely anxious about it. They frequently contact surgeons to correct their "highly perceived" deformity. The doctors tend to ignore the complaint and refer them to psychologists and psychiatrists. Psychotherapy, however is often refused, or ineffective.

== Notes and references ==
Notes
