= Mike O'Hara (reporter) =

American sportswriter and columnist

- Born: c. 1946; Michigan, US
- Occupations: Sportswriter; columnist
- Years active: 1966-2024
- Known for: Detroit Lions reporting; Michigan Sports Hall of Fame

Mike O'Hara (born c. 1946) is a retired American sportswriter and columnist for The Detroit News. He worked for the newspaper from 1966-2008 and after retirement he continued reporting for the DetroitLions.com from 2008-2024. He covered the Detroit Lions NFL football team for a total of 47 years. In 2019 he was He inducted into the Michigan Sports Hall of Fame.

== Early life and education ==
He was born c. 1946. In 1963 he graduated from Detroit Pershing High School. O’Hara began as a copy boy with The Detroit News in 1966 and in 1967 he was promoted to the position of sports writer. He did not attend college until the 1990s when he graduated from Wayne State University in Detroit.

== Career ==
O'Hara began as a reporter for The Detroit News in 1967 and he worked for the paper for 42 years. He worked for the newspaper from 1966-2008 and after retirement he continued reporting from the DetroitLions.com until 2024. He covered the NFL's Detroit Lions football team for 47 years. His last day of work for DetroitLions.com was June 10, 2024. At O'Hara's last Detroit Lions press conference he was recognized by Detroit Lion's head coach Dan Campbell. The owner of the Detroit Lions, Sheila Ford Hamp and Lions president Rod Wood both attended the press conference to recognize O'Hara.

In 1969 he was drafted by the United States Army. He served as a photographer with the 20th Engineer Brigade. He was sent to the Vietnam War and spent two years in the Army.

He was inducted into the Michigan Sports Hall of Fame in 2019.
