= Michael Wood =

Michael Wood may refer to:

== Sportspeople ==
- Michael Wood (rugby union) (born 1999), Australian rugby union player
- Mick Wood (footballer, born 1952), English association footballer
- Mick Wood (footballer, born 1962), English association footballer
- Mike Wood (American football) (born 1954), American football player
- Mike Wood (baseball) (born 1980), American baseball player
- Mike Wood (curler) (born 1968), Canadian curler
- Mike Wood (fencer) (born 1971), South African épée fencer
- Mikey Wood (born 1996), English rugby league player

== Others ==
- Michael M. Wood (born 1947), American diplomat and ambassador
- Michael Wood (literary scholar) (born 1936), former chair of the Princeton University English Department
- Michael Wood (cryptographer), American author The Jesus Secret 2010
- Michael Wood (surgeon) (1918–1987), British doctor in East Africa
- Michael Wood (historian) (born 1948), British historian and television presenter
- Michael Wood (lawyer) (born 1947), British lawyer and former chief advisor to the Foreign and Commonwealth Office
- Michael Wood (New Zealand politician) (born 1980), New Zealand member of parliament
- Michael Wood (special effects artist) (1940–2016), American special effects artist
- Mike Wood (Labour politician) (born 1946), British MP for Batley and Spen from 1997 to 2015
- Mike Wood (Conservative politician) (born 1976), British MP since May 2015 (Kingswinford and South Staffordshire, formerly Dudley South)

== See also ==
- Michaelwood services, a motorway service area in the United Kingdom
- Michael Woods (disambiguation)
