= Jane Ash Poitras =

Cree painter and printmaker

- Born: October 11, 1951 (age 74); Fort Chipewyan, Alberta, Canada
- Known for: Painter, Printmaker
- Awards: CM (2017)

Jane Ash Poitras CM RCA LL. D. D.Litt (born October 11, 1951) is a Cree painter and printmaker from Canada. Her work uses the idioms of mainstream art to express the experience of Aboriginal people in Canada.

== Biography ==
Jane Ash Poitras was born in Fort Chipewyan Alberta. Her mother died of tuberculosis when Poitras was six and she was adopted by an elderly German woman. She grew up in Edmonton, Alberta in a Catholic household. Before turning to a career in the arts, she obtained a B.Sc. in microbiology at the University of Alberta. She later obtained a Bachelor of Fine Arts degree in printmaking from the University of Alberta and a Master's from Columbia University.

== Work ==
...each blank canvas is an invitation to a journey of discovery. I may begin with an idea of what the final destination—the completed painting—may be, but I’m always open to the unexpected. As Carl Beam said, the art of placement is a spiritual act. Each step in the creative process may reveal unexpected choices that require decisions. The final decision for each piece is to know when it is resolved, when it is finished.

— Jane Ash Poitras, Jane Ash Poitras: Acclaimed Aboriginal Artist Receives Distinguished Artist Award, First Nation Drum

Poitras uses a vocabulary of layered images, readymades and text to explore the historical and personal experience of an aboriginal person in Canadian society. This approach to creating images was developed out of Dada by the American Abstract Expressionists and their associates; Mark Rothko, Kurt Schwitters, Robert Rauschenberg, and Cy Twombly. Poitras was introduced to this work during her studies at Columbia University.

Poitras extends the meaning of her paintings by applying objects holding symbolic significance to the surface of the compositions. A Sacred Prayer for a Sacred Island, 1991 includes an eagle feather and a five dollar bill. An eagle feather is considered sacred by North American Aboriginal People; the five-dollar bill represents the treaty annuity paid by the Canadian government to aboriginal individuals.

The paintings Poitras creates can be very large. One of the pieces acquired by the Royal Ontario Museum in 2010 is a triptych 25 feet long by 9 feet high. Potato Peeling 101 to Ethnobotany 101 (2004), portrays a narrative of the experience of preserving aboriginal cultural knowledge through the years of forced assimilation.

Poitras maintains an active exhibition schedule, having participated in over 30 solo exhibitions and 60 group exhibitions before 2006. She is a long-standing sessional instructor with the University of Alberta and travels as a guest lecturer across North America.

=== Mentorship ===
Poitras has mentored young apprentice artists of Aboriginal background, including Linus Woods.

== Selected public collections ==
- National Gallery of Canada
- Royal Ontario Museum
- Canadian Museum of Civilization
- Brooklyn Museum
- Canada Council Art Bank
- Leonard and Bina Ellen Art Gallery, Concordia University
- McMichael Canadian Art Collection
- Royal Alberta Museum
- Art Gallery of Ontario
- Edmonton Art Gallery, now known as the Art Gallery of Alberta
- Art Gallery of Nova Scotia
- Vancouver Art Gallery
- Winnipeg Art Gallery
- Glenbow-Alberta Institute, Glenbow Museum
- The Robert McLaughlin Gallery
- MacKenzie Art Gallery
- Agnes Etherington Art Centre
- Art Windsor Essex

== Selected honours ==
- Order of Canada (2017);
- Queen Elizabeth II Diamond Jubilee Medal;
- Honorary Doctor of Laws degree from University of Calgary;
- Honorary Doctor of Letters degree from University of Alberta;
- Royal Canadian Academy of Arts
- Alberta Centennial Medal
- National Aboriginal Achievement Award for Arts and Culture, now the Indspire Awards, 2006
- University of Alberta Alumni Award of Excellence
- Lieutenant Governor of Alberta Distinguished Artist Award
