= Samuel Wood =

Samuel or Sam Wood may refer to:

== Arts and entertainment ==
- Samuel Peploe Wood (1827–1873), English sculptor and painter
- Sam Wood (1884–1949), American film director
- Sam Wood (artist), game artist

== Law and politics ==
- Samuel Wood (Lower Canada politician) (1787–1848), Canadian farmer and political figure
- Samuel Newitt Wood (1825–1891), American politician from Kansas
- Samuel Wood (Ontario politician) (1830–1913), Canadian politician

== Sports ==
- Sam Wood (footballer) (born 1986), English footballer
- Sam Wood (cricketer) (born 1993), English cricketer
- Sam Wood (rugby league, born 1993), English rugby league footballer
- Sam Wood (rugby league, born 1997), English rugby league footballer
- Sam Wood (cricketer, born 2004), English cricketer

== Others ==
- Samuel Wood (philanthropist) (fl. 1831), American Quaker philanthropist; founder of the New York Institute for the Blind
- Samuel H. Wood, American scientist and fertility specialist who cloned himself
- Sam Wood (archaeologist), British archaeologist and TV presenter

== See also ==
- S. A. M. Wood (1823–1891), Confederate Civil War General
- Samuel Woods (disambiguation)
- Sir Samuel Hill-Wood (1872–1949), English cotton magnate, cricketer and politician
- Sam Taylor-Wood (born 1967), English filmmaker, photographer and visual artist
