= Karen Gaffney =

American motivator and philanthropist (born 1977)

- Born: November 3, 1977 (age 48); Mountain View, California, U.S.
- Known for: Advocate for people with disabilities, long distance swimming
- Website: The Karen Gaffney Foundation

Karen Gaffney (born November 3, 1977) is the president of the Karen Gaffney Foundation, a non-profit organization headquartered in Portland, Oregon "dedicated to championing the journey to full inclusion for people with Down Syndrome and other disabilities."

== Biography ==
Gaffney was born in California in 1977. She became the first person with Down syndrome to complete a relay swim of the English Channel in 2001. Her 2007 swim across the nine mile span of Lake Tahoe became the subject of the documentary Crossing Tahoe: A Swimmer's Dream. In 2009, she swam across Boston Harbor, a distance of five miles, to celebrate Down Syndrome Month in Massachusetts. She has also earned two gold medals from the Special Olympics, and completed 16 swims across San Francisco Bay, including the Escape from Alcatraz triathlon. In 2010, she received the Global Down Syndrome Quincy Jones Exceptional Advocacy Award.

Karen Gaffney became the first living person with Down syndrome to receive an honorary doctorate degree when she received an honorary Doctor of Humane Letters degree from the University of Portland on May 5, 2013, for her work in raising awareness regarding the abilities of people who have Down syndrome.

Karen Gaffney graduated from St. Mary's Academy high school in Portland in 1997, and in 2001 she graduated from Portland Community College with an Associate of Science degree and a teacher's aide certificate.
