= Frank Woods =

Frank Woods may refer to:

- Frank E. Woods (1860–1939), screenwriter and one of the 36 founders of Academy of Motion Picture Arts and Sciences
- Frank P. Woods (1868–1944), member of the United States House of Representatives
- Frank Theodore Woods (1874–1932), English Anglican bishop, Bishop of Winchester
- Frank Woods (bishop) (1907–1992), English-born Anglican Archbishop of Melbourne, nephew of Theodore
- Frank Woods (pharmacologist) (1937–2016), British pharmacologist
- Frank Woods (cricketer) (1889–1951), New Zealand cricketer
- MSgt (Master Sergeant). Frank Woods, a recurring character in the Call of Duty: Black Ops series of video games.

== See also ==
- Francis Woods (1819–1894), Canadian businessman and politician
- Francis Charles Woods, American architect and organ builder
- Frank Wood (disambiguation)
