= Tom Wood =

Tom Wood may refer to:

- Tom Wood (actor) (born 1963), American film and television actor, birth name: Thomas Mills Wood
- Tom Wood (photographer) (born 1951), Irish photographer
- Tom Wood (rugby union) (born 1986), English rugby union player
- Tom Wood (visual effects), visual effects supervisor
- Tom Wood (author), British author of thriller novels
- Tom Wood (ice hockey) (1927–2015), Canadian ice hockey player
- Tom Wood (Derbyshire cricketer) (born 1994), English cricketer
- Tom Wood (racing driver) (born 2001), British racing driver

== See also ==
- Thomas Wood (disambiguation)
- Thomas Woods (disambiguation)
