= Pat Wood =

Pat Wood may refer to:

- Pat O'Hara Wood (1891–1961), Australian tennis player
- Patrick H. "Pat" Wood (born 1962), Texas lawyer and government official

== See also ==
- Pat Woods (disambiguation)
- Patrick Wood (born 2002), Australian soccer player
- Patricia Wood (fl. 1970s–2010s), American novelist
