= Portland Community College =

Public college in Portland, Oregon, US

Coordinates: 45.43857°N 122.73093°W

- Type: Public community college
- Established: 1961
- Academic affiliations: Space-grant
- President: Katy Ho (Acting)
- Students: 50,000+
- Location: Portland, Oregon, United States
- Campus: 256 acres (104 ha)
- Colors: Turquoise and Navy
- Mascot: Poppie the Panther
- Website: www.pcc.edu

Portland Community College (PCC) is a public community college in Portland, Oregon, United States. It is the largest post-secondary institution in the state and serves residents in the five-county area of Multnomah, Washington, Yamhill, Clackamas, and Columbia counties. As of the 2021–2022 academic year, PCC enrolls more than 50,000 full-time (40%) and part-time (60%) students.

== History ==
The college was founded in 1961 as an adult education program for the local public school system, operating out of the former Failing Elementary School since 1959 and renamed Portland Community College in 1961. Voters approved the establishment of an independent district for the college in 1968. Amo DeBernardis (1913-2010), former assistant superintendent of Portland Public Schools, was the founding president of the school, serving from 1961 to 1979.

The Cascade Campus opened in North Portland in 1971, and the Rock Creek Campus opened in Washington County in 1976. The district passed a $374 million bond measure in 2008. PCC's $25 million Willow Creek Center opened in 2009 and earned a platinum LEED certification the next year. The Newberg Center opened in October 2011, replacing a temporary arrangement in use for the 2010–11 school year, in which PCC courses were offered at the Chehalem Cultural Center. The center's 13,000-square-foot (1,200 m^{2}) building is a LEED platinum-designed building, the first net zero higher education building in Oregon.

On March 11, 2026, the Portland Community College Federation of Classified Employees (PCCFCE) and the Portland Community College Federation of Faculty and Academic Professionals (PCCFFAP) initiated a strike over pay and benefits. This strike, which began after nearly a year of negotiations, was the first-ever strike for a community college in Oregon's history. The strike significantly disrupted college services. Tentative agreements were reached with the PCCFCE after 15 calendar days, and with the PCCFFAP after 20 calendar days.

== Facilities ==
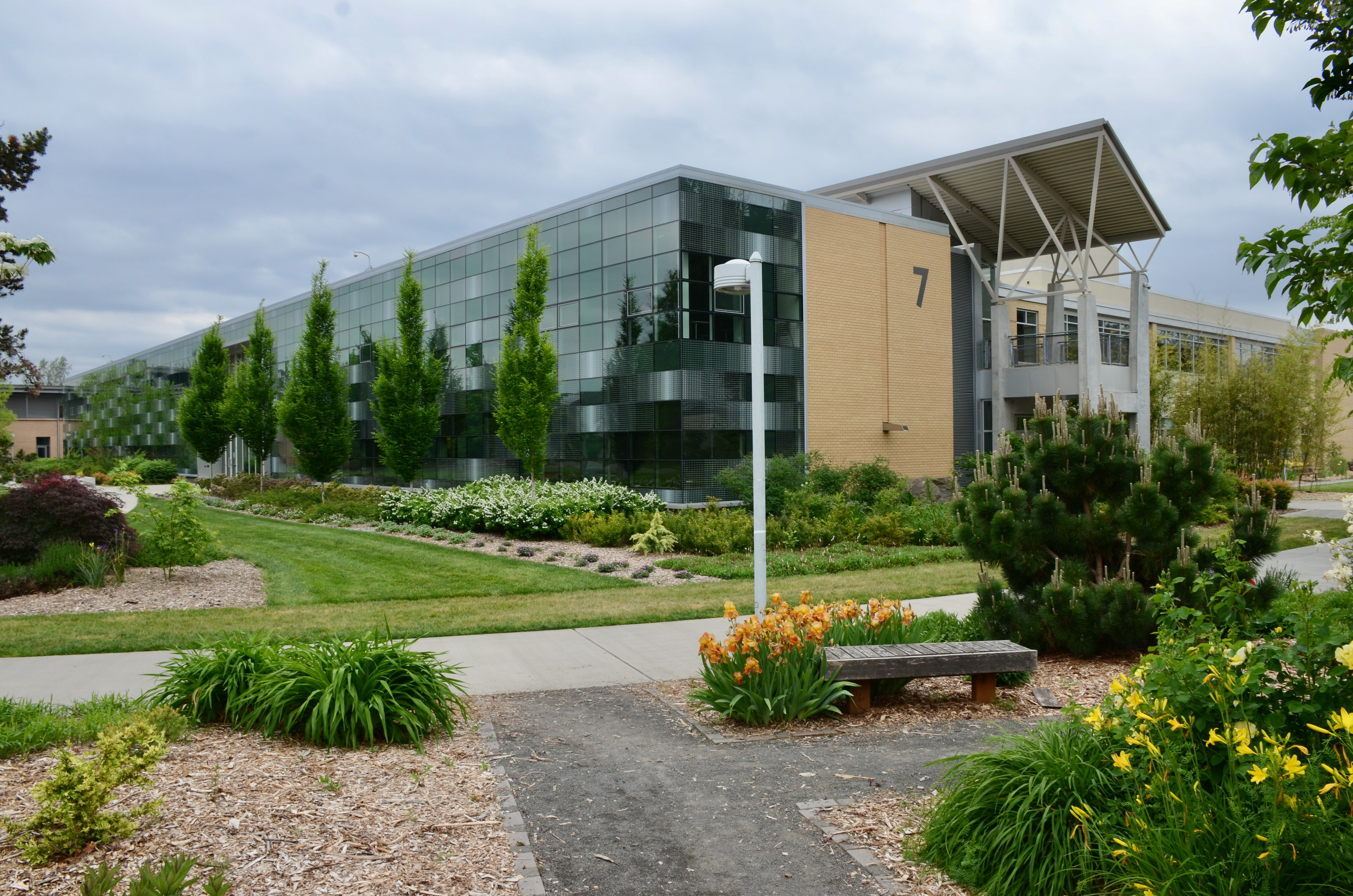
Rock Creek campus, building 7

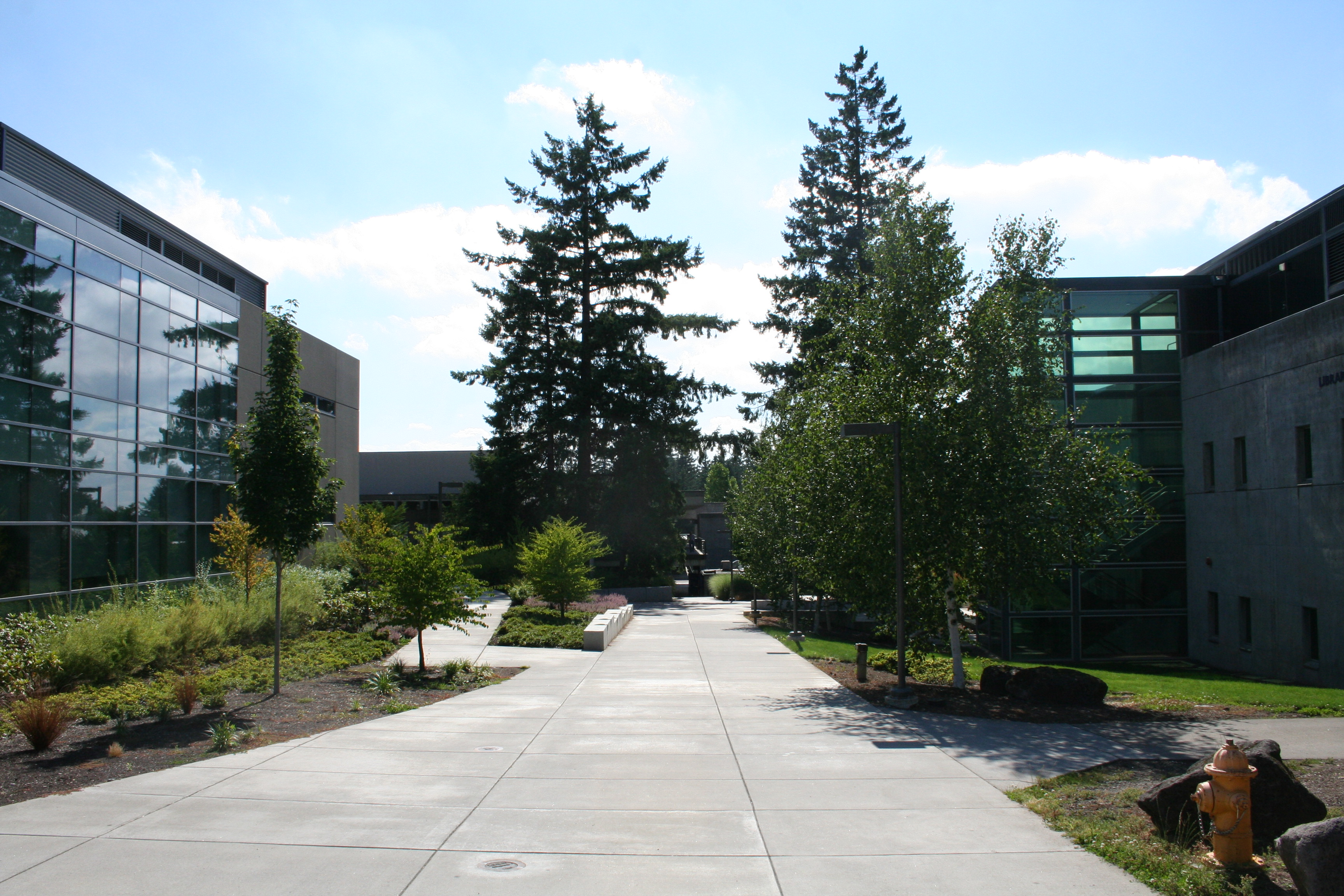
Sylvania campus

There are four main campuses, which are larger facilities offering two-year degrees and a range of typical student services:

- Sylvania, opened in the Far Southwest neighborhood of Portland in 1968 and serves over 26,000 students annually.
- Rock Creek, a 256-acre (104 ha) suburban campus, opened in 1976, near Hillsboro; it was also home to the Five Oaks Museum before its closure. It is about 12 miles west of downtown Portland.
- Cascade, an urban campus, opened in 1971, and is located in North Portland.
- Southeast, newly expanded and upgraded to a full-fledged campus in fall of 2014, originally in the former home of the local U.S. Corps of Engineers headquarters.

There are several centers throughout the Portland metropolitan area, which are smaller facilities offering more limited or specialized programs:

- Continuous Learning for Individuals, Management and Business (CLIMB) Center for Advancement (formerly the Central Portland Workforce Training Center), located near OMSI.
- Portland Metropolitan Workforce Training Center.
- Willow Creek Center, opened in 2009 in Hillsboro. It is located immediately adjacent to TriMet's Willow Creek Transit Center.
- Hillsboro Center, which serves about 500 students and moved to the Hillsboro Intermodal Transit Facility in 2010.
- Newberg Center, opened in fall 2011 and serving about 650 students.

In addition to classes held at campuses and centers, PCC partners with local business, schools, community centers, churches, and parks to offer classes in neighborhoods throughout the PCC district.

== Athletics ==
Portland Community College competes in the Northwest Athletic Conference (NWAC) as the Panthers, with its men's and women's basketball teams competing against those from the community colleges of Chemeketa, Clackamas, Mount Hood, Lane, Linn-Benton, Southwestern Oregon, and Umpqua.

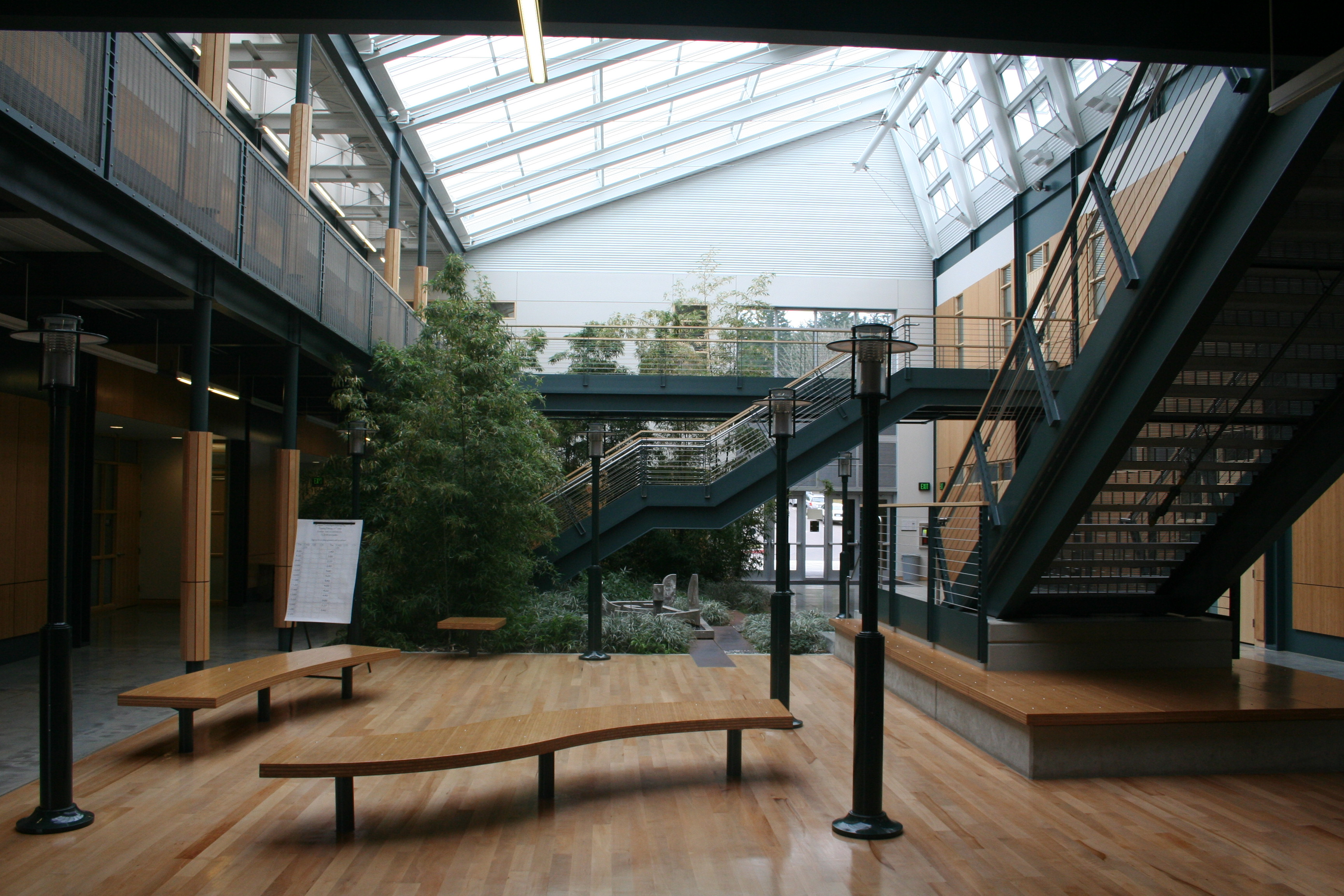
The Technology Classroom Building at PCC Sylvania

== Community education ==
Portland Community College offers hundreds of non-credit and continuing education unit (CEU) classes each term through its lifelong learning community education program, which enrolls more than 25,000 students each year online and in-person across Multnomah, Washington, Clackamas, Columbia, and Yamhill counties.

== Notable people ==
=== Alumni ===
- Margaret Carter, the first African-American woman elected to Oregon state's legislature
- Richard Curtis, politician from Washington state
- Karen Gaffney, the first person with Down syndrome to complete a relay swim of the English Channel
- Samantha Hess, owner and founder of the Certified Cuddlers Certification Program
- Jon Hill, former White House Executive Chef
- Matt Keeslar, actor
- Christopher Loeak, President of the Marshall Islands
- Nichole Mead, 2012 Miss Oregon
- Rebecca Skloot, author
- Marie Watt, contemporary artist
- Jackie Winters, Oregon politician
- Cameron Whitten, Occupy Portland organizer and community activist

=== Faculty ===
- Michael Dembrow
- Lew Frederick
- Ralph Friedman
- Larry Galizio
- Diana Schutz
- Ralf Youtz

== National Alternative Fuels Training Consortium ==
The college hosts a NAFTC Training Center.

== See also ==
- List of Oregon community colleges
