= John Lowe (sportswriter) =

American sportswriter

John Lowe is an American retired sportswriter.

In 1985, while writing for The Philadelphia Inquirer, Lowe invented the quality start statistic. He wrote that it "shows exactly how many times a baseball pitcher has done his job." The next year, he joined the Detroit Free Press to cover the Detroit Tigers. In December 2022, Lowe was named as the recipient of the BBWAA Career Excellence Award. In 2023 he was honored at the Baseball Hall of Fame.

Lowe graduated from the University of Southern California (USC) and worked for the Los Angeles Daily News early in his career. He served as president of the Baseball Writers' Association of America (BBWAA), and in 2012 was named Michigan sports writer of the year. He retired in 2014. Lowe is part of the Class of 2025 for the Michigan Sports Hall of Fame and enshrined on December 19, 2025 in Detroit.
