= Francis Wood =

Francis Wood may refer to:

- Sir Francis Wood, 2nd Baronet (1771–1846), British landowner
- Francis C. Wood (1869–1951), American cancer researcher
- Francis Derwent Wood (1871–1926), British sculptor
- Francis M. Wood (1878–1943), American educator and school administrator

== See also ==
- Frances Wood (disambiguation)
- Frank Wood (disambiguation)
- St. Francis Wood, San Francisco, a residential neighborhood in southwestern San Francisco, California
