= St. Mary's Academy (Portland, Oregon) =

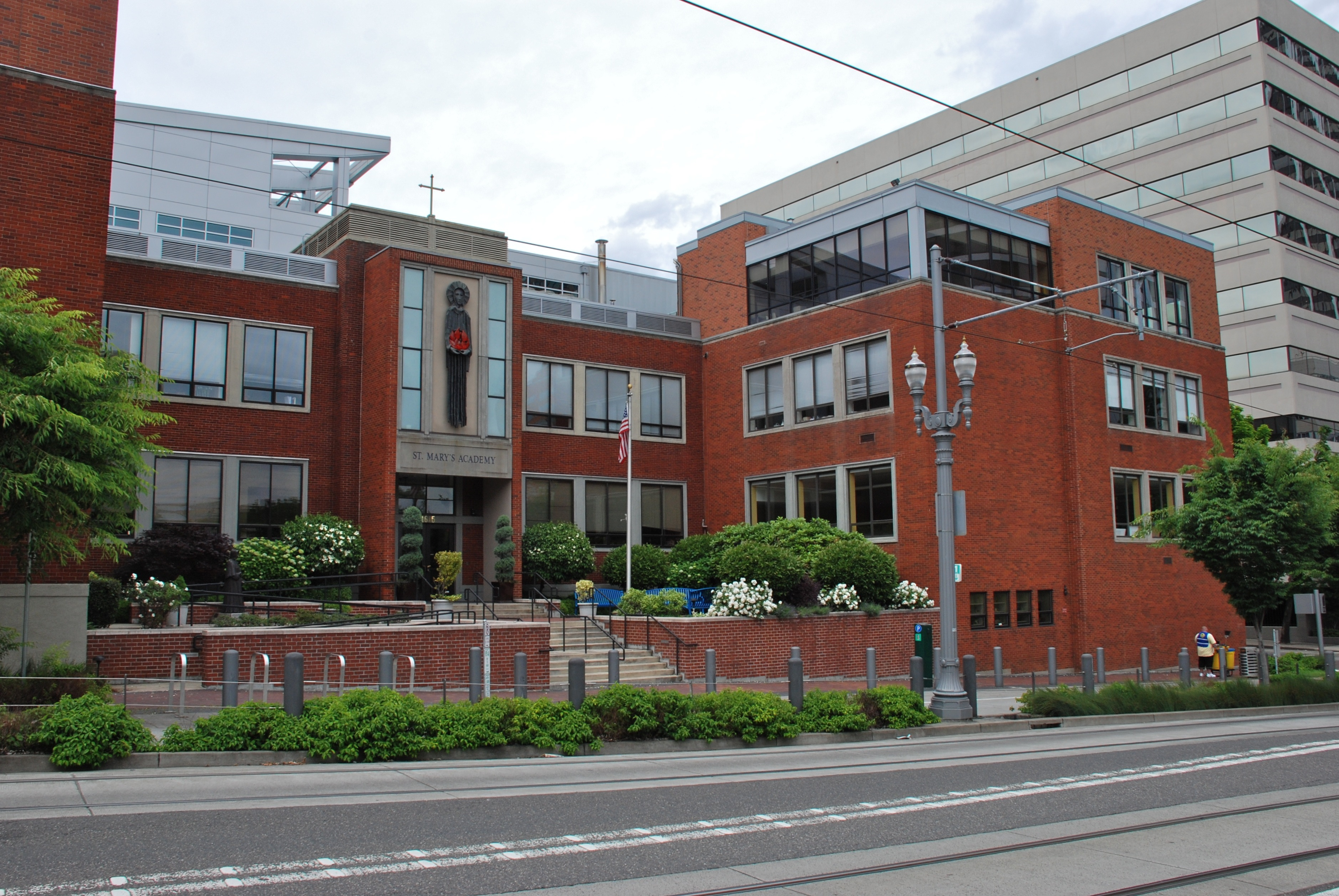

Location
- 1615 SW 5th Avenue; Portland, Multnomah County, Oregon 97201; United States; 45°30′45″N 122°40′53″W

Information
- Type: Private, All-Girls
- Motto: We Believe
- Religious affiliation: Roman Catholic
- Established: 1859
- President: Emily Becker
- Principal: Liane Rae
- Faculty: 57
- Grades: 9–12
- Enrollment: 555 (2025-2026)
- Average class size: 18
- Student to teacher ratio: 17:1
- Colors: Blue and white
- Athletics conference: OSAA Three Rivers League 6A-5
- Mascot: Blues
- Accreditation: Northwest Accreditation Commission
- Publication: Escribe Maria (literary magazine), Imprint (alumnae magazine)
- Website: stmaryspdx.org

St. Mary's Academy is a Roman Catholic all-girls high school located in Portland, Oregon, United States. It was founded by twelve sisters from the Sisters of the Holy Names of Jesus and Mary in 1859. It is an all-girls school with approximately 680 students from northern Oregon and southwestern Washington. Since its founding, over 10,000 women have graduated from St. Mary's Academy, the oldest continuously-operating secondary school in Oregon.

== History ==
St. Mary's was founded by twelve sisters from the Sisters of the Holy Names of Jesus and Mary in 1859, at the request of archbishop François Norbert Blanchet. Only two of the sisters spoke English; the others spoke French. They traveled from Montreal via ship and rail to Fort Vancouver where Blanchet had established a school on property he purchased from Daniel H. Lownsdale in 1857. The property had a two-story house, which became the school. St. Mary's opened in the same location with six female students (three Catholic, two Jewish, one Protestant) on Monday, November 7, 1859, 12 days after they reached Portland.

In 1867, the first two graduates received their diplomas. The school had 250 girls in attendance by 1871. In 1889, the Lownsdale house was demolished and a four-story building designed by Otto Kleeman was built. In 1893, St. Mary's received a charter to grant college diplomas. It was the first women's liberal arts college in the Northwest and was known until 1930 as St. Mary's Academy and College. Marylhurst University, originally part of the downtown school, moved out in 1930.

The Kleeman building was inadequate for the students by the 1960s. The school expanded across 5th avenue, one block to the north, building a two-story brick building that is "strictly functional.... [with] no architectural pretensions". The Kleeman building was sold to a developer for $705,000 and demolished in 1970. A public parking lot currently is on that site, although the original stone wall surrounding the building was demolished by the current owner in 2010. The school bought the old PSU postal office in 2013 for $7.6 million to allow the school to expand.

In August 2015, St. Mary's rescinded a job offer it made to Lauren Brown in April to work as a college guidance counselor. School officials said she had told them she intended to enter into a same-sex marriage, while Brown said she asked if doing so would affect her employment. The school quickly rescinded their employment offer, and offered Brown half a year's salary in exchange for not going forward to the media. When Brown rejected the offer and the school's action became public on August 26, Archbishop Alexander Sample supported the school's position. A statement was released by the school to parents and alumnae, stating that the hiring reversal was "due to a conflict with current Catholic teachings regarding same-sex marriage." The next day, the school announced that it was adding sexual orientation to its equal employment opportunity policy. It did not renew its employment offer to Brown, officials said, because another person had already accepted the position.

== Academics ==
In 1984, 1989, and 1998, St. Mary's Academy was honored in the Blue Ribbon Schools Program, the highest honor a school can receive in the United States. It also received the KATU Super School of the Year Award in 2006.

St. Mary's has been accredited through the Northwest Accreditation Commission since 1955.

The school was named an Apple Distinguished School in 2016, the only high school in Oregon to have received the honor.

== Notable alumnae ==
- Anna J. Brown, federal judge
- Mary E. Brunkow, Nobel Prize in Physiology or Medicine (2025)
- Jewel Carmen, actress
- Hilary Franz, Washington state Commissioner of Public Lands
- Karen Gaffney, swimmer and disability campaigner
- Patricia M. Haslach, former U.S. ambassador to Ethiopia
- Judi Meredith, actress
- Hoa Nguyen, member of the Oregon House of Representatives
- Mary F. Sammons, chairman and CEO of Rite Aid
- Da'Love Woods, professional basketball player
- Anna Maria Lopez, athletic director and NFHS Hall of Fame Inductee
- Catherine Candor, NYC vibe curator and creator
