= Linus Woods =

Canadian Aboriginal artist

Linus Woods (born June 3, 1967) is a Manitoba Aboriginal artist known for his spirit animals and Indigenous cultural themes which express his spiritual journey.

== Early life ==
Linus Woods was born in 1967 to Sioux and Ojibway parents and is a Dakota/Ojibway artist. He grew up in the Long Plain First Nation in Southern Manitoba. He is a self-taught artist, who took some art classes at Brandon University. He also studied informally with Jane Ash Poitras.

== Art ==
As an artist, he began travelling across North America in 1994 to gather Aboriginal native legend and folklore. At times "he lived with people who spoke only in their native language and practiced a traditional way of life." His paintings have often featured animals, especially those related to Aboriginal spirituality. His has also worked in the creation of public installations. Some of his most regarded work involve the encountering of UFOs during traditional Aboriginal settings. He has exhibited in both US and Canadian cities, and is represented by the Bearclaw Gallery in Alberta.

Woods's works are in the collections of the Canada Council Art Bank and Peace Hills Trust. In 2002 he also exhibited at the Inuit and Indian Art Gallery in Hull, Quebec, in 2003 he exhibited at the Image Makers First Nation Art Exhibit in Los Angeles, California, and in 2010 he exhibited his work at the Winnipeg Art Gallery.

He now resides in Edmonton, Alberta, where he has served as the Artist in Residence at Highlands Junior High School. He has been a recipient of grants from the Manitoba Arts Council and the Indian and Northern Affairs department of Canada.
