= Edward Woods (disambiguation) =

Edward Woods (1903–1989) was an American actor

Edward Woods may also refer to:

- Eddie Woods (born 1940), writer, editor and publisher
- Eddie Woods (footballer) (born 1951), Welsh footballer
- Edward Woods (bishop) (1877–1953), Bishop of Croydon, 1930–1937, and Bishop of Lichfield, 1937–1953, in the Church of England
- Edward Woods (engineer) (1814–1903), British civil engineer
- Richard Woods (diplomat) (born Edward Woods in 1941), government official in New Zealand
- Edward John Woods (1839–1916), known as E. J. Woods, South Australian architect

== See also ==
- Edward Wood (disambiguation)
