= Arthur Woods =

Arthur Woods may refer to:

- Arthur B. Woods (1904–1944), British film director
- Arthur H. Woods (1870–1942), American educator and law enforcement officer
- Arthur Woods (born 1948), American-Swiss artist, created the Cosmic Dancer sculpture flown aboard space station Mir 1993–2001
- Arthur Woods (rugby union) (1929–2015), New Zealand rugby union player
