= Harry Woods =

Harry Woods may refer to:

- Harry M. Woods (1896–1970), American musician and songwriter
- Harry Woods (actor) (1889–1968), American actor
- Harry Woods (footballer) (1890–1956), English footballer
- Harry Woods (Illinois politician) (1863–1914), American politician
- Harry Woods (Australian politician) (born 1947), Australian politician
- Harry Woods (rugby league) (1912–1989), English rugby league footballer
- Harry Woods (rugby union) (1903–1972), Australian rugby union player

== See also ==
- Harry Wood (disambiguation)
- Henry Woods (disambiguation)
