= Frank Woods (cricketer) =

New Zealand cricketer

Personal information
- Full name: Francis Woods
- Born: 28 January 1889; Christchurch, New Zealand
- Died: 5 January 1951 (aged 61); Christchurch, New Zealand
- Batting: Right-handed
- Bowling: Right-arm medium-pace
- Role: Occasional wicket-keeper

Domestic team information
- Years: Team
- 1913-14 to 1926-27: Canterbury

Career statistics
Competition	First-class
Matches	14
Runs scored	619
Batting average	25.79
100s/50s	1/2
Top score	124*
Balls bowled	16
Wickets	0
Bowling average	–
5 wickets in innings	–
10 wickets in match	–
Best bowling	–
Catches/stumpings	6/3
- Source: Cricinfo, 15 November 2019

Francis Woods (28 January 1889 – 5 January 1951) was a New Zealand cricketer who played first-class cricket for Canterbury between 1913 and 1927.

Frank Woods was a middle-order batsman who occasionally kept wicket. His best performance was against Auckland in 1925-26, when he scored 124 not out (the only century in the match) and 76. He was selected to keep wicket for South Island against North Island in 1921-22.
