= Henry Wood (minstrel) =

American minstrel

Henry Wood was a 19th-century New York City minstrel show manager, known for creating Wood's Minstrels. The group performed at Mechanics' Hall (New York City), among other locales.

Wood's brother Fernando Wood was a mayor of New York City and served in the United States House of Representatives. Another brother, Benjamin Wood, also served in Congress and the New York State Senate.
