= Thomas Woods (Irish diplomat) =

Irish writer and diplomat (1923–1961)

- Born: 1923
- Died: 17 April 1961 (aged 37–38)

Thomas Woods (1923 – 17 April 1961) was an Irish writer and diplomat.

Woods was born in Galway. He was a writer, and Ireland's Permanent Representative to the Council of Europe. He died in Strasbourg. He wrote a column for the books section of The Irish Times under the pseudonym "Thersites" and for other publications as "Thomas Hogan".

== Select bibliography ==
- Poetry and philosophy. A study in the thought of John Stuart Mill, London, 1961
- Intermediate Certificate French Poetry, editor, 1946 and 1948
- Leaving Certificate French Poetry, editor, 1946
