= Edward Wood (British Army officer) =

English cricketer and British Army officer

Major-General Edward Wood CB
- Wood as a major-general
- Born: Edward Alexander Wood; 8 May 1841; Kensington, Middlesex, England
- Died: 22 May 1898 (aged 57); Shorncliffe, Kent, England
- Military career
- Allegiance: United Kingdom
- Branch: British Army
- Service years: 1858–1898
- Rank: Major-General
- Commands: 10th Royal Hussars; Regimental District of Hounslow; Shorncliffe Army Camp
- Conflicts: Second Anglo-Afghan War; Mahdist War
- Awards: Egypt Medal; Khedive's Star
- Cricket career

Cricket information

Career statistics
Competition	First-class
Matches	1
Runs scored	8
Batting average	8.00
100s/50s	0/0
Top score	8
Catches/stumpings	1/–
- Source: CricInfo, 4 August 2025

Edward Alexander Wood CB (8 May 1841 — 22 May 1898) was a British Army officer and an English first-class cricketer. Wood was a career soldier in the 10th Royal Hussars, rising to the rank of major-general. He fought in both the Second Anglo-Afghan War and the Mahdist War, with Wood being made a Companion to the Order of the Bath for his service in the latter. He was also a first-class cricketer, appearing in one match in 1875.

== Early life ==
The son of Sir Charles Alexander Wood, deputy chairman of the Great Western Railway, he was born at Kensington in May 1841. He was educated at Radley College until 1852, after which he went to Eton College. After completing his education, Wood was commissioned into the 10th Royal Hussars as a cornet in July 1858, with him purchasing the rank of lieutenant in September 1859. Wood served in British Malta as aide-de-camp to the general commanding the troops from September 1862 to October 1863. From there he was posted to Ireland, where he served as aide-de-camp to the general commanding the troops from December 1863 to July 1864, after which he went to Dublin where he was aide-de-camp to the general commanding troops from December 1865 to January 1867. In July 1867, he purchased the rank of captain.

== Anglo-Afghan and Mahdist War's ==
Wood played first-class cricket in 1875, making a single appearance for the Gentlemen of Marylebone Cricket Club against the Gentlemen of Kent during Canterbury Cricket Week. Batting twice in the match from the tail, he was dismissed for 8 runs in the Gentlemen first innings by William Foord-Kelcey, while in their second innings he was unbeaten without scoring. He was appointed an adjutant at the Cavalry Depot at Canterbury in April 1875, a post he held until May 1876, when he relinquished the position upon his promotion to major without purchase in May 1876; from Canterbury he rejoined his regiment at Muttra in British India as second-in-command to Lord Ralph Kerr. When Kerr returned to England on leave, Wood assumed command of the regiment and in the winter of 1877 he marched it from Muttra to Rawalpindi. He took the regiment to war in the Second Anglo-Afghan War and commanded two squadrons at the Capture of Ali Masjid in November 1878. Wood remained in command of the 10th Hussars until Kerr's return in March 1879. For his services during the campaign, Wood was made a brevet lieutenant-colonel in November 1879.

Wood succeeded Kerr as commander of the regiment upon his retirement in May 1881, with Wood gaining the full rank of lieutenant-colonel in June. In February 1884, he embarked aboard the troopship HMS Jumna for the return journey to England following the end of the Hussars service in India. However, the ship was intercepted 20 miles outside Aden and given new orders to sail with haste for Suakin in the Khedivate of Egypt. The regiment disembarked and was supplied with horses from Baker Pasha's Cavalry and the Egyptian Gendarmerie, with the military objective of destroying the power of the Sudanese military commander Osman Digna. Wood commanded the command of the Cavalry Brigade until the arrival of Sir Herbert Stewart from England, commanding it at the Battles of El Teb and Tamai. He was mentioned in dispatches during the conflict and was made a Companion of the Order of the Bath in recognition of his service in it. He was promoted to colonel in November 1883.

== Later life and death ==
Upon his return to England in 1884, Wood was ordered to attend the movements of the Austro-Hungarian Army, for the purpose of reporting on their cavalry. He retired on half-pay in March 1886, at which point he was appointed Inspector of Auxiliary Cavalry and second-in-command of a brigade at Aldershot Garrison. Following the completion of four years in this command, Wood was promoted to major-general and was given command of the Regimental District of Hounslow. He was present at the funeral of Prince Albert Victor in January 1892. In January 1895, he was appointed to command the troops at Shorncliffe Army Camp. It was there that he died in May 1898, following a brief illness.
