= Elijah Woods =

Elijah Woods may refer to:

- Elijah Woods (politician) (1778–1820), Ohio politician
- Elijah Woods, half of Canadian electropop duo Elijah Woods x Jamie Fine

== See also ==
- Elijah Wood (born 1981), American actor
- Elijah Wood (murderer) (1878–1913), American murderer
