= Edward Wood (priest) =

Former Archdeacon of Mashonaland

Edward David Kent Wood was Archdeacon of Mashonaland from 1946 to 1960.

Upcher was educated at the London College of Divinity and ordained deacon in 1930 and priest in 1931. After a curacy in Thornton Heath he went out to Zimbabwe (then called Rhodesia) as a missionary. He held incumbencies at Gwelo and Umtali before his years as Archdeacon; and at Lavant, West Sussex.
