= Andrew Woods =

Andrew Woods may refer to:

- Andrew W. Woods (born 1964), professor at the University of Cambridge
- Andrew Woods (archaeologist) (fl. 2000s–2020s), British numismatist and archaeologist
- Andrew Salter Woods (1803–1863), justice of the New Hampshire Supreme Court
- Andrew Woods from The Real World: D.C.

== See also ==
- Andrew Wood (disambiguation)
