= Julian Woods =

Julian Woods may refer to:

- Julian Tenison-Woods (1832–1889), English Catholic priest and geologist
- Julian Woods (cricketer) (1887–1975), Australian cricketer
