= Henry Woods =

Henry Woods may refer to:

- Henry Woods (Pennsylvania politician) (1764–1826), American congressman
- Henry Felix Woods (1843–1929), British admiral
- Henry Woods (boxer) (1914–1990), American boxer
- Henry Woods (geologist) (1868–1952), British geologist
- Henry Woods (painter) (1846–1921), English painter
- Henry Woods (judge) (1918–2002), American judge
- Henry Woods (MP) (1822–1882), English cotton manufacturer, colliery owner and Liberal MP
- Henry George Woods (1842–1915), Anglican clergyman and academic
- Henry J. B. Woods (1842–1914), merchant and political figure in Newfoundland
- Henry Woods (British Army officer) (1924–2019), British general
- Henry Woods (footballer) (born 1999), Gillingham footballer

== See also ==
- Harry Woods (disambiguation)
- Henry Wood (disambiguation)
