= Charles Woods (cricketer, born 1878) =

English cricketer

Personal information
- Full name: Charles Pound Woods
- Born: 12 September 1878; Swinton, Lancashire, England
- Died: 1 July 1940 (aged 61); Llandudno, Caernarvonshire, Wales
- Batting: Right-handed

Domestic team information
- Years: Team
- 1930: Wales
- 1910–1912: Cheshire

Career statistics
Competition	First-class
Matches	1
Runs scored	9
Batting average	4.50
100s/50s	–/–
Top score	5
Balls bowled	–
Wickets	–
Bowling average	–
5 wickets in innings	–
10 wickets in match	–
Best bowling	–
Catches/stumpings	–/–
- Source: Cricinfo, 30 August 2011

Charles Pound Woods (12 September 1878 – 1 July 1940) was an English cricketer. Woods was a right-handed batsman. He was born in Swinton, Lancashire.

Woods made his debut for Cheshire in the 1910 Minor Counties Championship against Northumberland. He played Minor counties cricket for the county from 1910 to 1912, making six appearances. Almost twenty years later at the age of 51, he played a single first-class match for Wales against the Minor Counties in 1930. In Wales first-innings he was dismissed for 5 runs by Ernest Dynes, while in their second-innings he was dismissed for 4 runs by the same bowler.

He died in Llandudno, Caernarvonshire, Wales on 1 July 1940.
