= Samuel Woods =

Samuel or Sam Woods may refer to:

- Sam Woods (politician) (1846–1915), British trade unionist
- Samuel D. Woods (1845–1915), U.S. Representative from California
- Samuel V. Woods (1856–?), member of the West Virginia Senate
- Sammy Woods (1867–1931), Australian cricketer
- Samuel Kofi Woods (born 1964), Liberian activist
- Samuel Woods (footballer) (1871–?), Scottish footballer
- Sam Woods (baseball) (1920–1983), American Negro leagues baseball player
- Sam Woods (civil servant), British civil servant
- Samuel Woods (priest), priest in New Zealand
- Sam Woods (footballer) (born 1998), English footballer for Plymouth Argyle F.C.
- Samuel Woods (Medal of Honor) (1838–1893), American Union Navy sailor and Medal of Honor recipient

== See also ==
- Samuel Wood (disambiguation)
