= Frank Wood =

Frank Wood may refer to:

- Frank W. Wood (1862–1953), Royal Navy officer and watercolorist
- Frank Porter Wood (1882–1955), Canadian art collector
- Frank C. Wood (1872–1912), American lawyer and politician from New York
- Frank E. Wood (1891–1972), American football coach and mathematics professor
- Frank Bradshaw Wood (1915–1997), American astronomer,
- Frank Wood (footballer) (1924-?), English footballer for Bury and Exeter City, see List of Bury F.C. players (1–24 appearances)
- Frank Wood (Iowa politician) (born 1951), Iowa state senator
- Frank Wood (actor) (born 1960), American actor

== See also ==
- Francis Wood (disambiguation)
- Frank Woods (disambiguation)
- Frank Woodley (born 1968), Australian comedian
