= Pat Woods =

Pat Woods may refer to:

- Pat Woods (politician) (born 1948/49), American politician in the New Mexico Senate
- Pat Woods (footballer) (1933–2012), English footballer

== See also ==
- Pat Wood (disambiguation)
