= Josie Alma Woods =

American politician (1889–1983)

Member of the Nevada Assembly
- In office 1943 – 1947

Personal details
- Born: December 29, 1889 Clyde, Texas
- Died: February 19, 1983 (aged 93) Eden, Texas
- Party: Nevada Republican Party
- Occupation: Politician

Josie Alma Woods (December 29, 1889 – February 19, 1983) was an American politician who served as a member of the Nevada Assembly from 1943 to 1947, representing Eureka County.

== Biography ==
Woods was born on December 29, 1889, in Clyde, Texas. She attended dental college in San Francisco. From 1907 to 1918, Woods and another dentist, Mabel Young, traveled between mining towns, until Young's health became too poor to continue. Woods purchased a 320-acre homestead near Eureka, Nevada, in 1919. By the time she sold the ranch in 1954, it encompassed 1,200 square miles.

She was elected to the Nevada Assembly in 1942, serving two terms. Woods died on February 19, 1983, in Eden, Texas.

Woods was honored by the Nevada Legislature in 1997. The resolution stated that she "embodied the true spirit of the pioneer woman". She was also the inspiration for the 1967 film The Ballad of Josie.
