= Thomas Wood =

Thomas Wood may refer to:

== Politicians ==
- Thomas Wood (judge) (died 1502), English judge and politician, MP for Wallingford
- Thomas Wood (1708–1799), British MP for Middlesex
- Thomas Wood (1777–1860), British MP for Breconshire
- Thomas Wood (British Army officer) (1804–1872), British MP for Middlesex
- Thomas Wood (Quebec politician) (1815–1898), Canadian politician
- Thomas Wood (mayor) (1792–1861), mayor of Columbus, Ohio
- Thomas Wood (soldier) (1853–1933), British soldier and Conservative MP for Breconshire 1892–1900
- Thomas Harold Wood (1889–1965), Canadian politician
- Thomas Jefferson Wood (1844–1908), U.S. representative from Indiana
- Thomas McKinnon Wood (1855–1927), British Liberal politician

== Religious figures ==
- Thomas Wood (bishop of Lichfield and Coventry) (1607–1692), Anglican diocesan bishop
- Thomas Wood (bishop of Bedford) (1885–1961), Anglican suffragan bishop
- Thomas Wood (priest), Roman Catholic chaplain to Queen Mary of England
- Thomas Wood (reverend) (1711–1778), minister in Halifax, Nova Scotia, Canada

== Sportspeople ==
- Thomas Wood (Somerset cricketer) (1861–1933), English cricketer
- Tom Wood (Derbyshire cricketer) (born 1994), English cricketer
- Leslie Wood (footballer) (Thomas Leslie Wooborn, 1932–2005), English footballer

== Artists ==
- Thomas Peploe Wood (1817–1845), English artist
- Thomas Waterman Wood (1823–1903), American painter
- Thomas Wood (sculptor) (1646–1695), British sculptor

== Others ==
- Thomas Wood (composer) (1892–1950), English composer and author
- E. Thomas Wood (born 1963), American journalist and author
- Thomas J. Wood (1823–1906), Union General during the American Civil War
- Thomas Barlow Wood (1869–1929), British professor of agriculture, founder of The Journal of Agricultural Science
- Tom Wood (actor) (Thomas Mills Wood, born 1963), American film and television character actor

== See also ==
- Tom Wood (disambiguation)
- Thomas Woods (disambiguation)
- Thomas Atwode or Wode, English politician
