= Jack Woods =

Jack Woods may refer to:

- Jack Woods (footballer) (1896 – ?), English professional footballer
- Jack Woods (priest), Scottish priest
