= Da'Love Woods =

American basketball player

- Woods in uniform for BBV Leipzig

Personal information
- Born: September 7, 1982 (age 44) Portland, Oregon
- Listed height: 5 ft 5 in (1.65 m)
- Listed weight: 135 lb (61 kg)

Career information
- High school: St. Mary's Academy (Portland, Oregon)
- College: Portland; Colorado State
- Playing career: 2007–2009
- Position: Point guard

Career history
- 2007: Esperance Sportive Pully
- 2008: BBV Leipzig
- 2008: Cukierki ODRA Brzeg

Career highlights
- DBBL Guard of the Year (2008); DBBL 1st Team (2008); DBBL All-Imports Team (2008); First Team All-WCC (2002)

Da'Love Woods (born September 7, 1982) is an American professional basketball player, in Europe. At 1.65 m (5 ft 5 in) in height, she plays at the point guard position.

== College career ==
Born in Portland, Oregon, Woods played college basketball at the University of Portland and Colorado State University. In 2001, as a freshman at the University of Portland, she broke the then West Coast Conference Tournament scoring record with 31 points. As a sophomore, Woods went on to become a 1st-Team all West Coast Conference player in 2002.

== Professional playing career ==
Woods began her European playing career in Switzerland for LNA club Esperance Sportive Pully in 2007. There she averaged 34.8 points per game. In 2004 and 2005 Woods was invited to the training camp of the Colorado Chill of the National Women's Basketball League.

Woods most recently played in Germany's DBBL for BBV Leipzig during the 2007-2008 season. She earned several EuroBasket awards while playing for BBV Leipzig, which included DBBL Guard of the Year. Woods was also awarded 1st Team-DBBL and was a member of the DBBL All-Imports Team. Woods finished the DBBL season as the league leader in points and assist, averaging 20.2 points per game and 6 assist per game.

== Professional career ==
Woods is the owner of Deep Three Basketball which holds summer league basketball tournaments in her hometown of Portland, Oregon. Woods also acts as the league director of the Portland Women's Summer League (PWSL), a venture of the Deep Three Basketball company.

== Career statistics ==
Legend
GP	Games played	GS	Games started	MPG	Minutes per game	RPG	Rebounds per game
APG	Assists per game	SPG	Steals per game	BPG	Blocks per game	PPG	Points per game
TO	Turnovers per game	FG%	Field-goal percentage	3P%	3-point field-goal percentage	FT%	Free-throw percentage
**Bold**	Career best	°	League leader

=== College ===
Year	Team	GP	GS	MPG	FG%	3P%	FT%	RPG	APG	SPG	BPG	TO	PPG
2000–01	Portland	**29**	-	-	**44.8**	0.0	57.7	**3.9**	3.8	1.6	0.0	-	9.7
2001–02	Portland	28	-	-	40.9	**29.9**	**65.6**	3.6	**4.4**	**2.0**	0.0	-	**14.5**
**Career**		57	-	-	42.5	27.4	61.9	3.8	4.1	1.8	0.0	-	12.0
Statistics retrieved from Sports-Reference.
