= Alice Woods =

Alice Woods may refer to:

- Alice Woods (educationist) (1849–1941), British educationist and college head
- Alice Woods (footballer) (1899–1991), English footballer

== See also ==
- Alice Woods Ullman (1871–1959), American painter, illustrator, and writer
- Alice Wood (disambiguation)
