= Paul Woods =

Paul Woods may refer to:

- Paul Woods (ice hockey)
- Paul Woods (rugby)
- Paul Woods (speedway rider)

== See also ==
- Paul Wood (disambiguation)
