= Harry Harvey Wood =

Scottish writer

Henry Harvey Wood FRSE OBE
- Born: 5 September 1903; Edinburgh, Scotland
- Died: 12 August 1977 (aged 73); London, England
- Education: Edinburgh College of Art; Edinburgh University
- Occupation: Educator
- Known for: Founding the Edinburgh International Festival
- Spouse: Lily Terry (m. 1932)
- Children: 3

Henry Harvey Wood FRSE OBE (5 September 1903 – 12 August 1977) was a Scottish literary and artistic figure best known as a founder of the Edinburgh International Festival.

== Life ==
He was born in Edinburgh on 5 September 1903 the second of three children to Henry Wood (d.1934) a paper-maker, and his wife, Anne Cassidy. He was educated at the Royal High School, Edinburgh on Calton Hill then studied at the Edinburgh College of Art. He then moved to Edinburgh University to study English Literature under a Vans Dunlop Scholarship. He graduated MA in 1931.

He began lecturing in English Literature and Rhetoric at Edinburgh immediately after graduating. He spoke with a lisp.

In the Second World War he was declared unfit for active service, but worked briefly in Intelligence. Wood established a branch of the British Council in Edinburgh in 1940. He enlisted the help of artistic and literary friends such as the poet Edwin Muir.

In 1943 he was elected a Fellow of the Royal Society of Edinburgh. His proposers were Stanley Cursiter, James Cameron Smail, Thomas Elder Dickson and James Pickering Kendall.

He also published critical editions of works by Robert Henryson and John Marston as well as a book on Scottish literature. He persuaded Rudolf Bing to meet with the Lord Provost of Edinburgh Sir John Falconer which led to the staging of the Festival in 1947. He served as the first chairman of the program committee and on the Executive Council.

He left Edinburgh in 1950 when asked to run the British Council in France. He worked briefly in London before again working for the Council in Italy from 1960 to 1965. He returned to Edinburgh University in 1965.

He died of cancer at his home, 158 Coleherne Court in London on 12 August 1977. He was cremated at Golders Green Crematorium on 17 August.

== Publications ==
- The Poems and Fables of Robert Henryson (1933)
- The Plays of John Marston (1934)
- The Cherrie and the Slae (1937)
- Scottish Literature (1952)
- Two Scots Chaucerians (1967)
- William MacTaggart (1974)

== Family ==
In 1932 he married Lily Terry (1907–2005). They had a son and two daughters.

== Artistic recognition ==
His portrait by Sir William Gillies is held by the Scottish National Portrait Gallery but is rarely displayed.
