= Tom Woods (disambiguation) =

Tom Woods (born 1972) is an American historian and author.

Thomas, Tom or Tommy Woods may also refer to:

== Sports ==
- Tom Woods (high jumper) (born 1953), American high jumper
- Tom Woods (American football) (1896–1978), American football player
- Tom Woods (rugby union), Canadian rugby player
- Tommy Woods (baseball), Negro leagues baseball player
- Tommy Woods (basketball) (born 1943), American professional basketball player
- Tommy Woods (rugby) (1883–1955), English rugby union and rugby league footballer who played in the 1900s and 1910s for England (RU), Great Britain (RL), and England (RL)
- Thomas Woods (rugby) (1890–?), rugby union and rugby league footballer who played in the 1920s for England (RU), and Wales (RL)
- Thomas Syme (Thomas Woods Syme, 1928–2011), British ice hockey player

== Politics ==
- Tom Woods (California politician) (born 1947), member of the California State Assembly 1994–1998
- Tom Woods (Montana politician) (born 1961), member of the Montana House of Representatives
- Tom Woods (Oklahoma politician), member of the Oklahoma Senate
- Tommy Woods (politician) (1933–2020), American politician in the Mississippi House of Representatives
- Thomas H. Woods (1836–1910), American politician and judge in Mississippi
- Thomas Woods (Irish diplomat) (1923–1961), Irish writer and politician

== See also ==
- Thomas Wood (disambiguation)
