= List of people with surname Wood =

Wood is a common anglophone surname. Notable people with the surname Wood include:

== A ==
- Adam Wood (born 1955), British diplomat
- Adrian H. Wood, American educator and writer
- Aimee Lou Wood (born 1994), English actress
- Alan Wood (disambiguation), multiple people
  - Alan Muir Wood (1921–2009), British civil engineer
  - Alan Thorpe Richard Wood (born 1954), British public servant
  - Alan Wood Jr. (1834–1902), U.S. Representative from Pennsylvania
  - Alan Wood (Australian politician) (1927–2005), Victorian state politician
  - Alan Wood (engineer) (born 1947), British engineer and executive
  - Alan Wood (footballer, born 1941) (1941–2008), Welsh footballer
  - Alan Wood (footballer, born 1954), English football player
  - Alan Wood (military officer) (1922–2013), American naval officer
- Albert Beaumont Wood (1890–1964), British physicist
- Alex Wood (disambiguation), multiple people
  - Alex Wood (American football) (born 1955), college football coach
  - Alex Wood (baseball) (born 1991), American baseball pitcher
  - Alex Wood (bishop) (1871–1937), Anglican bishop in India
  - Alex Wood (ice hockey) (1909–1979), ice hockey goaltender
  - Alex Wood (politician) (born 1950), former Labour leader of Edinburgh City Council in Scotland
- Alexander Wood (disambiguation), multiple people
  - Alexander Wood, Lord Wood (1788–1864), Scottish judge
  - Alexander Wood (footballer) (1906–?), Scottish footballer
  - Alexander Wood (physician) (1817–1884), physician and inventor of the hypodermic needle
  - Alexander Wood (physicist) (1879–1950), university lecturer in the field of acoustics and experimental physics
  - Alexander Wood (merchant) (1772–1844), city magistrate forced to leave Upper Canada in 1810 following allegations of scandal
  - Alexander Wood (rugby union) (1848–1905), Scottish rugby union player
  - Alexander Wood (soccer) (1907–1987), member of the American Soccer Hall of Fame
  - Alexander Wood (surgeon) (1725–1807), Edinburgh surgeon
- Algernon R. Wood (died 1869), American politician from Virginia
- Alice Robinson Boise Wood (1846–1919), American classiest classicist and poet
- Allan Singleton-Wood (born 1933), British musician and publisher who performed under the stage name Allan Wood
- Allan Wood (1943–2022), Australian swimmer
- Allen W. Wood (born 1942), American philosopher
- Alson Wood (1828–1904), American politician
- Andrew Wood (disambiguation), multiple people
  - Andrew Trew Wood (1826–1903), Canadian businessman and parliamentarian
  - Andrew Wood of Largo (died 1515), Scottish admiral
  - Andrew Wood (bishop) (died 1695), Scottish prelate
  - Andy Wood (comedian) (born 1977), American comedian and producer
  - Andrew Wood (diplomat) (born 1940), British diplomat
  - Andy Wood (historian) (born 1967), British social historian
  - Andrew Wood (singer) (1966–1990), lead singer of Mother Love Bone and Malfunkshun
  - Andrew Wood (surgeon) (1810–1881), Scottish surgeon
- Anne Wood (born 1937), English children's television producer, co-creator of Teletubbies
- Anne Brancato Wood (1903–1972), American politician
- Anson S. Wood (1834–1904), American lawyer and politician
- Anthony Wood (disambiguation), several people
  - Anthony Wood (antiquary) (1632–1695), English antiquary
  - Anthony Wood (artist) (1925–2022), British heraldic artist
  - Anthony Wood (businessman) (born 1965/66), British-born American billionaire businessman
  - Anthony Wood (historian) (1923–1987), British school teacher and historian
- Ardeth Wood, Murder of Ardeth Wood (1975–2003), graduate student at the University of Waterloo
- Arthur Wood (disambiguation), several people
- Arthur Henry Wood (1875–1953), English composer and conductor

== B ==
- Barbara Wood (born 1947), American writer
- Barbara Wood (cricketer) (1917–1998), English cricketer
- Barbara Wood (politician), American politician
- Barnabas Wood (1819–1875), American dentist and namesake of Wood's metal
- Barry Wood (disambiguation), multiple people
  - Barry Wood (bishop) (1942–2017), South African Roman Catholic bishop
  - Barry Wood (cricketer) (born 1942), English former cricketer
  - Barry Wood (singer) (1909–1970), American singer and television producer
  - Barry Wood (American football) (1910–1971), American football player and medical educator
  - Barry Wood (interior designer), model, American television host, and interior decorator
  - Barry Wood (rugby league) (born 1950), Australian rugby league footballer
- Basil Wood, (1900–1977), English footballer
- Beatrice Wood (1893–1998), American artist
- Benjamin Wood (disambiguation), multiple people
  - Benjamin D. Wood (1894–1986), American educator, researcher, and director
  - Benjamin T. Wood, American architect
  - Benjamin Wood (American politician) (1820–1900), U.S. Representative from New York and publishing entrepreneur
  - Benjamin Wood (MP) (1787–1845), British Whig politician
  - Benjamin Wood (cricketer) (born 1971), English cricketer
  - Ben Wood (born 1980), British visual artist
- Bernard Wood (disambiguation), multiple people
  - Bernard Wood (cricketer) (1886–1974), New Zealand cricketer, golfer and businessman
  - Bernard Wood (geologist), British geologist
  - Bernie Wood (1939–2013), New Zealand rugby league administrator and sports historian
- Beth Wood (born 1954), North Carolina public official and accountant
- Bill Wood (disambiguation), multiple people
  - Bill Wood (American football) (1894–1966), American football player and coach
  - Bill Wood (Australian footballer) (1921–1989), Australian rules footballer
  - Bill Wood (footballer, born 1927) (1927–2010), English footballer
  - Bill Wood (politician) (1935–2024), Australian politician
  - Bill Wood (baseball) (born 1941), baseball scout
- Brandon Wood (born 1985), American baseball player
- Brandon Wood (basketball) (born 1989), American basketball player
- Brenton Wood (1941–2025), American singer and songwriter

== C ==
- Carl Wood (1929–2011), in vitro fertilization pioneer at Monash University
- Carroll D. Wood (1858–1941), associate justice of the Arkansas Supreme Court
- Casey Albert Wood (1856–1942), American ophthalmologist and zoologist
- Cathy Wood, of Gwendolyn Graham and Cathy Wood, American serial killers
- Charles Wood (disambiguation), multiple people
  - Charles Carroll Wood (1876–1899), Canadian military officer
  - Charles Chatworthy Wood Taylor (1792–1856), English artist and engineer, designer of the coat of arms of Chile
  - Charles Erskine Scott Wood, American author, activist, and attorney
  - Charles H. Wood (c. 1837–1917), British chemist
  - Charles Osgood Wood III Charles Osgood (1933–2024), radio and television commentator, writer, and musician
  - Charles Thorold Wood (1777–1852), English ornithologist
  - Charles Winter Wood (1869–1953), football coach for Tuskegee University Golden Tigers
  - Charles Wood, 1st Viscount Halifax (1800–1885), English politician
  - Charles Wood, 2nd Viscount Halifax (1839–1934), English politician
  - Charles Wood, 2nd Earl of Halifax (1912–1980), British politician and peer
  - Charles Wood (actor) (1916–1978), American singer and actor in Broadway musicals
  - Charles Wood (businessman) (1914–2004), American businessman
  - Charles Wood (composer) (1866–1926), Irish composer and teacher
  - Charles Wood (footballer, born 1851), FA Cup winner for the Royal Engineers A.F.C.
  - Charlie Wood (footballer) (born 2002), English footballer
  - Charles Wood (ironmaster) (1702–1774), British chemist
  - Charles Wood (jockey) (1855–1945), British jockey
  - Charlie Wood (musician), American singer, songwriter and keyboardist
  - Charles Wood (playwright) (1932–2020), British playwright and screenwrite
  - Charles Wood (singer and actor) (1916–1978), on Broadway
  - Charlie Wood, cofounder of the Northern Cree singers
- Chris Wood (disambiguation), multiple people
  - Chris Wood (actor) (born 1988), American actor
  - Chris Wood (cricketer) (born 1990), English Cricketer
  - Chris Wood (CIA), Counterterrorism officer of the CIA who hunted Osama Bin Laden
  - Chris Wood (diplomat) (born 1959), British diplomat
  - Chris Wood (folk musician), English folk singer and musician
  - Chris Wood (footballer, born 1955), English footballer who played for Huddersfield Town
  - Chris Wood (footballer, born 1987), English footballer who formerly played for Mansfield town, now Worksop Town
  - Chris Wood (footballer, born 1991), Nottingham Forest and New Zealand international footballer
  - Chris Wood (golfer) (born 1987), British golfer
  - Chris Wood (jazz musician) (born 1969), bassist with the trio Medeski Martin & Wood
  - Chris Wood (rock musician) (1944–1983), saxophonist, flautist with the rock band Traffic
- Christopher Wood (disambiguation), multiple people
  - Christopher Wood (art historian) (born 1961), professor at New York University
  - Christopher Wood (biologist), professor of biology at McMaster University
  - Christopher Wood (composer), Welsh composer
  - Christopher Wood (cricketer, born 1934) (1934–2006), English cricketer
  - Christopher Wood (financial analyst), managing director of the broking firm CLSA
  - Christopher Wood (painter) "Kit Wood" (1901–1930), English painter
  - Christopher Wood (socialite) (1900–1976), partner of Gerald Heard
  - Christopher Wood (writer) (1935–2015), English screenwriter and novelist
  - Christopher Wood, who killed his wife, children, and himself in 2009, followed by that of William Parente
  - Christopher Wood, American R&B singer better known by his stage name Brent Faiyaz
- Clare Wood (born 1968), British pro tennis player
- Connor Wood (basketball) (born 1993), Canadian basketball player
- Corinne Wood (1954–2021), American politician, first female lieutenant governor of Illinois
- Craig Wood (disambiguation), several people
  - Craig Wood (film editor), film editor
  - Craig Wood (golfer) (1901–1968), professional golfer
  - Craig Wood (guitarist) (born 1978), guitarist for Avril Lavigne
- Cynthia Wood, (born 1950), American model and actress

== D ==
- Daniel P. Wood (1819–1891), N.Y. senator and general
- Darren Wood (born 1964), English football player
- DaShaun Wood (born 1985), American basketball player
- David Wood (disambiguation), multiple people
  - David Duffield Wood (1838–1910), American composer, educator, and musician
  - David Leonard Wood (born 1957), American serial killer
  - David Muir Wood (born 1949), author
  - David Wood (actor) (born 1944), English actor and playwright
  - David Wood (basketball) (born 1964), American professional basketball player
  - David Wood (British Army officer) (1923–2009), British Army officer
  - David Wood (cricketer) (born 1965), English cricketer
  - David Wood (Christian apologist) (born 1976), American YouTuber and evangelical apologist
  - David Wood (environmental campaigner) (1963–2006), Executive Director of the GrassRoots Recycling Network
  - David Wood (journalist), American journalist
  - David Wood (judge) (born 1948), British judge
  - David Wood (mathematician) (born 1971), Australian mathematician
  - David Wood (New Zealand musician), musician with Straitjacket Fits
  - David Wood (philosopher) (born 1946), professor of philosophy at Vanderbilt University
  - David Wood (politician) (born 1961), member of the Missouri House of Representatives
- Denis Wood, author and professor of Design at North Carolina State University
- Dennis Wood (1934–2001), Welsh geologist
- Doc Wood (1900–1974), American baseball player
- Dominic Wood (born 1978), British actor
- Donald Wood (1933–2015), Canadian politician, businessman and farmer
- Donald Wood-Smith (1931–?), Australian-born Professor of Clinical Surgery
- Doug Wood (athlete) (born 1966), Canadian pole vaulter
- Dougie Wood (1940–2022), Scottish athlete and football coach
- Douglas Wood (disambiguation), several people
  - Douglas Wood (actor) (1880–1966), American actor of stage and screen
  - Douglas Wood (engineer) (1941–2019), engineer taken hostage in Iraq in 2005
  - Douglas Wood (naturalist) (f. 1990–2000s), US author and musician.
  - Doug Wood (pole vaulter) (born 1966), Canadian athlete in pole-vault
  - Douglas Wood (writer), US actor, writer, producer of television shows and animated movies
  - Dougie Wood (1940–2022), Scottish athlete and coach in football

== E ==
- Easton Wood (born 1989), Australian footballer
- Edmund Burke Wood (1820–1882), Canadian politician and judge
- Ed Wood Edward D. Wood, Jr. (1924–1978), American film director
- Elijah Wood (born 1981), American actor
- Elisabeth Jean Wood, American political scientist
- Elizabeth Wood (disambiguation), multiple people
  - Elizabeth Boleyn, Lady Boleyn (fl. 1530s), née Elizabeth Wood, witness against her niece, Anne Boleyn
  - Elizabeth Wood (director), American film director
  - Elizabeth Wood (executive) (1899–1993), executive director, Chicago Housing Authority
  - Elizabeth A. Wood (1912–2006), American crystallographer
  - Elizabeth Wyn Wood (1903–1966), Canadian sculptor
- Ellen Wood (author) (1814–1887), wrote under the name Mrs Henry Wood, English novelist
- Enoch Wood (1759–1840), English potter
- Eric Wood, (born 1986), American football player
- Esther E. Wood (1905–2002), American journalist
- Evan Rachel Wood (born 1987), American actress
- Evelyn Wood (British Army officer) British Army officer, Colonial wars 1855–1905
- Evelyn Wood (teacher) American educator known for speed reading

== F ==
- Fernando Wood (1812–1881), mayor of New York City
- Francis C. Wood (1869–1951), American cancer researcher with Crocker Institute
- Francis Marion Wood (1878–1943), American educator and school administrator
- Frank Wood (disambiguation), several people
  - Frank Bradshaw Wood (1915–1997), American astronomer
  - Frank C. Wood (1872–1912), American lawyer and politician from New York
  - Frank E. Wood (1891–1972), American football coach and mathematics professor
  - Frank Porter Wood (1882–1955), Canadian art collector
  - Frank W. Wood (1862–1953), Royal Navy officer and watercolorist
  - Frank Wood (actor) (born 1960), American actor
  - Frank Wood (Iowa politician) (born 1951)
- Freeman Wood (1896–1956), American actor

== G ==
- G. Wood (1919–2000), American actor
- Gaby Wood (born 1971), English journalist and literary critic
- Garfield Wood, (1880–1971) American inventor, entrepreneur, motorboat builder and racer
- Garth Wood (born 1978), Australian boxer and rugby league footballer
- George Wood (disambiguation), multiple people
  - Pseudonym of Fritz Kolbe (1900–1971), German spy for the US during World War II
  - George Wood, founder of Wawa Food Markets
  - George Wood (actor) (born 1981), English actor, singer, and composer
  - George Wood (baseball) (1858–1924), Canadian baseball player and manager
  - George Wood (British Army officer) (1898–1982), during World War II
  - George Wood (Canadian politician) (1888–1966), member of Parliament, Brant, Ontario
  - George Wood (cricketer, born 1893) (1893–1971), English cricketer
  - George Wood (died 1558), MP for Flintshire
  - George Wood (footballer) (born 1952), Scottish footballer
  - George Wood (gymnast) (born 1999), British acrobatic gymnast
  - George Wood (judge) (1743–1824), English lawyer and politician
  - George Wood (New Zealand politician) (born 1946), New Zealand politician
  - George Wood (Radio Sweden) (born 1949), American journalist
  - George Wood (New Zealand politician) (born 1946), former mayor of North Shore City, Auckland, New Zealand
  - George Wood (Somerset cricketer) (1865–1948), first-class cricketer who played three matches in 1893 and 1894
  - George Wood (Yorkshire cricketer) (1862–1948), first-class cricketer who played two matches for Yorkshire
  - George Adam Wood (1767–1831), British Army officer of the Napoleonic Era
  - George Arnold Wood (1865–1928), Australian historian
  - George Bacon Wood (1797–1879), American physician and writer
  - George Herbert Wood (1867–1949), Canadian businessman who co-founded Wood Gundy and Company
  - George Henry Wood (railway director) (born 1836), director of the Isle of Man Railway
  - George Henry Wood (statistician) (1874–1945), English labour statistician
  - George Ingersoll Wood (1814–1899), American clergyman
  - George O. Wood (1941–2022), current General Superintendent of the Assemblies of God
  - George Tyler Wood (1795–1858), governor of Texas
  - George W. Wood (1808–1871), US politician
  - George Warren Wood (1814–1901), Presbyterian minister and missionary
  - George William Wood (1781–1843), English businessman and MP
  - Wee Georgie Wood (1894–1979), English actor
- Gerald Wood (born 1926), Barbadian cricketer
- Gertrude Wood (1897–1998), American politician
- Gloria Wood (1923–1995), American singer and cartoon voice actress
- Gordon Wood (disambiguation), multiple people
  - Gordon Wood (American football coach) (1914–2003), high school football coach in Texas
  - Gordon Wood (rugby union) (1931–1982), rugby union footballer
  - Gordon S. Wood (1933–2026), American historian
- Graeme Wood (disambiguation), multiple people
  - Graeme Wood (businessman) (born 1947), Australian entrepreneur and environmentalist
  - Graeme Wood (cricketer) (born 1956), Australian former cricketer
  - Graeme Wood (journalist) (born 1979), American journalist and academic
- Graham Wood (disambiguation), several people
  - Graham Charles Wood (1934–2016), British corrosion scientist
  - Graham Wood (field hockey) (born 1936), Australian former field hockey player
  - Graham Wood (musician) (1971–2017), Australian jazz pianist
- Grant Wood (1891–1942), American painter

== H ==
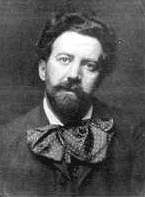
The conductor – Sir Henry Wood

- Harold Wood (disambiguation), multiple people
  - Harold D'Arcy Wood, minister, Uniting Church of Australia
  - Harold Wood (aviator) (1902–1980), English aviator and test pilot
  - Harold Kenneth Wood (1906–1972), US federal judge
  - Harold Wood (minister) (1896–1989), minister, Uniting Church of Australia
  - Harold Wood (weightlifter) (1889–1954), British Olympic weightlifter
- Harry Wood (disambiguation), multiple people
  - Harry Blanshard Wood (1882–1924), British soldier and Victoria Cross recipient
  - Harry E. Wood (1926–2009), United States federal judge
  - Harry Edwin Wood (1881–1946), English astronomer in South Africa
  - Harry Harvey Wood (1903–1977), co-founder of the Edinburgh International Festival
  - Harry O. Wood (1879–1958), American seismologist who updated the Mercalli Intensity Scale
  - Harry Wood (athlete) (1902–1975), British long-distance runner
  - Harry Wood (aviator) (1894–1959), World War I flying ace
  - Harry Wood (baseball) (1885–1955), baseball player
  - Henry Wood (cricketer, born 1853) (1853–1919), Henry "Harry" Wood, English cricketer
  - Harry Wood (footballer, born 1868) (1868–1951), England international footballer
  - Harry Wood (footballer, born 2002), English footballer for Hull City and Scunthorpe United
  - Harry Wood (Manitoba politician),
- Hart Wood (1880–1957), American architect
- Henry Wood (disambiguation), multiple people
  - Henry Alexander Wise Wood (1866–1939), American inventor
  - Henry Clay Wood (1832–1918), American Civil War general
  - Henry Conwell Wood (1840–1926), member of the Queensland Legislative Council
  - Harry Harvey Wood (Henry Harvey Wood 1903–1977), founder of the Edinburgh Festival
  - Henry Moses Wood (1788–1867), architect based in Nottingham
  - Henry Walter Wood (1825–1869), English architect
  - Henry Wise Wood (1860–1941), Alberta politician
  - Henry Wood (cricketer, born 1853) (1853–1919), English cricketer
  - Henry Wood (minstrel) (19th-century), minstrel show manager in New York City
  - Henry Wood (scholar) (1849–1925), American Professor of German Studies
  - Henry Wood (Somerset cricketer) (1872–1950),
  - Sir Evelyn Wood (British Army officer) Henry Evelyn Wood (1838–1919), British field marshal and Victoria Cross recipient
  - Sir Henry Wood (1869–1944), orchestral conductor
  - Sir Henry Wood, 1st Baronet (1597–1671), Member of Parliament of England for Hythe 1661–1671
- Horatio C. Wood Jr. (1841–1920), American physician and biologist
- Hugh Wood (1932–2021), composer
- Hugh Wood (cricketer) (1855–1941), English cricketer
- Hugh Wood (priest) (1859–1941), Royal Navy chaplain
- Hugh Wood (landowner) (1736–1814), British landowner

== I ==
- Ida Wood (1838–1932), American recluse
- Issy Wood (born 1993), American artist
- Ivor Wood (1932–2004), Anglo-French animator, director and producer of children's television series

== J ==
- Jack Wood (English cricketer) (born 1994), English cricketer
- James Wood (disambiguation), multiple people
  - James Athol Wood (1756–1829), British rear-admiral
  - James Edward Wood (1947–2004), American murderer
  - James Frederick Wood (1813–1883), Archbishop of Philadelphia
  - James Julius Wood (1800–1877), Scottish minister
  - James N. Wood (1941–2010), American director of the Art Institute of Chicago
  - James Roland Wood (born 1941), Australian Royal Commissioner and jurist
  - James Rushmore Wood (1816–1882), American physician
  - James Sebastian Lamin Wood, Sebastian Wood (born 1961), British Ambassador to China
  - James W. Wood (1924–1990), US Air Force colonel and senior test pilot on the Dyna-Soar program
  - James Wood (baseball) (born 2002), American baseball player
  - James Wood (Canadian admiral) (1934–2020), Canadian admiral
  - James Wood (musician), (born 1953), British composer, percussionist, and conductor
  - James Wood (critic) (born 1965), British literary critic and novelist
  - James Wood (encyclopaedist) (1820–1901), British editor of The Nuttall Encyclopaedia
  - James Wood (engineer), American engineer
  - James Wood (governor) (1741–1813), Governor of Virginia and officer in the American Revolutionary War
  - James Wood (musician) (born 1953), British composer and percussionist
  - James Wood (New York politician) (1820–1892), New York politician and Union Army general
  - James Wood (New Zealand cricketer) (1854–1937), New Zealand cricketer
  - James Wood (Irish politician) (1865–1936), Member of Parliament for East Down, 1902–1906
  - James Wood (footballer) (1893–?), professional footballer, who played for South Shields, Huddersfield Town and Blackpool
  - James Wood (screenwriter), British screenwriter
  - James Wood (South African cricketer) (born 1985), South African cricketer, played for Durham UCCE
  - James Wood (Lancashire cricketer) (1933–1977), English cricketer for Lancashire 1954–56
  - James Wood (mathematician) (1760–1839), Dean of Ely 1820–1839
  - James Wood (minister) (1672–1759), English Presbyterian minister
  - James Wood Bush (c. 1844–1906), Hawaiian-American Civil War combatant
  - Sir James Wood, 2nd Baronet (died 1738), Scottish officer of the Dutch States Army and later the British Army
  - James Wood, Lord Irwin (born 1977), British courtesy peer
- Jamie Wood (born 1978), footballer
- Jason Wood (disambiguation), multiple people
  - Jason Wood (baseball) (born 1969), former Major League Baseball player
  - Jason Wood (comedian) (1972–2010), British comedian
  - Jason Wood (musician), lead singer of metalcore band It Dies Today
  - Jason Wood (politician) (born 1968), Australian politician
  - Jason Wood (writer), British writer
- Jeff Wood (disambiguation), multiple people
  - Jeff Wood (footballer) (born 1954), English former football goalkeeper
  - Jeff Wood (racing driver) (born 1957), former race car driver
  - Jeff Wood (singer) (born 1968), country music artist
- Jefferson Wood (born 1973), American Illustrator
- Jeffery Lee Wood (born 1973), prisoner on Texas death row
- Jeffery Wood (born 1986), American actor
- Jeffrey Wood (born 1969), Canadian politician
- Jim Wood (American football) (born 1936), American gridiron football player and coach
- Jim Wood (Arkansas politician) (fl. late 20th century), State Auditor of Arkansas
- Jim Wood (biathlete) (1952–2020), British Olympic biathlete
- Jim Wood (California politician) (born 1960), member of the California State Assembly
- Jim Wood (fiddler) (born 1964), American fiddler
- Jim Wood (Sussex cricketer) (1914–1989), English cricketer, played for Sussex 1936–55
- Jimmy Wood (1842–1927), American baseball player and manager
- Joanna E. Wood (1867–1927), sometimes known as Nelly Wood, was a Canadian novelist
- Joe Wood (disambiguation), multiple people
  - Smoky Joe Wood (1889–1985), American baseball player
  - Joe T. Wood (1922–2019), American politician
  - Joe Wood (infielder) (1919–1985), American baseball player
  - Joe Wood (pitcher) (1916–2002), American baseball player
  - Joe Wood (footballer) (1904–1972), Australian footballer for North Melbourne
  - Joe Wood (musician) (fl. c. 1980), with T.S.O.L.'s second complement of musicians
- John Wood (disambiguation), multiple people
  - J. A. Wood (1837–1910), American architect
  - John Augustus Wood (1818–1878), British soldier and Victoria Cross recipient
  - John B. Wood (1827–1884), American journalist
  - John C. Wood (born 1949), British professor of mathematics
  - John C. Wood, birth name of actor John Fortune
  - John Cunningham Wood (born 1952), Australian professor of economics
  - John F. Wood Jr. (1936–2023), member of the Maryland House of Delegates
  - John Fisher Wood (1852–1899), Canadian Member of Parliament from Ontario
  - John George Corry Wood (1869–1943), English-born political figure in British Columbia
  - John George Wood (1827–1889), British natural history writer
  - John Graeme Wood (1933–2007), veteran of the British far right and member of the British Peoples Party
  - John H. Wood Jr. (1916–1979), U.S. federal judge
  - John Henry Wood (1841–1914), English entomologist
  - John J. Wood (1784–1874), U.S. Representative from New York
  - John L. Wood (born 1964), American chemist
  - John M. Wood (general), United States Air Force major general
  - John M. Wood (politician) (1813–1864), U.S. Representative from Maine
  - John Medley Wood (1827–1915), South African botanist known for sugarcane work
  - John Muir Wood (1805–1892), Scottish musician, piano manufacturer, and photographer
  - John Nicholas Wood, British neurobiologist
  - John Page Wood (1796–1866), English cleric and baronet
  - John Philip Wood (died 1838), Scottish antiquary and biographer
  - John Shirley Wood (1888–1966), United States Army general
  - John Stephens Wood (1885–1968), chairman of the House Un-American Activities Committee
  - John Taylor Wood (1830–1904), U.S. Navy, Confederate Navy
  - John Thomas Archer Wood (c. 1872–1954), English footballer
  - John Travers Wood (1878–1954), U.S. Representative from Idaho
  - John Turtle Wood (1821–1890), British architect, engineer, and archaeologist
  - John Warrington Wood (1839–1886), British sculptor
  - John William Wood Sr. (1855–1928), North Carolina State Representative, founder of Benson, North Carolina
  - John Wood (activist) (born 1964), education activist, marketing director at Microsoft
  - John Wood (actor, born 1909) (1909–1965), Australian actor
  - John Wood (actor, born 1946), Australian actor
  - John Wood (artist) (1922–2012), American artist
  - John Wood (American football) (born 1951), American football player
  - John Wood (Australian cricketer) (1865–1928), Australian cricketer
  - John Wood (Australian politician) (1829–1914), Victorian and Tasmanian Legislative Assemblies
  - John Wood (baseball) (1872–1929), baseball player
  - John Wood (Bradford manufacturer) (1793–1871), English industrialist and factory reformer
  - John Wood (canoeist) (1950–2013), Canadian Olympic flatwater canoer
  - John Wood (MP for Preston) (1790–1856), British civil servant
  - John Wood (civil servant, born 1870) (1870–1933), English cricketer and civil servant in the Indian Civil Service
  - John Wood (congressman) (1816–1898), U.S. Representative from Pennsylvania
  - John Wood (cormorant keeper), servant of James VI and I
  - John Wood (cricketer, born 1970), English cricketer
  - John Wood (design theorist) (born 1945), British professor of design
  - John Wood (died 1458), English MP for Worcester and Worcestershire
  - John Wood (diplomat) (born 1944), New Zealand diplomat
  - John Wood (English actor) (1930–2011), known for Shakespearean roles and his association with Tom Stoppard
  - John Wood (explorer) (1812–1871), Scottish explorer of central Asia
  - John Wood (Florida politician) (born 1952), member of the Florida House of Representatives
  - John Wood (footballer, born 1880) (1880–1916), English footballer
  - John Wood (footballer, born 1884) (1884–1959), English footballer
  - John Wood (footballer, born 1948), English footballer
  - John Wood (Illinois politician) (1798–1880), governor of Illinois 1860–1861
  - John Wood (Isle of Man governor) (1722–1777), Governor of the Isle of Man, 1761–1777
  - John Wood (Kent cricketer, born 1745) (1745–1816), English cricketer
  - John Wood (mathematician) (c.1775–1822), American professor of mathematics
  - John Wood (millowner) (1758–?), created the Howard Town Mills complex in Glossop, England
  - John Wood (MP for Bossiney) (died 1623), English MP for Bossiney
  - John Wood (MP for Ipswich), English MP for Ipswich in 1420
  - John Wood (MP for Preston) (1789–1856), British MP for Preston
  - John Wood (New Zealand cricketer) (1839–1909), New Zealand cricketer
  - John Wood (photographer), Civil War photographer for Union Army
  - John Wood (poet) (1947–2022), American poet and historian of photography
  - John Wood (professor of law) (1932–2014), British law professor
  - John Wood (racing driver, born 1952), CART driver
  - John Wood (record producer), English record producer
  - John Wood (rugby league) (born 1956), Great Britain and Leigh
  - John Wood (Scottish courtier) (died 1570), secretary to Regent Moray
  - John Wood (Scottish footballer) (1894–1971), Scottish forward
  - John Wood (speaker) (died 1484), English MP and Speaker of the House of Commons
  - John Wood (surgeon) (1825–1891), British surgeon at King's College Hospital
  - John Wood (Surrey cricketer, born 1744) (1744–1793), English cricketer
  - John Wood I of Keele, English MP for Newcastle-under-Lyme
  - John Wood II of Keele, English MP for Newcastle-under-Lyme
  - John Wood, the Elder (1704–1754), English architect, known for Queen Square and The Circus in Bath
  - John Wood, the Younger (1728–1782), English architect (son of John Wood), known for the Royal Crescent in Bath
  - Jon Wood, NASCAR driver
  - Mrs. John Wood (1831–1915), British actor
  - Sir John Wood, 1st Baronet, British Member of Parliament
- Julia A. Wood (1840–1927), American writer, composer
- Julia Amanda Sargent Wood Minnie Mary Lee (1825–1903), American author
- Julius Wood (born 2001), American football player
- Juston Wood (born 1979), American football player

== K ==
- Keith Wood, (born 1972), rugby union player for Ireland, Harlequin F.C. and Munster Rugby
- Keith Porteous Wood (born 1947), Executive Director of the National Secular Society (UK)
- Kerry Wood (born 1977), American baseball player
- Kimba Wood (born 1944), American Federal judge

== L ==
- Leonard Wood (1860–1927), US Army Chief of Staff and Governor General of the Philippines
- Leon Wood (born 1962), American basketball player and basketball game official
- Leon J. Wood (1918–1977), American theologian
- Lynn Faulds Wood (1948–2020), Scottish television presenter and journalist

== M ==
- Malcolm Wood, British-Chinese entrepreneur and restaurateur
- Mark Wood (disambiguation), multiple people
  - Mark Wood (bishop) (1919–2014), Bishop of Matabeleland and Bishop of Ludlow
  - Mark Wood (businessman) (born 1953), British businessman
  - Mark Wood (cricketer) (born 1990), English cricketer
  - Mark Wood (explorer) (born 1967), British Arctic and Antarctic explorer
  - Mark Wood (footballer) (born 1972), English professional footballer
  - Mark Wood (Medal of Honor) (1839–1866), American Civil War Medal of Honor recipient
  - Mark Wood (violinist), electric violinist and former string master of the Trans-Siberian Orchestra
  - Sir Mark Wood, 1st Baronet (1750–1829), British Member of Parliament for Newark, Milborne Port and Gatton
- Marshall Wood (c.1834–1882), English sculptor
- Marshall Wood, vocalist for Michigan heavy metal band Battlecross
- Martin Wood (disambiguation), multiple people
  - Martin Wood (director), Canadian television director
  - Martin Wood (engineer) (1927–2021), co-founder of Oxford Instruments
  - Martin Wood (rugby league) (born 1970), English former Rugby League footballer
  - Martin B. Wood (1807–1881), American farmer, banker, telegraph installer and shareholder
- Mary Wood (disambiguation), multiple people
  - Mary Antonia Wood (born 1959), American painter and sculptor
  - Mary C. F. Hall-Wood (died 1899), poet, editor, and author
  - Mary Christina Wood (born 1962), professor of law and author
  - Mary Elizabeth Wood (1861–1931), American librarian and missionary
  - Mary Evelyn Wood (1900–1978), politician and nurse in the Cayman Islands
  - Mary Inez Wood (1866–1945), American writer
  - Mary Knight Wood (1857–1944), American pianist, music educator, and composer
  - Mary Myfanwy Wood (1882–1967), British missionary in China
  - Mary Ramsey Wood (died 1908), American pioneer
  - Mary Wood-Allen (1841–1908), American doctor, social reformer, lecturer, and writer
  - Mary Wood, Viscountess Halifax (1807–1884), English noblewoman
  - Mary Wood (baseball), AAGPBL player
- Matthew Wood (disambiguation), multiple people
  - Matthew Wood, killed in the January 2013 Vauxhall helicopter crash
  - Matthew W. Wood (1879–1969), farmer and political figure on Prince Edward Island
  - Matthew Wood (cricketer, born 1977), English cricketer with Glamorgan CCC
  - Matthew Wood (cricketer, born 1980), English cricketer with Nottinghamshire, previously played for Somerset
  - Matthew Wood (cricketer, born 1985), English cricketer
  - Matthew Wood (ice hockey) (born 2005), Canadian ice hockey player
  - Matthew Wood (rugby league) (born 1969), Australian rugby league footballer
  - Matthew Wood (sound editor) (born 1972), American sound editor and voice actor
  - Sir Matthew Wood, 1st Baronet (1768–1843), MP and Lord Mayor of London
  - Sir Matthew Wood, 4th Baronet (1857–1908), English cricketer
  - Merlyn Wood (stage name of William Wood), member of Brockhampton (band)
- Michael Wood (disambiguation), multiple people
  - Michael M. Wood (21st century), American diplomat and ambassador
  - Michael Wood (academic) (active since 1971), former chair of the Princeton University English Department
  - Michael Wood (cryptographer), American author The Jesus Secret 2010
  - Michael Wood (doctor) (1918–1987), British doctor in East Africa
  - Michael Wood (historian) (born 1948), British historian and television presenter
  - Michael Wood (lawyer) (born 1947), British lawyer and former chief advisor to the Foreign and Commonwealth Office
  - Michael Wood (New Zealand politician) (born 1980), New Zealand member of parliament
  - Michael Wood (rugby union) (born 1999), Australian rugby union player
  - Michael Wood (special effects artist), American special effects artist
  - Mick Wood (footballer, born 1952), English association footballer
  - Mick Wood (footballer, born 1962), English association footballer
  - Mike Wood (American football) (1954–2009), American football player
  - Mike Wood (baseball) (born 1980), American baseball player
  - Mike Wood (Conservative politician) (born 1976), MP for Dudley South since May 2015
  - Mike Wood (curler) (born 1968), Canadian curler
  - Mike Wood (fencer) (born 1971), South African épée fencer
  - Mike Wood (Labour politician) (born 1946), British MP for Batley and Spen from 1997 to 2015
- Miles Wood (born 1995), American ice hockey player
- Mimie Wood (1888–1979), New Zealand administrator, born as Susan Selina Wood
- Moses Wood (born 1999), American basketball player

== N ==
- Naomi Wood (born 1983), British writer
- Natalie Wood (1938–1981), American actress
- Nick Wood (rugby union) (born 1983), English rugby union player
- Norman Wood (disambiguation), multiple people
  - Norman Barton Wood (1857–1933), American author, minister, and lecturer
  - Norman Wood (badminton), English badminton player
  - Norman Wood (footballer, born 1889) (1889–1916), English footballer
  - Norman Wood (footballer, born 1932), English footballer for Sunderland
  - Norman Wood (golfer) (1947–2023), Scottish golfer
  - Norman Wood (politician) (1891–1988), member of the Pennsylvania House of Representatives

== O ==
- Otto Wood (1894–1930), American criminal

== P ==
- Paul Wood (disambiguation), multiple people
  - Paul Hamilton Wood (1907–1962), Australian cardiologist
  - Paul Wood (footballer) (born 1964), English former footballer
  - Paul Wood (journalist), correspondent for the BBC
  - Paul Wood (rugby league) (born 1981), English rugby league footballer
  - Peter Wood, 3rd Earl of Halifax (born 1944), British peer
- Peggy Wood (1892–1978), American actress
- Pete Wood (1867–1923), Canadian-American Major League Baseball pitcher
- Peter Wood (disambiguation), multiple people
  - Peter H. Wood (born 1943), American historian and author
  - Peter Hill-Wood (1936–2018), English businessman
  - Peter K. Wood (born 1984), American entertainer and magician
  - Peter Van Wood (1927–2010), Dutch guitarist, singer, songwriter, actor, and astrologer
  - Peter W. Wood, American anthropologist; president of the National Association of Scholars
  - Peter Wood, Australian businessman and founding partner G. Wood, Son & Co.
  - Peter Wood (businessman), founder of insurance companies Direct Line and Esure
  - Peter Wood (cricketer) (1951–2022), English cricketer
  - Peter Wood (director) (1925–2016), English theatre director
  - Peter Wood (footballer, born 1939), Australian rules football player for Footscray
  - Peter Wood (footballer, born 1946), Australian rules football player for Fitzroy
  - Peter Wood (Australian politician) (1935–2010), member of the Queensland Legislative Assembly

== Q ==
- Qualeasha Wood (born 1996), American textile artist

== R ==
- Ralph Wood (1715–1772) and his son and grandson of same name, English potters
- Ralph W Wood (1902–1987), amateur composer and music writer
- Ray Wood (1931–2002), English footballer, goalkeeper for Manchester United
- Rex Wood (1909–1970), South Australian artist in Portugal
- Robert Wood (disambiguation), multiple people
  - Robert B. Wood (1836–1878), American Civil War sailor and Medal of Honor recipient
  - Robert Coldwell Wood (1923–2005), American political scientist and academic
  - Robert E. Wood (1879–1969), American soldier and businessman
  - Robert E. Wood (painter, born 1971) (born 1971), Canadian landscape artist
  - Robert J. Wood (1905–1986), US Army general
  - Robert James Wood (1886–1954), Liberal party member of the Canadian House of Commons
  - Robert S. Wood (born 1936), American military leader and Mormon leader
  - Robert Stanford Wood (1886–1963), civil servant and educational administrator
  - Robert W. Wood (1868–1955), American physicist and writer
  - Robert Watson Wood (1923–2018), American clergyman, LGBT rights activist, and author
  - Robert William Wood (1889–1979), American landscape artist
  - Robert Wood (American politician) (1885–1964), Wisconsin State Assemblyman
  - Robert Wood (antiquarian) (1717–1771), English civil servant and politician
  - Robert Wood (artist), accused and acquitted of the Camden Town murder
  - Robert Wood (Australian politician) (born 1949), senator for New South Wales
  - Robert Wood (Australian rugby player) (born 1948), rugby union player for Australia
  - Robert Wood (mayor), English politician, mayor of Norwich
  - Robert Wood (mathematician) (1622–1685), English mathematician
  - Robert Wood (psychologist) (born 1941), British psychologist and writer
  - Robert Wood (roboticist), Harvard University professor and innovator in robotics
  - Robert Wood (rugby, born 1872) (1872–1928), rugby league footballer who played in the 1890s
  - Robert Wood (sailor) (1926–2004), American Olympic sailor
  - Robert Wood (timber merchant) (1792–1847), claimed to be the son of Prince Edward Augustus of the UK
  - Robert Wood (television executive) (1925–1986), American television executive
  - Robert Wood (timber merchant) (1792–1847), Canadian who claimed to be son of Prince Edward Augustus
- Robin Wood (comics) (1944–2021), Paraguayan comic book writer and author
- Roger Wood (disambiguation), multiple people
  - Roger Leigh-Wood (1906–1987), English Olympic athlete
  - Roger Wood (governor) (died 1654), governor of Bermuda, 1629–1637
  - Roger Wood (journalist) (1925–2012), Belgian-born British editor
- Ron Wood (Australian footballer) (1923–1978), Australian rules footballer with Geelong
- Ronnie Wood (born 1947), musician, member of The Rolling Stones
- Ronnie Wood (ice hockey) (born 1960), Scottish professional ice hockey player
- Roy Wood (disambiguation), multiple people
  - Roy Wood (born 1946), musician with The Move, Electric Light Orchestra and Wizzard
  - Roy Wood Jr. (1978), American comedian and actor
  - Roy Wood Sr. (1915–1995), American radio pioneer, civil rights journalist, commentator, college professor
  - Roy Wood (baseball) (1892–1974), baseball player
- Royden Wood (1930–2023), English footballer

== S ==
- S. A. M. Wood (1823–1891), Confederate Civil War General
- Samuel Wood (disambiguation), multiple people
  - Samuel H. Wood, American scientist who cloned himself
  - Samuel Newitt Wood (1825–1891), American populist politician from Kansas
  - Samuel Peploe Wood (1827–1873), English artist
  - Sam Wood (1884–1949), American film director
  - Sam Wood (artist), game artist
  - Sam Wood (archaeologist), British archaeologist and TV presenter
  - Sam Wood (cricketer) (born 1993), English cricketer
  - Sam Wood (footballer) (born 1986), English footballer
  - Sam Wood (rugby league, born 1994), English rugby league player
  - Sam Wood (rugby league, born 1997), English rugby league player
  - Samuel Wood (Lower Canada politician) (1787–1848), farmer and political figure in Lower Canada
  - Samuel Wood (Ontario politician) (1830–1913), Canadian politician
  - Samuel Wood (philanthropist) (fl. 1831), a founder of the New York Institute for the Blind
- Sandra Scarr Sandra Wood Scarr (1936–2021), American psychologist
- Sara Anne Wood (born 1981), American girl (Disappearance of Sara Anne Wood) who disappeared in 1993
- Scott Wood (born 1990), American basketball player
- Scott Wood (American football) (born 1968), American football player
- Sebastian Wood (born 1961), British Ambassador to China
- Sidney Wood (1911–2009)), American tennis player
- Sidney Wood (phonetician) (born 1934), British-born retired Swedish phonetician and Research Fellow
- Silas Wood (1769–1847), US Congressman from New York State
- Smoky Joe Wood, (1889–1985) American baseball player
- Spencer S. Wood (1861–1940), US Navy rear admiral
- Stan Wood (footballer), (1905–1967) English football player
- Steve Wood (disambiguation), multiple people
  - Steven Wood (1961–1995), Australian canoeist
  - Stephen Mosher Wood, Kansas politician
  - Stephen W. Wood, Republican assemblyman from North Carolina
  - Stephen Wood (ice hockey) (born 1981), American ice hockey coach and player
  - Steve Wood (born 1963), American first bishop of the Anglican Diocese of the Carolinas
  - Steve Wood (footballer, born February 1963), English football player for Reading
  - Steve Wood (footballer, born June 1963), English football player
  - Steve Wood (tennis) (born 1962), Australian tennis player
  - Steven Wood, founder of Northern Cree Singers
- Sue Wood (Suzanne Wood, born 1948), New Zealand politician
- Susan Wood (disambiguation), multiple people
  - Susan Buxton Wood (1918–2006), British writer, philanthropist
  - Susan F. Wood, American public health professor
  - Susan Selina Wood (1888–1979), birth name of the New Zealand administrator known as Mimie Wood,
  - Susan Wood (New Zealand writer) (1836–1880)
  - Susan Wood (pharmacologist) (1952–1998), British pharmacologist and medical regulator
  - Susan Wood (poet) (born 1946), professor at Rice University
  - Susan Wood (science fiction) (1948–1980), Canadian professor, critic, and science fiction fan
  - Susan Wood (television presenter), former news presenter from New Zealand

== T ==
- Tatjana Wood (1926–2026), German-born American artist and comic book colorist
- Theresa Wood, American politician in Vermont
- Thomas Wood (disambiguation), multiple people
  - E. Thomas Wood (born 1963), American journalist and author
  - Leslie Wood (footballer) (Thomas Leslie Wooborn, 1932–2005), English footballer
  - Thomas Harold Wood (1889–1965), Canadian politician
  - Thomas J. Wood (1823–1906), Union General during the American Civil War
  - Thomas Jefferson Wood (1844–1908), US Representative from Indiana
  - Thomas McKinnon Wood (1855–1927), British Liberal politician
  - Thomas Mills Wood (born 1963), American film and television character actor
  - Thomas Peploe Wood (1817–1845), English artist
  - Thomas Waterman Wood (1823–1903), American painter
  - Thomas Wood (1708–1799), British MP for Middlesex
  - Thomas Wood (1777–1860), British MP for Breconshire
  - Thomas Wood (1815–98) (1815–1898), Canadian politician
  - Thomas Wood (bishop of Bedford) (1885–1961), Anglican suffragan bishop
  - Thomas Wood (bishop of Lichfield and Coventry) (1607–1692), Anglican diocesan bishop
  - Thomas Wood (British Army officer) (1804–1872), British MP for Middlesex
  - Thomas Wood (composer) (1892–1950), English composer and author
  - Thomas Wood (Derbyshire cricketer) (born 1994), English cricketer
  - Thomas Wood (died 1502) (died 1502), English judge and politician
  - Thomas Wood (mayor) (1792–1861), mayor of Columbus, Ohio
  - Thomas Wood (priest) (c. 1499 – c. 1588), Roman Catholic chaplain to Queen Mary of England
  - Thomas Wood (reverend) (1711–1778), minister in Halifax, Nova Scotia, Canada
  - Thomas Wood (Somerset cricketer) (1861–1933), English cricketer
- Tom Wood (disambiguation), multiple people
  - Tom Wood (author), British author of thriller novels
  - Tom Wood (ice hockey) (1927–2015), Canadian ice hockey player
  - Tom Wood (photographer) (born 1951)
  - Tom Wood (rugby union) (born 1986), English rugby union player
  - Tom Wood (visual effects), visual effects supervisor
- Ty Wood (born 1995), Canadian actor

== U ==
- Ursula Wood (artist) (1868–1925?), English artist

== V ==
- Victor Wood (1946–2021), Filipino singer
- Victoria Wood (1953–2016), British comedian
- Virgil Wood (1931–2024), American civil rights activist and former Baptist minister
- Virginia Hargraves Wood (c. 1872–1941), American painter and illustrator
- Virginia Hargraves Wood (1906–?), American painter and WPA muralist

== W ==
- W. A. R. Wood (William Alfred Rae Wood) (1878–1970), British diplomat in Siam
- Wallace Wood, (1927–1981), American writer-illustrator
- Walter Wood (disambiguation), multiple people
  - Walter A. Wood (1815–1892), New York politician
  - Walter Bertram Wood (1898–1917), World War I flying ace
  - Walter Childs Wood (1864–1953), American surgeon and politician
  - Walter Quarry Wood (1888–1958), Scottish surgeon
  - Walter W. Wood (1894–1980), American football player and a football, basketball, and baseball coach
  - Walter Wood (athlete) (1914–1972), American Olympic athlete
  - Walter Wood (freestyle skier) (born 1992), American freestyle skier
  - Walter Wood (producer) (1921–2010), American film producer
  - Walter Wood (Scouting) (1876–1981), Canadian active in the Boy Scouts
- Warren L. Wood (1910–1980), American politician
- Wilbur Wood (1941–2026), American pro baseball player
- Wilbur Wood (sportswriter) (1892–1968), American sportswriter and editor
- Wilfred Wood (1897–1982), British soldier and Victoria Cross recipient
- Wilfred Wood (bishop) (born 1936), first Black bishop in the Church of England
- Wilfrid Wood (1888–1976), English artist
- William Wood (disambiguation), multiple people
  - Will Wood, American alternative singer-songwriter and lead singer of The Tapeworms
  - William Alan Wood (1916–2010), British civil servant
  - William B. Wood (actor) (1779–1861), theatre manager and actor
  - William B. Wood (builder), American builder/contractor in Kentucky
  - William Braucher Wood (born 1950), US diplomat
  - William Bruce Wood (1848–1928), Canadian manufacturer and political figure
  - William D. Wood (1822–1867), American Union brevet brigadier general
  - William H. Wood, president of the National Association of Letter Carriers, 1889–90
  - William H. Wood (American football) (1900–1988), American athlete and football coach
  - William Halsey Wood (1855–1897), American architect
  - William Henry O'Malley Wood (1856–1941), Australian banker, public servant and surveyor
  - William Henry Wood, British trade unionist, active in the 1860s
  - William Holmes Wood (1900–1988), college football coach
  - William J. Wood (1877–1954), Canadian painter and etcher
  - William Madison Wood (1858–1926), mill owner from Massachusetts
  - William McKenzie Wood, Canadian ambassador to Israel
  - William Maxwell Wood (1809–1880), first Surgeon General of the US Navy
  - William P. Wood (1820–1903), first Director of the United States Secret Service
  - William R. Wood (Indiana politician) (1861–1933), US Representative from Indiana
  - William Ransom Wood (1907–2001), president of the University of Alaska, 1960–1973
  - William Robertson Wood (1874–1947), Presbyterian minister and politician in Manitoba, Canada
  - William Thomas Wood (1854–1943), New Zealand politician
  - William Valentine Wood (1883–1959), President of the London, Midland and Scottish Railway, 1941–1947
  - William W. Wood (1818–1882), head of the Bureau of Steam Engineering, 1873–1877
  - William Wightman Wood (fl. 1804–1833), American journalist, businessman and poet
  - William Willis Wood (mayor) (1844–1905), English Wesleyan Methodist preacher, mill owner, and mayor of Bradford, Yorkshire
  - William Wood (15th century MP), MP for Winchester, 1413
  - William Wood, 1st Baron Hatherley (1801–1881), British statesman
  - William Wood (athlete) (1881–1940), Canadian track and field athlete
  - William Wood (Australian politician) (1869–1953), Australian politician
  - William Wood (banker) (1808–1894), Scottish-American banker
  - William Wood (botanist) (1745–1808), English Unitarian clergyman, botanist and activist
  - William Wood (cricketer) (1849–1924), Australian cricketer
  - William Wood (diver) (1946–2000), English competition diver
  - William Wood (footballer, born 1900) (1900–?), English football player for Aberdare Athletic and Stoke
  - William Wood (footballer, born 1904) (1904–1961), English footballer, goalkeeper for Rochdale
  - William Wood (footballer, born April 1910) (1910–?), English football defender
  - William Wood (footballer, born June 1910) (1910–1958), English footballer
  - William Wood (footballer, born 1996), English football defender
  - William Wood (historian) (1864–1947), Canadian historian
  - William Wood (ironmaster) (1671–1730), British ironmaster and coin mintmaster
  - William Wood (MP for Berkshire), Member of Parliament (MP) for Berkshire, 1395
  - William Wood (MP for Pontefract) (1816–1872), British MP for Pontefract
  - William Wood (naturalist) (1822–1885), American physician and naturalist
  - William Wood (New Zealand politician) (1827–1884), New Zealand politician from Invercargill & Mataura
  - William Wood (rower) (1899–1969), Canadian rower and Olympic silver medalist
  - William Wood (Scottish surgeon) (1782–1858),
  - William Wood (screenwriter), American screenwriter
  - William Wood (Texas politician), member of the Twentieth Texas Legislature
  - William Wood (trade unionist) (1873–1956), British trade union leader
  - William Wood (ventriloquist) (c. 1861–1908), American illusionist and ventriloquist
  - William Wood (wrestler) (1888–1971), British wrestler
  - William Wood (zoologist) (1774–1857), English entomologist
  - William Wood-Sims (1858–1925), English cricketer
- Willie Wood (disambiguation), multiple people
  - Willie Wood (American football) (1936–2020), American football player
  - Willie Wood (bowler) (born 1938), Scottish professional bowls player
  - Willie Wood (footballer) (1878–1947), scored for Bury F.C. in the 1900 and 1903 FA Cup finals
  - Willie Wood (golfer) (born 1960), American golfer
- Willis A. Wood (1921–2021), American microbiologist, inventor, and entrepreneur
- Wilson Wood (actor) (1915–2014), American character actor
- Wilson Wood (footballer) (1943–2017), Scottish footballer

== Z ==
- Zach Wood (born 1993), American football player

== See also ==
- Woode (surname)

=== First name unknown ===
- Wood (baseball), baseball player

=== Fictional characters ===
- Oliver Wood (Harry Potter), a character from the Harry Potter novel series by J. K. Rowling
