= Susan Wood =

Susan Wood may refer to:

- Susan Wood (visual artist) (1953–2018), Canadian artist
- Susan Wood (literary scholar) (1948–1980), Canadian professor, critic, and science fiction fan
- Susan Wood (poet) (born 1946), professor at Rice University
- Susan Wood (pharmacologist) (1952–1998), British pharmacologist and medical regulator
- Susan Wood (photographer) (born 1932), American photographer
- Susan F. Wood (1958–2025), American public health professor
- Susan Wood (television presenter), former news presenter from New Zealand
- Susan Buxton Wood (1918–2006), British writer, philanthropist
- Susan Wood (New Zealand writer) (1836–1880)
- Susan Selina Wood, birth name of the New Zealand administrator known as Mimie Wood (1888–1979)

== See also ==
- Sue Wood (Suzanne Wood, born 1948), New Zealand politician
- Susie Wood (Susanna Wood, born 1976), New Zealand microbiologist
