= Douglas Wood =

Douglas Wood may refer to:

- Douglas Wood (writer), American actor, writer, producer of television shows and animated movies
- Douglas Wood (naturalist) (born 1951), American author and musician
- Douglas Wood (engineer) (1941–2019), engineer taken hostage in Iraq in 2005
- Douglas Wood (actor) (1880–1966), American film actor
- Douglas E. Wood, American thoracic surgeon and academic
- Doug Wood (pole vaulter) (born 1966), Canadian athlete in pole-vault
- Dougie Wood (1940–2022), Scottish athlete and coach in football

== See also ==
- Buster Bloodvessel (born 1958), born Douglas Woods, English singer
