= Norman Wood =

Norman Wood may refer to:

- Norman Wood (golfer) (1947–2023), Scottish golfer
- Norman Wood (badminton), English badminton player
- Norman Wood (footballer, born 1890) (1890–1916), English footballer
- Norman Wood (footballer, born 1932) (1932–2022), English footballer for Sunderland
- Norman Wood (politician) (1891–1988), member of the Pennsylvania House of Representatives
- Norman Barton Wood (1857–1933), American author, minister, and lecturer
- R. Norman Wood (?–2015), American ice hockey player and coach

== See also ==
- Norman Woods (1936–2015), New Zealand cricketer
- Norman H. Woods (died 1987), North American golf course architect
