= Benjamin Wood =

Benjamin Wood may refer to:

- Benjamin Wood (MP) (1787–1845), British Whig politician
- Benjamin Wood (American politician) (1820–1900), U.S. representative from New York and publishing entrepreneur
- Benjamin Wood (cricketer) (born 1971), English cricketer
- Benjamin Wood (writer) (born 1981), British author and academic
- Benjamin D. Wood (1894–1986), American educator, researcher, and director
- Benjamin T. Wood, American architect
- Ben Wood (born 1980), British visual artist
