= Elizabeth Wood =

Elizabeth Wood may refer to:

- Elizabeth Boleyn (lady-in-waiting) (née Wood, fl. 1530s), one of the chief witnesses against her niece, Anne Boleyn
- Elizabeth Wood (housing director) (1899–1993), Chicago Housing Authority Executive Director
- Elizabeth Wyn Wood (1903–1966), Canadian sculptor
- Elizabeth A. Wood (1912–2006), American crystallographer
- Beth Wood (born 1954), North Carolina public official and accountant
- Elizabeth Wood (director), American film director

== See also ==
- Elisabeth Jean Wood, American political scientist
