= Governor Wood =

Governor Wood may refer to:

- Edward Wood, 1st Earl of Halifax (1881–1959), Governor-General of India from 1926 to 1931
- George Tyler Wood (1795–1858), 2nd Governor of Texas
- James Wood (governor) (1741–1813), 11th Governor of Virginia
- John Wood (Illinois politician) (1798–1880), 12th Governor of Illinois
- Leonard Wood (1860–1927), Governor-General of Cuba from 1899 to 1902 and Governor-General of the Philippines from 1921 to 1927
- Reuben Wood (1793–1864), 21st Governor of Ohio
- Roger Wood (governor) (died 1654), Governor of Bermuda from 1629 to 1637

== See also ==
- George Lemuel Woods (1832–1890), 3rd Governor of Oregon
