= Barry Wood =

Barry Wood may refer to:

- Wardy Joubert III (1971–2016), American preacher, football coach, and internet meme subject
- Barry Wood (bishop) (1942–2017), South African Roman Catholic bishop
- Barry Wood (cricketer) (born 1942), English former cricketer
- Barry Wood (singer) (1909–1970), American singer and television producer
- Barry Wood (American football) (1910–1971), American football player and medical educator
- William Barry Wood III (1938–2024), American molecular and developmental biologist
- Barry Wood (interior designer) (born 1971), model, American television host, and interior decorator
- Barry Wood (rugby league) (born 1950), Australian rugby league footballer
