= Paul Wood =

Paul Wood may refer to:

- Paul Wood (footballer) (born 1964), English former footballer
- Paul Wood (rugby league) (born 1981), English rugby league footballer
- Paul Wood (journalist), correspondent for the BBC
- Paul Hamilton Wood (1907–1962), Australian cardiologist
- Paul Wood (author), New Zealand motivational speaker, author, life coach, and psychologist

== See also ==
- List of people with surname Wood
