= Roy Wood (disambiguation) =

Roy Wood is an English musician.

Roy Wood is also the name of:

- Roy Wood (baseball) (1892–1974), American baseball player
- Roy Wood Sr. (1915–1995) American radio pioneer, civil rights journalist, commentator, college professor, and entrepreneur
- Roy Wood Jr. (born 1978), American comedian
- Royden Wood (1930–2023), English footballer

== See also ==
- Roy Woods, Canadian rapper
- Roy Wood Sellars (1880–1973), American philosopher
