= Roger Wood =

Roger Wood may refer to:

- Roger Wood (colonial administrator) (died 1654), governor of Bermuda, 1629–1637
- Roger Wood (engineer), British electrical engineer
- Roger Wood (journalist) (1925–2012), Belgian-born British editor
- Roger Leigh-Wood (1906–1987), English Olympic athlete
