= Bernard Wood =

Bernard Wood may refer to:

- Bernard Wood (cricketer) (1886–1974), New Zealand cricketer, golfer and businessman
- Bernard Wood (geologist), British geologist
- Bernard Wood (paleoanthropologist), British paleoanthropologist
- Bernie Wood (1939–2013), New Zealand rugby league administrator and sports historian
