= Martin Wood =

Martin Wood may refer to:

- Martin Wood (director), Canadian television director
- Sir Martin Wood (engineer) (1927–2021), British engineer, co-founder of Oxford Instruments
- Martin Wood (rugby league) (born 1970), English former rugby league footballer
- Martin B. Wood (1807–1881), American farmer, banker, telegraph installer and shareholder
