= Craig Wood =

Craig Wood may refer to:

- Craig Wood (golfer) (1901–1968), professional golfer
- Craig Wood (guitarist) (born 1978), guitarist for Avril Lavigne
- Craig Wood (film editor), film editor
- Craig Wood, an entry on the List of Sites of Special Scientific Interest in Cumnock and Kyle
- Craig Wood, American who murdered Hailey Owens

== See also ==
- Craig Woods, actor from the 1940s
