= Jeff Wood =

Jeff Wood may refer to:

- Jeff Wood (footballer) (born 1954), English former football goalkeeper
- Jeff Wood (racing driver) (born 1957), former race car driver
- Jeff Wood (singer) (born 1968), country music artist
- Jefferson Wood (born 1973), American Illustrator
- Jeffery Lee Wood (born 1973), prisoner on Texas death row
- Jeffery Wood (born 1986), American actor
- Jeffrey Wood (born 1969), politician
