= Mark Woods =

Mark Woods may refer to:

- Mark Woods (sportswriter) (born 1972), sports writer and broadcaster based in Edinburgh, UK
- Mark Woods (rugby league), New Zealand former professional rugby league footballer
- Mark Kenneth Woods (born 1977), Canadian writer, actor, producer and director

== See also ==
- Marc Woods, British swimmer and Paralympian
- Mark Wood (disambiguation)
