= Woode (surname) =

Woode is a surname. Notable people with the surname include:

- Anthony Woode (born 1923), Ghanaian trade unionist
- Henri Woode (1909–1994), American composer, lyricist, arranger, and singer
- Jimmy Woode (1926–2005), American jazz bassist
- Margo Woode (1928–2018), American actress
- Natasha Woode, fictional character in Spank! The Fifty Shades Parody
- Nectar Woode (born 1999), English soul singer-songwriter and producer

== See also ==
- List of people with surname Wood
