= Jason Wood =

Jason Wood may refer to:

- Jason Wood (baseball) (born 1969), former Major League Baseball player
- Jason Wood (comedian) (1972–2010), British comedian
- Jason Wood (musician), lead singer of metalcore band It Dies Today
- Jason Wood (politician) (born 1968), Australian politician
- Jason Wood (writer), British writer
