= Bernard Wood (paleoanthropologist) =

British paleoanthropologist (b 1945)

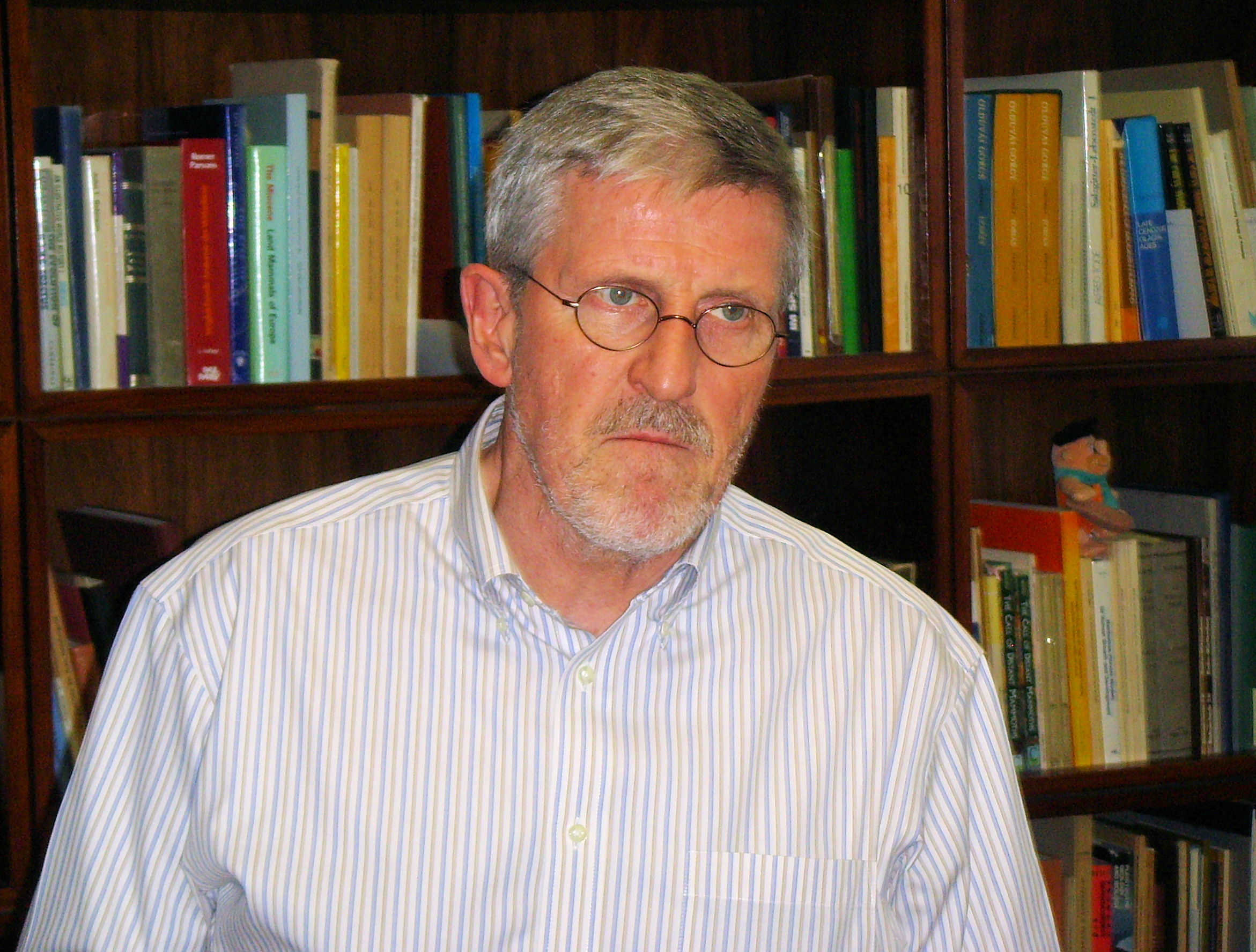
- Wood in 2008
- Born: Bernard Anthony Wood; April 17, 1945 (age 81)
- Education: University of London
- Known for: Hominin systematics; Koobi Fora cranial monograph; proposal of Homo rudolfensis
- Awards: Oscar and Shoshana Trachtenberg Prize for Faculty Scholarship (2003); 175th Anniversary Medal of the Finnish Society of Sciences and Letters (2015); Royal Anthropological Institute President's Lifetime Achievement Award (2023)
- Scientific career
- Fields: Paleoanthropology
- Workplaces: George Washington University; University of Liverpool; University of London
- Thesis: Sexual dimorphism in the skeleton of higher primates (1975)
- Website: anthropology.columbian.gwu.edu/bernard-wood

Bernard Anthony Wood (born 17 April 1945) is a British paleoanthropologist and University Professor of Human Origins at George Washington University. He is known for his work on hominin systematics, including his influential 1991 proposal-based on analysis of cranial remains from the Koobi Fora Research Project - that fossils attributed to Homo habilis represent at least two species: Homo habilis sensu stricto and Homo rudolfensis. His 1991 Koobi Fora monograph is regarded as a key reference in the field.

Wood's research has increasingly focused on comparative anatomy and soft-tissue phylogeny in primates, demonstrating that soft tissues often provide stronger phylogenetic signals than craniodental traits. His collaborations, particularly with Rui Diogo, have produced detailed studies on primate myology, supporting a close relationship between Pan and Homo. He has authored or co-authored over 250 scientific articles and 20 books, with his work cited more than 23,500 times and an h-index of 87 according to Google Scholar (as of January 2026).

== Early life and education ==
Wood enrolled as an undergraduate at the Middlesex Hospital Medical School (part of the University of London) in 1963, intending to become an orthopedic surgeon. He completed an intercalated BSc in anatomy (1966 -1967), taking courses in primatology and human evolution from John Napier and Michael Day. His honors project - a multivariate analysis of the OH 8 talus - became his first publication.

He earned his MBBS in 1970. After brief clinical practice, he lectured in anatomy at the Middlesex and Charing Cross Hospital Medical Schools. He received his PhD from the University of London in 1975 on sexual dimorphism in higher primate skeletons, followed by a DSc in 1996.

== Career ==
In 1972, Wood joined the Koobi Fora Research Project at Richard Leakey's invitation, analyzing hominin cranial fossils alongside Michael Day and Alan Walker. This work directed his research toward craniodental evidence and hominin variation.

At the University of London, he became University Reader in Anatomy (1978) and S.A. Courtauld Professor of Anatomy (1982). In 1985, he moved to the University of Liverpool as Derby Professor of Anatomy and department head, later serving as Dean of the Medical School (1995 -1997).

In 1997, he joined George Washington University as Henry R. Luce Professor of Human Origins, becoming University Professor in 2006 and Director of the Center for the Advanced Study of Human Paleobiology until 2020. He is also an Adjunct Senior Scientist at the Smithsonian's National Museum of Natural History. In 2007, he was elected an Honorary Fellow of the Royal College of Surgeons of England.

Wood has held leadership positions including President of the Primate Society of Great Britain and Ireland (1986 -1989), President of the Anatomical Society of Great Britain and Ireland (1996 -1997), and Vice-President of the Royal Anthropological Institute (1989-1992). Wood was Chair of the Wellcome Trust’s Science-based Archaeology Committee, and a member of the UK’s Natural Environment Research Council and the Science and Engineering Research Council. In 2023, he received the Royal Anthropological Institute's President's Lifetime Achievement Award in recognition of his over fifty years as a leading figure in human origins research, his focus on hominin adaptations and evolution, and his mentorship of numerous PhD students and post-doctoral researchers. He emphasizes collaboration, co-authoring most publications with students, post-docs, and colleagues.

== Research ==
Wood's research centers on hominin systematics: improving species recognition, phylogenetic reconstruction, and distinguishing reliable phylogenetic signals from noise in the fossil record. His 1991 Koobi Fora monograph proposed that Homo habilis fossils likely represent two taxa-Homo habilis sensu stricto and Homo rudolfensis - while variation in Paranthropus boisei fits high sexual dimorphism in one species, and some early African Homo erectus may sample Homo ergaster. This proposal for Homo rudolfensis has influenced ongoing taxonomic debates in paleoanthropology, contributing to discussions about the boundaries and diversity of early Homo.

He has explored cladistic analyses of early hominin phylogeny and the role of homoplasy. Wood advocates reducing ignorance about human evolution rather than seeking definitive answers, preferring to challenge uncritically accepted views. His taxonomic framework for early Homo has influenced subsequent debates in the field.

=== Soft-tissue anatomy and primate phylogeny ===
Post-2000, Wood's work has shifted toward soft tissues, finding they often yield more reliable phylogenetic signals than hard tissues. Collaborating with Mark Collard, Sally Gibbs, and especially Rui Diogo, he has conducted comparative myology studies on primates, including dissections of gorillas, hylobates, chimpanzees, orangutans, and bonobos.

Key findings include support for a (Pan, Homo) clade based on muscle morphology of the head, neck, pectoral region, and upper limbs. Their 2012 monograph synthesizes these analyses, exploring muscle evolution in human bipedalism and tool use. Ongoing projects extend to trunk and lower limb musculature, testing against molecular phylogenies.

Wood's broader interests include dental evolution, evolvability, diet reconstruction via imaging, and epistemology in paleoanthropology.

== Selected publications ==
- Wood, Bernard A. (1991). Koobi Fora Research Project, Volume 4: Hominid Cranial Remains. Oxford: Clarendon Press. ISBN 978-0198575023.
- Wood, B. A. (1992). "Origin and evolution of the genus Homo". Nature. 355 (6363): 783–790. doi:10.1038/355783a0.
- Wood, B.; Collard, M. (1999). "The human genus". Science. 284 (5411): 65–71. doi:10.1126/science.284.5411.65. PMID 10096991.
- Wood, B.; Richmond, B.G. (2000). "Human evolution: taxonomy and paleobiology". Journal of Anatomy. 197 (Pt 1): 19–60. doi:10.1046/j.1469-7580.2000.19710019.x. PMID 10999270.
- Wood, Bernard (2019) [2005]. Human Evolution: A Very Short Introduction (2nd ed.). Oxford: Oxford University Press. doi:10.1093/actrade/9780198831747.001.0001. ISBN 978-0198831747.
- Wood, Bernard (2011). Wood, Bernard (ed.). Wiley-Blackwell Encyclopedia of Human Evolution. Chichester: Wiley-Blackwell. doi:10.1002/9781444342499. ISBN 978-1405155106.
- Diogo, Rui; Wood, Bernard (2012). Comparative Anatomy and Phylogeny of Primate Muscles and Human Evolution. Boca Raton: CRC Press. doi:10.1201/b11605. ISBN 978-1578087679.
- Gibbs, S.; Collard, M.; Wood, B. (2000). "Soft-tissue characters in higher primate phylogenetics". Proceedings of the National Academy of Sciences. 97 (20): 11130–11132. doi:10.1073/pnas.190165497. PMID 10984512.
- Diogo, R.; Wood, B. (2011). "Soft-tissue anatomy of the primates: phylogenetic analyses based on the muscles of the head, neck, pectoral region and upper limb, with notes on the evolution of these muscles". Journal of Anatomy. 219 (3): 273–359. doi:10.1111/j.1469-7580.2011.01403.x. PMID 21689100.
- Wood, B.; Boyle, E. K. (2016). "Hominin taxic diversity: Fact or fantasy?". Yearbook of Physical Anthropology. 159 (S62): 37–78. doi:10.1002/ajpa.22902.
