= Robert Watson Wood =

American clergyman and gay rights activist (1923–2018)

- Undated photo
- Title: Reverend

Personal life
- Born: May 21, 1923 Youngstown, Ohio
- Died: August 19, 2018 (aged 95) Concord, New Hampshire
- Notable work(s): Christ and the Homosexual
- Known for: Early advocacy for gay and lesbian rights in the United States
- Other names: Robert W. Wood, Robert Wood
- Occupation: Minister, LGBT rights activist, author
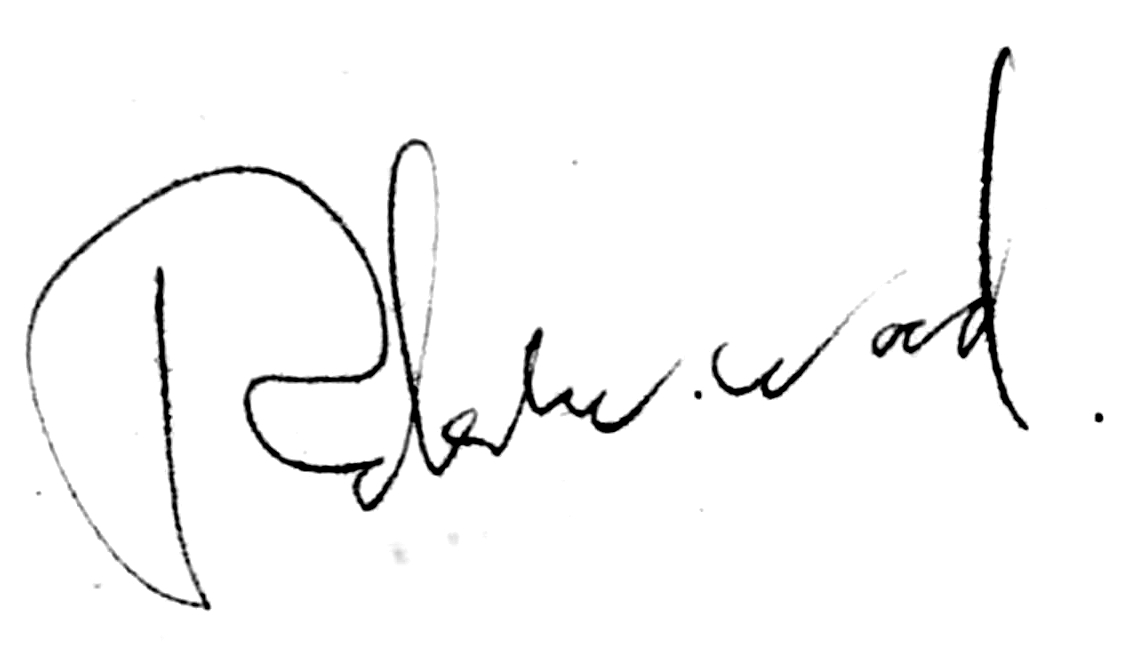
- Signature

Religious life
- Religion: Protestant
- Sect: United Church of Christ
- Ordination: 1951, Congregational Church at Fair Haven, Vermont

Robert Watson Wood (May 21, 1923 – August 19, 2018) was an American clergyman of the United Church of Christ, an early activist for LGBT rights and advocate for the LGBT community both before and after the pivotal Stonewall riots in the United States, and an author.

Wood was born in Youngstown, Ohio, on May 21, 1923. He enrolled at the University of Pennsylvania but left and enlisted in the United States Army to fight in World War II in North Africa and Italy with the 36th Infantry Division. He was severely wounded in battle, receiving the Bronze Star Medal for "heroic achievement in combat" and other military honors, and spent nearly two years medically recovering.

He returned to complete his bachelor's degree at Pennsylvania. There he encountered prejudice against his sexual orientation justified through Christian scripture and resolved to learn scripture and theology himself. He began his pastoral career after graduating from Oberlin Seminary in 1951 and being ordained by the Congregational Church at Fair Haven, Vermont.

He met his husband, Hugh M. Coulter, an artist and cowboy, in 1962. They remained together until Coulter's death in 1989.

In 1960 Wood's book Christ and the Homosexual was published by Vantage Press in New York. Although it was reviewed positively by gay publications and earned him an award from the Mattachine Society, it garnered little public attention at the time and sold approximately 3,000 copies. However, it was used as a reference for academic publications concerning gay culture.

In a long career as a pastor he officiated at many same-sex weddings and continuously advocated in both the Christian world and broader society for the rights and spiritual integrity of LGBT people. He died in Concord, New Hampshire, in 2018.

== Works ==
- Christ and the Homosexual (1960), New York, Vantage Press, pp 221

== Bibliography ==
Law, Steven C. (2026). The Story of Bob: The Life and Times of the Rev. Robert W. Wood. United Church Press. ISBN 9780829829204.
