= List of Sites of Special Scientific Interest in Cumnock and Kyle =

The following is a list of Sites of Special Scientific Interest in the Cumnock and Kyle Area of Search. For other areas, see List of SSSIs by Area of Search.

- Afton Lodge
- Ailsa Craig
- Aldons Hill
- Auchalton
- Ballantrae Shingle Beach
- Barlosh Moss
- Benbeoch
- Bennane Head Grasslands
- Blair Farm
- Blood Moss and Slot Burn
- Bogton Loch
- Byne Hill
- Craig Wood
- Craighead Quarry
- Dalmellington Moss
- Dunaskin Glen
- Dundonald Wood
- Feoch Meadows
- Fountainhead
- Garpel Water
- Girvan to Ballantrae Coast Section
- Glen App and Galloway Moors
- Greenock Mains
- Howford Bridge
- Knockdaw Hill
- Knockdolian Hill
- Knockgardner
- Knockormal
- Laggan Burn
- Littleton and Balhamie Hills
- Loch Doon
- Lugar Sill
- Maidens - Doonfoot
- Martnaham Loch and Wood
- Merrick Kells
- Millenderdale
- Muirkirk Uplands
- Ness Glen
- Nith Bridge
- North Lowther Uplands
- Penwhapple Burn
- Pinbain Burn to Cairn Hill
- River Ayr Gorge
- Roughneuk Quarry
- Sgavoch
- South Threave
- Stairhill
- Troon Golf Links and Foreshore
- Turnberry Dunes
- Turnberry Lighthouse to Port Murray
