= Robert Wood (timber merchant) =

Robert Wood (10 August 1792 – 13 April 1847), was a Canadian timber merchant and shipowner inaccurately alleged to be the son of Prince Edward Augustus and his mistress, Madame de Saint-Laurent.

== Alleged parentage ==
Recent scholarship (particularly by Mollie Gillen, who was granted access to the Royal Archive at Windsor Castle) has established that no children were born of the 27-year relationship between Edward Augustus and Madame de Saint-Laurent; although many Canadian families and individuals (including the Nova Scotian soldier Sir William Fenwick Williams, 1st Baronet) have claimed descent from them, such claims can now be discounted in light of this new research. Based on the absence of birth or baptism records for Wood (with such an absence often considered to be indicative of royal descent), subsequent generations of the Wood family had a tradition that claimed that the infant Wood was given by the Prince to his former servant, Robert Wood senior. Exactly when Robert Wood and his parentage became the subject of such speculation is unclear, but the only source appears to have been the family itself.

== Parentage ==
Wood was in fact the biological son of the aforementioned Robert Wood, who was a servant to the Prince when he went to Quebec in 1791. Robert Wood senior married, in December of that year, Marie Dupuis (also known as Marie Caton). Subsequently appointed doorkeeper of the Executive Council, and later a merchant, he died in 1806, survived by seven children, Robert junior being the eldest.

== Career ==
By 1812, Wood was commissioned culler of timber, and by 1815 master culler and measurer of masts and timber. He and his brother George started their own business as timber merchants and carpenters; the business flourished and floundered on the vicissitudes of the timber market, and Wood was bankrupted in 1826, only to recover (building a large house at Anse St Michel, Sillery) by 1829.

== Death ==
At some time around the end of 1846 or early 1847, Wood visited the West Indies to benefit his health; this failed to do any good, and he died in April of that year. Place of death has been noted as Savannah, Georgia. He was survived by his wife, Charlotte (née Gray), daughter of a military clerk, whom he had married in 1817 and with whom he had eleven children.
