= Qualeasha Wood =

American artist (born 1996)

- Born: 1996 (age 29–30); Long Branch, New Jersey, United States
- Education: Rhode Island School of Design (BFA); Cranbrook Academy of Art (MFA)
- Website: qualeasha.com

Qualeasha Wood (born 1996) is an American textile artist. Her work often deals with representation of African-American women in internet culture.

== Early life and education ==
Wood was born and raised in Long Branch, New Jersey. She received her Bachelor of Fine Arts in printmaking at the Rhode Island School of Design in 2019 and her Master of Fine Arts in photography at the Cranbrook Academy of Art in 2021. She entered college as an illustrator before turning to textiles and printmaking, partly inspired by meeting Faith Ringgold.

== Career ==
Wood's self-portrait tapestry The [Black] Madonna/Whore Complex appeared on the cover of Art in America magazine in May/June 2021. It was acquired by the Metropolitan Museum of Art for the exhibition Alter Egos | Projected Selves starting in November 2021. It then became part of the museum's permanent collection in April 2022, making Wood one of the youngest artists to have work acquired by the Met at 25 years old.

Wood's first solo exhibition in Europe, TL:DR, opened in London in May 2023. Her tapestry Genesis, bought by Swizz Beatz in 2021, went on display in the Dean Collection at the Brooklyn Museum beginning in February 2024.
