= Walter Wood (Scouting) =

Canadian Scout

- Born: 1876; England, UK
- Died: 31 March 1981 (aged 104); Kentville, Nova Scotia, Canada
- Occupation: Machinist

Walter Richard Wood, CM (1876 – 31 March 1981) was a Canadian active in the Boy Scouts.

== Biography ==
Born in England, the son of Richard Leonard Wood and Martha Glover, he came to Canada in 1920 and worked as a machinist with the Dominion Atlantic Railway. Wood was a lifelong member of the Boy Scouts and was still regularly attending meetings until the age of 101 and is still known as the oldest Boy Scout in the Commonwealth of Nations.

In 1978, Wood was honored by being appointed as a Member to the Order of Canada for his lifetime of community service both in the Scouts and out. Also, Walter was invited and attended dinner with Queen Elizabeth II of Canada and had met Robert Baden-Powell, founder of the Boy Scouts.

The town of Kentville also bestowed upon Walter the Key to the Town of Kentville and named a public park area after him.

He died in Kentville, Nova Scotia in 1981 of natural causes.
