= Mary Inez Wood =

American suffragist (1866–1945)

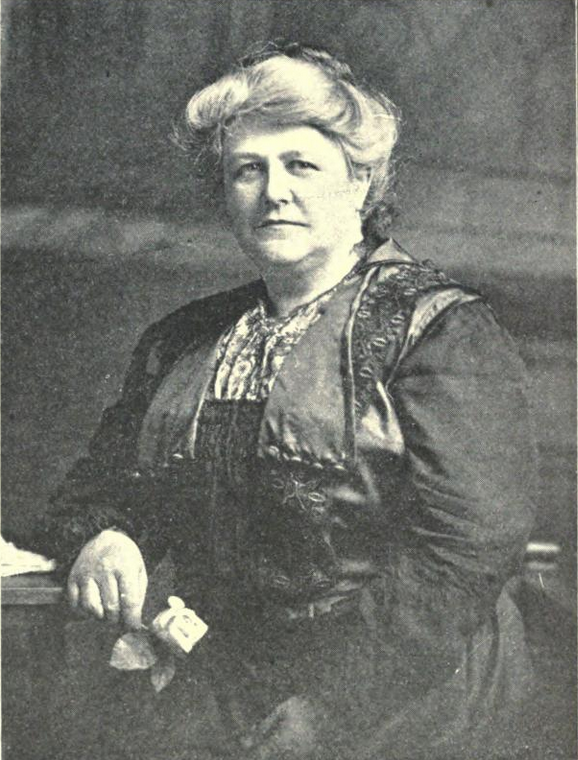
- Born: Mary Inez Stevens; January 18, 1866; Woodstock, Vermont
- Died: April 24, 1945 (aged 79); Portsmouth, New Hampshire, US
- Occupations: American writer, activist
- Known for: Contributions to the women's rights movement
- Spouse: George Albert Wood
- Children: Helen M. Wood, Albert James Wood, Mary Elizabeth Wood, Keith Ainsworth Wood

Mary Inez Wood (January 1, 1866 - 24 April 1945) was an American writer and leader in women's rights during the 20th century. She served in various important positions, such as the first president of the New Hampshire League of Women Voters and the Manager of Bureau of Information for the General Federation of Women's Clubs. Additionally, she was the author of the History of the General Federation of Women's Clubs. Wood was described as "one of the most loved and respected women of New Hampshire" according to the Woman Citizen.

== Biography ==
Wood was born on January 18, 1866, in Woodstock, Vermont, as Mary Inez Stevens. Her parents were John L. Stevens and Jean Ainsworth (Brand) Stevens. Wood married George Albert Wood, son of James A. and Mary E. (Bowers) Wood on October 14, 1884, in Acworth, New Hampshire. She resided in West Lebanon, New Hampshire, until 1889, when she moved to West Medford, Massachusetts. Finally, she moved to Portsmouth, New Hampshire, in 1898. The lives of her five children are recorded by the archives of the Portsmouth Athenaeum. Her first daughter was Helen M. Wood, born in 1886, and who married Gordon M. Campbell, the son of Robert S. Campbell and Margaret Gordon. Her first son was Albert James Wood, born in 1887 and married in 1914 to Edna Louise Wildner. Her second daughter was Mary Elizabeth Wood, born in 1888 in West Lebanon, NH, and married on June 29, 1915, in Portsmouth, New Hampshire to Robert Lawrence Lamont, son of Benjamin Lamont and Laura Worth. Her second son was Keith Ainsworth Wood, born in 1890. She had a fifth child but there are no records on the name or birth date, indicating that the child may have died young.

Wood was considered the best spokesperson and advocate for woman suffrage in New Hampshire. Described on pages 402-10 of the History of Woman Suffrage Vol. VI 1900-1920, in January 1919, Wood testified three times before New Hampshire Congress in service to woman suffrage. Then, on September 10, 1919, Wood was the only speaker on behalf of the suffrage movement before the New Hampshire Senate as it voted to ratify the 19th Amendment, and she was successful. Previously, in 1913, Wood had been involved in more legislative action in favor of the Bills for Municipal suffrage. Wood, along with other suffragists, presented a petition with 1,000 signatures to the large crowd present for the hearing. Unfortunately, they were unsuccessful.

Wood was well known in New Hampshire for her service in various fields, especially for her work within the woman suffrage movement. Some of her most prominent positions were serving as the Vice President of New Hampshire Woman Suffrage Association, where she gave speeches in the New Hampshire Government; the President of the New Hampshire Federation of Women's Clubs; and the Manager of the Bureau of Information of the General Federation of Women's Clubs, where she participated in various charitable and civic associations, covering a wide range of issues

According to the One Thousand New Hampshire Notables Wood held many positions:

- Served on board of education of Medford Woman’s Club
- Auditor and chairman education committee
- President of local Consumers’ League
- Director at MA Consumers' League
- Member and president of Graffort (Women’s) Club in Portsmouth
- President Civic Assistant
- President of District Nursing Association in Portsmouth
- President of Woman’s Realty Company
- Vice-President of Portsmouth Charity Organization
- President of Women's Alliance of the Unitarian Church
- Superintendent of a Sunday School
- Member of the Portsmouth Board of Instruction
- Member and Vice President of NH Woman Suffrage Association
- President of NH Federation of Women’s Clubs
- Secretary for the General Federation of Women’s Clubs
- Manager of Bureau of Information of the General Federation of Women’s Clubs
- Member of NH state board of Charities and Corrections
- Chairman NH Division of Woman’s Committee on the National Council of Defense
- Director of Home Economics for NH under the Federal Food Administration

In 1919, Wood created and headed the School for Citizenship at New Hampshire College (NHC), now the University of New Hampshire. Wood acted as the Parliamentarian at the School for Citizenship at NHC and opened the first session with a speech championing the cause of the school and the unique viewpoints and talents of women. By all accounts, she was an even-tempered and motherly presence, keeping the school on track and calming all participants when political debates became too heated.

Wood died on 24 April 1945 in Portsmouth, New Hampshire. She is buried in Harmony Grove Cemetery on South Street in Portsmouth, New Hampshire.

== Publications ==
The History of the General Federation of Women’s Clubs for the First Twenty-Two Years of its Organization (New York, 1919)

== See also ==
- List of suffragists and suffragettes
