= Arthur Wood =

Arthur Wood may refer to:

- Arthur Wood (composer) (1875–1953), English composer
- Arthur Wood (cricketer, born 1844) (1844–1933), English cricketer who played for Hampshire
- Arthur Wood (American cricketer) (1861–1947), American cricketer
- Arthur Wood (cricketer, born 1898) (1898–1973), English Test cricketer
- Arthur Wood (cricketer, born 1892) (1892–1951), English cricketer
- Arthur Wood (footballer, born 1890) (1890–1977), English football forward with Gillingham, Fulham and Queens Park Rangers
- Arthur Wood (footballer, born 1894) (1894–1941), English football goalkeeper with Southampton and Clapton Orient
- Arthur Wood (rugby league) (1926–2002), rugby league footballer of the 1950s for England, Featherstone Rovers, and Leeds
- Arthur Wood (sailor) (1875–1939), Olympic sailor (1908)
- Arthur Wood (Royal Navy officer) (1875–1961), English cricketer and Royal Navy officer
- Arthur O'Hara Wood (1890–1918), Australian tennis player
- Art Wood (1937–2006), British rock singer, graphic artist
- Arthur M. Wood, president of Sears Roebuck, 1968–1973
- Arthur Wood, keyboardist in the Climax Blues Band
