= Scott Wood (American football) =

American football player (born 1968)

No. 13
- Position: Quarterback

Personal information
- Born: December 31, 1968 (age 57)
- Listed height: 6 ft 3 in (1.91 m)
- Listed weight: 215 lb (98 kg)

Career information
- College: Saint Mary's (CA)

Career history
- San Jose SaberCats (1995–1997); San Jose SaberCats (1999–2000); San Jose SaberCats (2002); San Jose SaberCats (2004)*
- * Offseason or practice squad member only

Career AFL statistics
- Comp. / Att.: 368 / 678
- Passing yards: 4,782
- TD–INT: 72–23
- QB rating: 89.12
- Rushing TDs: 6
- Stats at ArenaFan.com

Scott Wood (born December 31, 1968) is an American former professional football quarterback who played five seasons with the San Jose SaberCats of the Arena Football League (AFL). He played college football at Saint Mary's College of California.

== Early life ==
Scott Wood was born on December 31, 1968. He played college football at Saint Mary's College of California.

== Professional career ==
Wood first played for the AFL's San Jose SaberCats from 1995 to 1997. He briefly retired from football in 1998. He returned to the SaberCats in 1999, starting 13 games and recording 45 touchdown passes. Wood also set team single-season records with 422 pass attempts, 235 completions and 3,069 yards. He played for the team till 2000. He signed with the SaberCats on July 18, 2002, returning to serve as John Dutton's backup. Wood was later signed to the team's practice squad on April 30, 2004, and released by the SaberCats on June 30, 2004.

=== AFL statistics ===
Year	Team	Passing							Rushing		
Year	Team	Cmp	Att	Pct	Yds	TD	Int	Rtg	Att	Yds	TD
1995	San Jose	2	5	40.0	34	0	1	24.17	1	-4	0
1996	San Jose	15	26	57.7	117	2	0	88.14	1	9	1
1997	San Jose	106	208	51.0	1,442	22	6	87.86	10	13	1
1999	San Jose	235	422	55.7	3,069	45	15	90.64	21	26	4
2000	San Jose	10	17	58.8	120	3	1	95.59	0	0	0
Career		368	678	54.3	4,782	72	23	89.12	33	44	6

== Personal life ==
Scott currently teaches at College Park High School in Pleasant Hill, California.
