= Mark Wood =

Mark Wood may refer to:

- Sir Mark Wood, 1st Baronet (1750–1829), British Member of Parliament for Newark, Milborne Port and Gatton
- Mark Wood (bishop) (1919–2014), Bishop of Matabeleland and Bishop of Ludlow
- Mark Wood (businessman) (born 1953), British businessman
- Mark Wood (cricketer) (born 1990), English cricketer
- Mark Wood (explorer) (born 1966), British Arctic and Antarctic explorer
- Mark Wood (footballer) (born 1972), English professional footballer
- Mark Wood (Medal of Honor) (1839–1866), American Civil War Medal of Honor recipient
- Mark Wood (violinist), electric violinist and former string master of the Trans-Siberian Orchestra

== See also ==
- Mark Woods (disambiguation)
- Markwood, West Virginia
