= Graeme Wood =

Graeme Wood may refer to:

- Graeme Wood (businessman) (born 1947), Australian entrepreneur and environmentalist
- Graeme Wood (cricketer) (born 1956), Australian former cricketer
- Graeme Wood (journalist) (born 1979), American journalist and academic

== See also ==
- Graham Wood (disambiguation)
