= Basil Wood =

English footballer

Personal information
- Full name: William Basil Wood
- Date of birth: 13 August 1898
- Place of birth: Waterhouses, Durham, England
- Date of death: 1971 (aged 72–73)
- Position: Winger

Senior career*
Years	Team	Apps	(Gls)
1919–1920	Crook Town		
1920–1922	Leeds United	56	(2)
1922–1923	The Wednesday	0	(0)
Total		56	(2)
- * Club domestic league appearances and goals

Basil Wood (13 August 1898 – 1971) was an English footballer who played in the Football League for Leeds United.

== Research ==
The 1921 census for 2 Temperance Terrace, Ushaw Moor, Durham shows that William Basil Wood was a Professional Footballer for Leeds United A F C Ltd. He is aged 22 years and 10 months and is living with his wife, Lavinia Wood, at the home of her father (Richard Hope). William Basil Wood is shown as having been born in Waterhouses, Durham.

[Waterhouses is a small colliery village that is a little over 3 miles from Ushaw Moor. It is about 4 miles from Crook, where Wood played for the local team before moving to Leeds.]

Working backwards from the information in the 1921 census, the marriage of Lavinia Hope and William B Wood was registered in Lanchester, Durham, England in the first quarter of 1920 (Page 651, Volume 10A).

There is a rather damaged army enlistment record from 22 June 1916 for a William Basil Wood, aged 17 years and 10 months, who is the son of Richard Wood of 5 North Terrace Waterhouses, Durham.

The 1911 census has a 12 year old William Basil Wood who is a scholar living with his parents (Richard and Thomasine) and his older brother in a 2-room house at 11 Dale Street, Waterhouses, Durham. It shows that he was born in Waterhouses, Durham. His father is a coal hewer.

The 1901 census places a 2 year old Wm. B. Wood with his parents (Richd. and Thomasine) and his older brother at 11 Dale Street, Waterhouses, Durham. It confirms that he was born in Waterhouses, Durham.

A male child called William Basil Wood, son of Richard and Thomasin Wood was baptised on 8 September 1898 in Brancepeth, Durham, England (FHL Film Number: 1519881, Reference ID: item 13). Brancepeth is about 4 miles south-east of Waterhouses.

The birth of William Basil Wood was registered in Durham in the third quarter of 1898 (GRO indexes, Volume: 10a, Page: 420).

Working forwards from the information in the 1921 census, the next record found is also related to 2 Temperance Terrace. A legal document of 17 July 1934 mentions "Lavinia Wood of Doncaster, Yorkshire, West Riding, wife of Basil Wood, miner". This makes a link between 2 Temperance Terrace and Doncaster. It also confirms that Lavinia's husband used his middle name of Basil, rather than his first name of William. It is the first indication that her husband has taken employment in the mining industry.

There is a William B Wood in the 1939 England and Wales Register. He was born on 13 Aug 1898. He is married and is living with Lavinia Wood and two others at 62 King Edward Road, Thorne, in the West Riding of Yorkshire. He is employed as a coal hewer.

An entry in the GRO indexes (Volume: 2b, Page: 1353) records the death of a 73 year old William Basil Wood in the last quarter of 1971. He was born on 13 Aug 1898. His death was registered in the Don Valley in the West Riding of Yorkshire.
