= Roger Wood (engineer) =

British-born electrical engineer

- Born: March 12, 1951 (age 75); Bradford, Yorkshire, UK
- Education: UCL (B.Sc.), UBC, (Ph.D)
- Occupation: Engineer
- Employer(s): BT, Ampex, IBM, Hitachi, WD
- Known for: Magnetic Recording Technology, HDD
- Awards: IEEE Magnetics Society Distinguished Lecturer, 1994; IEEE Fellow, 2000; IEEE Magnetics Society Achievement Award, 2009

Roger Wood (born March 12, 1951) is a British electrical engineer and IEEE Fellow whose research has focused on magnetic recording. His work includes contributions to partial-response maximum-likelihood (PRML), perpendicular magnetic recording (PMR), and two-dimensional magnetic recording (TDMR). In 1994, he was selected as an IEEE Magnetics Society Distinguished Lecturer, and in 2009 he received the IEEE Magnetics Society Achievement Award.

== Education ==
He grew up in Bradford, Yorkshire, UK. In 1972, he received a B.Sc. degree in electrical engineering from University College, London. In 1975 he moved to the University of British Columbia for his Ph.D. which involved recording satellite data onto a tape recorder.

== Career ==
Wood joined Ampex Corporation in 1979, applying digital signal processing techniques to magnetic recording. In 1986, Wood transitioned to IBM, later joining the IBM Almaden Research Center to work on advanced magnetic recording technologies. After the sale of IBM's HDD division, Wood joined Hitachi Global Storage Technologies (HGST) in 2003. He subsequently spent 18 months in Japan working on perpendicular recording and served as lead engineer for HGST's advanced HDD development efforts. Following Western Digital's acquisition of Hitachi's HDD business, Wood transitioned to Western Digital in 2012, where he remained until his retirement in 2017.

== Research contributions ==
Wood's research has covered magnetic recording from recording-channel signal processing to recording technologies and system-level recording architecture. His work has included PRML signal processing, perpendicular magnetic recording, areal-density scaling, and two-dimensional magnetic recording.

== Awards and recognition ==
- IEEE Magnetics Society Distinguished Lecturer (1994)
- IEEE Fellow (2000)
- IEEE Magnetics Society Achievement Award (2009)
