= Ron Wood (Australian footballer) =

Australian rules footballer

Personal information
- Full name: Ronald James William Wood
- Born: 29 May 1923; Red Cliffs, Victoria
- Died: 13 December 1978 (aged 55); Heidelberg, Victoria
- Original team: Geelong West
- Height: 174 cm (5 ft 9 in)
- Weight: 70 kg (154 lb)

Playing career^{1}
Years	Club	Games (Goals)
1947–48	Geelong	16 (2)
- ^{1} Playing statistics correct to the end of 1948.

Ronald James William Wood (29 May 1923 – 13 December 1978) was an Australian rules footballer who played with Geelong in the Victorian Football League (VFL).
