= Graham Wood =

Graham Wood may refer to:

- Graham Wood (musician) (1971–2017), Australian jazz pianist
- Graham Wood (field hockey) (born 1936), Australian former field hockey player
- Graham Charles Wood (1934–2016), British corrosion scientist

== See also ==
- Graeme Wood (disambiguation)
