= Douglas E. Wood =

American thoracic surgeon and academic

- Education: Harvard University (A.B., M.D.)
- Known for: Leadership in lung cancer screening guidelines; thoracic surgical oncology
- Awards: Society of Thoracic Surgeons Distinguished Service Award (2019); NCCN Rodger Winn Award (2023)
- Scientific career
- Fields: Thoracic surgery; thoracic oncology; lung cancer screening
- Workplaces: University of Washington School of Medicine

Douglas E. Wood is an American thoracic surgeon and academic. He is the Henry N. Harkins Professor and Chair of the Department of Surgery at the University of Washington School of Medicine. Wood is recognized for his leadership in lung cancer screening guideline development via the National Comprehensive Cancer Network, as well as contributions to surgical oncology, health policy, education, and equity initiatives.

== Early life and education ==
A first generation college graduate, Wood was raised on a family farm near Otsego, Michigan. He earned a B.A. in biology from Harvard College in 1979 and an M.D. from Harvard Medical School in 1983. He completed residencies in general and cardiothoracic surgery at Massachusetts General Hospital and spent a year as a surgical registrar at Royal North Shore Hospital in Sydney, Australia.

== Career ==
In 1991, Wood joined the University of Washington to establish its Section of General Thoracic Surgery and initiate the lung transplant program, becoming a full professor in 2002 and Chair of Surgery in 2015. He holds the Henry N. Harkins Endowed Chair and specializes in surgery for lung and esophageal cancers, complex airway reconstruction, and lung volume reduction for emphysema.

== Lung cancer screening ==
Since 2009, Wood has chaired the NCCN Lung Cancer Screening Panel, leading to the publication of the first lung cancer screening guidelines in 2011 recommending low-dose CT screening for high-risk individuals. These guidelines expanded eligibility to include individuals with additional risk factors, influencing subsequent CMS and U.S. Preventive Services Task Force policy changes. He is credited with helping secure Medicare coverage for screening in 2015. In 2023, Wood became the first cardiothoracic surgeon to receive the NCCN Rodger Winn Award for his contributions to guideline development.

== Professional leadership ==
Wood served as President of the Society of Thoracic Surgeons (2013–14), the Western Thoracic Surgical Association, and the Seattle Surgical Society. He has also been President of the Thoracic Surgery Foundation, President of CTSNet, Director of the American Board of Thoracic Surgery, and Chair of the ACGME Thoracic Surgery Residency Review Committee. In 2019, he received the STS Distinguished Service Award.

== Diversity and equity initiatives ==
As STS President, Wood delivered a presidential address calling for increased gender diversity and collaborative leadership in cardiothoracic surgery. At UW, he initiated a project to display “I Look Like A Surgeon” portraits, showcasing surgeons of diverse backgrounds to replace traditional portraits dominated by white men. He has also published on male allyship in surgery.

== Selected publications ==
- Wood, Douglas E. (2022). "NCCN Guidelines® Insights: Lung Cancer Screening, Version 1.2022". J Natl Compr Canc Netw. 20 (7): 754–764. doi:10.6004/jnccn.2022.0037. PMID 35778153.
- Vesselle, Henry; Pugsley, John M.; Vallières, Eric; Wood, Douglas E. (2002). "FDG-PET improves surgical staging of non-small cell lung cancer". J Thorac Cardiovasc Surg. 124 (3): 511–519. doi:10.1097/00008483-200207000-00010. PMID 12202848.
- Wood, Douglas E. (2014). "Take It to the Limit". Ann Thorac Surg. 98 (5): 1893–1901. doi:10.1016/j.athoracsur.2014.08.052. PMID 25443027.
- Wood, Douglas E. (2021). "How can men be good allies for women in surgery? #HeForShe". Journal of Thoracic Disease. 13 (1): 492–501. doi:10.21037/jtd-2020-wts-11. PMC 7867856. PMID 33569237.
