= Elizabeth Wood (housing director) =

American executive

- Born: Elizabeth Wood; April 9, 1899; Nara, Japan
- Died: January 16, 1993 (aged 93); Atlanta, Georgia, U.S.
- Education: Illinois Wesleyan University; University of Michigan; University of Chicago
- Occupations: Educator; Chicago Housing Authority Director (1937–54)

Elizabeth Wood (April 9, 1899 – January 16, 1993) was the first Executive Director of the Chicago Housing Authority from 1937 until 1954.

Born to missionary parents in Japan, Elizabeth Wood was educated at Illinois Wesleyan University and at the University of Michigan where she received both bachelor's and master's degrees in rhetoric. In 1928, after teaching English at Vassar College for four years, Wood moved to Chicago and found a job with the Home Modernizing Bureau, a trade organization. This organization collapsed with the stock market, however, and soon after Wood began her career as a housing advocate and planner. Wood first worked for the United Charities (now Family Service Bureau) as a caseworker, while also taking courses at the University of Chicago's School of Social Service Administration. Beginning in 1934, Wood was appointed as the Executive Director of Metropolitan Housing Council. During this time she also served on the Illinois State Housing Board.

== Chicago Housing Authority ==
In 1937, Wood assumed the position of Executive Director for the nascent Chicago Housing Authority, working to structure city management of three housing projects built by the Federal Public Works Administration, including the Jane Addams, Julia C. Lathrop and Trumbull Park Homes. Through her productive partnership with Mayor Edward Kelly, Wood is credited with running an agency free of corruption and tirelessly pursuing a goal of providing high-quality, racially integrated housing. Wood weathered several race riots at newly integrated housing sites, first in the Southwest side Airport Homes in 1946, the Southside Fernwood Homes in 1947, and Park Manor in 1949. An advocate of low-rise projects scattered throughout the city, Wood worked closely with the Parks Department to assure tenants adequate recreation space and advocated for the construction of community and cultural facilities with housing.

After Mayor Kelly left office, and following years of often violent battles with city council members who wished to limit new public housing construction to black neighborhoods, Wood resigned from the CHA in 1954. Wood later worked for the City Housing Authority and the Citizens Housing and Planning Council in New York City and from 1965 to 1972 she served as an advisor at the Department of Housing and Urban Development under the Johnson and Nixon Administrations.

== Legacy ==
Elizabeth Wood Park in Chicago was named in 2004 as a testament to Wood's dedication to the city.
