= Dougie Wood =

Scottish footballer and manager (1940–2022)

Personal information
- Date of birth: 15 February 1940
- Place of birth: Musselburgh, Scotland
- Date of death: 3 June 2022 (aged 82)
- Place of death: Derry, Northern Ireland
- Position: Left half

Senior career*
Years	Team	Apps	(Gls)
1957–1960	Sunderland	0	(0)
1960–1961	Raith Rovers	1	(0)
1961–1967	Derry City	?	(3)
1967	→ Boston Rovers (loan)	?	(0)
1967–1968	Linfield	?	(?)
1968–1972	Derry City	?	(?)
1972–1973	Athlone Town	31	(0)
1973–1974	Shamrock Rovers	12	(0)
1974–1975	Athlone Town	29	(4)
1975–1976	Sligo Rovers	13	(0)
1977–1978	Shelbourne	15	(1)

Managerial career
- 1971–1972: Derry City (player-manager)
- 1973–1974: Shamrock Rovers
- * Club domestic league appearances and goals

Dougie Wood (15 February 1940 – 3 June 2022) is a Scottish former footballer, who played for eleven seasons with Derry City from 1961 to 1972 in the Irish League. He won six inter-league caps for the Irish League between 1964 and 1967, and won the Irish Cup in 1963/64, the Irish League championship and the Gold Cup in 1964/65. He was the Ulster Footballer of the Year for the 1964/65 season. He also managed the club as player-manager between July 1971 and July 1972.

== Early life ==
He attended Musselburgh Grammar School.

== Career ==
Wood represented the Boston Rovers in the summer of 1967.

After Shay Keogh resigned as Shamrock Rovers manager in December 1973, Wood (along with Shay Noonan and Dick Giles) took over team affairs for the rest of the 1973/74 season.

Dougie died peacefully at home, aged 82, on 3 June 2022.
