= Elisabeth Jean Wood =

American political scientist

- Education: Cornell University; University of Oxford; University of California, Berkeley; Stanford University
- Awards: Luebbert Award, APSA; Fellow, AAAS; Yale Graduate Mentor Award
- Scientific career
- Fields: Political science; International studies; Area studies
- Workplaces: Yale University; Santa Fe Institute; New York University

Elisabeth Jean Wood is an American political scientist, currently the Franklin Muzzy Crosby Professor of the Human Environment, professor of political science, and professor of international and area studies at Yale University. She studies sexual violence during war, the emergence of political insurgencies and individuals' participation in them, and democratization, with a focus on Latin American politics and African politics.

== Education and early career ==
Wood received a BA in physics from Cornell University in 1979, and then another BA in philosophy and mathematics from the University of Oxford in 1981. She then received a MA in physics at the University of California, Berkeley, followed by an MA in Latin American Studies in 1988, also from UC Berkeley. She completed her education in 1995, receiving a PhD in political science from Stanford University.

Upon completing her PhD, Wood became a professor in the department of politics at New York University. She remained a professor in that department until 2004, when she moved to Yale University. During this time she also began a professorship at the Santa Fe Institute in 2002 which she held until 2010. From 2010 to 2017, she was a member of the external faculty at the Santa Fe Institute.

== Career ==
In 2000, Wood published her first book, Forging Democracy from Below: Insurgent Transitions in South Africa and El Salvador. In this book, Wood uses micro-level ethnographic data obtained from fieldwork in the two cases of El Salvador and South Africa to argue that the process of democratization can be prompted by alliances of workers and impoverished people who confront established elites. In Forcing Democracy from Below, Wood studies the conditions in which this sort of democratization process can be successful.

Wood's second book, Insurgent Collective Action and Civil War in El Salvador, was published in 2003. Wood studies the cooperation of rural people and agricultural cooperatives with a political insurgency in El Salvador, arguing that many individuals overcame the collective action problem to participate in a dangerous insurgency because of a combination of beliefs that the insurgency would have positive effects, a desire to express defiance, and the pleasure of expressing individual agency. In reviewing the book, Jon Shefner noted that the field sites that Wood spent time in to research the book were particularly challenging and dangerous, and that she documented her findings with noteworthy methodological precision.

Wood has been a co-editor of two other books: the 2010 volume Political Representation, and the 2012 volume Understanding and Proving International Sex Crimes. In addition to publications in journals like Politics and Society, The Journal of Peace Research, and Comparative Political Studies on topics like democratization in El Salvador, sexual assault in the military, and sexual violence by armed forces, she has authored a number of public policy pieces in the popular media. These include pieces in The Washington Post, The New York Times, and Al Jazeera.

Wood is a member of the 2020-2024 editorial leadership of the American Political Science Review, which is the most selective political science journal. She was previously a member of the editorial boards of the American Political Science Review from 2007 to 2013, as well as of World Politics, Politics and Society, and the Contentious Politics Series of the Cambridge University Press. She has also served on the American Political Science Association's Committee on Human Subjects Research.

In 2010, Wood was named a Fellow of the American Academy of Arts and Sciences, and in 2018 she was named the Franklin Muzzy Crosby Professor of the Human Environment at Yale University.

== Selected works ==
- Forging Democracy from Below: Insurgent Transitions in South Africa and El Salvador. (2000)
- Insurgent Collective Action and Civil War in El Salvador. (2003)
- "The social processes of civil war: The wartime transformation of social networks". Annual Review of Political Science. (2008)

== Selected awards ==
- 2005 Luebbert Award for the Best Book in Comparative Politics, APSA Comparative Politics Section
- 2010 Fellow, American Academy of Arts and Sciences
- 2013 Graduate Mentor Award for the Social Sciences at Yale University
