= Paul Hamilton Wood =

Paul Hamilton Wood (16 August 1907 – 13 July 1962) was an Australian cardiologist, defence forces personnel and physician. Wood was born in Coonoor, Tamil Nadu, India and died in London, England.
