= Susan Wood (poet) =

American poet (born 1946)

- Born: 1946 (age 79–80); Commerce, Texas, U.S.
- Education: East Texas State University (B.A.); University of Texas at Arlington (M.A.); Rice University
- Occupations: Poet; professor

Susan Wood (born 1946, Commerce, Texas) is an American poet and the Gladys Louise Fox Professor of English at Rice University.

== Life ==
Wood received her B.A. from East Texas State University and her M.A. from University of Texas at Arlington before continuing her graduate studies at Rice University.

She taught high school and worked as an editor and writer for The Washington Post and magazines.

Her poems have appeared in such journals as The Antioch Review, Callaloo, the Greensboro Review, Indiana Review, The Kenyon Review, The Missouri Review, the New England Review, The Paris Review, and Poetry.

== Awards ==
- 1991 Lamont Poetry Prize for Campo Santo
- Pushcart Prize for her poem "Diary"
- 1998 Guggenheim Fellowship for poetry

== Works ==
- "Eggs". Poetry. September 1986.
- "In America". Virginia Quarterly Review: 133–134. Summer 2006. Archived from the original on 2009-05-28.
- "Analysis of the Rose as Sentimental Despair". Ploughshares. Spring 1999. Archived from the original on August 21, 2007.
- "Pink Vista". Ploughshares. Spring 1981. Archived from the original on November 6, 2005.
- "Fourth of July, Texas, 1956". Ploughshares. Spring 1981. Archived from the original on November 1, 2005.
- "Tenderness". SmartishPace (4).

=== Poetry books ===
- the book of ten. University of Pittsburgh Press. 2011. ISBN 978-0-8229-6139-0.
- Asunder. Penguin. 2001. ISBN 978-0-14-042434-8.
- Campo Santo. Louisiana State University Press. 1991. ISBN 978-0-8071-1677-7.
- Bazaar. Holt, Rinehart and Winston. 1981. ISBN 978-0-03-057856-4.
