= Susan F. Wood =

American public health professional

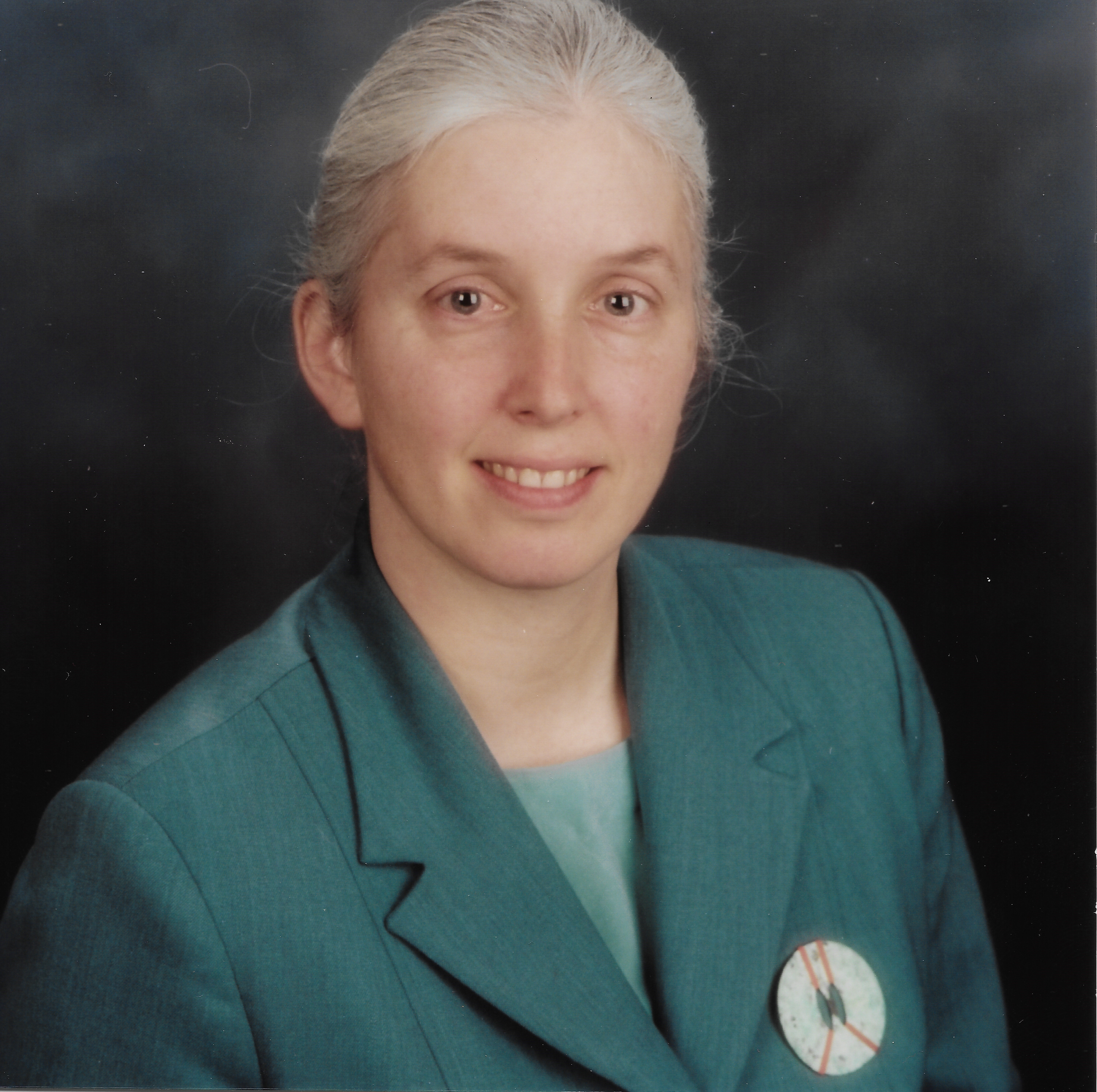
- Born: November 5, 1958; Jacksonville, Florida, U.S.
- Died: January 17, 2025 (aged 66); London, England
- Education: Southwestern at Memphis (BS); Boston University (PhD)
- Occupations: Public health professional; academic
- Spouse: Richard Payne
- Children: 1

Susan Franklin Wood (November 5, 1958 – January 17, 2025) was an American public health professional. She worked for the Food and Drug Administration from 2000 until 2005, when she resigned as a protest against the agency's delays in approving the morning-after pill for use without a prescription. She later served as director of the Jacobs Institute of Women's Health at the Milken Institute School of Public Health.

== Background ==
Wood, a native of Jacksonville, Florida, was born on November 5, 1958. Her father was a surgeon. Wood graduated from Southwestern at Memphis in 1980, where she studied psychobiology, and earned her PhD in biology from Boston University in 1989, through the university's Marine Program at the Marine Biological Laboratory. She was a researcher at Johns Hopkins University School of Medicine.

== Career ==
From 1990 to 1995, Wood was science advisor to the Congressional Caucus for Women's Issues. There, she helped draft the National Institutes of Health Revitalization Act of 1993, a law that required the inclusion of women and minorities in NIH research.

She then joined the United States Department of Health and Human Services, in the Office on Women's Health, where she served as Deputy Director and worked on the team that created the National Centers of Excellence in Women’s Health.

From 2000 to 2005, Wood was Assistant Commissioner for Women's Health of the Food and Drug Administration. She resigned over delays in approving the over-the-counter us of the morning-after pill. While an advisory panel had unanimously endorsed a move to make the pill available without a prescription, the final approval was subject to considerable delay, a decision she attributed to political pressure from social conservative influences. In an email to her colleagues, she said that "scientific and clinical evidence, fully evaluated and recommended for approval by the professional staff here, has been overruled". Wood travelled extensively across the nation afterwards, explaining to the public in media interviews, lectures, and newspaper editorial board meetings the need for transparency and scientific integrity within government as well as advocating that emergency contraception be made available over the counter to women of all ages. The FDA finally approved full non-prescription use of the emergency contraception pill in 2013.

After leaving the FDA, Wood became a professor at George Washington University. She contributed to research across a broad range of areas, including strategies for healthy weight maintenance in lesbian and bisexual women, heart disease, and adolescent behavior. She continued until 2022 to teach a course she developed in Women’s Health.

== Personal life and death ==
Wood and her husband, Richard Payne, had a daughter. In 2017, they moved to Scotland, living in Tobermory on the Isle of Mull. After Wood’s diagnosis with brain cancer in January 2023, the family divided their time between residences in London and Tobermory. Professor Wood died from glioblastoma in London on January 17, 2025, at the age of 66.

== Works ==
- Wood, Susan F. (April 1, 2014). "Inappropriate Obstructions to Access: The FDA's Handling of Plan B". AMA Journal of Ethics. 16 (4). American Medical Association: 295–301. doi:10.1001/virtualmentor.2014.16.4.oped1-1404. ISSN 2376-6980.
