= Norman Wood (politician) =

American politician

Norman Wood (January 24, 1891 – March 11, 1988) was an American politician who served more than 40 years in the Pennsylvania House of Representatives from 1923 to 1965.

Wood was born January 24, 1891, in Fulton Township, Lancaster County. He graduated from Fulton Township High School and attended the George School and Pennsylvania State College. Wood was a dairy farmer before running for office.

Wood's entry into politics was something of an accident. Republican powerbroker William Walton Griest was looking for someone to run for an open seat in the 1922 election and sent an underling to Fulton Township with instructions to bring "that Wood fellow" to meet him. Griest had meant to have Samuel Wood run for election, but due to his vague instructions, Norman Wood ended up coming to his office. Griest decided Norman Wood was up to the task and used his influence to get Norman Wood elected. Wood eventually rose to chairman of his party's caucus. He was re-elected every election until 1964, when he declined to run for another term. He died March 11, 1988, and was buried in Little Britain, Pennsylvania.

The Norman Wood Bridge, which opened in 1968, is named in his honor.
