= Jason Wood (writer) =

British writer on film and cinema (born 1969)

- Born: 1969 (age 56–57)
- Occupations: Writer on film and cinema

Jason Wood (born 1969) is a British writer on film and cinema. He is currently executive director for Public Programmes and Audiences at the BFI.

Wood was formerly the artistic director for Film at HOME, the centre for international contemporary arts, theatre and film formed by the merger of Cornerhouse and the Library Theatre Company. He was also formerly Director of Programming at Curzon Cinemas from 2009 to 2015.

== Career ==
Jason Wood begun his career working in film sales and acquisitions for UK film distribution companies. He went on to become Programming Manager at Picturehouse Cinemas from 2001 until 2009, when he joined Curzon Cinemas.

He has written extensively on film. His debut book was part of the Pocket Essentials series with a guide to Steven Soderbergh, followed by a guide to Hal Hartley. Wood's other books include 100 American Independent Films, published by BFI Publishing, Nick Broomfield: Documenting Icons, The Faber Book of Mexican Cinema, 100 Road Movies and 100 American Independent Films. His next book, The Faber Book of Contemporary British Cinema, was published by Faber in September 2015.

He has also contributed to Time Out's 1000 Films to Change Your Life, The Variety International Film Guide 2010 and TCM's International Film Guide in 2008, 2009 and 2010.

In January 2015, Jason Wood became artistic director for Film at HOME, the centre for international contemporary arts, theatre and film in Manchester.
