= Bernie Wood =

Bernard Joseph Wood MNZM (9 December 1939 – 28 April 2013) was a New Zealand rugby league administrator and sports historian.

== Biography ==
Wood was born in Greymouth in 1939 and was educated at Marist Brothers Boys' School there. He was a member of the New Zealand Schoolboys rugby league team in 1954.

After moving to Wellington, Wood served for 24 years as secretary–treasurer or chairman of the Wellington Rugby League. He was deputy chairman of the New Zealand Rugby League in 1992.

Wood was an historian of rugby league and harness racing in New Zealand, writing several books on the subjects. He edited the New Zealand Rugby League Annual from 1977 to 2002.

In the 2000 New Year Honours, Wood was appointed a Member of the New Zealand Order of Merit, for services to sport. In 2008 he was made a life member of the New Zealand Rugby League.

Wood died of cancer at his home in the Porirua suburb of Whitby in 2013, and was buried at Whenua Tapu Cemetery, Pukerua Bay.

== Books ==
Books written or co-written by Wood include:

- Flying sulkies: a history of the New Zealand Trotting Cup 1904–1980. Moa, Auckland (1981).
- The Cup 1904–2003: 100 years of the New Zealand Trotting Cup. Trio Books, Wellington (2003).
- The Kiwis: 100 years of international rugby league (with John Coffey). Hodder Moa, Auckland (2007).
- 100 years: Māori rugby league, 1908–2008 (with John Coffey). Huia, Wellington (2008).
- Auckland, 100 years of rugby league, 1909–2009 (with John Coffey). Huia, Wellington (2009).
