= Norman Wood (footballer, born 1890) =

English footballer

Personal information
- Full name: Norman Arthur Wood
- Date of birth: 4 November 1890
- Place of birth: Tooting, England
- Date of death: 28 July 1916 (aged 25)
- Place of death: Delville Wood, France
- Height: 5 ft 9 in (1.75 m)
- Position: Inside left

Senior career*
Years	Team	Apps	(Gls)
–1908	Bromley		
1908–1909	Tottenham Hotspur	0	(0)
1909–1910	Crystal Palace	1	(0)
1910–1911	Plymouth Argyle	14	(1)
1911–1912	Croydon Common	13	(4)
1912–1913	Chelsea	0	(0)
1913–1915	Stockport County	58	(12)
1915	Stalybridge Celtic		
1915	Football Battalion	3	(0)
- * Club domestic league appearances and goals

Norman Arthur Wood (4 November 1890 – 28 July 1916) was an English professional footballer who played in the Football League for Stockport County as an inside left. His play was described as "unselfish, for with a crafty left foot he made openings and opportunities for colleagues".

== Personal life ==
On 7 May 1906, Wood enlisted in the 6th (Inniskilling) Dragoons, but was discharged little over two months later, due to "having made a misstatement as to age on enlistment". On 8 February 1915, six months after Britain's entry into the First World War, Wood enlisted in the Football Battalion of the Middlesex Regiment. Despite being demoted to corporal for absenteeism in November 1915, Wood rose to the rank of sergeant. He was killed at Delville Wood in July 1916 and is commemorated on the Thiepval Memorial.

== Career statistics ==
Appearances and goals by club, season and competition
Club	Season	League			FA Cup		Total	
Club	Season	Division	Apps	Goals	Apps	Goals	Apps	Goals
Crystal Palace	1909–10	Southern League First Division	1	0	0	0	1	0
Plymouth Argyle	1910–11	Southern League First Division	14	1	0	0	14	1
Croydon Common	1911–12	Southern League Second Division	13	4	4	2	17	6
Stockport County	1913–14	Second Division	37	10	1	0	38	10
Stockport County	1914–15	Second Division	21	2	1	0	22	2
Stockport County	Total		58	12	2	0	60	12
Career total			86	17	6	2	92	19
