= Royden Wood =

English footballer (1930–2023)

Personal information
- Date of birth: 16 October 1930
- Place of birth: Wallasey, England
- Date of death: 7 February 2023 (aged 92)
- Height: 6 ft 2 in (1.87 m)
- Position: Goalkeeper

Senior career*
Years	Team	Apps	(Gls)
- Harrowby
1950–1951	New Brighton		
1951–1952	Clitheroe		
1952–1959	Leeds United	196	(0)
Total		196	(0)
- * Club domestic league appearances and goals

Royden Wood (16 October 1930 – 7 February 2023) was an English footballer who played as a goalkeeper, notably for Leeds United.

== Early life ==
Wood was born in Wallasey on 16 October 1930. During World War Two, he served with the RAF in the Far East. Wood also played cricket.

== Career ==
Having played for West Cheshire League side Harrowby as a youngster, Wood joined Football League Third Division North side New Brighton in the 1950–51 season, shortly before the club were expelled from the Football League. After holding multiple jobs in the North West of England, including loading lorries in Oxton in Birkenhead, he joined Lancashire Combination side Clitheroe in 1951, before being signed by Football League Second Division side Leeds United in May 1952.

Wood made his debut for Leeds United on 24 October 1953 in a match against Derby County, and went on to make 203 appearances in total for the club, 116 of which came in the First Division, the top tier of English football, following Leeds' promotion in 1956. He retired in 1959 at the age of 28.

== Style of play ==
Wood played as a goalkeeper. He was known for his athleticism and acrobatic displays.

== Retirement and death ==
Following his retirement in 1959, Wood became the manager of a betting shop and was a member of Professional Footballers' Association management committee.

Wood died in February 2023, at the age of 92.
