= Norman Wood (footballer, born 1932) =

English footballer (1932–2022)

Personal information
- Full name: Norman Wood
- Date of birth: 10 August 1932
- Place of birth: Sunderland, England
- Date of death: March 2022 (aged 89)
- Position: Wing half

Youth career
- 1953–1954: Silksworth Juniors

Senior career*
| Years | Team | Apps | (Gls) |
| 1954–1955 | Sunderland | 1 | (0) |
- * Club domestic league appearances and goals

Norman Wood (10 August 1932 – March 2022) was an English professional footballer who played as a wing half for Sunderland. He died in Sunderland in March 2022, at the age of 89.
