= Susan Wood (pharmacologist) =

British pharmacologist, physician and medical regulator

Susan Marion Wood (20 July 1952 – 30 September 1998), was a British pharmacologist, physician and medical regulator, principal assessor for the Committee on Safety of Medicines.

She was born Susan Marion Ryan on 20 July 1952 in Hlatikulu, Swaziland, and educated at King's College London from where she received a first class honours degree in pharmacology in 1973.

Wood was principal assessor for the Committee on Safety of Medicines (CSM), from 1988.

In 1978, she married John Wood. She died on 30 September 1998 in Gerrards Cross, Buckinghamshire.
