= Benjamin Wood (cricketer) =

English cricketer

Personal information
- Full name: Benjamin Shaw Wood
- Born: 25 January 1971 (age 55); Dewsbury, Yorkshire, England
- Batting: Right-handed
- Bowling: Right-arm medium-fast

Domestic team information
- Years: Team
- 1991–1992: Oxford University

Career statistics
Competition	First-class
Matches	13
Runs scored	37
Batting average	4.62
100s/50s	–/–
Top score	13
Balls bowled	1,639
Wickets	16
Bowling average	63.56
5 wickets in innings	–
10 wickets in match	–
Best bowling	2/24
Catches/stumpings	–/–
- Source: Cricinfo, 22 April 2020

Benjamin Shaw Wood (born 25 January 1971) is an English former first-class cricketer.

Wood was born at Dewsbury in January 1971. He later studied at the University of Oxford at Worcester College. While studying at Oxford, he played first-class cricket for Oxford University, making his debut against Hampshire in 1991. He played first-class cricket for Oxford until 1992, making a total of twelve appearances. Playing as a right-arm medium-fast bowler, he took 16 wickets at a high average of 63.56 and with best figures of 2 for 24. A tailend batsman, he scored 24 runs with a high score of 13. In addition to playing first-class cricket for Oxford University, he also made a single appearance for a combined Oxford and Cambridge Universities team against the touring Pakistanis in 1992.
