= Martin B. Wood =

Martin Benjamin Wood (September 16, 1807 - December 23, 1881) was an American farmer, banker, telegraph installer and shareholder. He married Ezra Cornell's sister, Phoebe, in 1837.

He lived in Dryden, New York, and moved to a farm near Homer, Michigan, in 1844. Cornell asked Wood to oversee construction of his lines in Michigan. Wood was a shareholder in Cornell's company whose stock sold for $50 per share and he was named treasurer in 1853. Phoebe ran the Albion telegraph office in 1849 and continued for eight years. When the Erie and Michigan line was rebuilt along the Michigan Central Railway by the newly formed Western Union in 1856, Wood served as master of repairs of the Western Division and also for the Wabash Railway line.

Wood was a member of the Albion Village Board in 1855 and village president in 1859. Vice President and director National Exchange Bank of Albion, 1865. Member of the Board of Control of Albion College in 1865.

He is buried at Riverside Cemetery, Albion, Michigan.
