= Jefferson Wood =

American graphic designer

- Born: Jefferson Daniel Wood; July 6, 1973 (age 53); San Bernardino, California
- Education: Savannah College of Art and Design
- Known for: Graphic design, Poster art
- Awards: Pollstar CIC first, 2004, 2009

Jefferson Wood (born July 6, 1973) is an American artist and one of the leading designers of concert posters and admats for the music industry. Wood is closely identified with Tom Petty & The Heartbreakers, Jimmy Buffett, Sublime with Rome, George Jones, Paul McCartney, Imagine Dragons, Nipsey Hussle, Luke Combs, ZZ Top, The Highwaymen, GG Allin, The Doobie Brothers, Xxxtentacion, Eminem, Van Halen and Todd Rundgren, designing some of their best known posters and admats. He also makes admats for celebrities outside of the music industry, such as the comedian Gabriel Iglesias. His posters are featured in many films and documentaries, including the Runnin' Down a Dream As a comic book artist, his work appeared regularly in Image Comics Big Bang Comics and other titles in the 1990s

== Education ==
Wood studied at the Savannah College of Art and Design where he received a BA in 1995. He was the first in the world to graduate with a degree in Sequential art. Wood studied under comic book illustrator Bo Hampton (who himself was a student under Will Eisner and Al Williamson).

== Posters ==
Wood's illustration style is somewhat unusual compared to other poster designers, consisting of brushlines and cross hatching. He is ambidextrous and can simultaneously pencil with both hands at the same time, or ink with one hand and pencil with the other.

Wood does not make his posters available to the general public. They are screen printed in small quantities and only made available to promoters for the advertising of live concert events. The majority of his posters are displayed and subsequently damaged by the elements. Because of the rarity of examples of his work in excellent condition, many of his posters have sold for thousands of dollars.
An underground economy has grown out of this situation, that has resulted in people removing his posters often after only hanging up for a few hours for the purpose of re-selling. In response to this some promoters have used wheat paste to permanently adhere a poster to the sides of buildings. A collector chiseled around a wheat pasted poster and removed a portion of a wall to retrieve it.

== Awards and accolades ==
The poster that won the 2009 Pollstar competition.

1st place Best Poster of the Year in the first ever Pollstar Concert Industry Consortium (CIC) poster contest (in 2004) with his poster for Tom Petty and the Heartbreakers.
That same poster was ranked No. 18 best rock poster of all time by Billboard Magazine.
His poster for The B-52s was ranked No. 1 Best Poster of the Year in the Pollstar CIC poster competition in 2009. His poster for The Doobie Brothers was ranked No. 2 Best Poster of the Year in the Pollstar CIC poster competition in 2022.
