= Benjamin T. Wood =

American architect

- Education: Massachusetts Institute of Technology
- Occupation: Architect
- Projects: Xintiandi

Benjamin T. Wood is an American architect who designed Shanghai's famous Xintiandi, which means “New Heaven and Earth,” a refined cluster of traditionally styled Shanghai brick town houses near the old French Concession district.

Wood flew the Mach II Phantom RF-4 jet aircraft for the US Air Force for five years.

At 31, he enrolled in a graduate architecture program at the Massachusetts Institute of Technology. Upon graduation, Wood worked with Benjamin C. Thompson at Benjamin Thompson and Associates. He started his own firm with Ecuadoran Carlos Zapata in 1998 with a commission to rebuild Soldier Field, the Chicago Bears' stadium.

== Work in Chicago ==
Wood and Zapata, along with Dirk Lohan, the grandson of architect Ludwig Mies van der Rohe, of the Chicago-based architecture firm of Lohan Associates, designed the Soldier Field renovation. Wood also designed the proposed 100,000-seat Olympic Stadium located in historic Washington Park for the USA 2016 Olympic bid. The design called for most of the stadium seating to be disassembled, leaving behind a small bowl and the track.

== Work in China ==
Wood's work at Xintiandi has become a symbol of the changing aspirations China has for Shanghai.

Xintiandi’s influence “is such that every city wants to have one.” Wood has applied his formula to projects all over mainland China, from Chongqing to Wuhan to Hangzhou. In Hangzhou he adapted 10 blocks of a sleepy lakeside area into a resort with pagoda-style roof-scapes, trellis-covered walkways and a high-tech conference center. For his $80 million Cambridge Watertown project in Zhujiajiao, he has proposed narrow canals inspired by China’s 13th-century water-town plans stitched together with picturesque foot bridges and semi-detached contemporary-style condos.

As Paul Goldberger pointed out, "Xintiandi is so successful that Shui On has been asked to replicate its formula elsewhere in China, and other developers are trying to build copycat projects. Christopher Choa, an American architect who lives in Shanghai, told me, “It has become a verb. Developers say to architects, ‘Can you Xintiandi this project for me?’ The young Chinese people come because they think it’s trendy, the foreigners come because they think it’s historically significant, and the old people come because they feel nostalgia.”
