= Douglas Wood (engineer) =

Australian construction engineer

- Born: 30 June 1941; Australia
- Died: 31 December 2019 (aged 78); Australia

Douglas Wood (30 June 1941 – 31 December 2019) was an Australian construction engineer who had worked with the American military, and was held hostage in Iraq for six weeks between May and June 2005, before being rescued in an army raid on a house.

== Early life ==
Wood was born in Whyalla, South Australia in 1941. He moved to Geelong where he attended the Geelong College and the Gordon Institute of TAFE, graduating as a mechanical engineer. In 1973 he left Australia to work in the United States, moving to Alamo, California, where he lived with his American wife and daughter, and employed by construction company Bechtel Corporation for 25 years. He later formed his own company and moved from his Californian home to Iraq. His work involved project management, and building nuclear plants; including the Palo Verde Nuclear Generating station in Arizona, US.

== Kidnapping ==
In 2005, Wood was kidnapped along with two Iraqi business associates and forced into a cell, while at a home in Baghdad, Iraq where he was organising a business deal. On 2 May 2005, Arabic television network al-Jazeera broadcast footage of Wood being held by armed captors, identified as the Shura Council of the Mujahideen of Iraq. Wood was shown pleading for his life, and urging Australia and the United States to withdraw their troops from the country.

On 4 May 2005, Al-Jazeera broadcast an appeal by Foreign Minister Alexander Downer and Wood's brothers for the insurgents to free Wood. By 7 May 2005, new footage emerged showing Wood, having sustained injuries, with machine guns held to his head. In the video, he read aloud an order to withdraw troops from Iraq within 72 hours. In response, Imam Sheik Alhilali flew to Iraq on 9 May 2005 to attempt to assist with Wood's release. It is during this time that Alhilali claims to have seen Wood, confirming that he was still alive.

In response to suggestions that the Australian government or Wood's family might make payments to the kidnappers, Prime Minister John Howard stated that Australia will neither pull troops out, nor pay any ransom that might be demanded. Downer added that any concession to demands could encourage further kidnappings. Wood's family conducted a public relations campaign in both Australia and Iraq, to convince Mr Wood's captors that he was a family man who sympathises with their cause. On 10 May 2005, the deadline given by the kidnappers expired at 5pm Australian time, however there was no indication that Wood had been killed.

Six weeks after his capture, Wood was found and rescued by Iraqi army troops from a house in Ghazaliya, with assistance from U.S. forces. The Iraqi troops were performing a routine raid of a suspected weapons cache at the house, before finding Wood. Brigadier General Jaleel Khalaf Shewi, commander of the Iraqi brigade which rescued Wood, said a brief firefight had taken place during the operation, but there were no casualties on either side. It was revealed that Wood's Iraqi business associates had been killed a month earlier.

On 15 June 2005, news of the rescue was relayed to senior Australian diplomat in Baghdad, Nick Warner. Footage was aired in Australia by CNN showing Wood talking to soldiers and sitting up in bed in a medical facility in Baghdad. Prime Minister John Howard subsequently acknowledged the efforts of Australia's Muslim community and cleric Sheikh Taj al-Din Alhilali, while also confirming that no ransom had been paid. On 20 June, Alhilali returned to Australia, claiming that Douglas Wood would have been killed if it had not been for his intervention. Wood has, however, denied that he ever spoke to Alhilali during his capture.

== Aftermath and political position ==
In 2009, Wood contacted Prime Minister Kevin Rudd, claiming that seven of the ten Iraqi soldiers who rescued Wood in 2005 have been systematically murdered. He argues that they were targeted after giving evidence against his kidnappers. In response, two Iraqi service personnel were granted permanent refugee visas under Australia's humanitarian program, after an assessment of their applications found they were in grave and imminent danger.

Wood had previously worked on the failed feasibility study for the Jervis Bay Nuclear Power Plant, and in response to John Howard's plan for nuclear power production in Australia, Wood stated that he would happily live next door to a nuclear power plant, and would assist in development of an Australian nuclear energy industry. However, he stated his concerns that Australia's engineers and industrial suppliers are under-qualified to build a local plant.
