= Susan Buxton Wood =

British philanthropist and writer

Susan Wood
- Born: Susan Buxton; 1918; Democratic Republic of the Congo
- Died: 2006 (aged 87–88); Nairobi, Kenya
- Occupations: Philanthropist, writer
- Spouse: Sir Michael Wood
- Children: Four

Susan Wood (1918-2006), British philanthropist and writer who helped create the African Medical Research Foundation (Amref) in Kenya and founded an enterprise to employ poor single mothers. She lived much of her life in Kenya.

== Life ==
Susan Buxton was born in an African mud hut. At the time, her English missionary parents were living in the Ituri Rainforest in an area now known as the Democratic Republic of the Congo. At the age of two, she was carried in a litter on a six-month journey to the Nile and on to England where she spent her childhood. During training as a World War II nurse, she met the physician Michael Wood and they married in 1943, eventually having four children together.

The young family moved to Kenya in 1947 seeking to make a difference there. Michael Wood set up a medical practice in Nairobi but demands for his surgical skills came from far beyond the city causing him to charter private flights to reach patients in remote locations. Soon he learned to fly and bought his own plane. To expand the reach of medical care, Susan and Michael Wood worked together to recruit more doctors and create the Flying Doctors Service, which evolved into the African Medical Research Foundation, and still later to Amref Health Africa. Michael Wood remained Director General of Amref for 29 years and Susan's work there continued even after her husband's death in 1987.

=== Kazuri Beads enterprise ===
In the 1960s, Susan and Michael Wood started a coffee plantation on the estate of the late Karen Blixen (made famous in the award-winning movie Out of Africa) about 30 minutes from the center of Nairobi. In 1975, Susan set up a new business in a back garden called Kazuri beads; Kazuri is a Swahili word meaning small and beautiful.

[Susan Wood] started by hiring two disadvantaged women and quickly realized that there were many more women who were in need of jobs and so Kazuri Beads was created and began its long and successful journey as a help center for the needy women especially single mothers who had no other source of income. In 1988 Kazuri became a factory and expanded hugely with over 120 women and men. Here women are trained and apply their skills to produce these unique and beautiful beads and jewelry. The beads are made with clay from the Mount Kenya area thus giving them authenticity to their craft. The factory acts as a social gathering with the hum of voices continuing throughout the day. With unemployment so high, one jobholder often ends up providing for an "extended family" of 20 or more. Kazuri is a member of the Fair Trade Act.

In 2006, when Susan Wood died, the enterprise employed 200 women, mostly single mothers crafting handmade, hand-painted ceramic jewelry. As of 2020, more than 300 people worked for Kazuri and their products were being sold worldwide.

=== Tanzanian years ===
The Wood family lived and farmed for a time on the slopes of Mount Kilimanjaro, in Tanzania. There, according to Hughes, "Sue enjoyed being a farmer. In 1975 the farm was taken over by the Tanzanian government, and the Woods, sadly but without complaint, moved to Karen [in Kenya]."

=== Last years ===
Susan Wood died in 2006 at her Nairobi-area home at the age of 87, survived by four children, eight grandchildren and eight great-grandchildren. Hughes recorded her thoughts about life in Africa, "She always saw herself as an African and had a deep understanding of the struggles they faced. She said: 'I love the people, and I love Africa because everything is unexpected, nothing goes quite straightforwardly.'"

== Awards and honors ==
In 1990, Susan Wood was honored by the British government as a Member of the Most Excellent Order of the British Empire (MBE).

== Selected works ==
Throughout her life, Wood wrote about African life and issues and authored several books and volumes of poetry.

- Wood, Susan. Kenya: The Tensions of Progress ... Issued Under the Auspices of the Institute of Race Relations. London: O.U.P, 1960. Print.
- Wood, Susan. A Fly in Amber. London: Collins-Harvill, 1964. Print.
- Wood, Susan. A String of Beads: Stories of Africa Today. Nairobi: publisher not identified, 1995. Print.
- Wood, Susan. Tree Music. Nairobi, Kenya: Jacaranda Designs, 2002. Print.
- Wood, Susan. Tales from Africa. Nairobi, Kenya: Jacaranda Designs, 2004. Print.
- Wood, Susan. As Falls the Rain. Nairobi, Kenya: Jacaranda Designs, 2005. Print.
