= Benjamin D. Wood =

American educational psychologist (1894–1986)

Ben D. Wood
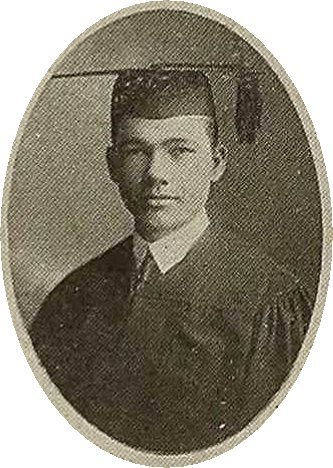
- 1917 graduation portrait University of Texas
- Born: Benjamin DeKalbe Wood; November 10, 1894; Brownsville, Texas, U.S.
- Died: July 8, 1986 (aged 91); Westchester, New York
- Other name: Ben D. Wood
- Education: Brownsville Area Schools
- Occupations: Psychologist and educator
- Employer: Teachers College, Columbia University
- Known for: Modern educational psychology
- Spouse: Grace T. Wood

Benjamin DeKalbe Wood (November 10, 1894 – July 6, 1986) was an American educator, researcher, and director / professor at Columbia University and an expert in the educational field.

== Early life ==
Wood was born in Brownsville, Texas, on November 10, 1894. He attended the Brownsville area schools, Mission High School, and the University of Texas.

== Career ==
Wood was a Phi Beta Kappa and a member of the New York Academy of Sciences, the American Psychological Association, and the American Association for the Advancement of Science.

In 1928, he met IBM's leader Thomas J. Watson and joined the company as a consultant; IBM helped Wood to fund the Columbia Statistical Bureau and provided equipment. Their collaboration was also beneficial for IBM, as Wood helped IBM to develop more capable machines. This success led to further academic projects, including the Harvard Mark I, and Columbia invited Watson to join their board of trustees in 1933.

In academics, he was a curator of Stephens College, and the chair or director of 20 national education committees. He was a director of Eastman's teaching film experiment, the American Council of Education test service, and the Commonwealth Fund for research on measurement of achievement in college courses. He led the development of the National Teachers Exam before it was acquired by Educational Testing Services.

Wood served on the New York state board of regents' examining board, and on committees for the American Institute of Accountants.

== Later life and death ==
Woods retired in 1960 but remained active. In 1969, he was given the Teachers College Medal for Distinguished Service. He received an honorary doctor degree from Union College in New York, from Lawrence College in Wisconsin, and from Colorado State Teachers College. Wood died at the age of 91 of a heart attack on July 8, 1986.

== Legacy ==
Wood established the Elbenwood Fund for Education Research, the Ben D. Wood Fellowship Economic Fund and the Institute for Learning Technologies Fund. Twenty-six students had qualified through 2009. The Ben D. Wood Paper are held at the Archives of the History of American Psychology in Akron, Ohio.

== Works ==
Books published by Wood are:

- The Measurement of College Work (1921)
- The Measurement of Law School Work (1924)
- Columbia Research Bureau American History Test (1926)
- Motion Pictures in the Classroom (1929)
- Study of the Relations of Secondary and Higher Education in Pennsylvania (1938)
- Our Air-age World: A Textbook in Global Geography (1945)
- Geography of the World (1959)

== Sources ==
- Baker, R. Scott (2006). Paradoxes of Desegregation. Univ of South Carolina Press. ISBN 978-1-57003-632-3.
