= Roy Wood (baseball) =

American baseball player (1892–1974)

- Outfielder/First baseman
- Born: August 29, 1892; Monticello, Arkansas, U.S.
- Died: April 6, 1974 (aged 81); Fayetteville, Arkansas, U.S.
- Batted: Right Threw: Right

MLB debut
- June 16, 1913, for the Pittsburgh Pirates

Last MLB appearance
- June 19, 1915, for the Cleveland Indians

MLB statistics
- Batting average: .231
- Home runs: 1
- Runs batted in: 20
- Stats at Baseball Reference

Teams
- Pittsburgh Pirates (1913); Cleveland Naps/Indians (1914–15)

Roy Winton Wood (August 29, 1892 – April 6, 1974), nicknamed "Woody", was an American professional baseball player. He played all or part of three seasons in Major League Baseball from 1913 through 1915 for the Pittsburgh Pirates (1913) and Cleveland Naps/Indians (1914–1915). Listed at 6 ft 0 in (1.83 m), 175 lb., Wood batted and threw right-handed. A native of Monticello, Arkansas, he attended University of Arkansas.

In a three-season career, Wood posted a .231 batting average (77 hits in 333 at bats) with one home run and 20 RBI in 119 games, including 33 runs, 12 doubles, four triples and seven stolen bases. He played first base and all three outfield positions.

Wood died in Fayetteville, Arkansas, at the age of 81.
