= Barry Wood (bishop) =

South African Roman Catholic bishop

Barry Alexander Anthony Wood (13 June 1942 – 2 May 2017) was a Roman Catholic bishop from South Africa.

Ordained to the priesthood in 1968, Wood served as titular bishop of Babra and auxiliary bishop to the Roman Catholic Archdiocese of Durban from 2005 until his death in 2017.
