= Roger Wood (colonial administrator) =

Governor of Bermuda

Governor of Bermuda
- In office 1629–1637
- Preceded by: Captain Philip Bell
- Succeeded by: Captain Thomas Chaddock

Personal details
- Died: 1654

Roger Wood (died 1654) was governor of Bermuda from 1629 to 1637, replacing Captain Philip Bell.

== Governor of Bermuda ==
As governor of Bermuda, Wood was in charge of a colony that was struggling to make a living by growing tobacco, handicapped by land of poor quality and in short supply. By the 1630s the population was about 3,000, but only had 6,000 to 8,000 acres (2,400 to 3,200 ha) of land that could be cultivated. Although Bermuda was poor, there was never a shortage of food. In 1631, Roger Wood wrote, "I thanke God we abound with all kind of provision for our subsistance as corne, potatoes, hoggs, Turkeys, and foules in great plenty, besydes owr fruits ... God is thus mercifull unto us, that although [they] may have almost naked backes and bare feet, yet they have full bellies." The islanders also obtained food by fishing.

Trade increased while Wood was governor. In 1632 he recorded that four ships were anchored at Bermuda, of which one was the London magazine ship. The island's edible produce was a growing source of revenue. In 1633, 1634 and 1635, vessels from Massachusetts, Barbados, Virginia and New Netherland came to buy potatoes, corn, pork, oranges, lemons, cattle and other food for the growing populations of these colonies. Privateers also provided a market. Trade with the new world colonies was encouraged by the taxes that the Sommer Islands Company placed on trade between Bermuda and England.

Wood said of "aquavitae", the name used for any strong fermented liquor, "A dramme in a hott day when men have been to hear preach, or planting or hoeing, or other worke in the fields, tastes well."

== Religion and morality ==
Wood was well-read and deeply religious. He was a Puritan, and did not always conform with official Church of England practices. Thus in 1629 he proclaimed a fast to cure Roger Sterrop of demonic possession, and many of the island's inhabitants took part in the day-long session of sermons and prayer that led to Sterrop's cure. Wood tried to recruit non-conforming clergy to the island. He tried to get the congregationalist leader William Ames to come to the island, saying one of its advantages over New England was that "We are also far more secure from the hierarchical jurisdiction than New England is, for no great prelate will leave his pontifical palace to take his journey to live upon a barren rock".

Although Wood occasionally used the word "slaves" for blacks, generally he called them "servants", in contrast to Barbados. He said of the enslaved black people the company had provided him that the women were "lyving vpon my charge, for they doe little else than to looke to theire children for no man wilbe troubled with them". He accepted this situation and did not look for a way to get the women working in the fields. He wanted to ensure that children in families he enslaved were put to work with masters who would look after their education. In his 1653 will, Wood fulfilled a promise he had made more than twenty years earlier, and made a provision for a 27-year-old black man, described as "Roger the son of Louis and Maria." In 1654, he bequeathed a silver beaker made around 1590/1591 for use in the sacrament to Christ's Devonshire Parish Church.
