= South Carolina Highway 162 =

State highway in South Carolina, United States

South Carolina Highway 162

Route information
- Maintained by SCDOT
- Length: 13.540 mi (21.791 km)

Major junctions
- West end: SC 174 in Adams Run
- SC 164 in Hollywood; SC 165 in Hollywood
- East end: US 17 in Rantowles

Location
- Country: United States
- State: South Carolina
- Counties: Charleston

Highway system
- South Carolina State Highway System; Interstate; US; State; Scenic
← SC 161	→ SC 164

South Carolina Highway 162 (SC 162) is a 13.540-mile (21.791 km) state highway in the U.S. state of South Carolina. The highway connects Adams Run and Rantowles, via Hollywood.

== Route description ==
SC 162 begins at an intersection with SC 174 in Adams Run, within Charleston County. It travels to the east-southeast and almost immediately curves to the east-northeast. A short distance later, it enters Hollywood. It has an intersection with SC 164 at its eastern terminus. It passes R. D. Schroder Middle School and C.C. Blaney Elementary School. After passing Baptist Hill High School, the highway crosses over Lower Toogoodoo Creek. In the main part of the town, it has an intersection with SC 165 at the Herbert Gadson Intersection. SC 162 passes the Lowcountry Leadership Charter School before traveling along the southern edge of Dungannon Heritage Preserve/Wildlife Management Area. It then crosses over Log Bridge Creek on an unnamed bridge. The highway then enters Rantowles, where it meets its eastern terminus, an intersection with U.S. Route 17 (US 17; Savannah Highway).

== Major intersections ==
The entire route is in Charleston County.

Location	mi	km	Destinations	Notes
Adams Run	0.000	0.000	SC 174 to US 17 – Edisto Beach, Walterboro	Western terminus
Hollywood	2.260	3.637	SC 164 west – Edisto Beach	Eastern terminus of SC 164
Hollywood	6.540	10.525	SC 165 – Meggett, Yonges Island, Ravenel	Herbert Gadson Intersection
Rantowles	13.540	21.791	US 17 (Savannah Highway) – Savannah, Charleston	Eastern terminus
1.000 mi = 1.609 km; 1.000 km = 0.621 mi
