= South Carolina Highway 164 =

Highway in South Carolina, United States

South Carolina Highway 164

Route information
- Maintained by SCDOT
- Length: 2.500 mi (4.023 km)

Major junctions
- West end: SC 174 near Hollywood
- East end: SC 162 in Hollywood

Location
- Country: United States
- State: South Carolina
- Counties: Charleston

Highway system
- South Carolina State Highway System; Interstate; US; State; Scenic
← SC 162	→ SC 165

South Carolina Highway 164 (SC 164) is a 2.500-mile-long (4.023 km) state highway in the U.S. state of South Carolina. Most of the highway travels through Hollywood and acts as a shortcut between Hollywood and Edisto Beach.

== Route description ==
SC 164 begins at an intersection with SC 174 west-southwest of Hollywood, within Charleston County, where the roadway continues as Willtown Road. It travels to the northeast as a two-lane road with a 55 miles per hour (89 km/h) speed limit. It enters the city limits of Hollywood. After a short distance, SC 164 meets its eastern terminus, an intersection with SC 162.

== Major intersections ==
The entire route is in Charleston County.

Location	mi	km	Destinations	Notes
	0.000	0.000	SC 174 to US 17 / Willtown Road – Edisto Beach, Edisto Beach State Park, ACE Basin NWR	Western terminus
Hollywood	2.500	4.023	SC 162 – Hollywood, Charleston, Adams Run, Walterboro	Eastern terminus
1.000 mi = 1.609 km; 1.000 km = 0.621 mi
