= Parkers Ferry, South Carolina =

Coordinates: 32°45′37″N 80°23′46″W

Parkers Ferry is a small unincorporated community in Charleston County, South Carolina. Neighboring communities include Willtown Bluff, Jericho, Osborne, and Adams Run. Parker's Ferry falls within Adams Run's zip code, 29426. The elevation of Parkers Ferry is 20 feet, and it is in the Eastern Time Zone. Penny Creek is the primary water source of this community.

== Battle of Parker's Ferry ==
An American Revolutionary War skirmish, the Battle of Parker's Ferry, in which the Patriot forces were led by Brigadier General Francis Marion, occurred near Parkers Ferry on August 30 or 31, 1781. The American Battlefield Trust and its partners have preserved 31 acres of the Parker's Ferry Battlefield as of mid-2023.

== Historic plantations ==
Parker Ferrys is home to three historic plantations – Battlefield Plantation, Barings Plantation, and Encampment Plantation.

=== Barings Plantation ===
Barings Plantation was originally owned by Thomas Middleton. It was later named after Charles Baring II, who purchased the 1,200-acre (490 ha) plot of land from Middleton in 1831. Barings Plantation was home to over 140 slaves in 1850. The primary crop was rice. According to the 1850 Agriculture Census, Barings Plantation produced 570,000 pounds of rice, 2,000 bushels of corn, 2,000 bushels of peas, and 1,600 bushels of sweet potatoes. The livestock on the plantation included 30 milk cows, 15 horses, 16 oxen, 150 sheep, and 300 other cattle.

After a series of purchases between different owners, the Barings Plantation was later renamed the Sandy Point Plantation in 1995. Owners frequently found prehistoric fossils, such as megalodon teeth, and artifacts from Civil War, Revolutionary War and pre–Revolutionary war times, including Indian spearheads, pipes, and pottery.

=== Encampment Plantation ===
Encampment Plantation was owned by Robert Young Hayne, senator and governor of South Carolina. It is speculated that the property may have been the location where troops were stationed during the Revolutionary War to guard South Carolina's state government, which met across the Edisto River during the British occupation of Charleston. The primary crop was rice. The plantation is estimated 794 acres in size.

== Churches ==
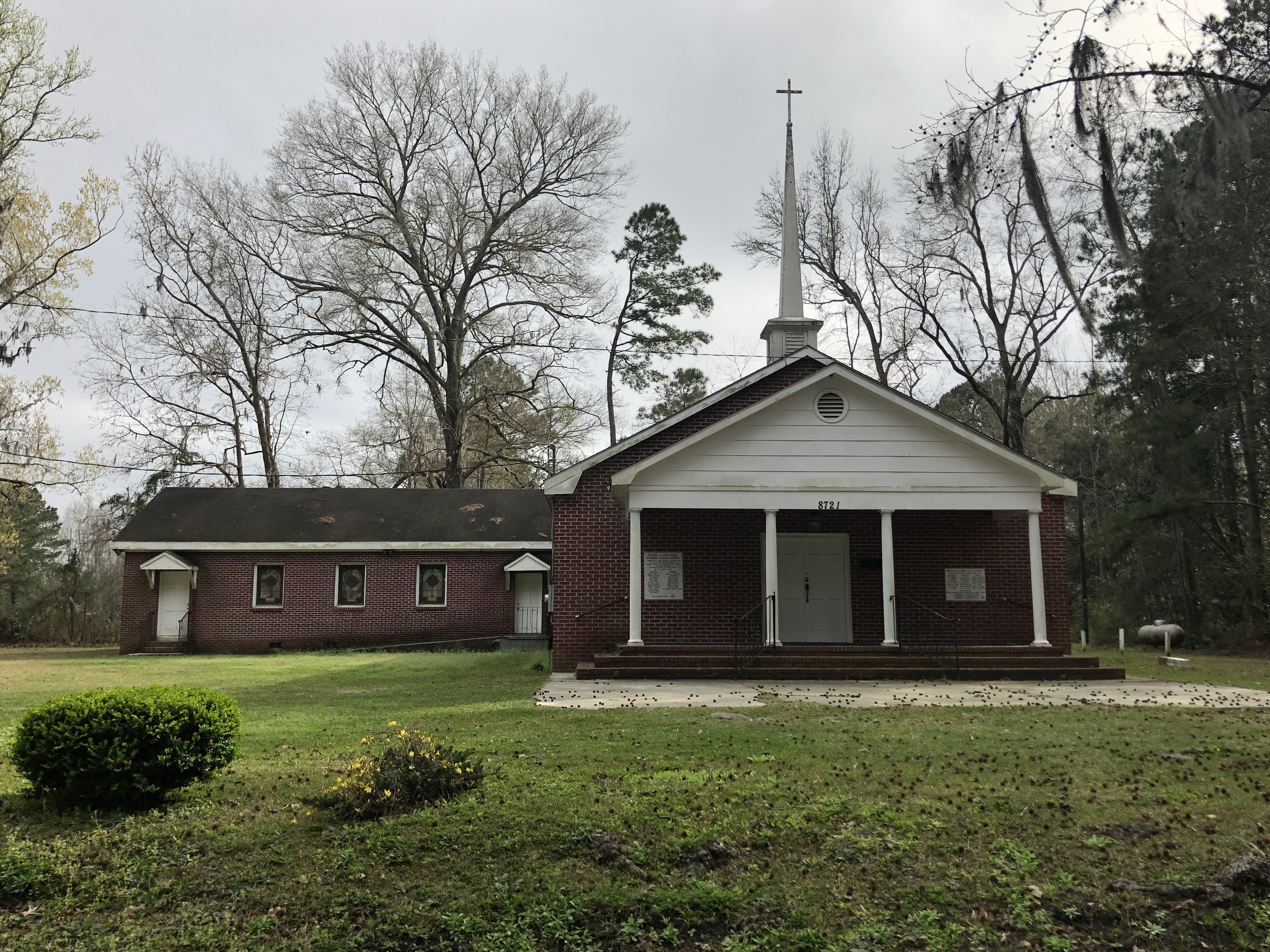
Greater St. Mark AME

Greater St. Mark AME Church, Shiloh Missionary Baptist Church, and Greater New Bethlehem AME Church are three major churches in the Parker's Ferry community. Greater St. Mark AME Church was originally founded on April 11, 1879. It was rebuilt in 1968, and renovated again in 1992. Greater St. Mark AME's cemetery is located two miles south of the church.

== Wiltown Community Center ==
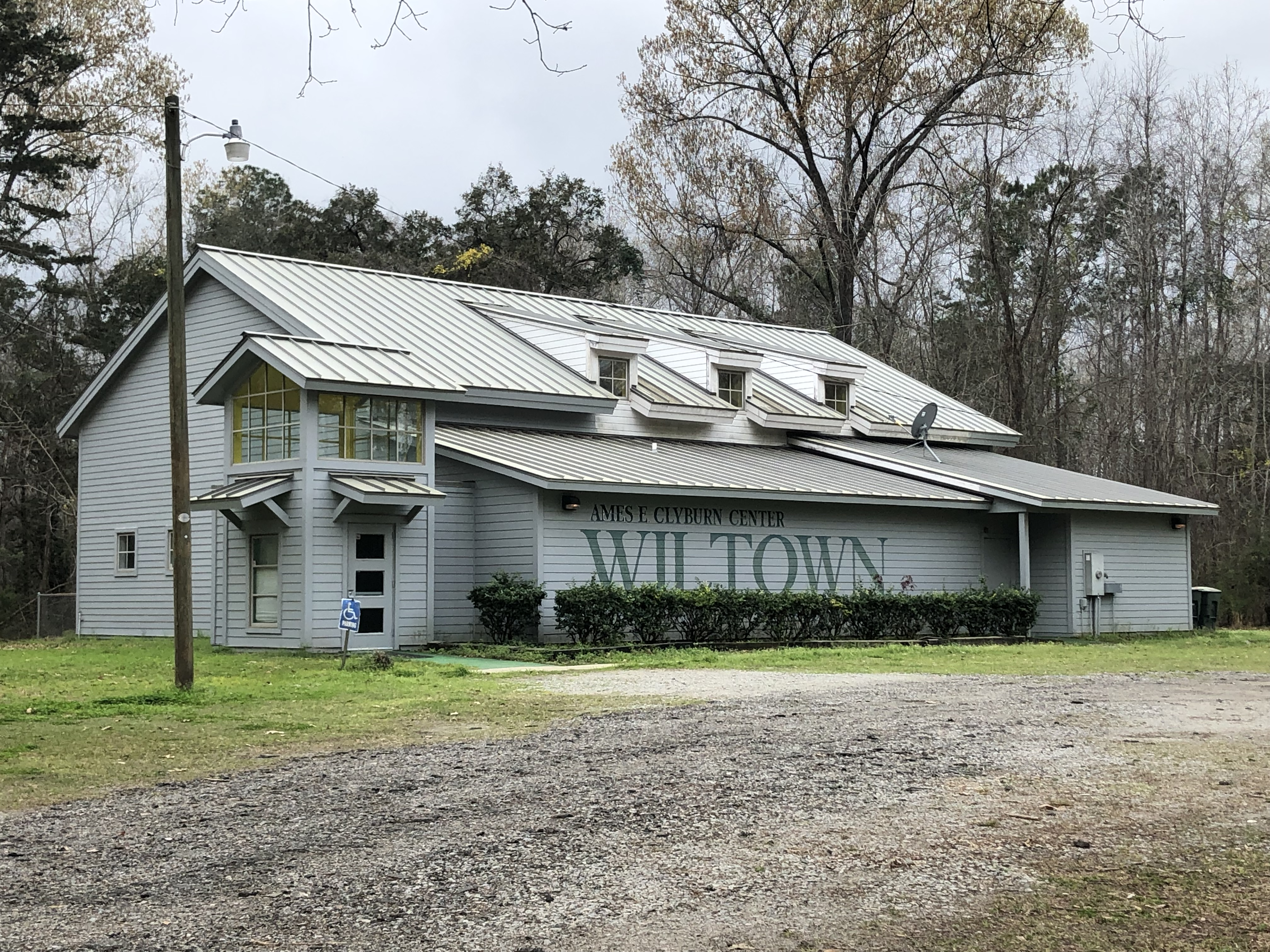
Wiltown Community Center

The Wiltown Community Center (formally, the James E. Clyburn Wiltown Community Center, was built in 2003 and is located in the vicinity of the Parkers Ferry playground. The Wiltown Community Center is used for gatherings, worship service, and local community events, such as the Parkers Ferry Parade. The Parkers Ferry Parade is held annually on the third Saturday of May and typically attracts a crowd of 500 people.
