= Lucille Whipper =

American politician (1928–2021)

Member of the South Carolina House of Representatives from the 109th district
- In office 1986 – November 8, 1996
- Preceded by: Robert Roosevelt Woods
- Succeeded by: David Mack

Personal details
- Born: Lucille Simmons; June 6, 1928 Charleston, South Carolina, U.S.
- Died: August 27, 2021 (aged 93)
- Party: Democratic

Lucille Simmons Whipper (June 6, 1928 – August 27, 2021) was an American Democratic Party politician who served in the South Carolina House of Representatives from 1986 to 1996. Whipper is most well known for accomplishments in both education and politics. In the educational field, Whipper worked at two high schools before landing a job at the College of Charleston. Here, Whipper implemented an affirmative action program and played a major role in integrating the Avery Institute, a center dedicated to African American history, with the college. In politics, Whipper was the first black woman to represent a Charleston County seat in the legislature. She was also the first woman of color ever to be elected to the South Carolina General Assembly.

== Early life ==
Lucille Whipper was born on June 6, 1928, in Charleston, South Carolina. She was the daughter of Joseph Simmons and Sarah Washington, a couple who separated when Whipper was young. Growing up, Whipper spent her time in North Charleston and in the Liberty Hill section of east Charleston. Whipper attended high school at the Avery Institute, an all-black high school in Charleston, South Carolina. Here, Whipper had an encounter with civil rights activism when her graduating class sought to desegregate the College of Charleston. A large group of people in her class applied to the College of Charleston, but their efforts of desegregation were unsuccessful. After becoming a private school, the college was able to stay segregated.

== Education ==
Although Whipper was denied (along with a large part of her graduating class) from the College of Charleston, she was accepted into Talladega College in Alabama. Here, she earned a Bachelor of Arts in economics and sociology. Later, Whipper went to the University of Chicago, graduating in 1955 with a Masters of Arts degree in political science.

== Career ==
=== Academic positions ===
After graduating from Talladega College, Whipper went back to Charleston where she taught social studies at public schools. Then, in 1955 (after graduating from the University of Chicago), Whipper returned to Charleston where she worked as the director of guidance services at two prominent all-black high schools: Burke High School and Bonds-Wilson High School. In the late 1960s, Whipper and a few others jumped on the opportunity to start Operation Catch-Up, a program funded by a federal grant coming from Andrew Johnson's “War on Poverty.” Operation Catch-Up sought to tutor and mentor underserved high school students in the Charleston area. As director of this county wide program, Whipper successfully placed many high school graduates into colleges and universities.

In 1972, Whipper landed a job at the College of Charleston as Director of the Office of Human Relations and Assistant to the President, making her the first African American to hold this position. Serving under administrator Theodore Stern, Whipper led the way in developing the school's first affirmative action plan. In 1975, Whipper took a leave of absence to focus her attention back to public schooling. During this time, she worked on directing a multimillion-dollar federal project called the Elementary and Secondary School Aid Act (ESSA). As director of ESSA, Whipper worked in collaboration with the Charleston County School District to develop school programs in the area.

After two years, Whipper returned to the College of Charleston where she continued her work as Director of the Office of Human Relations and Assistant to the President. At the College of Charleston, she helped transform her old High School (the Avery Institute) into the Avery Institute of Afro-American History and Culture. With the support of a variety of members on the Charleston College Academic board and the president of the college, Theodore Stern, Whipper was able to organize the Avery Institute of Afro-American History and Culture committee. In 1985, this committee created the Avery Research Center for African American History and Culture. Whipper's work and dedication to the Avery Institute played a critical role in its preservation and integration with the College of Charleston. Whipper eventually ended her career at the College of Charleston in 1981 when she retired.

=== Political career ===
Whipper first entered politics in 1972 when she served as vice chairman of the Democratic Party Convention. She was eventually elected to the school board of Charleston District 20, a position she held from 1978 to 1982. Later, Whipper sought a position of greater public service, and in 1986, she became the first African American woman to be elected to a South Carolina seat in the House of Representatives. Whipper was the first women of color to ever be elected to the South Carolina General Assembly, too. Whipper was a democrat and represented seat 109, a working class district covering parts of the East Copper area, North Charleston, and the center of the Charleston peninsula. She served for ten years where she had two major legislative contributions. She sponsored one piece of legislature that made marital rape a crime, and another piece of legislature that allowed minorities and females to be hired more easily in the workplace. In addition, Whipper fought for women to get insurance coverage for mammograms. In 1992, Whipper was nominated for Speaker Pro Tempore (a top leadership post in the House), by Tim Rodgers in an attempt to send positive signals to the blacks. In a 36–86 vote, Whipper lost the race the Representative David H. Wilkins. Whipper officially stepped down from office in 1996 which marked the end of her 10-year stint in the House. In 1999, Whipper's service in office was recognized by the South Carolina state government after they decided to name a connector bridge in Charleston after her.

== Awards and honors ==
- Honorary Doctorates of Humane Letters from Morris College (1989) and the University of Charleston (1992)
- Legislator of the Year (1992)
- Inducted into the South Carolina Hall of Fame (1995)
- Listed as one of “Charleston’s One Hundred Most Influential since 1670” in Charleston Magazine (2007)

== Personal life ==
While attending Talladega College, Whipper married her first husband, who died shortly after they got married. His death forced Whipper to move back to Charleston and provide for her infant son while teaching at public high schools. In 1957, Whipper married Reverend Benjamin Whipper, who later died on June 13, 1998, at 85 years old. Benjamin Whipper had 5 children from a previous relationship, and Lucille Whipper had one child from a previous relationship. When they got married, their families blended and they had one child together. The Whipper's sent all seven of their children to college. One of their children, Seth Whipper, followed in Whipper's footsteps and served as a representative in the South Carolina House of Representatives.

Whipper's husband, Benjamin, was a prominent member of the church. He was a pastor at two Charleston churches (Charity Baptist Church and St. Matthew Baptist Church) for nearly five decades. In addition, he became a prominent member of the National Baptist Convention USA Inc where he became well acquainted with some of the most influential baptist's in the nation. Like her husband, Whipper was also involved with the church. For example, Whipper served as a faculty member of the National Congress of Christian Education. In addition, Whipper was president of the Women's Educational and Missionary Convention of South Carolina.

=== Activism ===
Outside of the church and after retirement from the House of Representatives, Whipper continued her activist endeavors. In 2003, for example, Whipper founded Low Country Aid to Africa (LCAA), an organization dedicated towards raising awareness and money for Africa. LCAA was ultimately created because Whipper believed the media was ignoring Africa's problems, especially since the Sept. 11 attacks. This initiative has raised tens of thousands of dollars for both African children affected by AIDS and local HIV/AIDS prevention clinics.

In 2006, Whipper and retired financial executive Paul Hines actively backed 4 people (Toya Green, Ruth Jordan, Gregg Meyers and Susan Simons) in a Charleston County school board race. Whipper was co-chair of the Blue Ribbon Education Committee, a group that opposed the incumbents from getting reelected. To Whipper, the incumbent school board members (Lurline Fishburne, Ray Toler, Robin Beard, and Arthur Ravenel) threatened the future of Charleston education because they were far more concerned with politics than children's education.

In addition, Whipper was also a supporter of the Circle of Influence Leadership Summit that occurred in December 2007. This summit, which was sponsored by AARP South Carolina, was an opportunity for black women to come together and find a way to solve social problems that persist in their communities. Whipper hoped that this summit would address the decrease in black women officeholders and put more black women in office. This, to Whipper, was important because of the unique perspective black women bring to politics.

== Death ==
Lucille Whipper died on Friday, August 27, 2021. Her son, Seth Whipper, said there was no underlying cause for her death. Her funeral was held on Friday, September 3, 2021, at Grace Funeral Services, located at 1947 Highway 52, Moncks Corner, SC 29461. At the time of her death, Whipper had 19 grandchildren, 23 great-grandchildren, and 26 great-great-grandchildren.
