= Bob Wood =

Bob Wood may refer to:

== Entertainment ==
- Bob Wood (comics) (1917–1966), comic book artist during the Golden Age of Comics
- Bob Wood (author) (born 1957), author of Dodger Dogs to Fenway Franks and Big Ten Country

== Politics ==
- Bob Wood (MP) (1940–2025), Liberal Member of Parliament for Nipissing in the Canadian House of Commons, 1988–2004
- Bob Wood (Ontario MPP) (born 1949), Progressive Conservative Member of Provincial Parliament for London South and London West in the Legislative Assembly of Ontario, 1995–2003

== Sports ==
- Bob Wood (baseball) (1865–1943), Major League Baseball catcher
- Bob Wood (basketball) (1921–2014), National Basketball Association player
- Bob Wood (ice hockey) (1930–2007), ice hockey player in the National Hockey League

== See also ==
- Bob Woods (disambiguation)
- Bobby Wood (disambiguation)
- Robert Wood (disambiguation)
