= Cato Conspiracy =

Cato Conspiracy may refer to:

- Cato Street Conspiracy, an 1820 assassination attempt on all British cabinet ministers and Prime Minister Lord Liverpool
- Stono Rebellion, or Cato's Conspiracy, a 1739 slave uprising in the American colony of South Carolina
