= Wilkinson-Boineau House =

Historic house in South Carolina, United States

- U.S. National Register of Historic Places
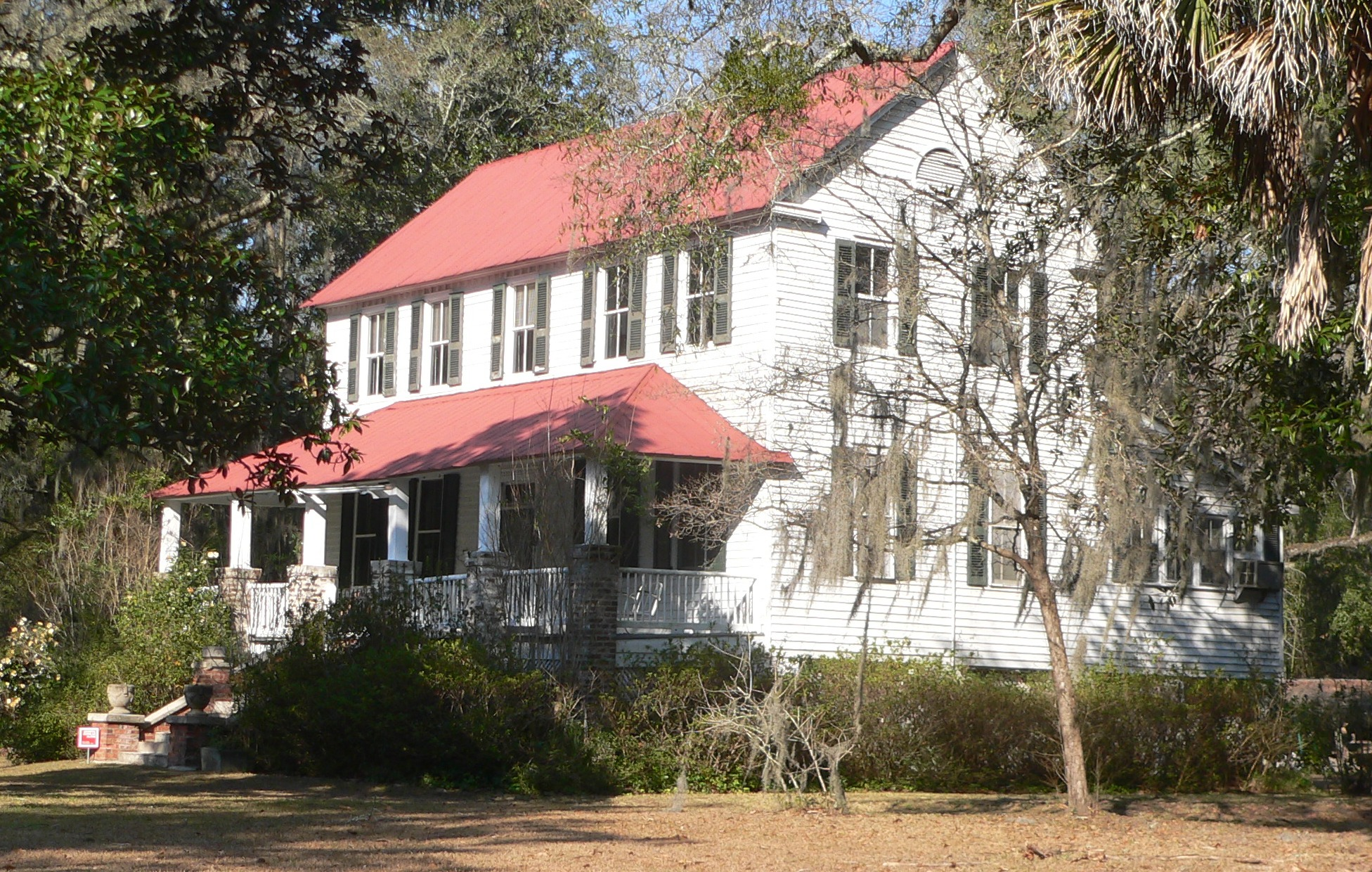
- Wilkinson-Boineau House

- Location within South Carolina Location within the United States
- Location: 5185 South Carolina Highway 174, Adams Run, South Carolina
- Coordinates: 32°43′10″N 80°20′57″W
- Architectural style: Greek Revival
- NRHP reference No.: 98001644

The Wilkinson-Boineau House is a significant example of an early 19th-century Greek Revival residence with minor 20th-century alterations. William Wilkinson, a planter, established a village, Wilkinsonville, about 1830 that bears his name, and the house was the first one built.

Milton Carroll Boineau brought the land in the 1920s. In the 1930s, the family built a one-story addition on the back and removed part of the central hall. The house is on tall brick piers. The original part was a two-story central hall house. A hip-roofed porch along the entire front is accessed by a brick staircase. The house has square edge weatherboarding and a tall lateral gable roof.

The house was added to the National Register of Historic Places January 21, 1999.
