= List of schools in Charleston, South Carolina =

This is a list of schools in Charleston, South Carolina.

== Elementary schools ==
- Angel Oak Primary (K-1)
- Ashley River Elementary School
- Buist Academy - CCSD
- Cane Bay Elementary School
- Charles Pinckney Elementary School - CCSD
- Charleston Dev. Academy
- Charleston Progressive
- Charlestowne Academy
- Drayton Hall Elementary School
- E.B. Ellington Elementary School
- Fraser Elementary School
- Harbor View Elementary School
- James Island Elementary School - CCSD
- James Simons Elementary School
- Johns Island Elementary School - CCSD
- Memminger Elementary School - CCSD
- Minnie Hughes Elementary School
- Mitchell Elementary School
- Montessori Program
- Murray-LaSaine Elementary School
- Orange Grove Elementary School
- Pepperhill Elementary School
- Sanders-Clyde Elementary School
- St. Andrews
- St. James-Santee - CCSD
- Springfield Elementary School
- Stiles Point Elementary School
- Stono Park Elementary School
- West Ashley Int

== Middle schools ==
- Buist Academy - CCSD
- C.E. Williams Middle School
- Charleston Charter School for Math & Science
- Charleston Progressive
- Charlestowne Academy
- Discipline School
- Fort Johnson Middle School
- Haut Gap Middle School
- James Island Middle School
- Moultrie Middle School - CCSD
- Palmetto Scholars Academy
- West Ashley Middle School - CCSD

== High schools ==
- Allegro Charter School of Music
- Burke High School
- Charleston Charter for Math and Science
- Charleston County School of the Arts
- James Island Charter High School/IB at JICHS
- Wando High School
- West Ashley High School - CCSD

== Private schools ==
- Addlestone Hebrew Academy (PK-8)
- Ashley Hall (PK-12)
- Bishop England High School (9-12) - Diocese of Charleston
- Blessed Sacrament (6-8) - Diocese of Charleston
- The Charleston Catholic School (K-8)
- Charleston Day School (K-8)
- First Baptist Church School (PK-12)
- James Island Christian School (K-12)
- Mason Preparatory School (K-8)
- Nativity School (PK-8)
- Porter-Gaud School (PK-12)

== Higher education ==
- The American College of the Building Arts
- The Citadel
- College of Charleston
- Charleston School of Law
- Medical University of South Carolina
- Charleston Southern University
- Roper Hospital School of Practical Nursing
- Trident Technical College, small satellite campus

== Former schools ==
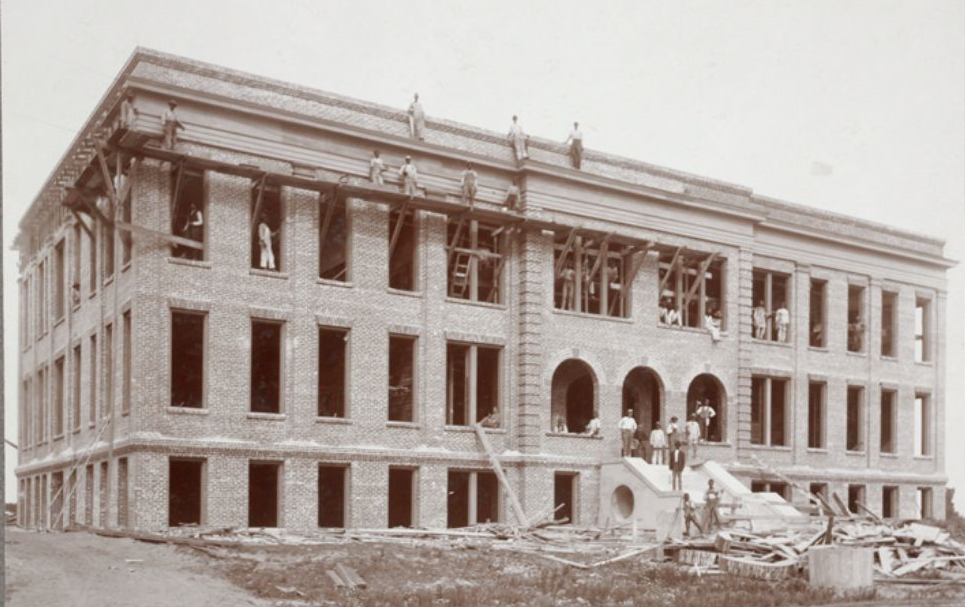
The Industrial Training School of Charleston, SC (shown under construction in 1910)

- Industrial Training School of Charleston, also called Colored School of Charleston
- Avery Normal Institute, now the Avery Research Center for African American History and Culture
- Memminger Normal School, now established as Memminger Elementary School
