= Dodger Dogs to Fenway Franks =

Baseball book by Bob Wood

Dodger Dogs to Fenway Franks: And All the Wieners In Between
- Author: Bob Wood
- Language: English
- Publisher: McGraw-Hill
- Publication date: 1988
- Publication place: United States
- Media type: Print
- Followed by: Big Ten Country: A Journey Through One Football Season

Dodger Dogs to Fenway Franks: And All the Wieners In Between is a 1988 book by Bob Wood. It was published by McGraw-Hill and covers Wood's trip to all 26 Major League Baseball (at the time) stadiums in one summer.

== Synopsis ==
In 1985 the then-28-year-old Wood was a high school history teacher in Seattle, when he took a trip to all 26 Major League Baseball stadiums in one summer. The trip was inspired by a conversation he had with another spectator at a 1977 game at Comiskey Park in Chicago. To save money he would often sleep at Kampgrounds of America or Motel 6. Wood additionally sold his Ford Pinto and bought a 1985 Toyota Tercel for its good fuel mileage and reliability.

Wood decided to assign a letter grade in each of eight categories and rank the stadiums from best to worst. Dodger Stadium in Los Angeles and Royals Stadium in Kansas City tied for first while the Astrodome in Houston and Exhibition Stadium in Toronto finished as joint worst.

=== Itinerary ===
Dodger Dogs to Fenway Franks is arranged in chronological order of Wood's visit to each stadium.

1. Kingdome, Seattle: June 16.
2. Candlestick Park, San Francisco: June 19.
3. Oakland Coliseum, Oakland: June 21.
4. Dodger Stadium, Los Angeles: June 23.
5. Anaheim Stadium, Anaheim: June 24.
6. Jack Murphy Stadium, San Diego: June 26 and 27.
7. Arlington Stadium, Arlington, Texas: July 2 and 3.
8. Astrodome, Houston: July 4.
9. Royals Stadium, Kansas City: July 6.
10. Busch Memorial Stadium, St. Louis: July 7.
11. Wrigley Field, Chicago: July 9 and 10.
12. Hubert H. Humphrey Metrodome, Minneapolis: July 16 (All-Star Game).
13. Milwaukee County Stadium, Milwaukee: July 18.
14. Comiskey Park, Chicago: July 19.
15. Riverfront Stadium, Cincinnati: July 20.
16. Tiger Stadium, Detroit: July 21.
17. Exhibition Stadium, Toronto: July 23.
18. Olympic Stadium, Montreal: July 24.
19. Fenway Park, Boston: July 26 and 27.
20. Veterans Stadium, Philadelphia: July 28.
21. Baltimore Memorial Stadium, Baltimore: July 29 and 30.
22. Shea Stadium, New York City: July 31.
23. Yankee Stadium, New York City: August 1.
24. Three Rivers Stadium, Pittsburgh: August 3.
25. Cleveland Municipal Stadium, Cleveland: August 4.
26. Fulton County Stadium, Atlanta: August 5.

== Reception ==
The Chicago Tribune called the work a "plumply loving and impressionistic look at the romping grounds of the demigods of the national pastime." In his book 501 Baseball Books Fans Must Read Before They Die, Ron Kaplan noted that while most of the stadiums in Dodger Dogs to Fenway Franks are no longer in business, the work "evokes a lot of memories and Dodger Dogs serves as a guide for future customer-service business models."

A story by James Crabtree about the 20th anniversary of Dodger Dogs to Fenway Franks was published by Baseball Musings in 2008.

== See also ==
- Dodger Dog
