= King Cemetery =

Historic site in Charleston County, South Carolina, US

- U.S. National Register of Historic Places
- Location within South Carolina Location within the United States
- Location: 1.1 miles northeast of the junction of U.S. Route 17 and S-19-38, near Adams Run, South Carolina
- Coordinates: 32°46′10″N 80°22′51″W
- Area: 2.8 acres (1.1 ha)
- NRHP reference No.: 00000586
- Added to NRHP: June 13, 2000

King Cemetery (38CH1590) is a historic African American cemetery near Adams Run, Charleston County, South Carolina, containing at least 183 graves. Oral history documents the extensive use of the graveyard during slavery and continuing into the first half of the 20th century. Distinctive characteristics include the placement of grave goods, ranging from ceramics to bottles to household furniture, on the grave and the use of plant materials as markers.

The cemetery was listed on the National Register of Historic Places in 2000.
