= Baptist Hill High School =

Public high school in Hollywood, South Carolina, United States

Location
- 5117 Baptist Hill Road; Hollywood, South Carolina; United States
- Coordinates: 32.7279°N 80.2619°W

Information
- Other name: Baptist Hill Middle High School
- Type: Public Middle High School
- Established: 1948
- School district: Charleston County School District
- NCES School ID: 450144000250
- Principal: Brendan Glaze
- Teaching staff: 54.00
- Grades: 6–12
- Enrollment: 508 (2023–24)
- Student to teacher ratio: 9.41
- Colors: Maroon and gray
- Sports: Football; Cross country; Basketball; Wrestling; Softball; Baseball; Track
- Mascot: Bobcat
- Website: www.ccsdschools.com/baptisthill

Baptist Hill High School is a public high school in Hollywood, South Carolina. It is part of the Charleston County School District. Most of its students are African American. Bobcats are the school mascot.

The school was built circa 1953 at a cost of approximately $250,000. In 1954, Jet reported that a janitor at the school's new cement block building believed it was haunted by a student who drowned before receiving a diploma. In 1977, the school was set on fire, causing $125,000 in damage.

In 2017, the school's football team played for a state championship.

The school district launched a cultural competency program to address much lower scores among African American and Hispanic students than white students at its largely segregated schools.
