= Academic Magnet High School =

Location
- 5109-A West Enterprise Street; North Charleston, South Carolina 29405; United States; 32°53′09″N 80°00′00″W

Information
- Type: Public magnet high school
- Motto: Eruditio et Honor (Scholarship and honor)
- Established: 1988 (38 years ago)
- School district: Charleston County School District
- CEEB code: 410356
- Principal: Jacob Perlmutter
- Teaching staff: 43.00 (FTE)
- Enrollment: 718 (2023–2024)
- Student to teacher ratio: 16.70
- Colors: Hunter green and black
- Mascot: Remy the Raptor
- Nickname: Raptors
- Newspaper: The Talon
- Yearbook: Carpe Diem
- Website: amhs.ccsdschools.com

Academic Magnet High School (AMHS) is a high school (grades 9–12) in North Charleston, South Carolina, United States. The school enrolls students through an admissions process based on middle school grades, test scores, teacher recommendations, and a written essay.

== History ==
Academic Magnet High School was established in 1988 and the first class graduated in 1992. The school was originally located as a separate sub-campus of Burke High School in downtown Charleston. It then moved to the Charleston Naval Base, where it stayed until 2010, when it moved to the newly built Bonds Wilson campus on the site of the old Bonds-Wilson High School in North Charleston, South Carolina. Academic Magnet shares a campus with the Charleston County School of the Arts middle and high schools. The new campus is part of an effort by the Charleston County School District to upgrade its facilities. In December 2018, the school changed its motto from "seriously smart" to "eruditio et honor" (scholarship and honor) due to a movement led by a student council member.

== Students ==
The school's SAT scores were the second-best in the state for the 2003–2004 year, surpassed only by the South Carolina Governor's School for Science and Mathematics.

Academic Magnet is composed of students who reside in Charleston County and of students who own property in Charleston County. The school is located in Charleston County School District 4.

== Curriculum ==
To graduate, students are required to fulfill a 90-hour service requirement, take (and pass) at least four Advanced Placement (AP) courses throughout their high school career, and complete AP Research and AP Seminar, as a replacement to the formerly used senior thesis.

== Recognition ==
In the May 19, 2008 Newsweek cover story, Academic Magnet High School was ranked 7th among national public high schools based on an index consisting of the quotient of AP exams taken by all students and the quantity and quality of graduating seniors. In 2013, it was recognized by U.S. News & World Report as the 7th best high school in the nation.

In April 2019, U.S. News & World Report recognized Academic Magnet High School as the best high school in the nation. The school was ranked number one among more than 17,000 public high schools. In April 2020, April 2021, and April 2022, U.S. News & World Report recognized Academic Magnet High School as the second best high school in the nation.

In fall 2023, U.S. News & World Report continued to recognize Academic Magnet High School as one of the top public schools in the nation, ranked number seven among almost 20,000 public high schools.

== Faculty ==
Judith Peterson served as principal from the school’s founding until the end of the academic year in July 2003. Carol Tempel served as principal from July 2003 to July 2004 with Peterson returning after Tempel's departure. Peterson was succeeded by Catherine Spencer who was principal from July 2017 to June 2021. The current principal is Jacob Perlmutter who is an alumnus of Academic Magnet.

== Sports ==
The school has won 18 SCHSL state championships, including five championships in the 2013–14 school year alone. The football team achieved its first ever winning record (6–5) in the 2012 season. In October 2013, the Raptors' men's swim team became the first sports team from AMHS to win back-to-back SCHSL state titles, a feat later outdone by the women's soccer team in 2013–15. In addition to team success, AMHS has had individual state champions in men's and women's cross country and track, men's and women's swimming, and wrestling, and has sent many student-athletes on to compete at the collegiate level.

- Baseball (men's varsity & JV): 2016–17 National Champions
- Cross country (men's): 2006, 2007, 2008 A State runners-up, 2012 AA State runners-up, 2013 AA State Champions
- Football: 2012 first-ever winning record (6-5)
- Golf (men's): 2010 A State Champions
- Sailing: 2011, 2013, 2014 State Champions, 2012 State runners-up
- Soccer (men's): 2008, 2009, 2010 A State runners-up, 2012, 2014, 2015, 2017, 2018, 2025, 2026 AA State Champions
- Soccer (women's): 2011, 2013, 2014 AA State Champions, 2012 AA State runners-up
- Swimming (men's): 2004, 2010, 2011, 2014, 2015 AAA-AA-A State runners-up, 2012, 2013 AAA-AA-A State Champions
- Swimming (women's): 2013 AAA-AA-A State runners-up 2014 AAA-AA-A State runners-up, 2015 AAA-AA-A State Champions 2016 AAA-AA-A State Champions
- Tennis (men's): 2016 AA State Champions

=== State Champion teams ===
- Cross country (men's): 2013
- Cross country (women's): 2014
- Golf (men's): 2010
- Sailing: 2011, 2013, 2014
- Soccer (men's): 2012, 2014, 2015, 2017, 2018, 2025, 2026
- Soccer (women's): 2011, 2013, 2014, 2015, 2017, 2018, 2025, 2026
- Swimming (men's): 2012, 2013
- Swimming (women's): 2015, 2016
- Tennis (men's): 2016
- Tennis (women's):2025

== Notable alumni ==
- Muhiyidin Moye, Black Lives Matter activist
- Spencer Wetmore, state legislator
- Andrew Novak, professional golfer
- Nafees Bin Zafar, Principal Engineer for DreamWorks Animation
