= Towles Farmstead =

Historic house in South Carolina, United States

- U.S. National Register of Historic Places
- U.S. Historic district
- Location within South Carolina Location within the United States
- Nearest city: 4595 and 4611 Towles Rd, near Meggett, South Carolina
- Coordinates: 32°43′14″N 80°11′06″W
- Area: 15 acres (6.1 ha)
- Built: c. 1910
- Architectural style: Colonial Revival, Classical Revival
- NRHP reference No.: 93001513
- Added to NRHP: January 21, 1994

Towles Farmstead, also known as Goshen Plantation and Plainsfield, is a historic farmstead and national historic district located near Meggett, Charleston County, South Carolina. The district encompasses 11 contributing buildings, 2 contributing sites, and 1 contributing structure. They include two early-20th century residences: a one-story, frame house constructed about 1903, with characteristic Neo-Classical and Bungalow features; and a two-story, rectangular frame house constructed in 1930, with characteristic Colonial Revival and Italian Renaissance features. Associated with the houses are a variety of contributing utility outbuildings.

It was listed on the National Register of Historic Places in 1994.
