= Robert Woods =

Robert or Bob Woods may refer to:

== Entertainment ==
- Robert Woods (actor) (born 1936), American actor in European films
- Robert S. Woods (born 1948), American actor
- Robert Woods (producer), classical music producer

== Sports ==
=== American football ===
- Robert Woods (offensive tackle) (born 1950), American football offensive lineman
- Robert Woods (wide receiver, born 1992), American football wide receiver in the 2010s and 2020s
- Robert Woods (wide receiver, born 1955), American football wide receiver in the 1970s

=== Other sports ===
- Robert Woods (cyclist) (born 1968), Australian mountain bike racer
- Bob Woods (curler) (born 1933), Canadian-Swedish curler
- Bob Woods (ice hockey), Canadian ice hockey coach and player

== Other ==
- Robert Woods (surgeon) (1865–1938), Irish surgeon, UK MP 1918–1922
- Robert Carr Woods (1816–1875), lawyer and editor of The Straits Times
- Robert John Woods (1859–1944), Ontario farmer and political figure
- Robert Wilmer Woods or Robin Woods (1914–1997), English Anglican bishop
- Bob Woods (politician) (born 1947), Australian former politician
- Robert Roosevelt Woods, (1936-2002), member of the South Carolina House of Representatives

== See also ==
- Robert Wood (disambiguation)
