= South Carolina Highway 174 =

State highway in South Carolina, United States

South Carolina Highway 174
- Edisto Island National Scenic Byway

Route information
- Maintained by SCDOT
- Length: 25.730 mi (41.408 km)
- Existed: 1940s–present
- Tourist routes: Edisto Island National Scenic Byway

Major junctions
- South end: Docksite Road in Edisto Beach
- North end: US 17 in Osborn

Location
- Country: United States
- State: South Carolina
- Counties: Colleton, Charleston

Highway system
- South Carolina State Highway System; Interstate; US; State; Scenic
← SC 173	→ US 176

South Carolina Highway 174 (SC 174) is a 25.730-mile (41.408 km) state highway, connecting Edisto Beach with the western part of the Charleston area, in the southeastern part of the U.S. state of South Carolina. The highway was designated a South Carolina scenic byway in 1988. In 2009, the U.S. Department of Transportation declared that a 17-mile (27 km) stretch of SC 174 on Edisto Island would be designated as a National Scenic Byway. According to the South Carolina Department of Transportation (SCDOT), the southern terminus is at the southern terminus of Yacht Club Road, where Palmetto Boulevard changes name to Dock Site Road. However, the signed southern terminus is at an intersection with Dock Site Road and the western terminus of Buoy Road, approximately 1,112 feet (339 m) to the northeast.

== Route description ==
SC 174 travels generally in a south-to-north direction. Its official southern terminus is located in Edisto Beach in Colleton County at the intersection of Dock Site Road, Palmetto Boulevard, and Yacht Club Road, although its signed southern terminus is located about a quarter-mile east at the intersection of Buoy Road and Dock Site Road. From its southern terminus, SC 174 travels south before curving east along the beach and traveling through the length of Edisto Beach. This is the only section of SC 174 that has four lanes. As SC 174 leaves Edisto Beach, it also enters Charleston County and curves north, beginning its designation as the Edisto Island National Scenic Byway.

As the highway runs across Edisto Island, it travels under an ancient live oak canopy and past small homes, prayer chapels, churches, and country stores and serves as the primary spine road for the island, with smaller country roads and lanes intersecting it and leading to more distant areas of the island. SC 174's National Scenic Byway designation ends when it crosses the North Edisto River and leaves Edisto Island. Further north, the highway intersects with the western terminus of SC 164 and then running through the unincorporated community of Adams Run, where it intersects with the western terminus of SC 162. Continuing north, SC 174 crosses the CSX Railway just before its northern terminus, an intersection with US 17 in the unincorporated community of Osborn.

== Major intersections ==
County	Location	mi	km	Destinations	Notes
Colleton	Edisto Beach			Dock Site Road east / Buoy Road east	Signed southern terminus of SC 174; western terminus of Buoy Road; Dock Site Road continues past intersection.
Colleton	Edisto Beach	0.000	0.000	Palmetto Boulevard ends / Yacht Club Road north / Dock Site Road east	Official southern terminus of SC 174; southern terminus of Yacht Club Road; roadway continues as Dock Site Road.
Charleston		22.060	35.502	SC 164 east / Willtown Road – Hollywood, Charleston, ACE Basin NWA	Western terminus of SC 164
Charleston	Adams Run	23.130	37.224	SC 162 east – Hollywood	Western terminus of SC 162
Charleston	Osborn	25.730	41.408	US 17 (Savannah Highway) – Jacksonboro, Charleston	Northern terminus
1.000 mi = 1.609 km; 1.000 km = 0.621 mi
