= Dodger Dog =

Hot dog served by the Los Angeles Dodgers

The Dodger Dog
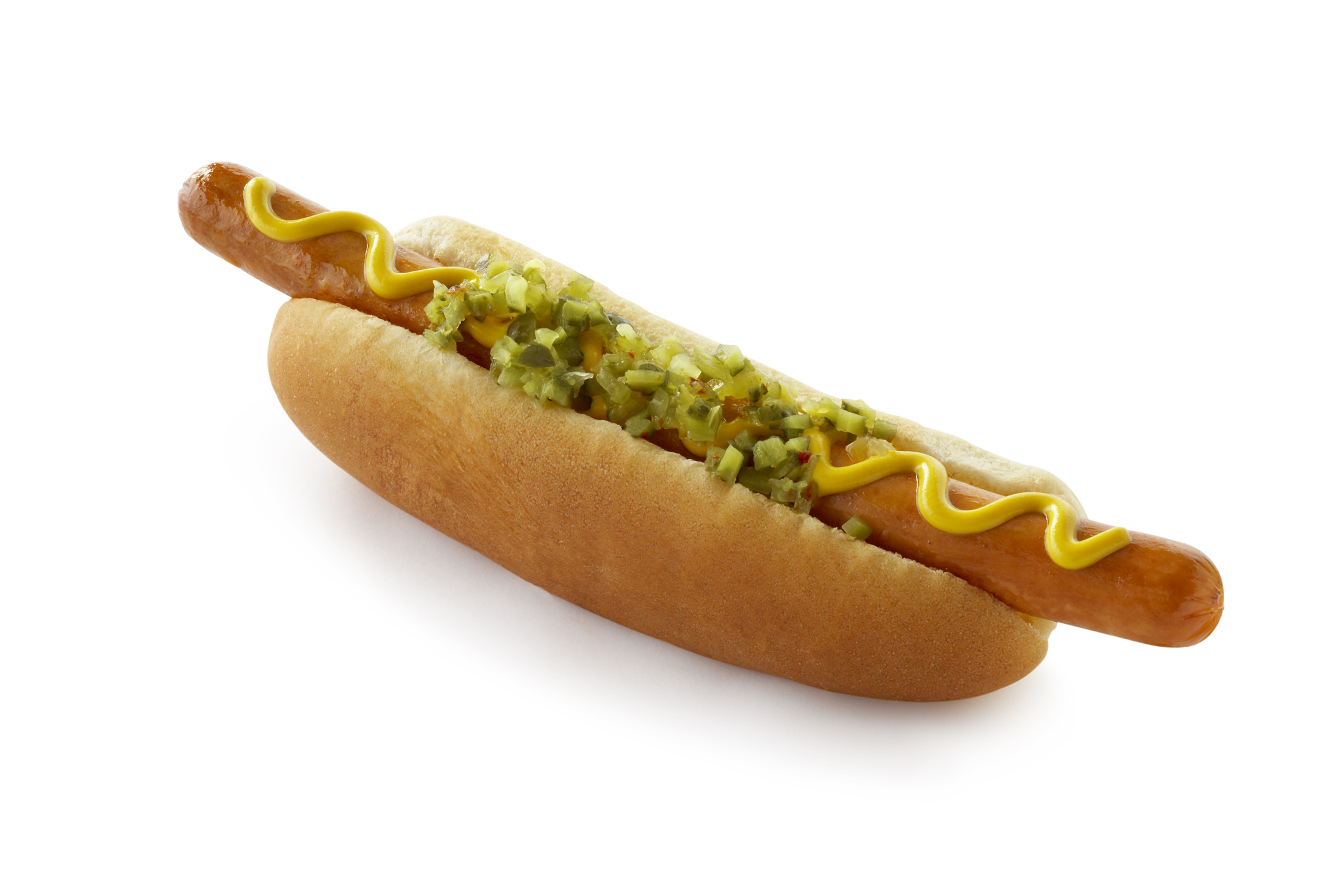
- The Dodger Dog
- Course: Lunch or snack
- Place of origin: United States
- Region or state: Los Angeles; 34.07239°N 118.23933°W
- Created by: Thomas Arthur
- Serving temperature: Hot
- Main ingredients: Hot dog, hot dog bun
- Ingredients generally used: ketchup, mustard, chopped onions, sweet relish
- Variations: Doyer Dog

The Dodger Dog is a hot dog named after the Major League Baseball franchise that sells them, the Los Angeles Dodgers. It is a 10-inch pork wiener wrapped in a steamed bun. The hot dog is sold at Dodger Stadium located in Los Angeles, California. According to the National Hot Dog and Sausage Council, the projected number of 2011 season hot dogs sold at Dodger Stadium was 2 million, establishing Dodger Dogs as the leader in hot dog sales of all those sold in Major League Baseball ballparks.

There are two lines for Dodger Dog vendors: steamed or grilled. The vendors of the grilled dogs are typically located near the back wall of the stadium, so that the smoke does not blow into the seating areas and overwhelm the baseball fans. The grilled Dogs are considered the "classic" version. Until 2021, they were known as "Farmer John Dodger Dogs". Starting with the 2021 MLB Los Angeles Dodgers season, the iconic "Dodger Dog" is being supplied to Dodger Stadium by Vernon, California-based Papa Cantella's.

== Background ==
The Dodger Dog is also available in the "Super Dodger Dog" variation, which is made of 100% beef as opposed to 100% pork. It is believed that Dodger Dogs were first called "Dodger Dogs" in 1958 when the Dodgers first came to Los Angeles from Brooklyn. The Dodger Dogs that are now sold to the public in Southern California supermarkets are made by Papa Cantella's, a southern California sausage maker. In 2011, the Dodgers introduced a Mexican-themed "Doyer Dog" which are made with chili, salsa, jalapeños, and condiments replacing the standard ketchup and mustard on a typical hot dog.

A Dodger Dog is also served at Chickasaw Bricktown Ballpark in Oklahoma City, Oklahoma, the home of the Dodgers' AAA affiliate Oklahoma City Comets. A concession area called the "Dog Pound" serves hot dogs from stadiums around the country including the Fenway Frank, Cincinnati Cheese Coney, Milwaukee Brat, and The Red Hot Chicago Dog. The Dodger Dog was not, however, served at the Dodgers' spring training ballpark, Camelback Ranch, during the team's first spring training at the park. This was changed for the 2010 Spring Training season where the Dodger Dog was either cooked on a hot dog roller or steamed.

== Creator ==
The "Dodger Dog" was created by Thomas Arthur, who worked for 29 years (1962–1991) as the food concessions manager at Dodger Stadium. Originally, the 10-inch dog was sold as a "Foot Long", but Thomas Arthur decided truth in advertising was the best path. He approached Walter O'Malley, majority owner of the Dodgers, and asked if the Hot Dog could be called the "Dodger Dog". It became such a staple for Dodger fans that actor Vincent Price described its deliciousness in his cookbook, Treasury of Great Recipes. The 10-inch wiener was originally made by the Morrell Meat Company, but Farmer John, one of the Dodgers' chief sponsors, soon took over the hot dog needs of the stadium. Farmer John was purchased by Hormel in 2004. Farmer John was purchased from Hormel by Smithfield Foods in 2017. In 2021, Smithfield and the Dodgers could not agree on a new contract, and the name Farmer John was removed from the product.

== See also ==
- List of hot dogs
- Dodger Dogs to Fenway Franks
