= Robert Wood =

Robert Wood may refer to:

== Arts and entertainment ==
- Robert William Wood (1889–1979), American landscape artist
- Robert Wood (artist) (fl. 1900s), British artist, accused and acquitted of the Camden Town murder
- Robert Wood (television executive) (1925–1986), American television executive
- Robert E. Wood (painter) (born 1971), Canadian landscape artist

== Military ==
- Robert Crooke Wood (1799–1869), American general, military physician and neurologist
- Robert B. Wood (1836–1878), American Civil War sailor and Medal of Honor recipient
- Robert E. Wood (1879–1969), American soldier and businessman
- Robert J. Wood (1905–1986), U.S. Army general
- Robert S. Wood (born 1936), American military leader and Mormon leader

== Politics ==
- Sir Robert Wood (mayor) (fl. 1570s), English politician, mayor of Norwich
- Robert Wood (antiquarian) (1717–1771), English civil servant and politician
- Robert H. Wood (1844–?), African American mayor in Natchez, Mississippi and the first in the United States
- Robert Wood (American politician) (1885–1964), American politician, Wisconsin state assemblyman
- Robert James Wood (1886–1954), Canadian politician, member of the House of Commons
- Robert Wood (Australian politician) (born 1949), British-born Australian politician, senator for New South Wales
- Robert A. Wood, American diplomat

== Science and medicine ==
- Robert Wood (mathematician) (1622–1685), English mathematician
- Robert W. Wood (1868–1955), American physicist and writer
- Robert Wood (psychologist) (born 1941), British psychologist and writer
- Robert Wood (roboticist), Harvard University professor and innovator in robotics
- Robert Wood (atmospheric scientist), British-American atmospheric scientist

== Sports ==
- Robert Wood (rugby, born 1872) (1872–1928), English rugby union and rugby league player who played in the 1890s
- Robert Wood (rugby union, born 1873) (1873–1950), English international rugby union player
- Robert Wood (coach) (1887–1949), American college football coach and mayor of Athens, Ohio
- Robert Wood (sailor) (1926–2004), American Olympic sailor
- Robert Wood (rugby union, born 1948), Australian rugby union player

== Other ==
- Robert Wood (timber merchant) (1792–1847), Canadian shipowner, claimed to be the son of Prince Edward Augustus of the U.K.
- Robert Stanford Wood (1886–1963), English civil servant and educational administrator
- Robert Coldwell Wood (1923–2005), American political scientist and academic
- Robert Watson Wood (1923–2018), American clergyman, LGBT rights activist, and author

== See also ==
- Bob Wood (disambiguation)
- Bobby Wood (disambiguation)
- Robert Wood Johnson (disambiguation)
- Robert Woods (disambiguation)
