= Meggett, South Carolina =

- Town
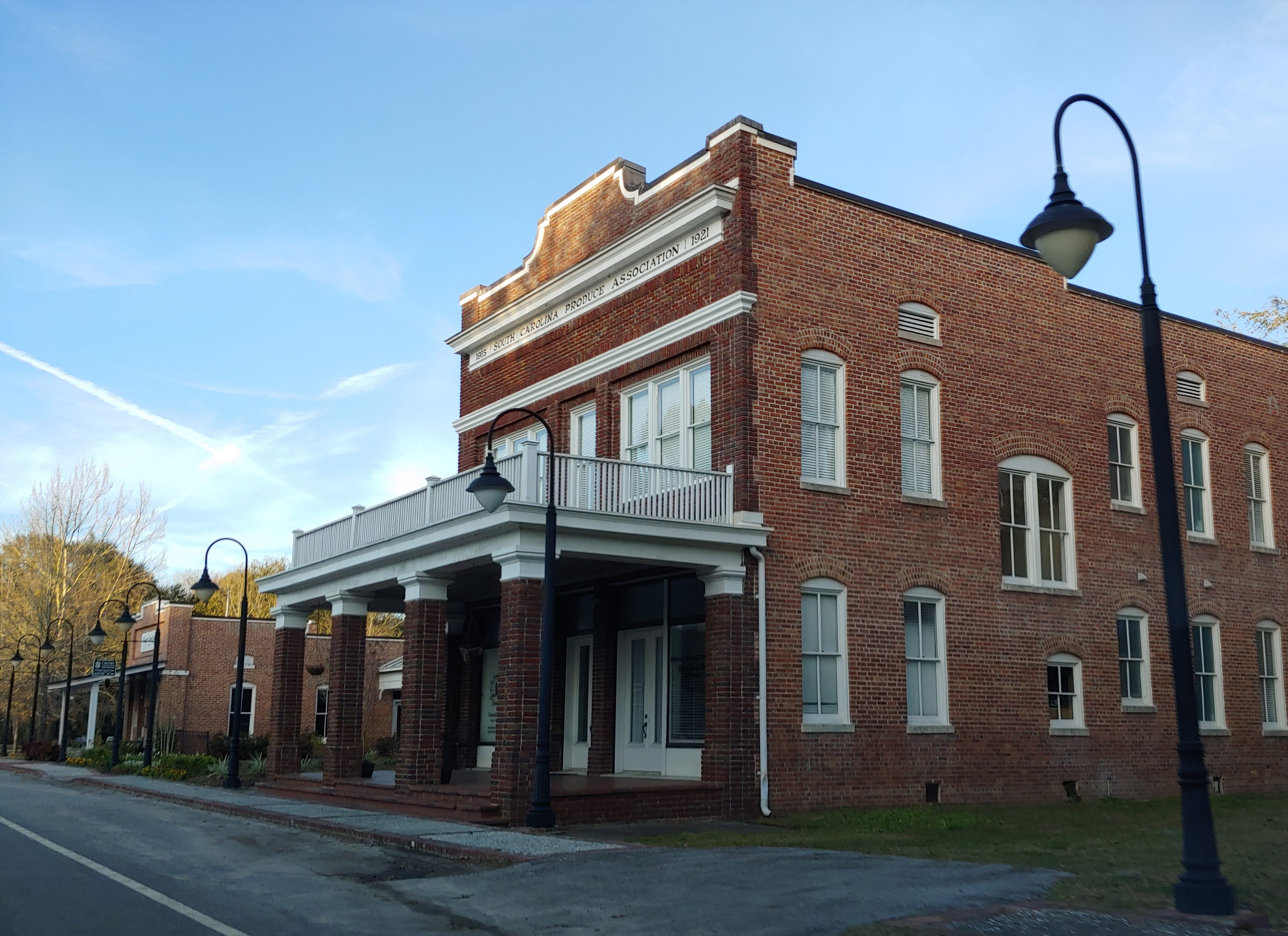
- South Carolina Produce Associate Building in Meggett, SC

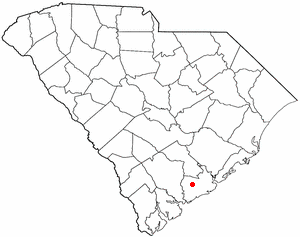
- Location of Meggett in South Carolina
- Coordinates: 32°42′20″N 80°14′27″W
- Country: United States
- State: South Carolina
- County: Charleston

Area
  - Total: 18.76 sq mi (48.59 km^{2})
  - Land: 18.14 sq mi (46.99 km^{2})
  - Water: 0.62 sq mi (1.61 km^{2})
- Elevation: 16 ft (4.9 m)

Population (2020)
  - Total: 1,390
  - Density: 76.6/sq mi (29.58/km^{2})
- Time zone: UTC-5 (EST)
  - Summer (DST): UTC-4 (EDT)
- ZIP code: 29449
- Area codes: 843, 854
- FIPS code: 45-45790
- GNIS feature ID: 2406141
- Website: www.townofmeggettsc.org

Meggett is a town in Charleston County, South Carolina, United States. The population was 1,226 at the 2010 census. Meggett is part of the Charleston-North Charleston-Summerville metropolitan area.

== History ==
The Towles Farmstead was listed on the National Register of Historic Places in 1994.

== Geography ==
Meggett is located in southwestern Charleston County. It is bordered to the north by the town of Hollywood. The traditional center of Meggett is along South Carolina Highway 165, 1.5 miles (2.4 km) south of the center of Hollywood and 2.5 miles (4.0 km) north of the highway's end at Yonges Island. The Meggett town limits have expanded east as far as the Stono River and west beyond Toogoodoo Creek as far as South Carolina Highway 174. To the south the town extends as far as Yonges Island next to the Wadmalaw River.

According to the United States Census Bureau, Meggett has a total area of 18.4 square miles (47.7 km^{2}), of which 17.8 square miles (46.2 km^{2}) is land and 0.58 square miles (1.5 km^{2}), or 3.11%, is water. The town area has increased from a total of 14.8 square miles (38.4 km^{2}) in 2000.

== Demographics ==
Historical population
Census	Pop.	Note	%±
1950	224		—
1960	188		−16.1%
1970	180		−4.3%
1980	249		38.3%
1990	787		216.1%
2000	1,230		56.3%
2010	1,226		−0.3%
2020	1,390		13.4%
U.S. Decennial Census

=== 2020 census ===
Meggett racial composition
Race	Num.	Perc.
White (non-Hispanic)	1,200	86.33%
Black or African American (non-Hispanic)	112	8.06%
Native American	2	0.14%
Asian	10	0.72%
Other/Mixed	33	2.37%
Hispanic or Latino	33	2.37%

As of the 2020 United States census, there were 1,390 people, 498 households, and 325 families residing in the town.

=== 2000 census ===
As of the census of 2000, there were 1,230 people, 484 households, and 377 families residing in the town. The population density was 84.4 inhabitants per square mile (32.6/km^{2}). There were 540 housing units at an average density of 37.1 per square mile (14.3/km^{2}). The racial makeup of the town was 78.78% White, 20.24% African American, 0.41% Native American, 0.08% Asian, and 0.49% from two or more races. Hispanic or Latino of any race were 0.57% of the population.

There were 484 households, out of which 28.3% had children under the age of 18 living with them, 67.8% were married couples living together, 6.8% had a female householder with no husband present, and 22.1% were non-families. 18.8% of all households were made up of individuals, and 8.5% had someone living alone who was 65 years of age or older. The average household size was 2.54 and the average family size was 2.90.

In the town, the population was spread out, with 21.5% under the age of 18, 5.9% from 18 to 24, 25.5% from 25 to 44, 33.5% from 45 to 64, and 13.7% who were 65 years of age or older. The median age was 44 years. For every 100 females, there were 105.3 males. For every 100 females age 18 and over, there were 103.8 males.

The median income for a household in the town was $45,809, and the median income for a family was $51,667. Males had a median income of $36,563 versus $26,375 for females. The per capita income for the town was $22,906. About 6.0% of families and 9.3% of the population were below the poverty line, including 10.8% of those under age 18 and 10.7% of those age 65 or over.

== Government ==
The town is run by an elected mayor–council government system. The mayor is Harry V. "Buster" Herrington III, and the council members are Tommy Butler (Mayor Pro Tem), Keith McCarty, Tom Hutto, and Angela Watts.
