= Summit Plantation House =

Historic house in South Carolina, United States

- U.S. National Register of Historic Places
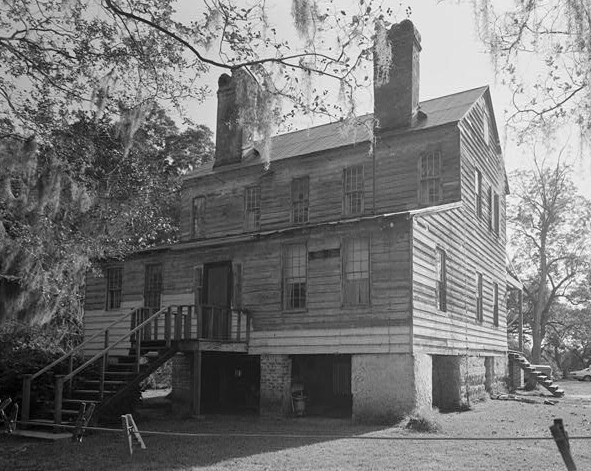

- Location within South Carolina Location within the United States
- Location: Adams Run, South Carolina
- Coordinates: 32°41′37″N 80°17′10″W
- Built: 1819
- Architectural style: Greek Revival
- NRHP reference No.: 83002188
- Added to NRHP: July 28, 1983

The Summit Plantation House is an historic building in Adams Run, South Carolina, USA. The house was built for William and Amarinthia Wilkinson in 1819. The house was listed in the National Register on July 28, 1983.
