= Bonds-Wilson High School =

Location
- Coordinates: 32.884597°N 80.00092°W

Information
- Type: Public, segregated (until 1971)
- Opened: 1950
- Closed: 1985
- Last updated: December 30, 2017

Bonds-Wilson High School was a high school open from 1950 to 1985 in the predominantly African-American community of Liberty Hill in North Charleston, South Carolina, United States. The school's campus became part of a 1950s project to build mostly African-American schools in South Carolina.

The school was integrated in 1971 and included students from surrounding neighborhoods, as well as mostly white students bused from the nearby Charleston Air Force Base.

The school closed in 1985, and students who would have attended it were sent to North Charleston High School instead. It has since been demolished. The site has now been renamed Bonds-Wilson Campus which houses the Charleston County School of the Arts and Academic Magnet High School.

Jazz musician Alphonse Mouzon and NFL player/head coach Art Shell attended Bonds-Wilson. Lonnie Hamilton III was the school's band leader.
