= Barnwell House =

Historic house in South Carolina, United States

- U.S. National Register of Historic Places
- Location within South Carolina Location within the United States
- Location: South of Charleston, Adams Run, South Carolina
- Coordinates: 32°41′54″N 80°24′22″W
- Area: 6.6 acres (2.7 ha)
- Built: 1878
- NRHP reference No.: 80003657
- Added to NRHP: November 25, 1980

Barnwell House, also known as Prospect Hill Plantation, is a historic home located at Adams Run, Charleston County, South Carolina. It consists of the front or main portion dating from 1878 and the rear section from early to mid-19th century. The main part is a 2 1/2-story building, with a stuccoed brick first story and weatherboarded upper story. The front façade features a one-story portico with a bell cast hip roof supported by two solid Doric order fluted columns. It was listed on the National Register of Historic Places in 1980.
