= Art Shell =

American football player and coach (born 1946)

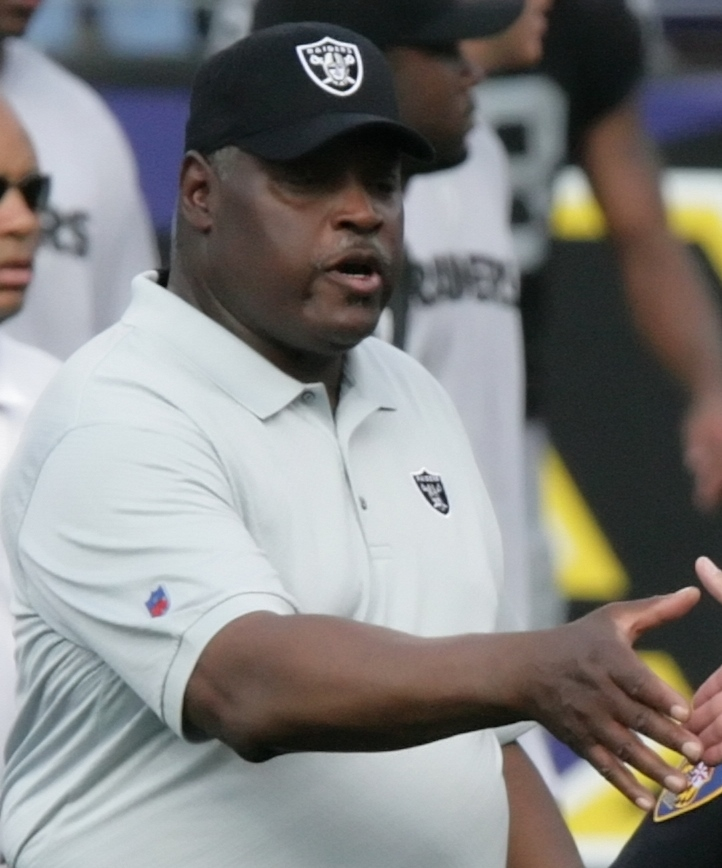
- Shell in 2006

No. 78
- Position: Offensive tackle

Personal information
- Born: November 26, 1946 (age 79); Charleston, South Carolina, U.S.
- Listed height: 6 ft 5 in (1.96 m)
- Listed weight: 265 lb (120 kg)

Career information
- High school: Bonds-Wilson (North Charleston, South Carolina)
- College: Maryland State (1964–1967)
- NFL draft: 1968: 3rd round, 80th overall pick

Career history

Playing
- Oakland / Los Angeles Raiders (1968–1982)

Coaching
- Los Angeles Raiders (1983–1989) Offensive line coach; Los Angeles Raiders (1989) Interim head coach; Los Angeles Raiders (1990–1994) Head coach; Kansas City Chiefs (1995–1996) Offensive line coach; Atlanta Falcons (1997–2000) Offensive line coach; Oakland Raiders (2006) Head coach

Awards and highlights
- As a player: 3× Super Bowl champion (XI, XV, XVIII); 2× First-team All-Pro (1974, 1977); 2× Second-team All-Pro (1975, 1978); 8× Pro Bowl (1972–1978, 1980); NFL 1970s All-Decade Team; NFL 100th Anniversary All-Time Team; Second-team Little All-American (1967); 3× First-team All-CIAA (1965–1967); South Carolina Sports Hall of Fame; As a coach: UPI NFL Coach of Year (1990); Pro Football Weekly NFL Coach of the Year (1990); Greasy Neale Award (1990)

Career AFL/NFL statistics
- Games played: 207
- Games started: 169
- Fumble recoveries: 8
- Stats at Pro Football Reference

Head coaching record
- Regular season: 56–52 (.519)
- Postseason: 2–3 (.400)
- Career: 58–55 (.513)
- Coaching profile at Pro Football Reference
- Pro Football Hall of Fame
- College Football Hall of Fame

Arthur Lee Shell Jr. (born November 26, 1946) is an American former professional football player and coach. He played as an offensive tackle in the American Football League (AFL) and later in the National Football League (NFL) for the Oakland / Los Angeles Raiders. He played college football at Maryland State College—now University of Maryland Eastern Shore—and was drafted by the Raiders in the third round (80th overall) of the 1968 NFL/AFL draft. He was later a twice head coach for the Raiders. He holds the distinction of becoming the second African American head coach in the history of professional football and the first in the sport's modern era. Shell was inducted into the College Football Hall of Fame in 2013 and into the Pro Football Hall of Fame in 1989.

== Early life ==
Shell was born on November 26, 1946, in Charleston or North Charleston, South Carolina. He was the oldest child of Arthur Lee Shell Sr., a machine set operator, and Gertrude Shell, who died when Shell was 15. After her death, Shell took on added responsibility caring for his siblings. Shell attended the segregated Bonds-Wilson High School, which no longer exists, graduating in 1964. He was coached by James Fields and Eugene Gray. He made all-state teams in both basketball and football.

In 2015, Shell was inducted into the South Carolina Football Hall of Fame.

== College ==
Shell went to college at Maryland State College, now the University of Maryland Eastern Shore (UMES), an historically black college in Princess Anne, Maryland. He was coached by Roosevelt "Sandy" Gilliam, and played offensive tackle and defensive tackle on the football team. He was named a Little All-America his senior year in 1967, All-Conference in three seasons, and was named All-America by the Pittsburgh Courier and Ebony magazine in 1967. Shell's teams were 20–8–1. Future College Football Hall of Fame and NFL running back Emerson Boozer was one of his teammates. He graduated in 1968 with a Bachelor of Science degree in industrial arts. Shell is a member of Alpha Phi Alpha fraternity.

== Playing career ==
Shell was drafted 80th overall in the third round by the American Football League's Oakland Raiders. Playing offensive tackle, Shell participated in 23 postseason playoff contests in the AFL and NFL, including eight AFC or AFL championship games, a loss in Super Bowl II, and victories in Super Bowls XI and XV. He was a four time All-Pro (two times first-team and two second-team), and was named to eight Pro Bowls.

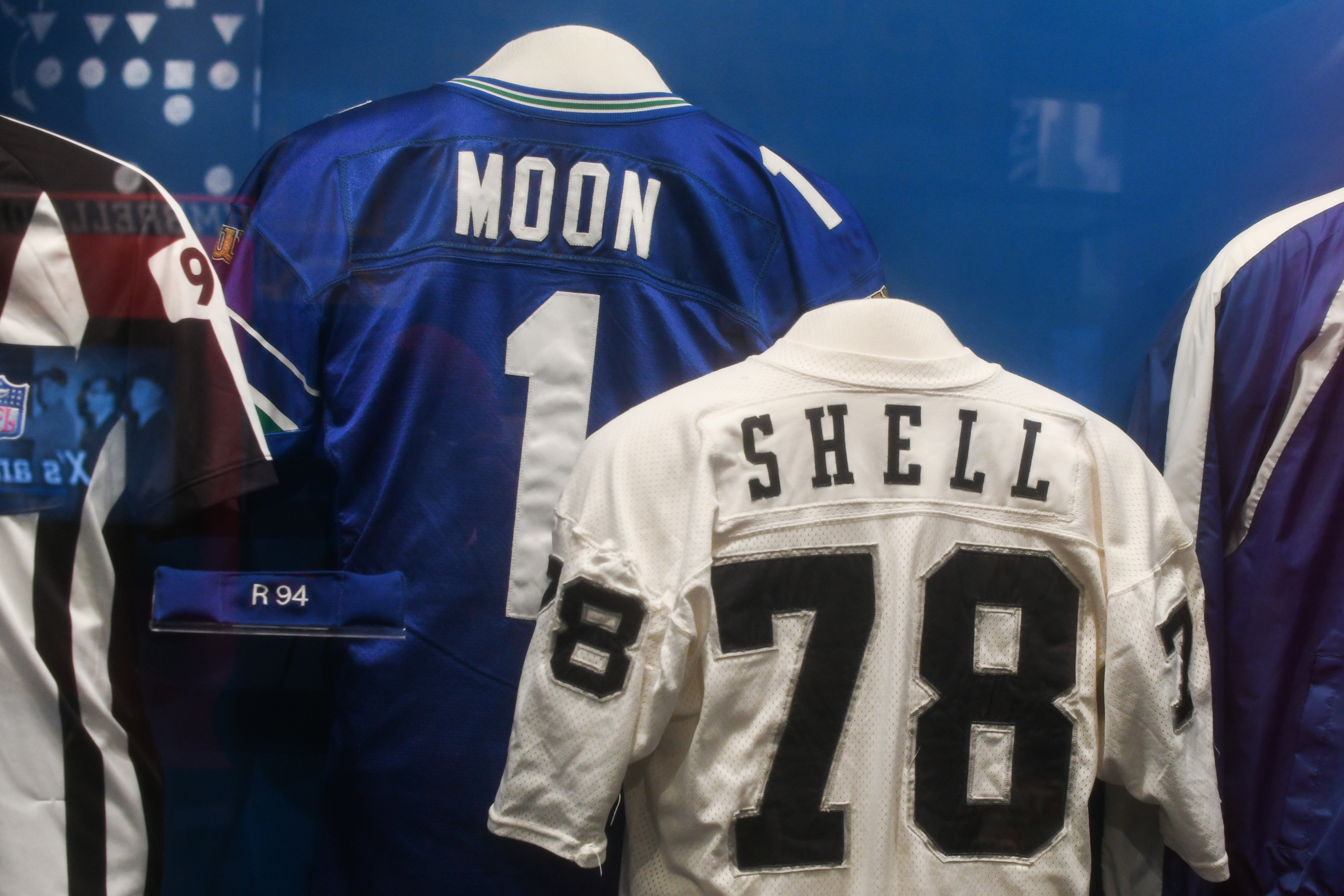
Art Shell's Raiders jersey is shown displayed in the Pro Football Hall of Fame.

He played 15 seasons for the Raiders. He was a top special teams player his first two years, and then moved to offensive line in his third year, becoming equally adept at pass and run blocking. Shell played 156 straight games for the Raiders until he suffered a preseason injury in 1979, and after he recovered, Shell played another 51 straight games until he was injured again in 1982, his final season. Shell played next to Hall of Fame and 100th Anniversary All-Time teammate guard Gene Upshaw in three different decades. He was also offensive linemates with Hall of Fame and 100th Anniversary All-Time teammate Jim Otto and Hall of Fame offensive tackle Bob Brown.

== Legacy and honors ==
Shell was elected to the Pro Football Hall of Fame in 1989. In 2019, he was named to the NFL 100th Anniversary All-Time Team. In 1999, he was ranked number 55 on The Sporting News' list of the 100 Greatest Football Players. In 2021, The Athletic listed Shell as the 76th greatest player ever. He was also a member of the 1970s All-Decade Team and the Super Bowl Silver Anniversary Team (1990).

He was inducted into the UMES Hall of Fame in 1984, Central Intercollegiate Athletic Association (CIAA) Hall of Fame in 2006, the Black College Hall of Fame in 2011, and the College Football Hall of Fame in 2013. Since 2000, Shell has held the UMES Celebrity Golf Classic, a celebrity golf tournament.

== Coaching career ==
Shell was an offensive line coach with the Raiders from 1983 to 1988. In 1989, the Raiders owner Al Davis hired Shell as his head coach to replace Mike Shanahan, becoming the first black head coach in modern NFL history, and the first since Fritz Pollard in 1925.

=== Los Angeles Raiders ===
Through Al Davis, Shell is a member of the Sid Gillman coaching tree. As coach of the Raiders from 1989 to 1994 (at the time located in Los Angeles), Shell coached 12 games in 1989, and 16 games/year from 1990 to 1994, compiling a record of 54 wins and 38 losses. Shell was named AFC Coach of the Year in 1990, when the Raiders won the AFC West division with a 12–4 record, and advanced to the AFC championship game in the playoffs, becoming the first African-American coach to lead the team to the Conference Championship game. Shell also received the Maxwell Club's coach of the year award (the Greasy Neale Award), and Pro Football Weekly's NFL Coach of the Year Award. Al Davis, owner of the Raiders, fired Shell after a 9–7 season in 1994, a move Davis later called "a mistake."

=== After the Raiders ===
After leaving the Raiders, Shell went on to coaching positions with the Kansas City Chiefs (offensive line coach 1995-1996) and Atlanta Falcons (offensive line coach for four years before resigning in early 2001), before serving as a senior vice president for the NFL, in charge of football operations. In 2004, Shell became the NFL's Senior Vice President over football operations, supervising all football operations and development.

=== 2006 return to Raiders ===
Shell was working for the NFL when he was officially re-hired by the-then Oakland Raiders as head coach on February 11, 2006. After leading the team to its worst record (2 wins, 14 losses) since 1962, despite having one of the best defenses, Shell was fired for the second time as head coach of the Raiders on January 4, 2007.

=== Head coaching record ===
Team	Year	Regular season					Postseason			
Team	Year	Won	Lost	Ties	Win %	Finish	Won	Lost	Win %	Result
RAI	1989	7	5	0	.583	3rd in AFC West	—	—	—	—
RAI	1990	12	4	0	.750	1st in AFC West	1	1	.500	Lost to Buffalo Bills in AFC Championship Game
RAI	1991	9	7	0	.563	3rd in AFC West	0	1	.000	Lost to Kansas City Chiefs in AFC wild card game
RAI	1992	7	9	0	.438	4th in AFC West	—	—	—	—
RAI	1993	10	6	0	.625	2nd in AFC West	1	1	.500	Lost to Buffalo Bills in AFC Divisional Game
RAI	1994	9	7	0	.563	3rd in AFC West	—	—	—	—
OAK	2006	2	14	0	.125	4th in AFC West	—	—	—	—
Total		56	52	0	.518		2	3	.400	

== Personal life ==
Shell is the father of Billie Dureyea Shell, the author of the Unfaithful book trilogy, and the great-uncle of Brandon Shell, an offensive lineman who was drafted in 2016 by the New York Jets.

== See also ==
- List of American Football League players
- Bay Area Sports Hall of Fame
