= Bobby Wood (disambiguation) =

Bobby Wood (born 1992) is an American soccer player.

Bobby Wood may also refer to:

- Bobby Wood (American football) (1916–1973), American football player
- Bobby Wood (footballer) (1892–1928), Scottish footballer
- Bobby Wood (American politician) (1935–2023), American politician
- Bobby Wood, American session pianist most famous for his work as a member of The Memphis Boys, including with Elvis Presley, and also for Garth Brooks
- Bobby Wayne Woods (1965-2009), American murderer, kidnapper, and rapist

== See also ==
- Bob Wood (disambiguation)
- Robert Wood (disambiguation)
