= South Carolina Football Hall of Fame =

Sports

The South Carolina Football Hall of Fame honors athletes, coaches, businesses, and media professionals connected to South Carolina who have made a significant and positive impact through American football. It is a "for impact" charitable organization.

The South Carolina Football Hall of Fame has been inducting members since 2013 and has inducted 40 members as of July 22, 2021. The South Carolina Football Hall of Fame is on a mission to bring South Carolina to the top 10 in college and career readiness by December 31, 2030. This mission was set after Usnews.com ranked South Carolina 43rd in college and career readiness. The program supporting this mission is called the Bridge Builder Excellence Program and each year it awards one high school football player who has been a leader on the field, in the classroom, and in the community with the Bridge Builder Excellence Award. The South Carolina Football Hall of Fame also gives out two other awards which are the Humanitarian of the Year and the Blanchard-Rogers trophy which is named after the only two players with South Carolina ties to win the Heisman trophy, Doc Blanchard and George Rogers. The Humanitarian of the Year is given to someone who has made an impact on football in South Carolina while also helping their communities. The Blanchard-Rogers Trophy is given to the top college football player either from South Carolina or with South Carolina ties.

== Inductees ==
The inductees of the South Carolina Football Hall of Fame's 2013 class include: Frank Howard, Sam Wyche, Donnie Shell, George Rogers, Willie Jeffries, Banks McFadden, Danny Ford, and Harry Carson.

The inductees of the South Carolina Football Hall of Fame's 2014 class include: Freddie Solomon, William Perry, Sterling Sharpe, and Deacon Jones.

The inductees of the South Carolina Football Hall of Fame's 2015 class include: Art Shell, Jerry Richardson, Dan Reeves, and Brian Dawkins.

The inductees of the South Carolina Football Hall of Fame's 2016 class include: Jeff Davis, Stanley Morgan, Michael Dean Perry, and Dal Shealy.

The inductees of the South Carolina Football Hall of Fame's 2017 class include: Dick Sheridan, Levon Kirkland, Fisher DeBerry, Charlie Brown, and Doc Blanchard.

The inductees of the South Carolina Football Hall of Fame's 2018 class include: John Abraham, Dwight Clark, Clay Matthews Sr., Paul Maguire, and Richard Seymour.

The inductees of the South Carolina Football Hall of Fame's 2019 class include: Dode Phillips, Steve Greer, Steve Fuller, Stephen Davis, and Bobby Bryant.

The inductees of the South Carolina Football Hall of Fame's 2020 class include: Steve Spurrier, Robert Porcher, Art Baker, Willie Scott, and Charlie Waters

The inductees of the South Carolina Football Hall of Fame's 2021 class include: Jeff Bostic, Peter Boulware, Dwayne Harper, Chester McGlockton, and Rick Sanford.

The 2022 inductees were Brad Edwards, Joe Bostic, John Gilliam, Mike Ayers, and Stanford Jennings.

Ben Coates, Harold Green, Jimmy Satterfield, Stump Mitchell and Terry Allen entered the hall of fame for 2023.

Troy Brown, Jim Carlen, Buddy Pough, Duce Staley and Jim Stuckey were chosen for 2024.

Jerry Butler, Dexter Coakley, Todd Ellis, A. J. Green and Bob Jeter joined for 2025.

== Awards ==
The South Carolina Football Hall of Fame has only awarded three individuals with the Bridge Builder Excellence Award. The first to receive the award was Javarius Youmans in 2020, the second being Nehemiah "Nemo" Squire in 2021, and the most recent being Davion Joyner.

The South Carolina Football Hall of Fame has given out the Humanitarian of the Year award a total of 7 times. The winners of the award are Paul Kennemore (2014), Dal Shealy (2015), Joe Moglia (2016), Mike Brown (2017), Ramon Robinson (2018), Harold White (2019), and Sam Wyche (2020).

The South Carolina Football Hall of Fame has given out the Blanchard-Rogers Trophy 10 times and has had 9 winners. The 7 winners are Tajh Boyd (2013), Vic Beasley (2014), Deshaun Watson (2015 & 2016), Mason Rudolph (2017), Travis Etienne (2018), Trevor Lawrence (2019), Kevin Harris (2020), Grayson McCall (2021), and Jalin Hyatt (2022).
