= Rantowles, Hollywood, South Carolina =

Settlement in South Carolina

Coordinates: 32°46′59″N 80°08′55″W

Rantowles, South Carolina is an unincorporated community in what is now Hollywood, and Ravenel, South Carolina, near the Stono River and Stono Swamp. Rantowles Creek runs through the area.

Google Maps places the community at the intersection of SC 162 and United States Route 17.

It is the near the Stono River Slave Rebellion Site, a U.S. National Historic Landmark and location of the start of the Stono Rebellion, the first large-scale slave revolt in the United States.

There was a Rantowles Depot. There is a Rantowles Bridge. Rantowles Creek feeds into the Stono River. Coburg Dairy was established in the area.

Benjamin Simmoms stated he lived at Rantowles on Russell Island (The Russell Creek Plantation is on Edisto Island).

Rescue Rantowles Creek is a film promoting conservation of the tidal estuary.
