= Stono Rebellion =

1739 slave revolt in the colony of South Carolina

- Part of the Slave Revolts in North America
- Date: September 9, 1739
- Location: South Carolina Lowcountry
- Goals: Escape to Spanish Florida
- Result: Suppression, execution of the rebels

Parties
Escaped slaves	South Carolina militia

Lead figures
Jemmy Cato (executed)	William Bull

Number
Around 80 at their height	Less than 100

Casualties and losses
35 to 50 killed in battle, more executed	Around 20 killed in battle, more than 20 executed by escaped slaves during the revolt

The Stono Rebellion (also known as Cato's Conspiracy or Cato's Rebellion) was a slave revolt that began on 9 September 1739, in the colony of South Carolina. It was the largest slave rebellion in the Southern Colonial era, with 25 colonists and 35 to 50 African slaves killed. The uprising's leaders were likely from the Central African Kingdom of Kongo, as they were Catholic and some spoke Portuguese.

The leader of the rebellion, Jemmy, was a literate enslaved man. In some reports, however, he is referred to as "Cato", and likely was held by the Cato (or Cater) family, who lived near the Ashley River and north of the Stono River. He led 20 other enslaved Kongolese, who may have been former soldiers, in an armed march south from the Stono River. They were bound for Spanish Florida, where successive proclamations had promised freedom for fugitive slaves from British North America.

Jemmy and his group recruited nearly 60 other slaves and killed more than 20 whites before being intercepted and defeated by the South Carolina militia near the Edisto River. Survivors traveled another 30 miles (50 km) before the militia finally defeated them a week later. Most of the captured slaves were executed; the surviving few were sold to markets in the West Indies. In response to the rebellion, the General Assembly passed the Negro Act of 1740, which restricted slaves' freedoms and placed a moratorium on importing new slaves.

== Causes ==
=== Local factors ===
Since 1708, the majority of the population of the South Carolina colony were enslaved Africans, as importation of slaves from Africa had increased in recent decades with labor demand for the expansion of cotton and rice cultivation as commodity export crops. Historian Ira Berlin has called this the Plantation Generation, noting that South Carolina had become a "slave society", as opposed to a "society with slaves", with slavery central to its economy. Planters bought slaves taken from Africa to satisfy the increased demand for labor. Most slaves were Black Africans. Many in South Carolina were from the Kingdom of Kongo, which had converted to Catholicism in the 15th century. Numerous slaves had first been sold into slavery in the West Indies (in particular, Barbados) before being sold to South Carolina.

With the increase in slaves, colonists tried to regulate their relations, but there was always negotiation in this process. Slaves resisted by running away or initiating work slowdowns and revolts. At the time, Georgia was still an all-white colony, without slavery. South Carolina worked with Georgia to strengthen patrols on land and in coastal areas to prevent fugitives from reaching Spanish Florida. In the Stono case, the slaves may have been inspired by several factors to mount their rebellion. Spanish Florida offered freedom to fugitive slaves from the Southern Colonies; successive governors in the colony had issued proclamations offering freedom for fugitive slaves in Florida in exchange for converting to Catholicism and serving for a period in the colonial militia. As a line of defense for Spanish Florida's largest settlement of St. Augustine, the settlement of Fort Mose was established by the colonial government to house fugitive slaves who had reached the colony. Stono was 150 miles (240 km) from the Florida line.

A malaria epidemic had recently killed many whites in Charleston, weakening the power of slaveholders. Lastly, historians have suggested the slaves organized their revolt to take place on Sunday, when planters would be occupied in church and might be unarmed. The Security Act of 1739 (which required all white males to carry arms even to church on Sundays) had been passed in August of that year in response to earlier runaways and minor rebellions, but it had not fully taken effect. Local officials were authorized to mount penalties against white men who did not carry arms after 29 September.

=== African background ===
Jemmy, the leader of the revolt, was a literate slave described in an eyewitness account as "Angolan". Historian John K. Thornton has noted that he was more likely from the Kingdom of Kongo, as were the cohort of 20 slaves that joined him. The slaves were Catholic and some spoke Portuguese, both of which point to Kongo. A lengthy trade relationship with the Portuguese had led to the adoption of Catholicism and learning of the Portuguese language in the kingdom. The leaders of the Kingdom of Kongo had voluntarily converted in 1491, followed by their people; by the 18th century, the religion was a fundamental part of its citizens' identity. The nation had independent relations with Rome. Slavery was present in the region and it was regulated by Kongo.

Portuguese was the language of trade as well as one of the languages of educated people in Kongo. The Portuguese-speaking slaves in South Carolina were more likely to have learned about offers of freedom by Spanish agents. They would also have been attracted to the Catholicism of Spanish Florida. In the early 18th century, Kongo had been undergoing civil wars, leading to more people being captured and sold into slavery, including trained soldiers. It is likely that Jemmy and his rebel cohort were such military men, as they fought hard against the militia when they were caught, and were able to kill 20 men.

== Events of the revolt ==
On Wednesday, 9 September 1739, Jemmy gathered "some Angola Negroes...to the number of Twenty" near the Stono River, 20 miles (30 km) southwest of Charleston. Mark M. Smith argues that taking action on the day after the Feast of the Nativity of Mary connected their Catholic past with present purpose, as did the religious symbols they used. The Africans marched down the roadway with a banner that read "Liberty!", and chanted the same word in unison. They attacked Hutchinson's store at the Stono River Bridge, killing two storekeepers and seizing weapons and ammunition.

Raising a flag, the slaves proceeded south toward Spanish Florida, a well-known refuge for escapees. On the way, they gathered more recruits, sometimes reluctant ones, for a total of 81. They burned six plantations and killed 23 to 28 whites along the way. While on horseback, South Carolina's Lieutenant Governor William Bull and five of his friends came across the group; they quickly went off to warn other slaveholders. Rallying a militia of planters and minor slaveholders, the colonists traveled to confront Jemmy and his followers.

The next day, the well-armed and mounted militia, numbering 19–99 men, caught up with the group of 76 slaves at the Edisto River. In the ensuing confrontation, 23 whites and 47 slaves were killed. While the slaves lost, they killed proportionately more whites than was the case in later rebellions. The colonists mounted the severed heads of the rebels on stakes along major roadways to serve as warning for other slaves who might consider revolt. The lieutenant governor hired Chickasaw and Catawba Indians and other slaves to track down and capture the Africans who had escaped from the battle. A group of the slaves who escaped fought a pitched battle with a militia a week later approximately 30 miles (50 km) from the site of the first conflict. The colonists executed most of the rebels; they sold others to the markets of the West Indies.

This excerpt is from George Cato who said this was passed down in his family:

"I reckon it was hot, 'cause in less than two days, 21 white men, women, and children, and 44 Negroes, was slain. My granddaddy say that in the woods and at Stono, where the war start, there was more than 100 Negroes in line. When the militia come in sight of them at Combahee swamp, the drinking, dancing Negroes scatter in the brush and only 44 stand their ground. Commander Cato speak for the crowd. He say: 'We don't like slavery. We start to join the Spanish in Florida. We surrender but we not whipped yet and we is not converted.' The other 43 say: 'Amen.' They was taken, unarmed, and hanged by the militia.

== Aftermath ==
Over the next two years, slave uprisings occurred independently in Georgia and South Carolina. Colonial officials believed these were inspired by the Stono Rebellion, but historians think the increasingly harsh conditions of slavery since the beginning of the 18th century under the rice and cotton cultures were sufficient cause.

Planters decided to develop a slave population who were native-born, believing the workers were more content if they grew up enslaved. Attributing the rebellion to the recently imported Africans, planters decided to cut off the supply. They enacted a 10-year moratorium on slave importation through Charleston. When, a decade later, they opened the port to the international slave trade again, planters imported slaves from areas other than the Congo-Angolan region.

In addition, the South Carolina legislature passed the Negro Act of 1740 to tighten controls: it required a ratio of one white to ten blacks on any plantation. It prohibited slaves from growing their own food, assembling in groups, earning money, or learning to read. In the uncertain world of the colony, several of the law's provisions were based on the assumption that whites could effectively judge black character; for instance, whites were empowered to examine blacks who were traveling outside a plantation without passes, and to take action.

The legislature also worked to improve conditions in slavery in order to avoid problems; it established penalties for masters who demanded excessive work or who brutally punished slaves. These provisions were difficult to enforce, as the law did not allow slave testimony against whites. They also started a school to teach slaves Christian doctrine. At the same time, the legislature tried to prevent slaves from being manumitted, as the representatives thought that the presence of free blacks in the colony made slaves restless. It required slaveholders to apply to the legislature for permission for each case of manumission; formerly, manumissions could be arranged privately. South Carolina kept these restrictions against manumission until slavery was abolished after the American Civil War.

== Legacy ==
- Stono River Slave Rebellion Site
- U.S. National Register of Historic Places
- U.S. National Historic Landmark
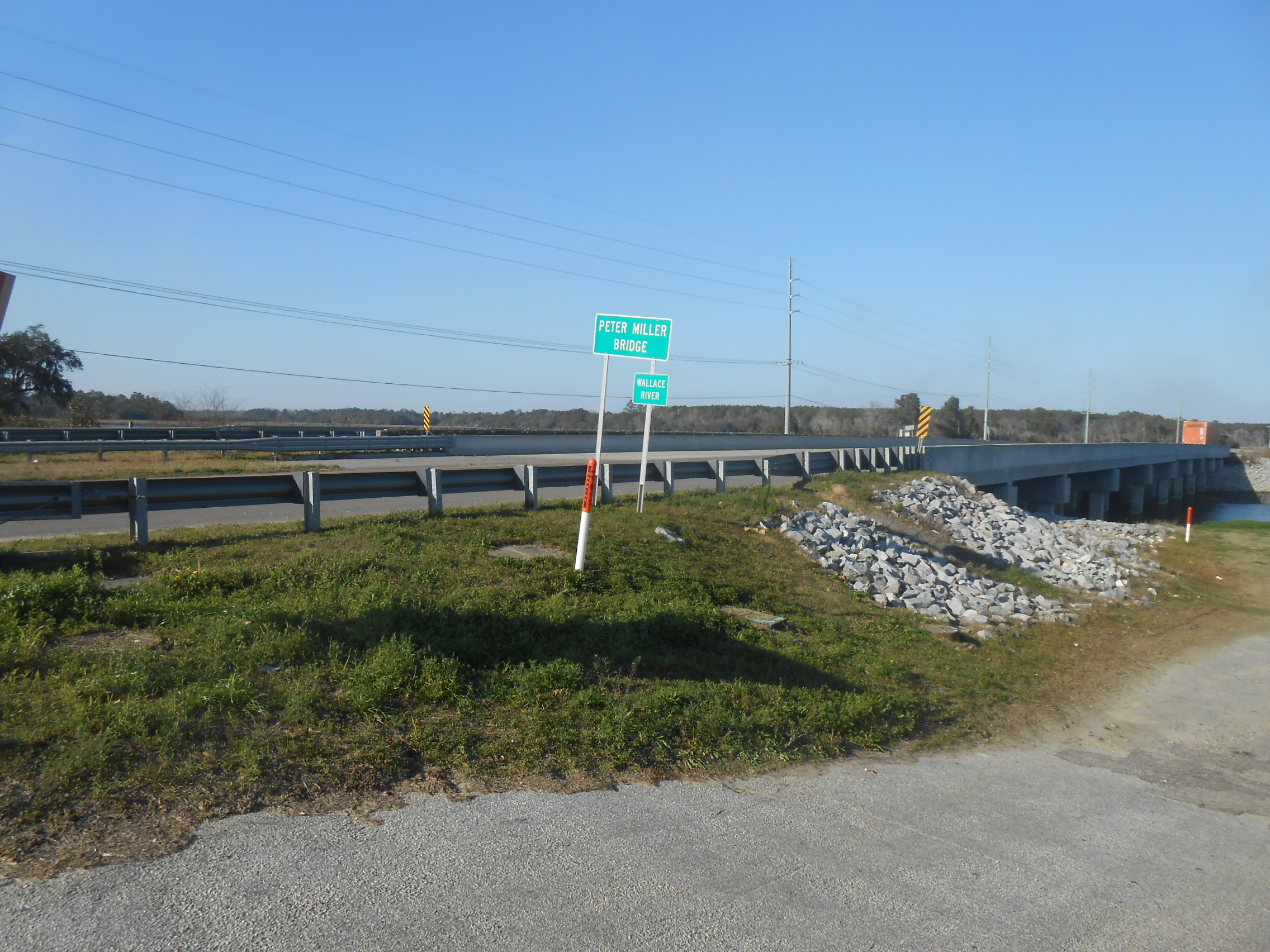
- Site where the rebellion began, photographed 2013.
- Nearest city: Rantowles, South Carolina
- Built: 1739
- NRHP reference No.: 74001840

Significant dates
- Added to NRHP: 30 May 1974
- Designated NHL: 30 May 1974

The Hutchinson's warehouse site, where the revolt began, was declared a National Historic Landmark in 1974. A South Carolina Historical Marker has also been erected at the site.

The text of the marker reads:

The Stono Rebellion (1739)

The Stono Rebellion, the largest slave insurrection in British North America, began nearby on September 9, 1739. About 20 Africans raided a store near Wallace Creek, a branch of the Stono River. Taking guns and other weapons, they killed two shopkeepers. The rebels marched south toward promised freedom in Spanish Florida, waving flags, beating drums, and shouting "Liberty!"

(on the reverse side)

The rebels were joined by 40 to 60 more during their 15-mile march. They killed at least 20 whites, but spared others. The rebellion ended late that afternoon when the militia caught the rebels, killing at least 54 of them. Most who escaped were captured and executed; any forced to join the rebels were released. The S.C. assembly [sic] soon enacted a harsh slave code, in force until 1865.

== See also ==
- List of National Historic Landmarks in South Carolina
- National Register of Historic Places listings in Charleston County, South Carolina

== References and further reading ==
Notes

Further reading

- Campbell, Ballard C. Campbell, ed. American Disasters: 201 Calamities That Shook the Nation (2008) pp. 22–23
- George Cato, interviewed by Stiles M. Scruggs, " 'As It Come Down to Me:' Black Memories of Stono in the 1930s", in Mark M. Smith, Stono: Documenting and Interpreting a Southern Slave Revolt, Columbia, SC: University of South Carolina Press, 2005. ISBN 1-57003-605-5, pp. 55-d
- Hoffer, Peter Charles: Cry Liberty. The Great Stono River Slave Rebellion of 1739. (Oxford University Press 2010). ISBN 978-0-19-538661-5.
- Rodriguez, Junius P., ed. Encyclopedia of Slave Resistance and Rebellion. Westport, CT: Greenwood, 2006. ISBN 0-313-33271-1.
- Shuler, Jack. Calling Out Liberty: The Stono Rebellion and the Universal Struggle for Human Rights. Jackson, MS: University Press of Mississippi, 2009. ISBN 978-1-60473-273-3
- Smith, Mark M., Stono: Documenting and Interpreting a Southern Slave Revolt, Columbia, SC: University of South Carolina Press, 2005. ISBN 1-57003-605-5, sourcebook.
- Thornton, John (October 1991). "African Dimensions of the Stono Rebellion". The American Historical Review. 4. 96 (4): 1101–1113. doi:10.2307/2164997. JSTOR 2164997.
- Wood, Peter. Black Majority: Negroes in Colonial South Carolina from 1670 through the Stono Rebellion, New York: Norton, 1975. ISBN 0-393-00777-4.
