= Robert Roosevelt Woods =

American politician (1953–2023)

Robert R. Woods

Member of the South Carolina House of Representatives from the 109th district
- In office 1973–1985
- Preceded by: James M. Condon
- Succeeded by: Lucille Whipper

Personal details
- Born: November 26, 1936 Winston-Salem, North Carolina, U.S.
- Died: August 25, 2002 (aged 65) Charleston, South Carolina
- Party: Democratic
- Spouse: Maxine Dunn
- Children: 6
- Profession: Pastor

Robert R. Woods (November 26, 1936 - August 25, 2002) was a former pastor and American politician of the Democratic Party.

== Profession ==
Woods was pastor of Wallingford Presbyterian Church in Charleston.

== Political career ==
Woods served as a member of the South Carolina House of Representatives representing District 109 from around 1975 to 1986. He served as Chairman of the House Invitations Committee and on the Medical, Military, Public and Municipal Affairs Committee.

He worked to protect the pay of military personnel on active duty leave and supported the efforts of community organizations like the Committee on Better Racial Assurance (COBRA), whose membership included Jim Clyburn.

In 1979, Woods, along with Representative McKinley Washington and others, filed a lawsuit to change the method of Charleston County Council elections. Plaintiffs in the case included Members of Charleston County Council, the Charleston County Election Commission, the Charleston County Democratic Party and Glenn McConnell in his role as Chair of the Charleston County Republican Party.

In 1986, Woods was convicted of mail fraud in connection with a United States Department of Agriculture sponsored child feeding program operated at the Wallingford United Presbyterian Church where he served as pastor. His seat in the South Carolina House of Representatives was vacated in the fall of 1986, and he was succeeded by Lucille Whipper, who won the general election. Woods appealed his conviction, but did not prevail.
