= Charleston County School District =

School district in South Carolina, United States

Address
- 75 Calhoun Street Charleston, Charleston County, South Carolina, 29401; United States

District information
- Grades: Pre-school – 12
- Superintendent: Anita W. Huggins (Acting)
- Accreditation: AdvancED

Students and staff
- Enrollment: 50,000 students
- Faculty: 6,500 employees district-wide

Other information
- Website: ccsdschools.com

Charleston County School District is a school district within Charleston County, South Carolina, United States. It educates roughly 50,000 kindergarten to 12th grade students in 80 schools.

== AdvancEd Accreditation ==
The Charleston County School District (CCSD) and all schools are accredited by Cognia.

== Superintendent ==
Current Superintendent Charleston County School District's (CCSD) Board of Trustees voted to name Anita Huggins, the Superintendent of Schools effective Jan. 22, 2024.

Previous Superintendents Charleston County School District's (CCSD) Board of Trustees voted to name Dr. Eric Gallien, the Superintendent of Schools effective July 1, 2023. Dr. Gallien is the highest paid CCSD employee in history with a contracted salary of $275,000 with a 2% increase every year. Dr. Gallien is making $28,405 more than former superintendent Kennedy.

On September 25, 2023 the board of education placed Dr. Gallien on paid administrative leave pending investigation and put Mrs. Huggins in the position pending investigation.

On October 27, 2023 the board and Dr. Gallien entered an agreement to release the contract between Dr. Gallien and the school district. Deputy superintendent Huggins, who was serving as superintendent, was named Acting Superintendent until a superintendent search is conducted some time in 2024.

== Board of trustees ==
The Charleston County School Board is composed of nine local members, each elected for a four-year term. Elections are held in November of even-numbered years. Charleston County School District's Superintendent, Donald R. Kennedy, Sr., serves as the executive secretary for the board of trustees.

Board of trustees members are elected countywide in non-partisan elections representing constituent districts as follows: two members from Districts 1 and 2, three members from Districts 3, 9, 10 and 23; and one member from District 20. In November 2020, five seats were filled for two-year terms to join the remaining four seats.

The board transited term to single-member districts in November 2022. Beginning in November 2022, all nine seats will be elected from non-partisan single-member districts with a combination of four-year and two-year terms. By November 2024, all seats will serve four-year terms.

The board meetings are held at 75 Calhoun Street in Charleston.

== Human resources ==
CCSD's goal is to provide prospective applicants with a wide variety of recruitment-related resources to assist them in their search for employment.

== Constituent districts ==
Charleston County School district was created by South Carolina Act 340 of the South Carolina General Assembly in 1967. The "Act of Consolidation" took the eight separate school districts and put them under a county-wide district to equally fund education in all areas of the county. The former independent school districts remain as constituent school districts within the structure of the Charleston County School district, with their own school boards and duties.

- St. James-Santee School District No. 1
- Moultrie School District No. 2
- James Island School District No. 3
- Cooper River School District No. 4
- St. John's School District No. 9
- St. Andrew's School District No. 10
- City of Charleston School District No. 20
- St. Paul's School District No. 23

== Schools ==
=== High schools ===
- Academic Magnet High: county-wide magnet
- Baptist Hill: neighborhood (District 23)
- Burke: neighborhood (District 20)
- Charleston Charter School for Math and Science: charter
- Clark Academy: county-wide program
- Greg Mathis Charter School: charter
- James Island Charter School: charter (District 3)
- Liberty Hill Academy: county-wide program
- Lucy Beckham High School: neighborhood (District 2)
- Military Magnet Academy: county-wide magnet
- North Charleston: neighborhood (District 4)
- R.B. Stall: neighborhood (District 4)
- St. John's: neighborhood (District 9)
- School of the Arts: county-wide magnet
- Wando: neighborhood (District 2, also serves District 1)
- West Ashley: neighborhood (District 10)

=== Middle schools ===
- Baptist Hill: neighborhood (District 23)
- Buist Academy: county-wide magnet
- C.E. Williams: partial magnet (District 10)
- Camp Road Middle School: neighborhood (District 3)
- Cario: neighborhood (District 2 also serves District 1)
- Charleston Charter School for Math and Science: charter
- Charleston Development Academy: charter
- Daniel Jenkins Creative Learning Center: county-wide program
- Deer Park Middle School: neighborhood (District 4)
- East Cooper Montessori Charter School: charter
- Haut Gap: partial magnet (District 9)
- Laing: partial magnet (District 2)
- Liberty Hill Academy: county-wide program
- Military Magnet Academy: county-wide magnet
- Montessori Community School Program: county-wide magnet program
- Morningside Middle School: neighborhood (District 4)
- Moultrie: neighborhood (District 2)
- Northwoods: neighborhood (District 4)
- Pattison's Academy for Comprehensive Education: charter
- St. Andrew's: partial magnet (District 10)
- St. James-Santee: neighborhood (District 1)
- Sanders-Clyde: neighborhood (District 20)
- School of the Arts: county-wide magnet
- West Ashley: partial magnet (District 10)
- Zucker: partial magnet (District 4)

=== Elementary and primary schools and programs ===
- Angel Oak Elementary: neighborhood (District 9)
- Ashley River Creative Arts Elementary: constituent district magnet (District 10)
- Belle Hall Elementary: neighborhood (District 2)
- Buist Academy: county-wide magnet
- Carolina Park Elementary: neighborhood (District 2)
- Carolina Voyager Charter: charter
- Charles Pinckney Elementary: neighborhood (District 2)
- Charleston Development Academy Public Charter: charter
- Charleston Progressive Academy: county-wide magnet
- Chicora School of Communications: neighborhood (District 4)
- Corcoran Elementary: neighborhood (District 4)
- Drayton Hall Elementary: neighborhood (District 20)
- Dunston Elementary: neighborhood (District 4)
- East Cooper Montessori Charter School: charter
- Ellington Elementary: neighborhood (District 23)
- Frierson Elementary: neighborhood (District 9)
- Goodwin Elementary: neighborhood (District 4)
- Harbor View Elementary: neighborhood (District 3)
- Hunley Park Elementary: neighborhood (District 4)
- Hursey Elementary: partial magnet (District 4)
- James B. Edwards Elementary: neighborhood (District 2)
- James Island Elementary: neighborhood (District 3)
- James Simmons Elementary: neighborhood (District 23)
- Jane Edwards Elementary: neighborhood (District 23)
- Jennie Moore Elementary: partial magnet (District 2)
- Ladson Elementary: neighborhood (District 4)
- Lambs Elementary: neighborhood (District 4)
- Laurel Hill Primary: neighborhood (District 2)
- Mary Ford Early Learning and Family Development Center: neighborhood (District 4)
- Meeting Street Elementary at Brentwood: neighborhood (District 4)
- Memminger School of Global Studies: partial magnet (District 20)
- Midland Park Primary: neighborhood (District 4)
- Minnie Hughes: neighborhood (District 23)
- Mitchell Math and Science: partial magnet (District 20)
- Montessori Community School Program: county-wide magnet program
- Mt. Pleasant Academy: neighborhood (District 2)
- Mt. Zion: neighborhood (District 2)
- Murray-LaSaine Elementary: neighborhood (District 3)
- North Charleston Creative Arts Elementary: partial magnet (District 4)
- North Charleston Elementary: neighborhood (District 4)
- Oakland Elementary: neighborhood (District 10)
- Pattison's Academy for Comprehensive Education: charter
- Pepperhill Elementary: neighborhood (District 4)
- Pinehurst Elementary: neighborhood (District 4)
- Sanders-Clyde Elementary: neighborhood (District 20)
- St. Andrews School of Math and Science: partial magnet (District 10)
- St. James-Santee Elementary: neighborhood (District 1)
- Springfield Elementary: neighborhood (District 10)
- Stiles Point Elementary: neighborhood (District 3)
- Stono Park Elementary: neighborhood (District 10)
- Sullivans Island Elementary: neighborhood (District 2)
- Whitesides Elementary: neighborhood (District 2)

=== Early Childhood Education ===
- Mary Ford Early Learning & Family Center (District 1)

== See also ==
- List of schools in Charleston, South Carolina
- Septima Poinsette Clark
