= Bob Wood (author) =

American author

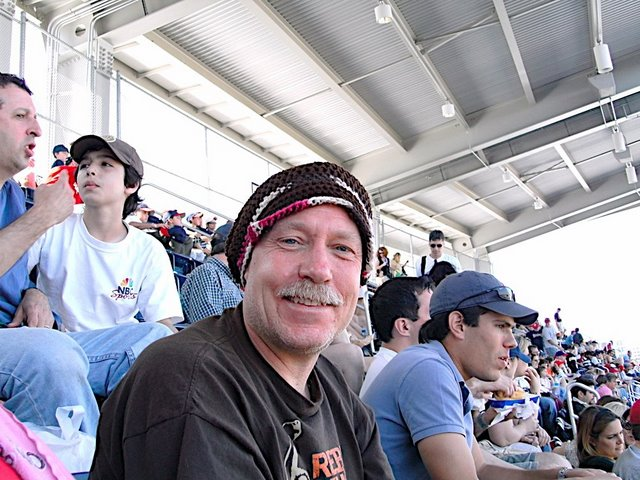
- Bob Wood attends a game between the Pittsburgh Pirates and Washington Nationals at Nationals Park on Sunday, May 4, 2008. This stadium was not a part of his original 1985 tour.
- Born: Robert Edward Wood; February 20, 1959 (age 67)
- Education: Michigan State University

Robert Edward "Bob" Wood (born February 20, 1959) is an American author, teacher and activist. As a 26-year-old high school history teacher from Kalamazoo, Michigan, (though teaching in Seattle, Washington at the time), he wrote the 1988 best selling book Dodger Dogs to Fenway Franks. In June 2008, the sports blog, Baseball Musings, wrote a story commemorating the 20th anniversary of Dodger Dogs to Fenway Franks.

Wood resides in Grand Haven, Michigan.

== First book ==
During the summer of 1985, Wood visited each of the 26 Major League Baseball stadiums. He graded the sites on eight criteria: layout and upkeep, the ball field, seating, the scoreboard, food, courtesy of employees, facilities and atmosphere. Giving grades from A+ to D, Wood concluded that the two best ball parks in the majors were Dodger Stadium in Los Angeles and Royals Stadium in Kansas City. The worst, he decided, were Houston's Astrodome and Toronto's Exhibition Stadium. The book was well known for its humor and Wood's tales from the road. Living on a teacher's salary, Wood sold his old Ford Pinto and bought a 1985 Toyota Tercel for the trip. In order to save money, he would often use Kampgrounds of America during the journey and wrote to every Major League team to ask for free tickets. Wood appeared on Late Night with David Letterman in promotion of the book on September 7, 1988.

== Second book ==
His follow-up book in 1989 was Big Ten Country: A Journey Through One Football Season. It focused on the college football stadiums and towns in the Big Ten Conference, but did not reach the critical nor commercial success of Dodger Dogs to Fenway Franks.

== Career and activism ==
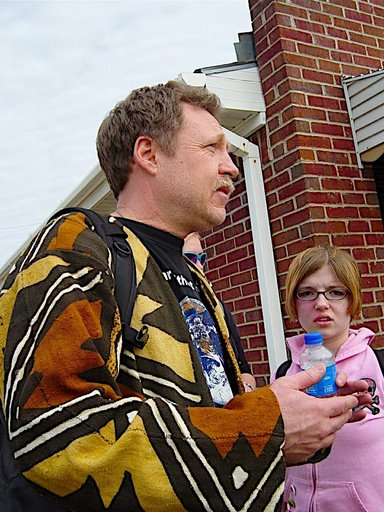
Wood taking part in an Alabama "Peace Walk" in 2007.

Wood, a 1980 graduate of Michigan State University, now teaches government, economics, and a course on Africa at Oakridge High School in Muskegon, Michigan. He also podcasts and maintains a blog "The Buddha Said I am Awake", known as "The Buddha Blog", on the school's public website.

Wood is highly involved with leftist political activism and led a group of students, the "Super Dupers", in protesting the Democratic Party's use of superdelegates during the 2008 presidential election. A staunch proponent of aiding Third World citizens with microfinancing via Kiva Loans, Wood often states "Action Counts Today!"

== Bibliography ==
- Wood, Bob (1988), Dodger Dogs to Fenway Franks, McGraw-Hill. ISBN 0-07-071696-X
- Wood, Bob (1989), Big Ten Country: A Journey Through One Football Season, HarperCollins. ISBN 0-688-08922-4
