= Willtown =

Archaeological site in South Carolina, United States

- Willtown Bluff
- U.S. National Register of Historic Places
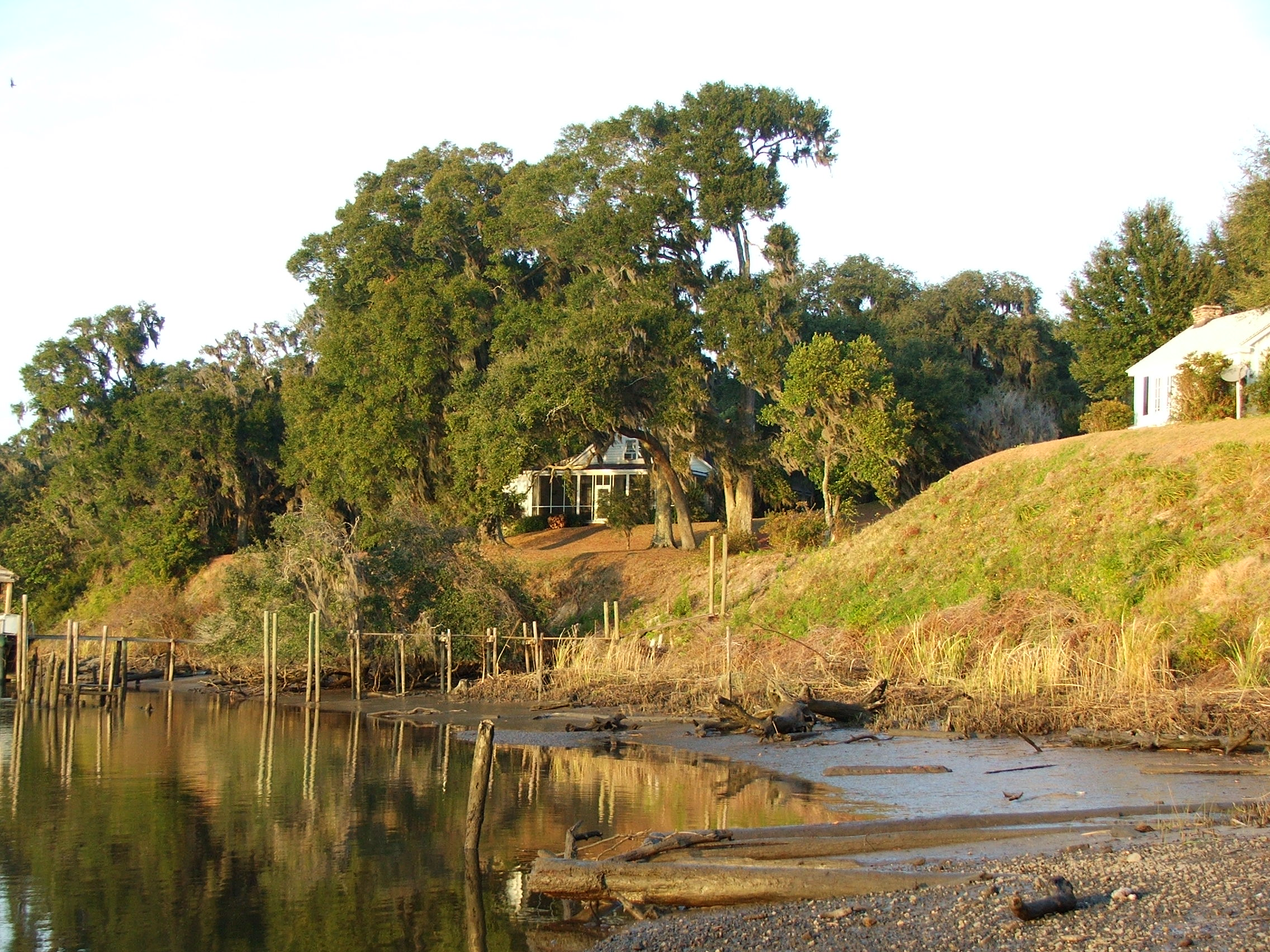

- Location within South Carolina Location within the United States
- Location: Southwest of Adams Run at the end of County Road 55 on the banks of the S. Edisto River, near Adams Run, South Carolina
- Coordinates: 32°40′54″N 80°24′54″W
- Area: 127.3 acres (51.5 ha)
- Built: c. 1704
- NRHP reference No.: 74001830
- Added to NRHP: January 8, 1974

Willtown Bluff, also known as Wilton and New London, is a historic settlement site located on the S. Edisto River near Adams Run, Charleston County, South Carolina. Founded about 1704, it was the second planned town to be established after the relocation of Charleston in 1682. Willtown served as a local governmental center (polling place, court of pleas, magistrate court) and regional commercial center. The property includes three early-19th-century buildings: the Parsonage (c. 1836), the Willtown Plantation House (c. 1820), and the remains of a single column of the Episcopal Church (c. 1836). Unexposed remains are of a colonial village thought to have had 80 houses.

It was listed on the National Register of Historic Places in 1974.
