= Charleston County School of the Arts =

Location
- Charleston, South Carolina; United States; 32.884597°N 80.00092°W

Information
- Motto: "Where talent and vision create the future."
- Established: 1995
- Founder: Rose Maree Myers
- School district: Charleston County School district
- Oversight: Charleston County School District
- Administrator: Shannon Cook
- Teaching staff: 68.50 (FTE)
- Grades: 6–12
- Enrollment: 1,069 (2023-2024)
- Campus: Suburban
- Mascot: Pegasus
- Newspaper: Applause
- Website: soa.ccsdschools.com

Charleston County School of the Arts (SOA) is a public magnet school located in North Charleston, South Carolina and is considered part of the Charleston County School District. It was founded in 1995 by Rose Maree Jordan Myers, who served as principal until 2007.

== Admissions ==
SOA serves more than 1,100 students in grades 6 through 12. Admission to SOA is based upon a competitive audition in one of nine majors: creative writing, dance, instrumental band, piano, string orchestra, theater arts, visual arts, vocal music, and fashion and costume design. In January 2010, SOA moved from its original campus to its new facility, which features one of the finest theaters in the state, The Rose Maree Myers Theater for the Performing Arts.

== Academics ==
SOA offers several AP level classes, with 76% of its graduates taking at least one AP exam. It has a graduation rate of 98%.

== Ratings ==
In August 2010, SOA was joined on its new Bonds-Wilson Campus by Academic Magnet High School. Both schools were named Gold Medal schools by U.S. News & World Report in its 2012 rankings. In 2022 SOA was ranked second among South Carolina High Schools, 47 among national Magnet High Schools, and 212 among national high schools.

== Notable alumni ==
- Hunter Parrish – Actor and singer, known for his role in the television series Weeds.
- Matt Watson – Comedian, musician, and co-founder of the YouTube channel SuperMega.
- Wyatt Hall – Award-winning contemporary visual artist.
