= Edisto Beach, South Carolina =

- Town
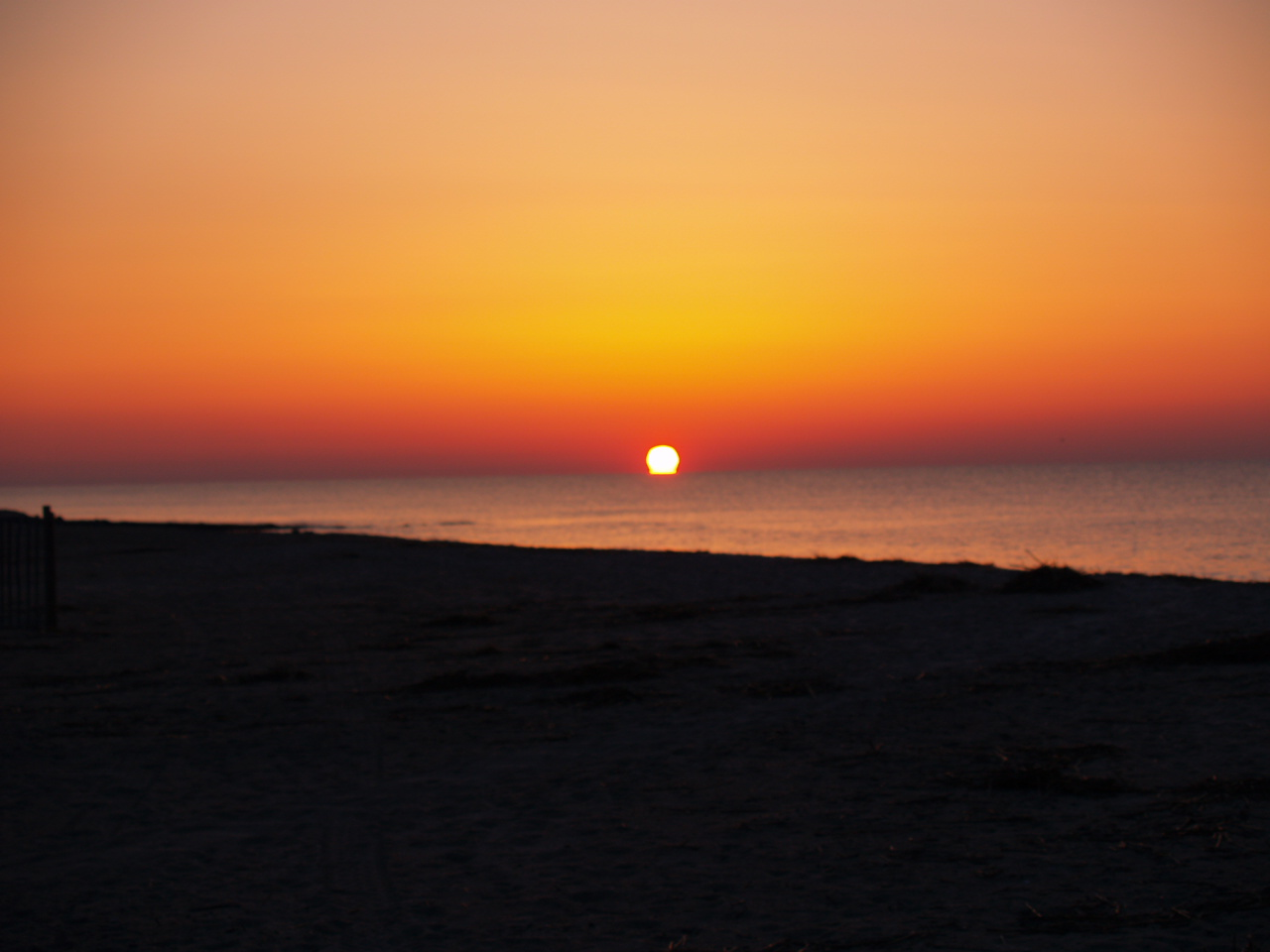
- Edisto sunrise

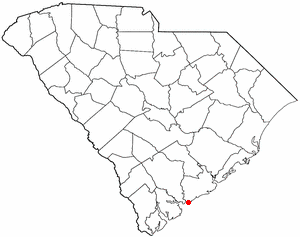
- Location of Edisto Beach, South Carolina
- Coordinates: 32°29′45″N 80°18′52″W
- Country: United States
- State: South Carolina
- County: Colleton
- Named after: Edisto people

Government
  - Type: Council–manager government
  - Mayor: Crawford Moore
  - Legislature: Edisto Beach Town Council

Area
  - Total: 2.35 sq mi (6.09 km^{2})
  - Land: 2.14 sq mi (5.53 km^{2})
  - Water: 0.21 sq mi (0.55 km^{2})
- Elevation: 3 ft (0.91 m)

Population (2020)
  - Total: 1,033
  - Density: 483.4/sq mi (186.65/km^{2})
- Time zone: UTC-5 (Eastern (EST))
  - Summer (DST): UTC-4 (EDT)
- ZIP code: 29438
- Area codes: 843, 854
- FIPS code: 45-23020
- GNIS feature ID: 2406424
- Website: www.townofedistobeach.com

Edisto Beach is a town in Colleton County, South Carolina, United States. Edisto Beach's population was 1,033 as of the 2020 census, up from 414 in 2010. The town limits include only the developed coastal area of Edisto Island within Colleton County, while the majority of the island consists of unincorporated land in Charleston County. Due to its status as a bedroom community, Edisto Beach is among the most affluent communities in the state.

== History ==
Edisto Beach was originally settled by the Edistow Indians, but was rediscovered by the Spanish in the late 16th century. Thereafter, commerce on the island began to develop. Rice and indigo were the most common crops during the early settlement years. Later, significant cotton plantations were built and flourished. This industry, fueled by rich land owners and the people they enslaved, prospered until the Civil War.

Although Union soldiers invaded Edisto and Johns Island, Confederate forces were able to retain control of Charleston until 1865, very late in the war.

Initial development was begun in the early 20th century and planned by the island's owner, John McConkey. However, development stalled when he was murdered. By the 1920s, South Carolina residents began arriving on Edisto Island and Edisto Beach to build crude retreats. In those days, access to the island could be gained only at low tide by driving or riding across the marsh on beds of oyster shells.

Although most homes on the island were destroyed in the 1940s, Hurricane Hugo spared the island in 1989. It has since become a vacation destination, with a section of the island purchased by Wyndham Resorts in 2006 from Fairfield that included a restaurant and golf course. In 2012, Edisto held its first ever road race, attracting close to 200 runners, including the mayor.

Edisto is known for its low tourism and its industrial scarcity.

== Politics and government ==
Edisto Beach is governed by a council–manager government. Under this style, the mayor and the mayor pro tem are elected from members of the town council. (Note: The town council is composed of five members.) City elections are non-partisan, however, during state and federal elections, Edisto trends toward conservatives. For instance, during the 2013 federal congressional special election, Edisto voted for Republican Mark Sanford by a forty-point margin (69%-29%) over challenging Democrat Elizabeth Colbert Busch. At the state level, Edisto is represented by Republican George E. "Chip" Campsen III in the Senate and Democrat Michael F. Rivers Sr. in the House of Representatives.

== Geography ==
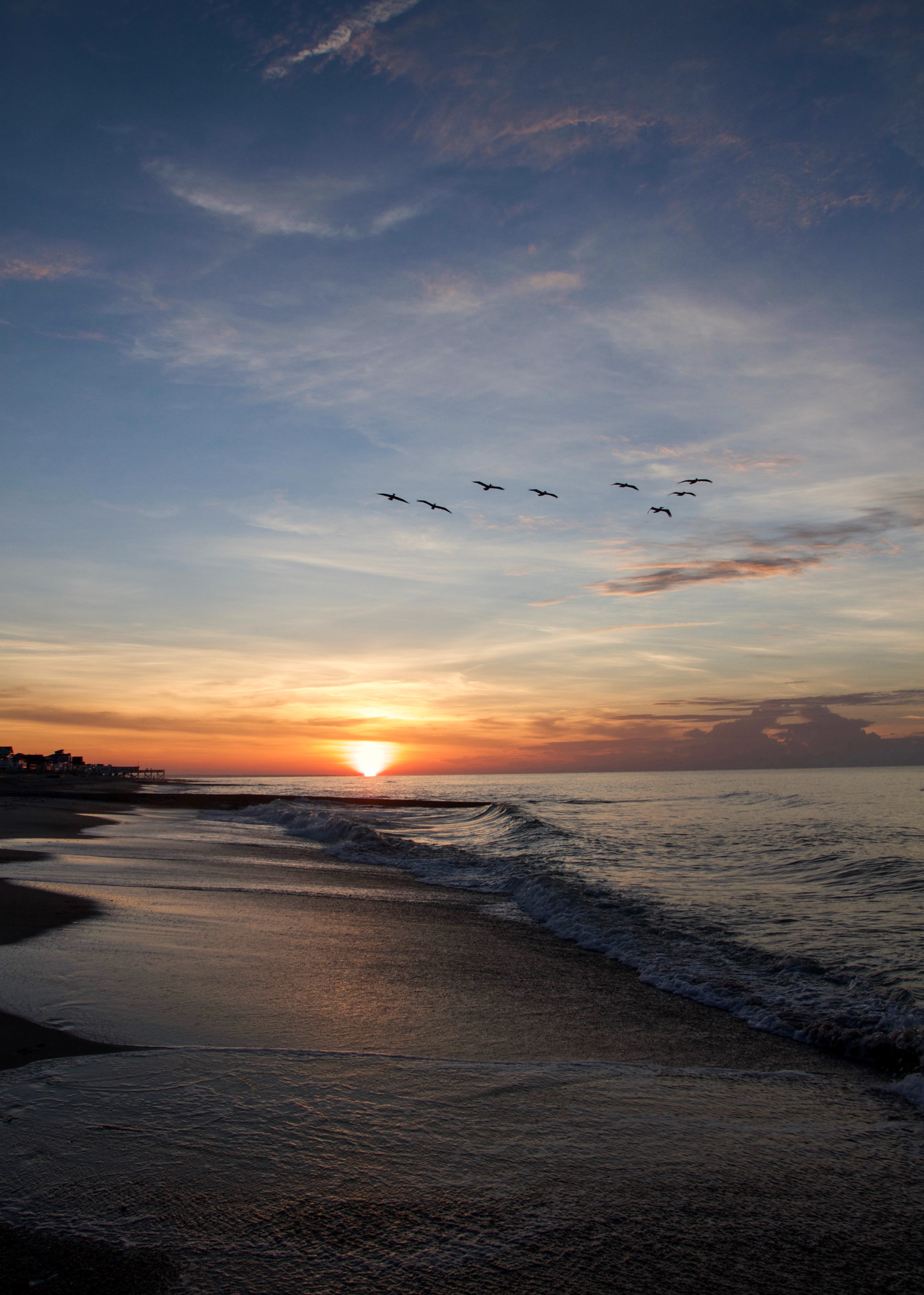
View of the shore at sunrise

Edisto Beach is located at the southeastern tip of Colleton County. It is separated from the rest of the county by the South Edisto River, the tidal portion of the Edisto River, so that the only road access is via South Carolina Highway 174 through Charleston County. SC 174 leads north across the rest of Edisto Island 24 miles (39 km) to U.S. Route 17 at Osborn. Charleston is 48 miles (77 km) by road northeast of Edisto Beach.

According to the United States Census Bureau, the town has a total area of 2.4 square miles (6.1 km^{2}), of which 2.1 square miles (5.5 km^{2}) is land and 0.2 square miles (0.6 km^{2}), or 9.48%, is water. Edisto Beach State Park borders the town to the north and east.

== Demographics ==
Historical population
Census	Pop.	Note	%±
1980	193		—
1990	340		76.2%
2000	641		88.5%
2010	414		−35.4%
2020	1,033		149.5%
U.S. Decennial Census

As of the 2010 census there were 414 people living year-round in the town. 203 or 49.0% were male, and 211 or 51.0% were female. Among the permanent population, the median age was 63.3 years, the population under 5 years was 4 or 1.0%, 17 and under was 14 or 3.4%, 18 and over was 400 or 96.6%, and 65 and over was 188 or 45.4% of the population. There were 8 families with children (3.4% of total households) residing in the town.

The population density in 2010 was 195 people per square mile (75.2/km^{2}). There were 2,181 housing units, with 232 or 10.6% owner-occupied and 1,903 or 87.2% rental or vacation units. The racial demographic was 409 or 98.8% white, 4 or 1.0% African American, 0 Native American or Alaska Native, 0 Asian, 1 or 0.2% some other race, and 0 from two or more races. Hispanic or Latino of any race were 2 or 0.5% of the population.

There were 232 households in 2010, out of which about 3.4% had children under the age of 18 living with them, 62.9% were married couples living together, 1.7% had a female householder with no husband present, and 35.3% were non-families. 31.0% of all households were made up of individuals, and 15.9% were someone living alone who was 65 years of age or older. The average household size was 1.78 and the average family size was 2.13.

For the period 2009–13, the estimated median income for a household in the town was $67,875, and the median income for a family was $100,500. Male full-time workers had a median income of $39,583 versus $48,125 for females. The per capita income for the town was $56,597. The estimated number of residents in the labor force was 286 or 49.1% (16 and older), and the mean travel time to work was 29.7 minutes. The unemployed rate was 14 or 2.4% of the work force. Two hundred ninety-six residents or 50.9% were not in the labor force.

== Education ==
Edisto Beach has a public library, a branch of the Colleton County Library System.

== Notable people ==
- James Jamerson, musician
- Patti LuPone, actress and singer
