= Adams Run, South Carolina =

Census-designated place in Charleston County, South Carolina

- Census-designated place
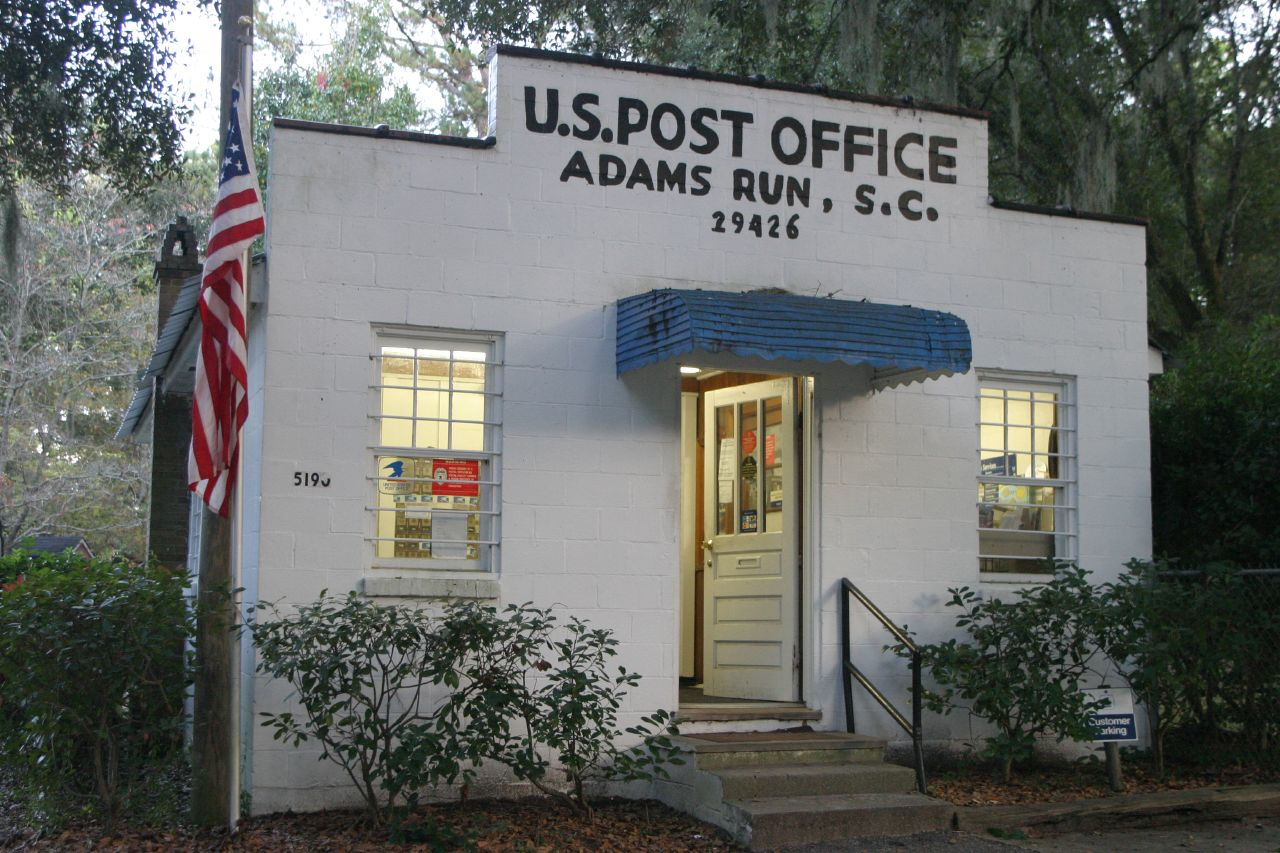
- Post office in Adams Run, November 2006

- Location within South Carolina Location within the United States
- Coordinates: 32°43′19″N 80°20′47″W
- Country: United States
- State: South Carolina
- County: Charleston

Area
  - Total: 1.42 sq mi (3.67 km^{2})
  - Land: 1.42 sq mi (3.67 km^{2})
  - Water: 0 sq mi (0.00 km^{2})
- Elevation: 33 ft (10 m)

Population (2020)
  - Total: 421
  - Density: 297.0/sq mi (114.69/km^{2})
- Time zone: UTC-5 (Eastern (EST))
  - Summer (DST): UTC-4 (EDT)
- ZIP code: 29426
- Area codes: 843, 854
- GNIS feature ID: 2812939

Adams Run is a census-designated place (CDP) in Charleston County, South Carolina, United States. It was first listed as a CDP in the 2020 census with a population of 421.

== Description ==
Adams Run has a post office with ZIP code 29426, which opened on August 15, 1843.

== Christ Church ==
Christ Church is one of the oldest churches in Adams Run. It is located just a few hundred yards away from the post office. While the congregation was organized around 1835, this church was not constructed until after the Civil War. Completed in 1887, it was built using materials from the first church, which was located at nearby Willtown Bluff, an historic settlement.

In 1962 Christ Church merged with another church, St. Paul’s in Meggett. The consolidated church was called ChristSt. Paul's Episcopal Church. The congregation is now an Anglican parish and worships in a new sanctuary across from the historic St. Paul's; the new sanctuary was completed in 2008.

Although regular Sunday services are no longer held in the Adams Run church, ChristSt. Paul's Church often opens the historic sanctuary for special occasions. Christ Church at Adams Run, as well as its grounds and graveyard, are maintained by Christ St.Paul's.

== Notable Places ==
The Barnwell House, Grove Plantation, King Cemetery, Summit Plantation House, Wilkinson-Boineau House, and Willtown Bluff are listed on the National Register of Historic Places.

== Demographics ==
Historical population
Census	Pop.	Note	%±
2020	421		—
U.S. Decennial Census; 2020

Adams Run first appeared as a census designated place in the 2020 U.S. census.

=== Racial and ethnic composition ===
Adams Run CDP, South Carolina – Racial and ethnic composition Note: the US Census treats Hispanic/Latino as an ethnic category. This table excludes Latinos from the racial categories and assigns them to a separate category. Hispanics/Latinos may be of any race.
Race / Ethnicity (NH = Non-Hispanic)	Pop 2020	% 2020
White alone (NH)	125	29.69%
Black or African American alone (NH)	261	62.00%
Native American or Alaska Native alone (NH)	0	0.00%
Asian alone (NH)	0	0.00%
Native Hawaiian or Pacific Islander alone (NH)	0	0.00%
Other race alone (NH)	1	0.24%
Mixed race or Multiracial (NH)	13	3.09%
Hispanic or Latino (any race)	21	4.99%
Total	421	100.00%

== See also ==
- List of census-designated places in South Carolina
