= Hollywood, South Carolina =

- Town
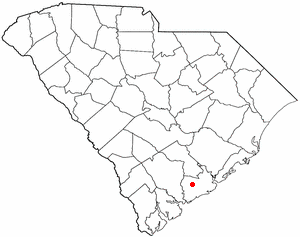
- Location of Hollywood in South Carolina
- Coordinates: 32°44′3″N 80°14′30″W
- Country: United States
- State: South Carolina
- County: Charleston

Government
  - Mayor: Chardale Murray

Area
  - Total: 24.92 sq mi (64.54 km^{2})
  - Land: 23.57 sq mi (61.04 km^{2})
  - Water: 1.35 sq mi (3.49 km^{2})
- Elevation: 30 ft (9.1 m)

Population (2020)
  - Total: 5,339
  - Density: 226.5/sq mi (87.46/km^{2})
- Time zone: UTC-5 (EST)
  - Summer (DST): UTC-4 (EDT)
- ZIP code: 29449
- Area codes: 843, 854
- FIPS code: 45-34495
- GNIS feature ID: 2405856
- Website: www.townofhollywood.org

Hollywood is a town in Charleston County, South Carolina, United States. As of the 2020 census, Hollywood had a population of 5,339. Hollywood is part of the Charleston, South Carolina metropolitan area and the Charleston-North Charleston Urbanized Area.

== Geography ==
Hollywood is located in western Charleston County. It is bordered by Ravenel to the north and Meggett to the south. Charleston is 21 miles (34 km) to the east.

According to the United States Census Bureau, Hollywood has a total area of 24.5 square miles (63.5 km^{2}), of which 23.1 square miles (59.9 km^{2}) is land and 1.4 square miles (3.6 km^{2}), or 5.64%, is water.

== Demographics ==
Historical population
Census	Pop.	Note	%±
1950	246		—
1960	334		35.8%
1970	339		1.5%
1980	729		115.0%
1990	2,094		187.2%
2000	3,946		88.4%
2010	4,714		19.5%
2020	5,339		13.3%
2025 (est.)	5,652	▲	5.9%
U.S. Decennial Census

=== Racial and ethnic composition ===
Hollywood town, South Carolina – Racial and ethnic composition Note: the US Census treats Hispanic/Latino as an ethnic category. This table excludes Latinos from the racial categories and assigns them to a separate category. Hispanics/Latinos may be of any race.
Race / Ethnicity (NH = Non-Hispanic)	Pop 2000	Pop 2010	Pop 2020	% 2000	% 2010	% 2020
White alone (NH)	1,150	1,868	2,482	29.14%	39.63%	46.49%
Black or African American alone (NH)	2,703	2,598	2,399	68.50%	55.11%	44.93%
Native American or Alaska Native alone (NH)	6	9	8	0.15%	0.19%	0.15%
Asian alone (NH)	4	15	27	0.10%	0.32%	0.51%
Native Hawaiian or Pacific Islander alone (NH)	0	2	4	0.00%	0.04%	0.07%
Other race alone (NH)	1	0	10	0.03%	0.00%	0.19%
Mixed race or Multiracial (NH)	14	32	129	0.35%	0.68%	2.42%
Hispanic or Latino (any race)	68	190	280	1.72%	4.03%	5.24%
Total	3,946	4,714	5,339	100.00%	100.00%	100.00%

=== 2020 census ===
As of the 2020 United States census, there were 5,339 people, 2,070 households, and 1,405 families residing in the town.

=== 2000 census ===
As of the census of 2000, there were 3,946 people, 1,392 households, and 1,056 families residing in the town. The population density was 196.8 inhabitants per square mile (76.0/km^{2}). There were 1,516 housing units at an average density of 75.6 per square mile (29.2/km^{2}). The racial makeup of the town was 68.78% African American, 29.78% White, 0.15% Native American, 0.10% Asian, 0.03% Pacific Islander, 0.79% from other races, and 0.38% from two or more races. Hispanic or Latino of any race were 1.72% of the population.

There were 1,392 households, out of which 32.0% had children under the age of 18 living with them, 48.2% were married couples living together, 23.0% had a female householder with no husband present, and 24.1% were non-families. 20.7% of all households were made up of individuals, and 8.1% had someone living alone who was 65 years of age or older. The average household size was 2.83 and the average family size was 3.30.

In the town, the population was spread out, with 29.5% under the age of 18, 7.6% from 18 to 24, 26.3% from 25 to 44, 26.3% from 45 to 64, and 10.3% who were 65 years of age or older. The median age was 37 years. For every 100 females, there were 86.4 males. For every 100 females age 18 and over, there were 83.9 males.

The median income for a household in the town was $30,297, and the median income for a family was $35,406. Males had a median income of $29,306 versus $20,115 for females. The per capita income for the town was $17,521. About 18.7% of families and 22.4% of the population were below the poverty line, including 31.3% of those under age 18 and 32.0% of those age 65 or over.

== Government ==
The city is run by an elected mayor-council government system.

=== Council members ===
Annette Sausser, Handy Miles Jr., Althea Salters, Michelle Heyward Dunmeyer, and Herbert Townsend.

Former: Kenneth L. Smalls Sr.
