= John Wood =

John Wood may refer to:

== Architecture ==
- John Wood, the Elder (1704–1754), English architect
- John Wood, the Younger (1728–1782), English architect
- J. A. Wood (1837–1910), American architect

== Education ==
- John Wood (mathematician) (c.1775–1822), American professor of mathematics
- John Wood (design theorist) (born 1945), British professor of design
- John C. Wood (born 1949), British professor of mathematics
- John Cunningham Wood (born 1952), Australian professor of economics
- John Wood (activist) (born 1963/1964), education activist, marketing director at Microsoft
- Sir John Wood (professor of law) (1928–2014), British law professor

== Entertainment ==
=== Acting ===
- John Wood (actor, born 1909) (1909–1965), Australian actor
- John Wood (actor, born 1946), Australian actor who appeared in the police drama Blue Heelers
- John Wood (English actor) (1930–2011), Shakespearean actor
- Mrs. John Wood (1831–1915), British actor
- John Wood, birth name of actor John Fortune (1939–2013)

=== Other entertainment ===
- John Wood (artist) (1922–2012), American artist
- John Wood (director), pseudonym of Spanish film director Juan Bosch (1925–2015)
- John Wood (poet) (1947–2022), American poet and historian of photography
- John Wood (music producer), English record producer
- John Philip Wood (died 1838), Scottish antiquary and biographer
- John Muir Wood (1805–1892), Scottish musician, piano manufacturer, and photographer
- John George Wood (1827–1889), British natural history writer
- John Warrington Wood (1839–1886), British sculptor

== Military ==
- John M. Wood (general), US Air Force major general
- John Augustus Wood (1818–1878), British soldier, Victoria Cross recipient
- John Shirley Wood (1888–1966), US Army general
- John Taylor Wood (1830–1904), U.S. Navy, Confederate Navy

== Politics ==
=== United States ===
- John Atwood (colonial administrator) (1576–1644), also known as John Wood, assistant governor of the Plymouth Colony
- John Wood (Florida politician) (born 1952), member of the Florida House of Representatives
- John Wood (Illinois politician) (1798–1880), governor of Illinois
- John Wood (Pennsylvania politician) (1816–1898), U.S. representative from Pennsylvania
- John F. Wood Jr. (1936–2023), member of the Maryland House of Delegates
- John J. Wood (1784–1874), U.S. representative from New York
- John M. Wood (politician) (1813–1864), U.S. representative from Maine
- John Stephens Wood (1885–1968), chairman of the House Un-American Activities Committee
- John Travers Wood (1878–1954), U.S. representative from Idaho
- John William Wood (1855–1928), North Carolina state representative
- John H. Wood Jr. (1916–1976), district judge of the US District Court for the Western District of Texas

=== United Kingdom ===
- John Wood (MP for Ipswich), English MP for Ipswich in 1420
- John Wood (died 1458), English MP for Worcester and Worcestershire
- John Wood I of Keele, English MP for Newcastle-under-Lyme
- John Wood II of Keele, English MP for Newcastle-under-Lyme
- Sir John Wood (speaker) (died 1484), English MP and Speaker of the House of Commons
- John Wood (Scottish courtier) (died 1570), secretary to Regent Moray
- John Wood (MP for Bossiney) (died 1623), English MP for Bossiney
- John Wood (Isle of Man governor) (1722–1777), Governor of the Isle of Man, 1761–1777
- John Wood (MP for Preston) (1789–1856), British MP for Preston and civil servant
- Sir John Wood, 1st Baronet (1857–1951), British Member of Parliament
- John Graeme Wood (1933–2007), British Peoples Party
- Sir John Wood (civil servant, born 1870) (1870–1933), civil servant in the Indian Civil Service

=== Elsewhere ===
- John Wood (Australian politician) (1829–1914), Victorian and Tasmanian Legislative Assemblies
- John Fisher Wood (1852–1899), Canadian Member of Parliament from Ontario
- John Wood (diplomat) (born 1944), New Zealand diplomat
- John George Corry Wood (1869–1943), English-born political figure in British Columbia

== Science ==
- John Wood (surgeon) (1825–1891), British surgeon at King's College Hospital
- John Henry Wood (1841–1914), English entomologist
- John L. Wood (born 1961), American chemist
- John Medley Wood (1827–1915), South African botanist
- John Nicholas Wood, British neurobiologist
- John Turtle Wood (1821–1890), British architect, engineer, and archaeologist

== Sports ==
=== Cricket ===
- John Wood (Surrey cricketer, born 1744) (1744–1793), English cricketer
- John Wood (Kent cricketer, born 1745) (1745–1816), English cricketer
- John Wood (New Zealand cricketer) (1839–1909), New Zealand cricketer
- John Wood (Australian cricketer) (1865–1928), Australian cricketer
- John Wood (civil servant, born 1870) (1870–1933), English cricketer
- John Wood (cricketer, born 1970), English cricketer

=== Football ===
- John Thomas Archer Wood (c. 1872–1954), English footballer
- John Wood (footballer, born 1880) (1880–1916), English footballer
- John Wood (footballer, born 1884) (1884–1959), English footballer
- John Wood (footballer, born 1948), English footballer
- John Wood (Scottish footballer) (1894–1971), Scottish forward
- John Wood (American football) (born 1951), American football player
- Jackie Wood (1919–1993), real name Edward John Wood, footballer

=== Other sports ===
- John Wood (baseball) (1872–1929), baseball player
- John Wood (canoeist) (1950–2013), Canadian Olympic flatwater canoer
- John Wood (racing driver, born 1952), CART driver
- John Wood (racing driver, born 1962), American racing driver
- John Wood (rugby league) (born 1956), Great Britain, and Leigh

== Other ==
- John Wood (cormorant keeper), servant of James VI and I
- John Wood (millowner) (1758–?), created the Howard Town Mills complex in Glossop, England
- John Wood (Bradford manufacturer) (1793–1871), English industrialist and factory reformer
- John Wood (explorer) (1812–1871), Scottish explorer of central Asia
- John B. Wood (1827–1884), American journalist
- John Page Wood (1796–1866), English cleric and baronet
- John H. Wood Jr. (1916–1979), U.S. federal judge
- John Wood (photographer) (1838–1901), Civil War photographer for Union Army
- John Wood, subject of Finders Keepers (2015 film)
- John D Wood & Co., a UK estate agents

== See also ==
- Jonathan Wood (disambiguation)
- John Woods (disambiguation)
