= Hamptons (estate agent) =

Estate agent based in London

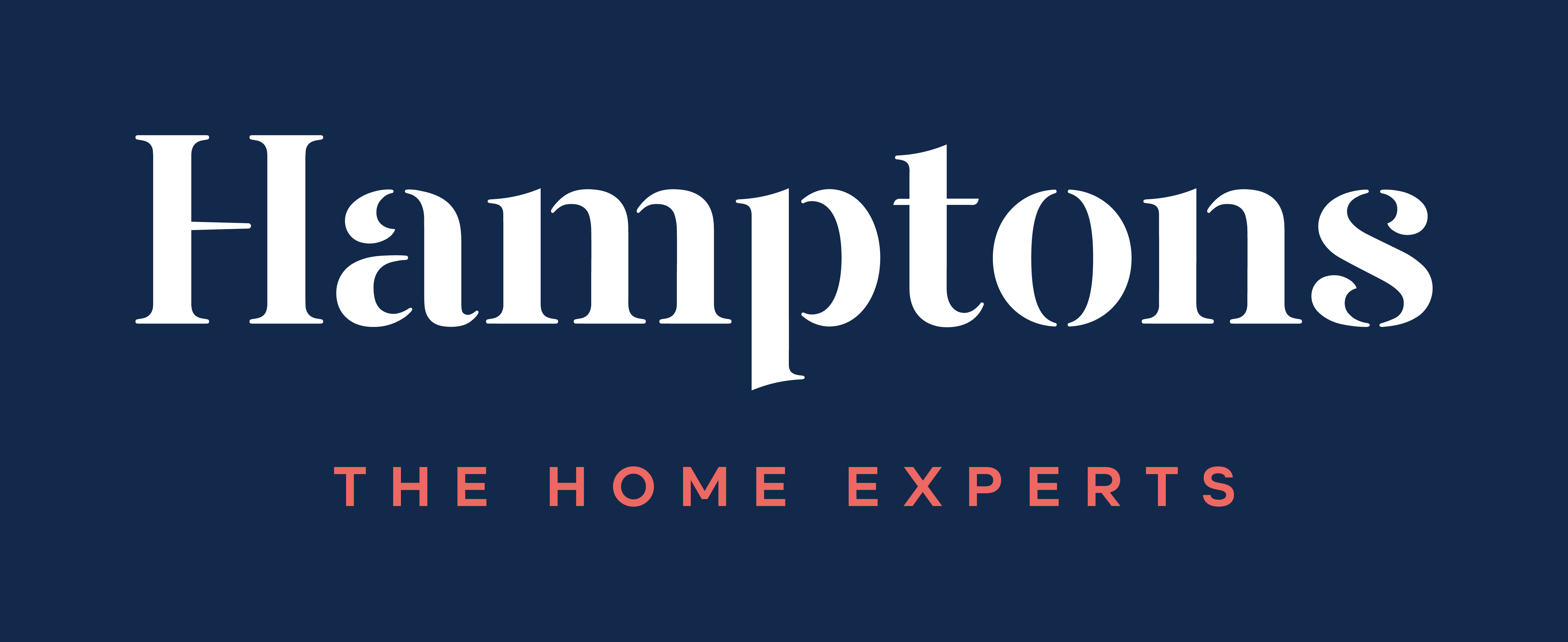

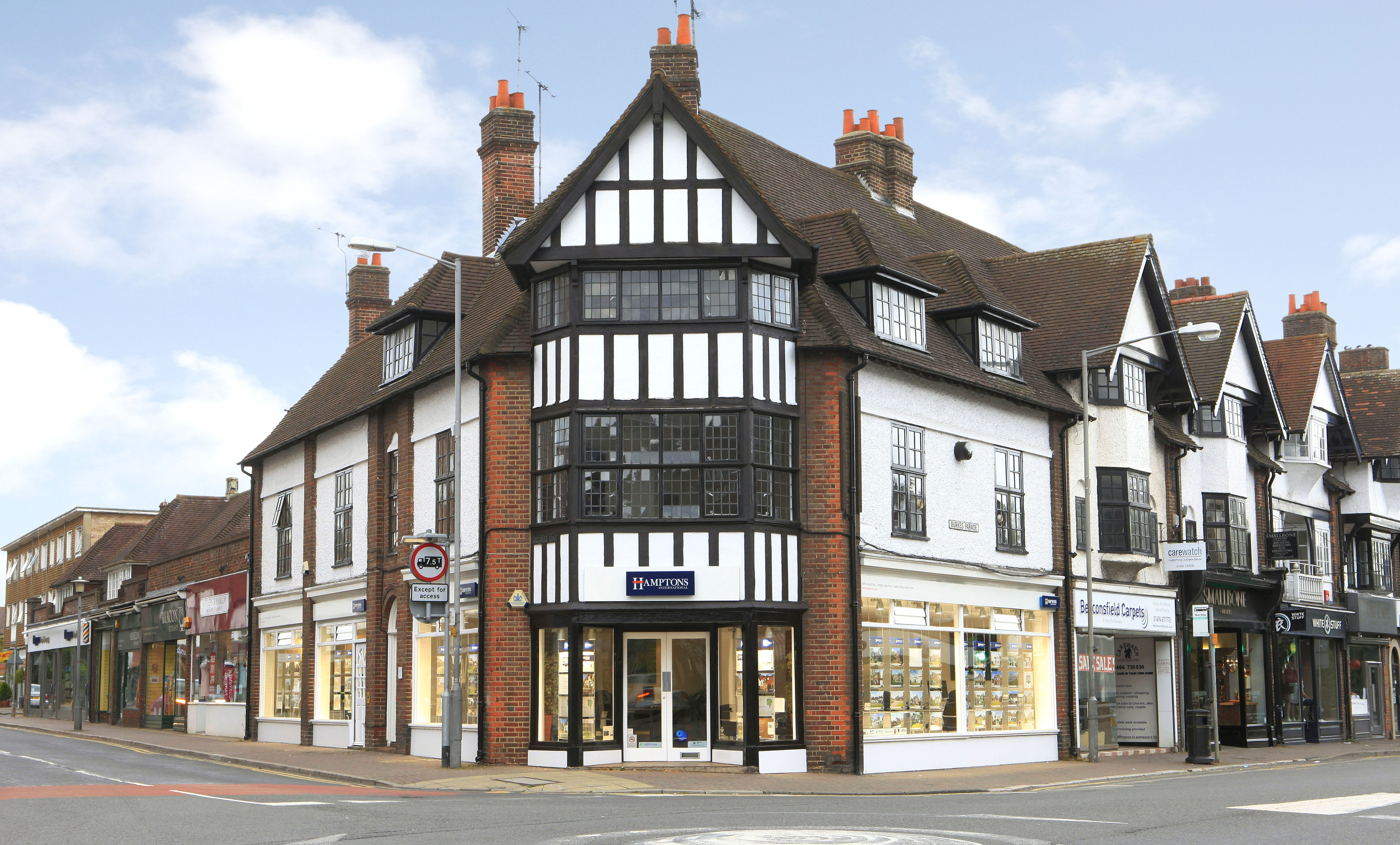
- Branch in Beaconsfield, UK
- Type: Subsidiary
- Industry: Real estate
- Founded: 1869; 157 years ago
- Founder: William Hampton
- Headquarters: London, United Kingdom
- Area served: United Kingdom
- Services: Residential sales and lettings
- Parent: Connells Group
- Website: www.hamptons.co.uk

Hamptons is a British estate agent (real estate broker) that has a UK network of more than 85 branches and an international affiliate partner network of over 7,000 offices. Hamptons' parent company, Countrywide, was acquired by The Connells Group in April 2021.

== History ==
=== Establishment and early years ===
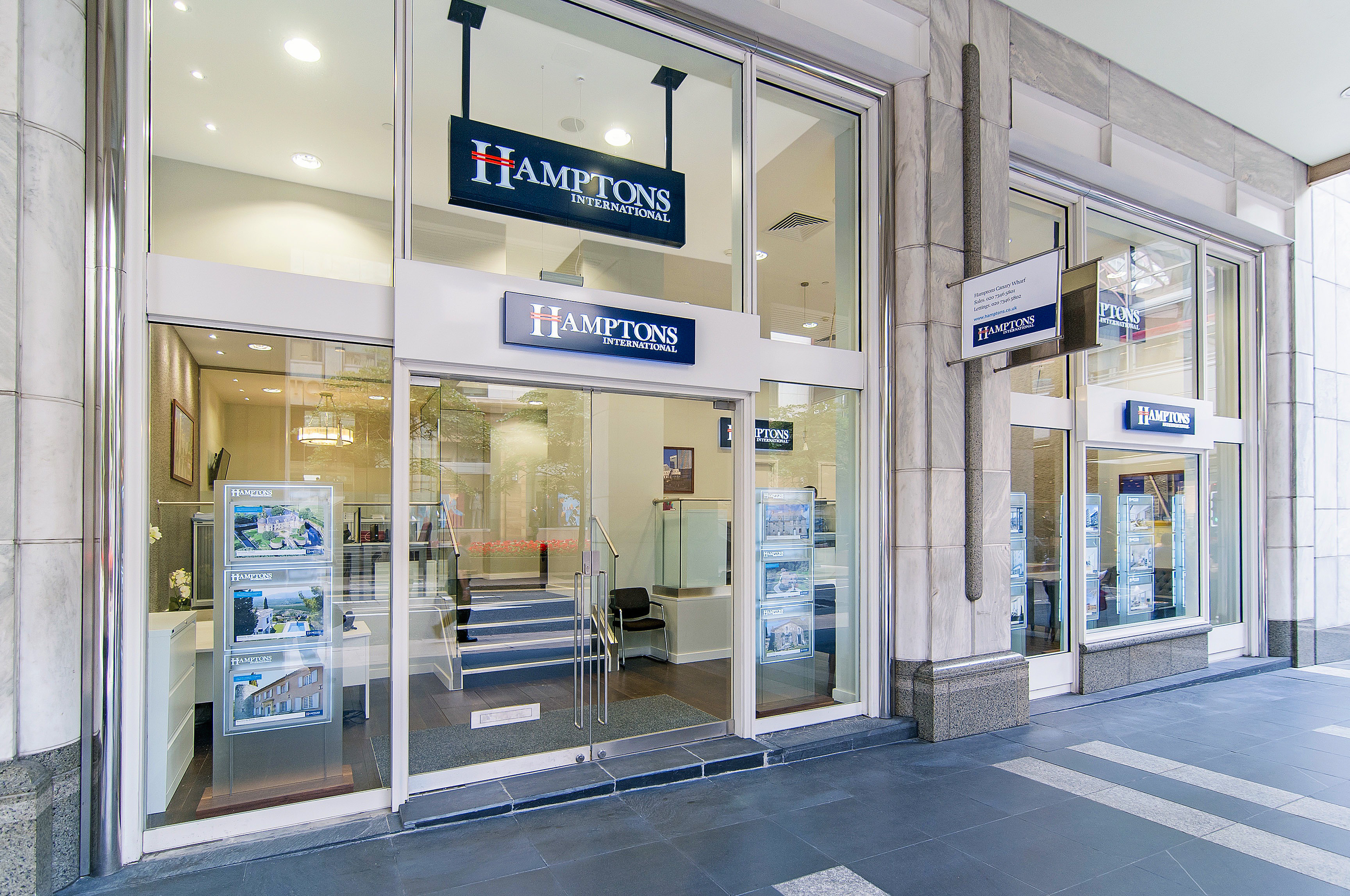
Branch at Canary Wharf, UK

The business was established in 1830 by William Hampton who started his career with a furniture shop on Cranbourn Street, London. Hampton was later joined by his sons George and William Powell, with his grandsons Harold, Fred and Clarence also later joining the firm.

In 1869 the firm created new premises at 8 Pall Mall East and 1–3 Dorset Place (now Whitcomb Street). In 1890, the firm's records were almost totally destroyed in a fire which broke out in their offices. As a result, a new estate office was provided and staff moved to offices at 1 Cockspur Street. A limited company was created with George Hampton as chairman and managing director. In 1900, a satellite office was opened on Wimbledon Common. As the firm continued to expand, it took over control of a number of other firms, beginning with James Coulson and Co of Lisburn, Northern Ireland in 1898, and in the early 1950s Goodall, Lamb and Highway of King Street, Manchester and Robson and Sons Ltd of Newcastle upon Tyne.

In 1920, Hampton & Sons', Estate Agents & Auctioneers, moved to 20 St James's Square, London W.1. During the 1920s, the successful auction house arm was involved in the sale of, amongst other things, the Michelham Collection in 1926 (when the record auction price of 74,000 guineas was achieved for the painting 'Pinkie' by Sir Thomas Lawrence) and the Cameroon Islands. In 1926 the firm opened a factory at Ingate Place, Battersea close to the firm's existing depository. Amongst the firm's notable contracts were the liners RMS Queen Elizabeth, RMS Queen Mary, Theatre Royal Drury Lane, Duke of York's Theatre, The Dorchester and The May Fair Hotels and the palaces of two Indian princes, that of the Nizam of Hyderabad and of the Maharajah of Kashmir.

Having sold their St James's Square premises to The Distillers Company, in 1936 the Estate Office moved to the former French embassy building on Arlington Street, and by 1953 boasted further offices in Kensington, Wimbledon, Bournemouth and Bishops Stortford. During at least the 1940s, the parent company was listed on the Stock Market.

=== World War and 1950s ===
On the night of 16 November 1940 an incendiary bomb hit the Pall Mall premises and the greater part of the building was destroyed. Temporary one-storeyed buildings were erected on the site but these were eventually demolished in 1957 following the sale of the site to the Canadian Government. In October 1940 the firm had acquired a controlling interest in the firm of Storey & Co Ltd of Kensington High Street and it was there that the firm established its new headquarters.

Between February 13 and February 22, 1950, Hampton and Sons auctioned off the fittings of the luxury liner RMS Aquitania in Shed 108 at Southampton. In 1952, the furniture side of the firm was involved, at a cost of £68,357, in the restoration of the Council Chamber of The Town Hall, Richmond (damaged during World War II), and at the same time were involved in the fitting out of the Royal Yacht Britannia

On 1 January 1957 the Estate Agency was purchased from the parent company (by now Camp Bird Limited, who had acquired Hampton & Sons' Limited around the same time) when a partnership was formed by the founder's grandson, Mr PWP Hampton (the furniture store in Kensington was sold by Camp Bird in March 1959). By 1963 the firm comprised the offices at Arlington Street, and two further offices (one in Wimbledon and one in Mayfield).

=== Acquisition 1986 ===
By late 1986 discussions were underway for the business to be purchased by Abaco Investments, a company led by Peter Goldie. The purchase was completed in 1987 for a sum of over £15 million. Abaco had taken over the commercial agency Lambert Smith & Partners for £12.6m in 1986 and this firm was amalgamated with Hamptons.

During the 1980s there was a period of expansion and acquisition, with a number of historic firms being purchased and rebranded as Hamptons. These included Christopher Rowland, Messenger May & Baverstock (with 10 offices in Surrey and Hampshire, purchased by Abaco for £5.32 million in July 1986), Levens (established in 1870, purchased February 1987 for £5.63 million), Giddy & Giddy (24 branches across Berkshire, Surrey, Oxfordshire and Buckinghamshire, purchased in March 1987 for £7.5 million), Dennis Pocock & Drewett, one of the largest independent estate agents in Wiltshire for £4 million in June 1987, Taylor Dixon Porter (whose seven offices in West London were purchased for £3.5 million in August 1987) and WH Robinson of Manchester just a day later for £3.4 million. By this time Abaco held 110 estate agency branches. Further acquisitions followed in 1987 with the addition of Anthony Brown Stewart and Eadon Lockwood & Riddle. In January 1988 Lambert Smith and Partners was rebranded and relaunched to become Lambert Smith Hampton.

After an aborted bid in the latter part of 1987 which was cancelled due to the stock market collapse, British and Commonwealth Holdings took control of the 70.1% of Abaco Investments it did not already own in 1988, in a bid worth 72 pence per share. By this time Peter Goldie had been appointed Chief Executive of British and Commonwealth and therefore he took no part in negotiations over the takeover of Abaco. In February 1989, Hamptons acquired the residential agency business of Halls Residential and the business of Neale and Aldridge. From early 1989 the company centralised accounting and administration functions with the regional administration offices of the predecessor partnerships being closed and responsibility transferred to a new central administration department in Guildford. Whilst this transition was not without its issues, by early 1990 the problems were resolved.

=== Financial problems 1990s ===
British and Commonwealth went into administration in June 1990 and despite the directors having assembled a management buyout, Hamptons was purchased by Bristol and West Building Society in September 1990. Lambert Smith Hampton was subject to a management buyout in early 1991 for a price tag of £5 million.

Due to difficult trading conditions, the company announced at the beginning of 1993 its plan to close some of its branches during the course of the year. These plans continued with 25 further branches closing during 1995.

In February 1996, Hamptons was purchased by Cluttons London Residential Agency (CLRA) for £3.8million and the Hong Kong operations of the combined company were renamed Cluttons-Hamptons in April 1996. There followed a programme of branch refurbishments and computerisation during the rest of 1996, with the board reporting at year end that "turnover and profit exceeded the Board's expectations".

With the acquisitions of the 1980s the Hamptons business came to include two fine art auction rooms at Godalming (ex Messenger May & Baverstock) and Marlborough (ex Dennis Pocock & Son) and these traded as Hamptons Fine Arts. Hamptons Fine Arts was purchased from the firm in January 2005 by The Fine Art Auction Group joining their existing businesses Dreweatt Neate Fine Art and Neales of Nottingham. Hamptons director Richard Madley joined TFAAG's board and continued to run the Godalming and Marlborough salerooms which were rebranded as Dreweatt Neate after what the group called "a period of settling in". The rebranded Marlborough and Godalming salerooms were subsequently closed in 2006

In 2005 Hamptons International was purchased by Wheelock Properties (Singapore) Limited. In August 2006, the global real estate giant, Emaar Properties bought Hamptons International for £104 million.

=== Acquisition by Countrywide ===
In June 2010, Hamptons International's UK, European, Asian and Latin American businesses were acquired by Countrywide Plc, Emaar retained the Middle East and North African businesses. Earlier in 2010, Hamptons had launched a valuations business led by Nigel Macdonald.

In January 2014, Hamptons acquired the north London and Home Counties estate agency Preston Bennett which specialised in high end properties as well as having planning, land and development services departments. This was followed in June with the purchase of Humphreys Skitt & Co, a firm founded in 1793, and the purchase of the letting business of Humberts in July of the same year. Further acquisitions over the coming years included the firm of John Curtis in Hertfordshire and Ikon in East London, both in March 2015, Greene & Co/Urban Spaces of North West London in May 2015 and Patterson Bowe of West London in March 2016.

=== 150th year anniversary ===
In 2019 Hamptons International celebrated their 150th anniversary.

In January 2021, Hamptons International unveiled a brand refresh and a new master strapline: 'The Home Experts'. With over 100,000 overseas listings in 29 locations, Hamptons’ international division sits alongside sales, lettings, and new homes.

Following the brand refresh, in April 2021, Hamptons' parent company, Countrywide, was acquired by Connells Group, to create the UK's largest estate agency group.

== Operations ==
The company has a UK network of over 85 offices and a network of 40 trusted affiliate partners worldwide.

== International Department ==
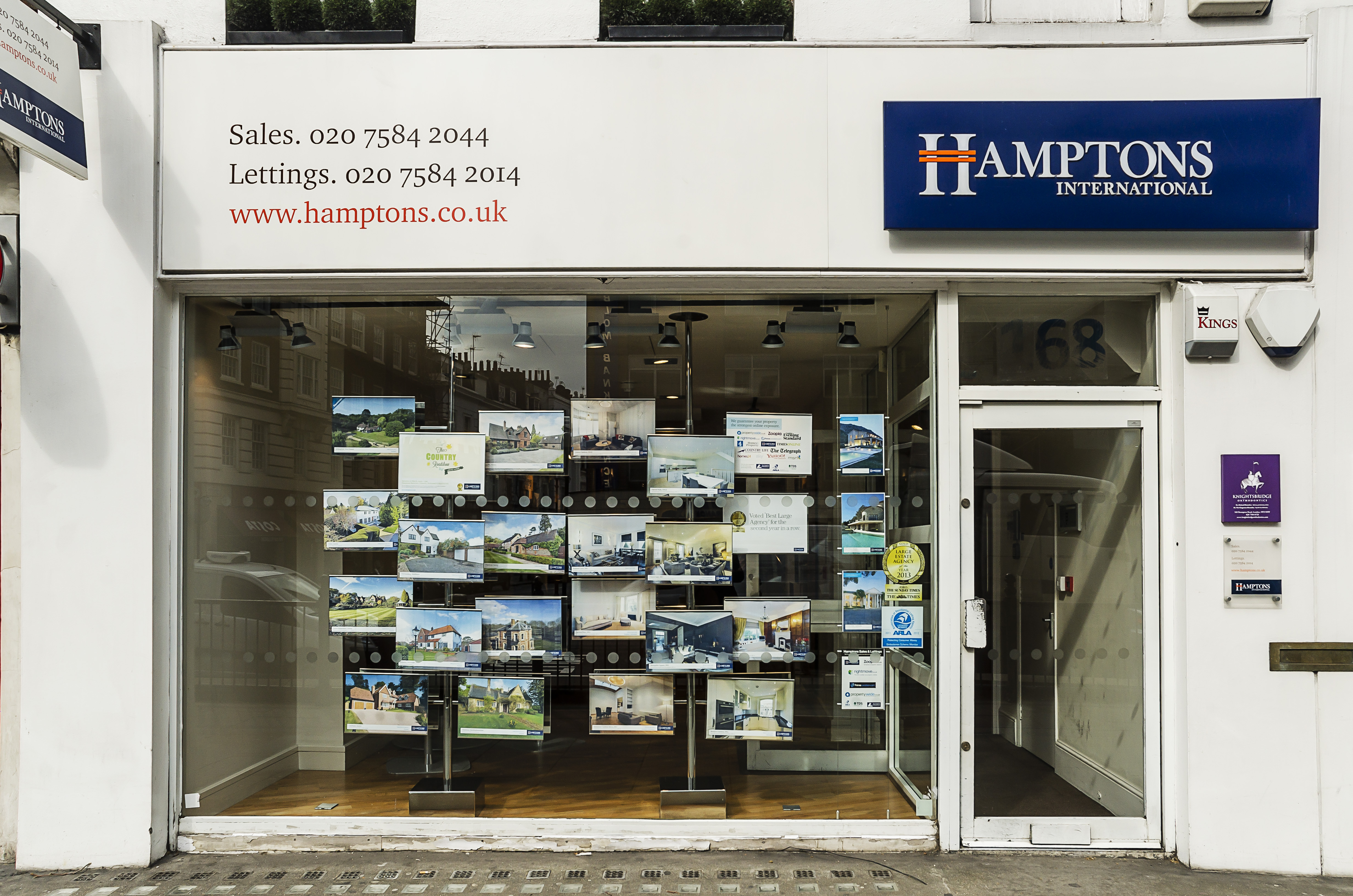
Branch in Knightsbridge, UK

Hamptons operates an International Department that focuses on overseas residential property markets. The department collaborates with a network of 40 international real estate agencies and partners, assisting clients interested in purchasing property outside the United Kingdom. Its activities include the marketing of residential properties and cross border real estate services in various international destinations, including Europe, Africa, Caribbean, and the Middle East.

== See also ==
- Connells Group
- Countrywide
