= Chestertons =

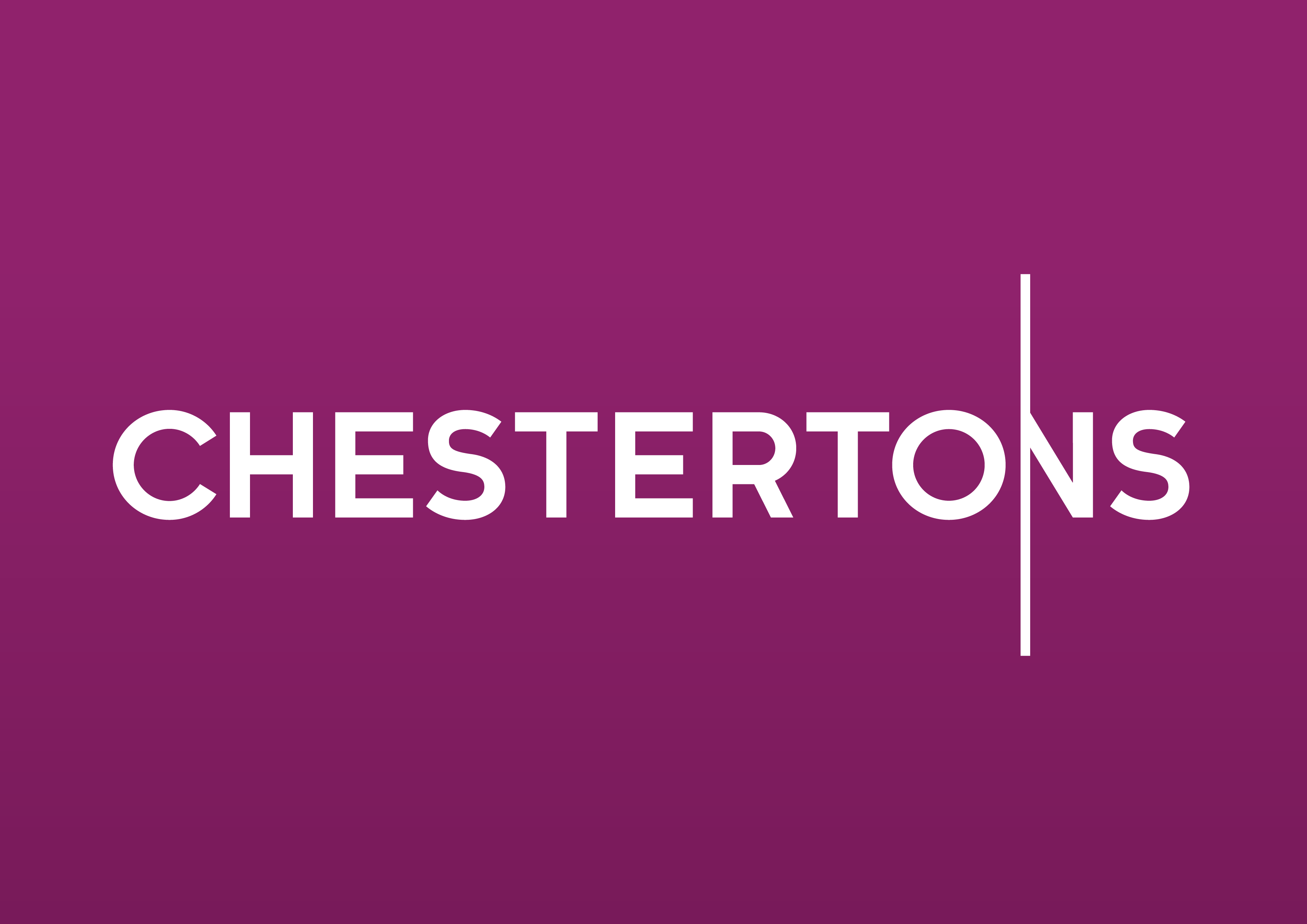
- Industry: Estate agents
- Founded: 1805; 221 years ago
- Founder: Charles Chesterton
- Headquarters: 40 Connaught Street, London, England
- Key people: Richard Davies Managing Director
- Products: Residential property services
- Number of employees: 500+
- Website: www.chestertons.co.uk

Chestertons is a British estate agency chain.

First established in 1805 by Charles Chesterton (1779 – 1849), the firm has mainly been based in London, but has expanded into international markets, including the Middle East. Chestertons has over 100 offices in 21 countries.

== History ==
1805: Charles Chesterton established the company; became the agent for Phillimore Estate in Kensington, an agent for the Phoenix Insurance Group (now part of Royal & Sun Alliance), a churchwarden, and a prominent figure in the Kensington vestry.
1830: Charles's son Arthur Chesterton ensured succession, establishing Chesterton & Sons with his sons Edward & Sidney Rawlins; ownership remained in the family until 1980.
1929: Chestertons was involved in the valuations of three famous Kensington High Street stores: Derry & Toms, Pontings, and Barkers.
1965: Sir Henry Wells was the first of two Chestertons executives to serve as the president of the RICS.
1968: Sir Oliver Chesterton, the last direct member of the Chestertons family, became the second of two executives to serve as the president of RICS
1986 Chesterton sold Chestertons Residential to Prudential plc
1987 Chesterton merged with rivals from Birmingham (Colliers Bigwood and Bewlay) and Bristol to become Chesterton International
1991 Chesterton International became a limited company after 186 years as a partnership
1992 Chesterton International returned to the residential market acquiring De Groot Collis for £2.416 million, Elliot Son & Boyton and Brian Rushton were also acquired in this year
1993 Despite "probably the most difficult year that the property industry in the UK has experienced since the 1950s", Chesterton continued its acquisitions with the Manchester office merging with Guest Shaw, the acquisition of John E Mitchell heralding the opening of a Nottingham office and the purchase of John Hubbard, and Pollock & Buchan bolstering the company's presence respectively in the North East of England and London
1994 Chesterton International gained a listing on the London Stock Exchange and acquired Conroy Hunter in Scotland, Consolidated FPM Group Goddard and Smith, and quantity surveyors; Cyril Sweett
1995 Hall Pain & Foster and Bell-Ingram acquired
1996 Chesterton International reacquired Chestertons Residential for £8 million from Woolwich Property Services which had purchased the firm from Prudential in 1991. After disappointing results, the company made several changes to its senior management with Chief Executive Giles Ballantine stepping down and the appointment of Ian Fleming as finance director, who joined from Wimpey Homes. In order to grow the business Chesterton acquired Workplace Management from ICL, British Gas Properties Facilities Management Limited from British Gas plc and became a founding partner in Exchequer Partnership plc a special purpose vehicle formed along with Bovis Ltd, Stanhope plc, Chelsfield plc and Hambros Bank to bid for the PFI contract for the refurbishment of Government Offices Great George Street, London to house HM Treasury.
1997 The group reported a £7 million trading loss for the year, resulting in disposals of: part of the residential property management business, the plant and machinery business, withdrawal from the joint brokerage business in the US, the sale of the holding in the joint US mortgage advisory venture, the sale of the only Chestertons Residential office outside of London (in Henley-on-Thames), and the restructure of the French, Spanish and Thai businesses. Despite Exchequer Partnership plc being named as the preferred bidder, negotiations regarding refurbishing the Treasury buildings were terminated due to the financial risks to the government
1998 A merger with The Summit Group plc was announced in February 1998, however by year end this had been abandoned at a cost of £414,000. The group posted pre-tax losses of £2.1 million and further disposals ensued including the disposal of Cyril Sweett Quantity Surveyors, Carter Primo Chesterton (a US asset management business), Residential Property Management (block management), Chesterton Netherlands and Chesterton Binswanger Capital Advisors. In addition Chesterton y Associados in Spain was closed, as was Chesterton Thai. Negotiations between Exchequer Partnership and HM Treasury restarted
1999 The group posted a pre-tax profit of £4 million, as opposed to a loss in previous years, and launched Chesterton Structured Finance and Chesterton Facilities and Property Partnering, the latter to build on the company's position as a market leader in PFI
2000 In May 2000 the contract for the refurbishment of Government Offices Great George Street was signed by Exchequer Partnership plc (by now consisting of Chesterton, Bovis Lend Lease and Stanhope), for commencement on site in July 2000, with a scheduled completion date of August 2002
2001 During the year the firm acquired Dixon Studd and expanded its residential operations to operate for the first time outside London
2002 Further residential operations were commenced in Newcastle and Manchester, continuing the expansion of these operations outside the capital. After disappointing results in 2001 and a loss in 2002, the company announced in May 2002 a preliminary approach to purchase the company. If an offer were not forthcoming it was advised that the company would look to go private and de-list from the Stock Exchange
2003 Chesterton International was, after a long and colourful battle including the withdrawal of a bid from a listed company, the sacking of the Chief Executive and Chief Operating Officer and a 'spoiler' bid from Manchester & Metropolitan, taken over by Phoenix Acquisitions, a vehicle of Mohammed Jafari-Fini with the company being delisted from the Stock Exchange in July 2003. As a backdrop to this, the company posted a £14.8 million pre-tax loss for the year. In the latter part of the year the company sold its Facilities Management division to Johnson Service Group and its share in Exchequer Partnerships to other partners Stanhope and Bovis Lend Lease.
2004 Mohammad Jafari-Fini lost control of Chesterton International due to the default on a loan by Phoenix Acquisitions, and this default saw Resurge plc which lent Phoenix £12.86 million for the acquisition of Chesterton take control of the company. It later transpired, as a result of a High Court ruling in 2006, that the default was due to a payment by Jafari-Fini which was said by the court to be a bribe. Chesterton reduced losses to £4.4 million for the year.
2005: Chesterton International was placed into receivership by Royal Bank of Scotland. Part of the commercial arm of the company was sold to Atisreal UK (a subsidiary of BNP Paribas) which bought the commercial offices in the City of London, Southampton, Cardiff, Newcastle and Leeds. The Chesterton brand stayed with the residential division which was purchased as a 16 office strong operation focused on central London by a joint venture between Vincent Tchenguiz, Credit Mercantile Group and CIC International. The cost was £900,000 for the company and £3.1 million set aside for liabilities.
2006: Robert Bartlett was hired as Chief Executive. Despite a first year loss, results for 2006 showed a return to profit and saw the company adopt a new visual identity, commence the refurbishment of its flagship Kensington branch, open a new branch in Hampstead, and invest in its IT systems and website.
2007 Arqaam, formerly CIC International, and part of the Saudi Arabian Commercial Investment Corporation sold its stake in Chesterton to Vincent Tchenquiz and Credit Mercantile Group. Chesterton Global purchased Millest & Partners (located in Sevenaoks, the firm's first branch outside London), Copping Joyce, Stickley & Kent, Moss Kaye Pemberton (marking a return for the company to commercial agency) and building surveyor Vann and Jones. During the summer of 2007 the company also expanded internationally, opening its first European office in St Tropez with offices and Gibraltar and Italy following.
2008 The company posted its third loss in four years, this year's loss being the result of the 2008 financial crisis In December 2008, Mercantile purchased Vincent Tchenquiz's stake, giving it full ownership of Chesterton. Mercantile had previously bought the 34-strong chain of Humberts (founded in 1842) out of administration, along with 10 branches of its Farleys and Wellingtons chains in June of the same year for £3.16 million. The move to take full ownership of Chesterton gave it a complimentary wider ownership within the sector.
2009: Chestertons merged with Humberts (bringing together two of the longest established firms in the industry), and the business was rebranded as Chesterton Humberts. The firm acquired a former franchised operation of two branches in the South East of England, strengthening its representation in this geographic area.
2011 Chesterton Global acquired Nottingham based chartered surveying firm Robert Clarke to strengthen its commercial business, along with opening new offices in Kew, Italy and Barbados
2012 New offices were opened in St John's Wood and Kensington within the UK, with overseas offices in Malta, Nice and Liguria being opened, along with an expansion of operations in Dubai
2013: A decision was made by the board to split Chesterton Humberts into two separate brands, with Chestertons retaining the Farleys business.
2014: The London and international business were officially rebranded as Chestertons, and the new brand wes launched at Chestertons Polo in the Park. The company also launched its Chestertons Charity Champions initiative.
2015: January - Chestertons, in conjunction with other estate agents, launched the OnTheMarket.com portal.
2018: Chestertons listed all of its properties on the largest UK property websites, including Rightmove, Zoopla, PrimeLocation.com and OnTheMarket.com
2020: February - Chestertons welcomed its first international franchisee based in Greece - Chestertons Ionian
2021: January - Chestertons expanded into Costa Del Sol - Spain with its new franchisee Chestertons Costa Del Sol February - Chestertons opened its first office in the African continent - Chestertons Morocco
2022: May - Guy Gittins stepped down as CEO and Chestertons appointed Richard Davies as Interim Managing Director
2022:November - John Ennis joined Chestertons as Chief Executive Officer
2023 In February Chestertons became an exclusive member of Forbes Global Properties, and was the only agency in London to have its properties featured on the Forbes Global Properties website, reaching buyers from over 450 worldwide locations. Chestertons (UK) was purchased in November 2023 by Swiss private equity and property firm Partners Group.
2023:John Ennis steps down as Chief Executive Officer
2024:Richard Davies appointed Managing Director
