= Fullarton Computer Industries Ltd v Central Arbitration Committee =

- Court: Court of Session
- Citation: [2001] Scot CS 168, [2001] IRLR 752

Keywords
- Trade union, collective bargaining

Fullarton Computer Industries Ltd v Central Arbitration Committee [2001] Scot CS 168 is a UK labour law case, concerning collective bargaining.

== Facts ==
Fullarton was challenging a Central Arbitration Committee decision for recognition of the Iron and Steel Trades Confederation. Fullarton had announced redundancies in October and November 2000 after an application from the ISTC for recognition. In December 2000 the ISTC applied to the Central Arbitration Committee for recognition in respect of a bargaining unit under Schedule A1 paragraph 22. CAC made a panel with a case manager, but no agreement was reached by February 2001 so the CAC decided the bargaining unit was at the relevant plant as the union proposed. Comparing the manager and the union lists, the case manager decided 49.3% of people at work were union members. The union requested reconsideration, and then it was 51.3%, so the CAC decided a ballot would not be held. Fullarton argued the case manager’s decision was ultra vires, because the CAC ought to take the decision, that it was unfair anyway because 15 new members were found and Fullarton had no way of seeing how the conclusion was reached, that even then the decision was irrational because paragraph 22(4) conditions were not given proper weight, nor was the marginal nature of the decision.

== Judgment ==
Lord Johnston in the Court of Session, Outer House, dismissed the petition, and said that although he probably would have ordered for a ballot to be taken, the decision to not have a ballot was rational. Delegating to the case manager was legitimate. Although natural justice would be violated if injustice could occur (even if it did not) when evidence showed the complaint had no effect anyway it would not be. Fullarton had conceded it would just mean that the CAC would reach the same conclusion after reconsideration anyway. Para 22(4) were exceptions there based on good industrial relations and member attitudes. But the ballot decision was not flawed and the CAC had considered each of the 3 exceptions and reached conclusions without manifest error.

== See also ==
- UK labour law
