= Jonathan Wood =

Jonathan Wood may refer to:

- Jonathan Patrick Moore, previously known as Jonathan Wood, Australian actor
- Jonathan Wood (hedge fund manager), British hedge fund manager and political donor
- J. Luke Wood (born 1982), president of Sacramento State University
- Jon Wood (born 1981), American stock car racing driver

== See also ==
- John Wood (disambiguation)
