= Alison Platt =

British businesswoman (born 1962)

- Born: Alison Elizabeth Platt; 25 February 1962 (age 64); Oldham, Greater Manchester, England
- Title: Chair, Dechra Pharmaceuticals,
- Term: March 2020 -

Alison Elizabeth Platt (born 25 February 1962) is a British businesswoman. She was the chief executive officer (CEO) of Countrywide, the UK's largest estate agency group from 2014 to January 2018.

== Personal life ==
Alison Elizabeth Platt was born on 25 February 1962 in Oldham, England. She is married, with two grown-up stepchildren and a 14-year-old son. She lives in Teddington.

== Career ==
Platt joined British Airways as a management trainee straight from school, turning down the offer of a university place. She worked there for 13 years, including as a flight attendant.

She joined BUPA in 1993 and over 20 years held a number of progressively senior roles.

She completed the Advanced Management Programme at Wharton School in 1998.

In 2014, Platt was appointed CEO of Countrywide, the UK's largest estate agency group.

She resigned in January 2018 after Countrywide issued its second profit warning in three months, and its shares fell to an all-time low; in the four years under her leadership she oversaw a drop from 300 pence per share to roughly 6 pence. Her role was taken over by the chairman Peter Long, while a successor was sought.

=== Non-executive roles ===
Platt was appointed a non-executive director of Tesco in 2016, a role she still holds.

She was a non-executive director at the Foreign and Commonwealth Office.

She was appointed non-executive director of veterinary pharmaceuticals company Dechra Pharmaceuticals plc in March 2020, becoming chair in January 2022. In June 2023, the firm agreed to a £4.5bn takeover from Swedish private equity firm EQT AB.

In October 2022, she was appointed chair of the UK subsidiary of global insurer Ageas.

In December 2023, she was announced as chair-elect at FTSE 250 wealth manager Hargreaves Lansdown replacing Deanna Oppenheimer.
