= IWGB v CAC =

United Kingdom labour case law

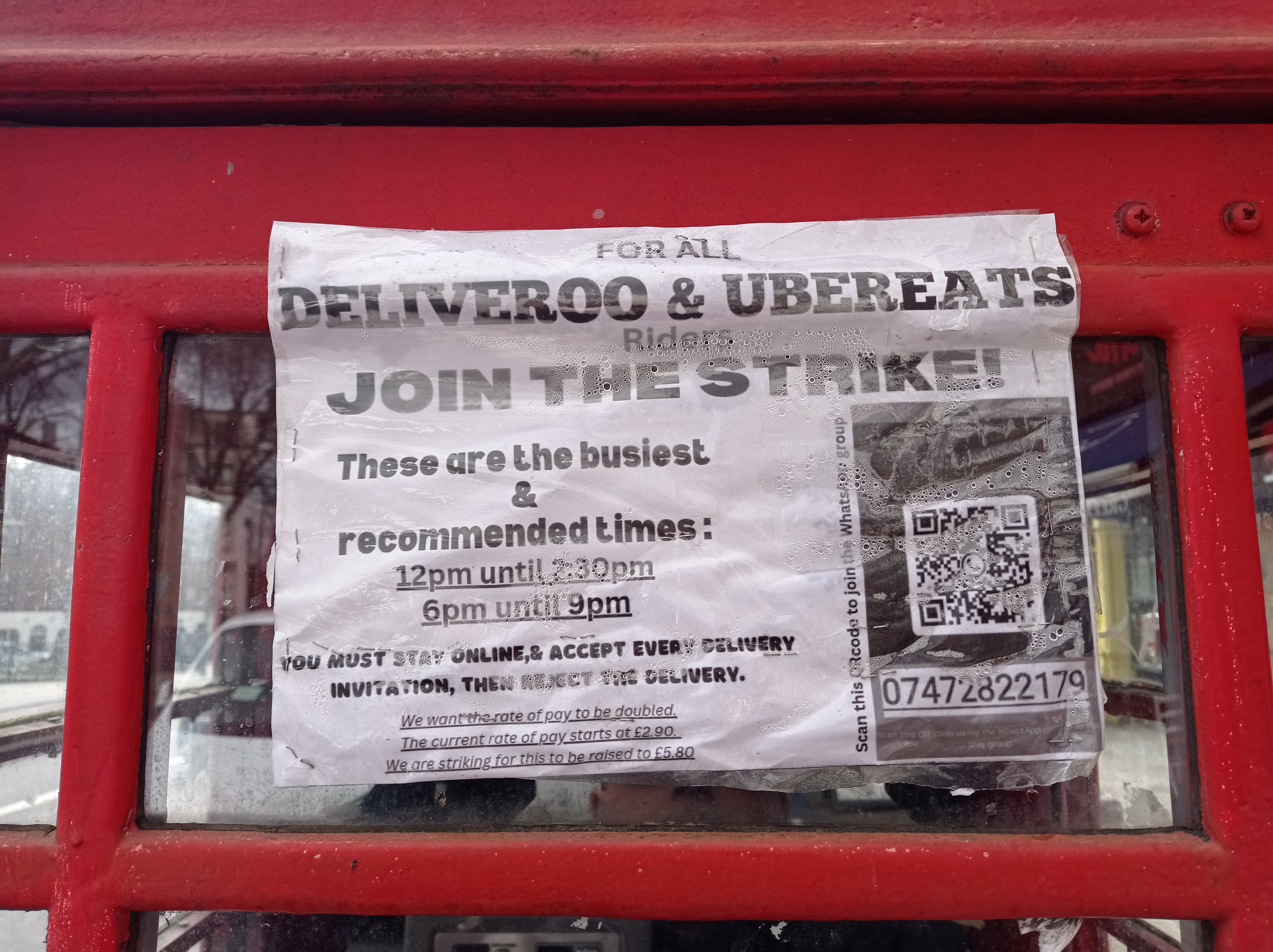
- Court: Supreme Court of the United Kingdom
- Citations: [2023] UKSC 43, [2021] EWCA Civ 952

Keywords
- Sham self-employment, union, collective bargaining

Independent Workers of Great Britain Union v Central Arbitration Committee and another [2023] UKSC 43, also referred to as the Deliveroo case, is a UK Supreme Court decision relating to labour law. It concerned whether Deliveroo riders organised by IWGB were in an employment relationship with Roofoods Ltd, trading as Deliveroo. The Supreme Court concluded that they were not, for the purposes of Article 11 of the European Convention on Human Rights.

== Facts ==
In 2016, the Independent Workers' Union of Great Britain (IWGB) filed an application with the Central Arbitration Committee for recognition as the trade union representing Deliveroo riders in the United Kingdom for collective bargaining purposes.

In the High Court, Supperstone J held the CAC was not wrong. The cyclists appealed, arguing that their rights under the European Convention of Human Rights article 11 to freely organise and associate had been violated.

== Judgment ==
=== Court of Appeal ===
The Court of Appeal held that the CAC was not wrong, and declined to follow Uber v Aslam which it said did not involve ECHR article 11. Underhill LJ gave the leading judgment. Coulson LJ and Phillips LJ agreed.

=== Supreme Court ===
The Supreme Court upheld the Court of Appeal. Lady Rose held that Deliveroo's use of a substitution clause could remove the element of "personal performance" necessary for worker status, meaning that riders had no right to recognition for collective bargaining. It was further held that the European Convention on Human Rights article 11 did not require that employers recognised unions for collective bargaining.

== Significance ==
The case weakened the protection of basic worker rights in the UK, by enabling worker status to be determined unilaterally by an employer's contract term. The decision was widely condemned by labour rights experts.

== See also ==
- UK labour law
