= John D Wood & Co. =

British estate agent company

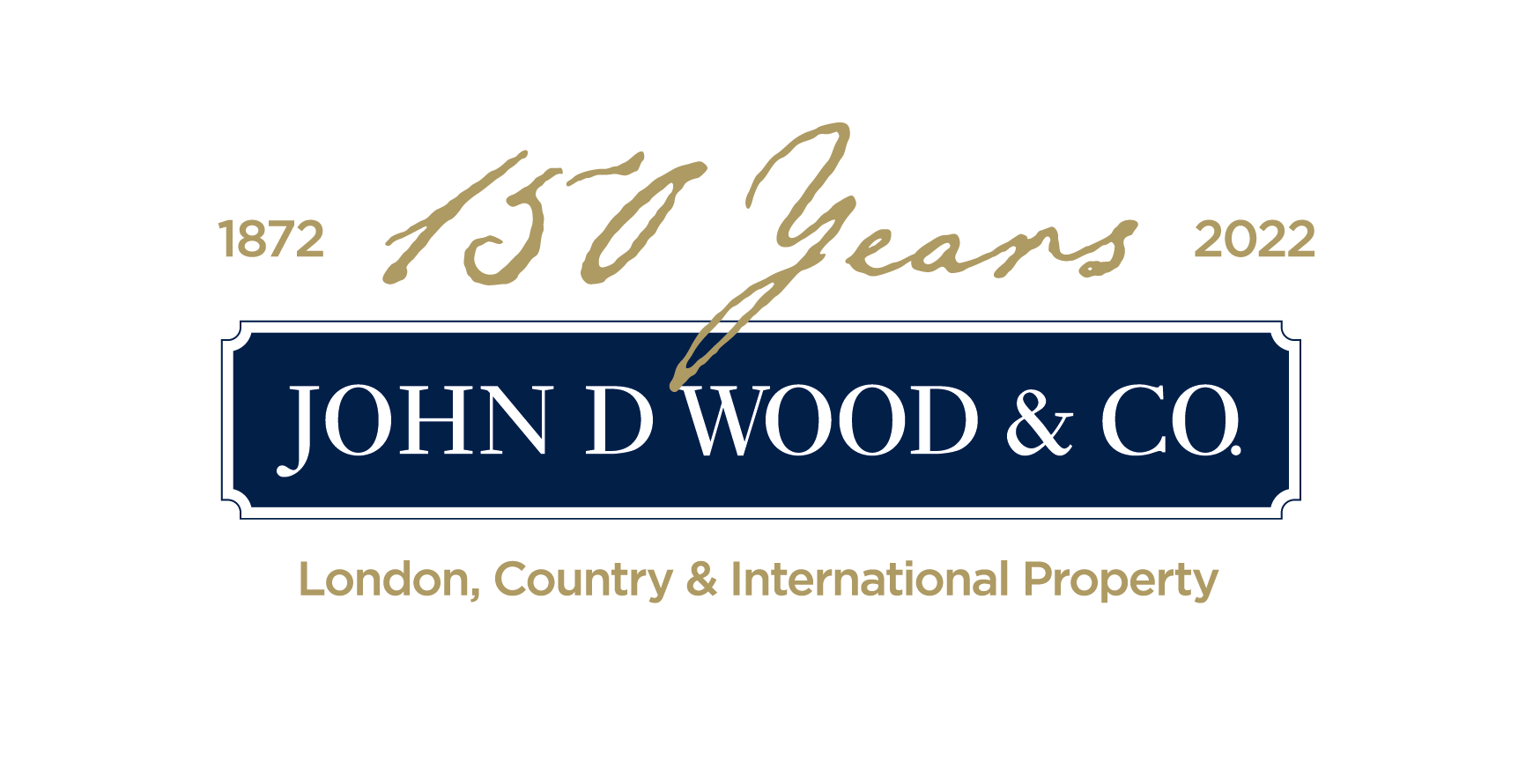
- Company type: subsidiary
- Industry: Real estate
- Founded: 1872; 154 years ago
- Headquarters: London, United Kingdom
- Key people: Polly Ogden Duffy (Managing Director)
- Number of employees: 400 (2017)
- Parent: Connells Group
- Website: www.johndwood.co.uk

John D Wood & Co. is a British estate agent business, established in London in 1872. The company provides services for buying, selling and renting houses across the UK and a number of other countries. It has a focus on the high end properties in the London suburbs and south east England. The company is a wholly owned subsidiary of Connells Group.

== History ==
John Daniel Wood founded his eponymous company opposite the Connaught Hotel in Mount Street, London, in 1872, at the age of 23. After the First World War the company regularly took instructions on great London houses and country estates, including the sale of Dorchester House, Park Lane (now the Dorchester Hotel), Leeds Castle in Kent and Parham Park in Sussex. In 1930 the company moved headquarters to Berkeley Square where the firm's headquarters remained until the late 1980s.

In 1982 the commercial and residential arms of John D Wood separated to form John D Wood & Co. (Residential and Agricultural) and John D Wood (Commercial). In 1987 the Residential and Agricultural arm floated on the London Stock Exchange, and in 1997, when its growth proved attractive to investors, the listed company was acquired by Hambro Countrywide plc. In 1998, Hambros de-merged the newly created Countrywide Assured Group plc which became the UK's largest estate agency group. In 2017, estate agent, Faron Sutaria was merged with John D Wood by its parent company Countrywide to rationalise its branch network. In March 2021, John D Wood & Co's parent company, Countrywide, was acquired by Connells Group, making Connells the UK's largest estate agency group.

== Operations ==
John D Wood & Co. has twenty-one London offices, six country offices and associated offices throughout the south of England.

== Services ==
- Investment, Sales, Acquisitions & Leasing
- Research & Consultancy
- Surveying & Legal Valuations
- Freehold / Leasehold Acquisition & Collective Enfranchisement
- Residential, Commercial & Industrial Services
- Property Management
