= Fareham College =

Location
- Bishopsfield Road; Fareham, Hampshire, PO14 1NH; England; 50°51′03″N 1°11′57″W

Information
- Established: 1982
- Local authority: South East England LSC (although in Hampshire LEA)
- Specialist: General Further Education College
- Department for Education URN: 130693 Tables
- Ofsted: Reports
- Principal: Andrew Kaye
- Staff: 140
- Gender: Coeducational
- Age: 16 to 99
- Enrolment: 1800
- Website: http://www.fareham.ac.uk

Fareham College is a further education college situated on a 22-acre (89,000 m^{2}) campus on the western side of the town of Fareham in Hampshire, England.

== History ==
Fareham College was formed in 1984 as a merger between an earlier technical college (Fareham Technical College) on the same site and the sixth-form college at the historic Price's School, a boys' grammar school on Park Lane, (before the latter's site was sold to developers), and became the sole state provider of post-16 education in Fareham (a tertiary college). Price's School became a sixth form college in 1976. Fareham Grammar School for Girls was on Birdwood Grove, and became Cams Hill School.

=== Principals ===
- Peter Watkins, Principal from 1980 to 1974 of Price's Sixth Form College (Head from 1974 to 1979 of Chichester High School For Boys and from 1969 to 1974 of King Edward VI Five Ways)
- Carl Groves (2002–2011)
- Nigel Duncan (2012– ??)
- Andrew Kaye ( ??-

== Academic performance ==
The latest Ofsted report (2017) rated Fareham College as an 'Outstanding' college.

== Alumni ==
=== Price's School ===
- Neil Astley, who founded Bloodaxe Books
- Rear admiral Roger Dimmock, commanded HMS Hermes from 1982 to 1983, and RNAS Culdrose from 1980 to 1982
- Robert Goddard (novelist)
- Peter Long, businessperson
