= John Wood (mathematician) =

Educator, political writer, cartographer

John Wood (c. 1775–1822) was a professor of mathematics at the College of William & Mary, political writer, and cartographer, who tutored the grandchildren of Thomas Jefferson.

== Life ==
A native of Scotland, Wood spent much of his early years in France and Switzerland before immigrating to New York City in 1800. Upon arriving in the United States, he soon met Aaron Burr and wrote a number of pamphlets supporting Burr's political stance. One of Wood’s efforts, The History of the Administration of John Adams was deemed so controversial that Burr unsuccessfully attempted to suppress it. Wood briefly lived in Kentucky in 1806 and resided thereafter in Richmond, Virginia. He received his education from the College of William & Mary, where he graduated in 1807. A close acquaintance of Thomas Jefferson, Wood taught his grandson, Thomas Jefferson Randolph, at the Louis H. Girardin Academy from 1809 to 1810. He continued to pursue his own mathematical and scientific interests, and subsequently obtained a professorial appointment at the College of William & Mary in 1812. In 1817 he tutored another of Thomas Jefferson's grandsons, Francis Eppes, and began to map the rivers of the Tidewater region. Wood unsuccessfully sought a professorship position at the newly established University of Virginia, but received a contract with the Commonwealth of Virginia in 1819 to produce maps of all the counties and a general state map, completing ninety-six of the county maps before his death in 1822.

During his time as a cartographer, Wood obtained a vocabulary of the Nottoway language from Edith Turner, styled as the "queen" of the Nottoway (Cheroenhaka) people and the last known speaker of the language, on March 4, 1820. Wood subsequently sent a copy of the vocabulary to Thomas Jefferson, who forwarded the lexicon to Peter S. Du Ponceau. Wood initially, and incorrectly, assumed a relationship between Nottoway and Powhatan, after which Du Ponceau correctly identified Nottoway as an Iroquoian language. The vocabulary collected by Wood accounts for the majority of lexical data we currently have of Nottoway.
