= Peter Long =

- Born: Peter Long; 4 June 1952 (age 74); Malta
- Education: Price's Grammar School
- Occupations: Chairman, Royal Mail; Chairman, Countrywide
- Spouse: Married
- Children: 3 sons

Peter Long (born 4 June 1952) is an English businessman. He is the chairman of Countrywide.

== Early years ==
Long was born in Malta, as his father was serving in the Royal Navy. He attended Price's Grammar School in Fareham, Hampshire, following which he went to further education college to qualify as an accountant.

== Career ==
Long began his career as a cost accountant at electronics firm Vernitron. He then worked in finance at engineering firm Thomas Tilling before moving into the travel industry. He joined Harry Goodman's International Leisure Group in 1984, rising to chief executive of the tourism division. Following this, he set up Sunworld in 1991 with Spanish hotelier partners, and it was eventually sold to the Thomas Cook Group in June 1996.

In November 1996, Long was appointed group managing director of First Choice Holidays PLC and became chief executive in September 1999.

He was one of the architects of the 2007 consolidation in European tour operating in which First Choice Holidays merged with TUI Tourism (part of TUI AG) in September 2007 to create TUI Travel PLC, one of the largest leisure travel groups in the world. Post-merger, Long grew TUI Travel's profits in sometimes challenging market conditions by offering more differentiated holiday products - hotels and activities that not available through other operators - to its customers.

TUI Travel merged with TUI AG in December 2014 to form TUI Group, the world's largest tourism company. Long was joint chief executive of TUI Group, and is deputy chairman of the supervisory board.

In October 2013, Long was appointed president of the Family Holiday Association, a UK-based charity which provides short breaks away from home for more than 2,000 disadvantaged families. Long became chairman of Royal Mail in September 2015.

In January 2018, Long who is chairman of Countrywide, replaced Alison Platt the CEO, who resigned after the company issued its second profit warning in three months, and its shares fell to an all-time low, while a successor is sought.

== Honours and awards ==
- Medal of the Order of Isabella the Catholic for contributions to services to Spanish tourism (2009).
- Member of the British Travel Industry Hall of Fame (inducted in 2001).
- Odyssey Award from the Institute of Travel and Tourism (received twice, 1998 and 2008).

== Personal life ==
Long is married, with three sons.
