= Humberts =

British estate agency chain

- Company type: Private
- Industry: Estate agency
- Founded: 1842; 184 years ago in London, UK
- Founder: Edward Humbert
- Headquarters: Norwich, UK
- Website: humberts.com

Humberts is a British estate agency chain. First established in 1842 by Edward Humbert.

== History ==
=== The early years ===
Humberts was founded by Edward Humbert, who opened his first office in London. At that time, the company was primarily focused on helping clients buy and sell property in the UK. By 1885 the firm became known as Humbert, Son & Flint, later becoming just Humbert & Flint in 1898.

=== 1900s ===
Over the years, Humberts expanded its operations and began offering a wider range of services to clients. In the early 1900s, the company started to offer property management services, and by the 1920s, it had become one of the leading real estate agencies in the UK. During World War II, Humberts' operations were severely impacted by the conflict, but the company managed to survive and rebuild after the war, and also survived The Great Depression.

In May 1972, Humbert & Flint merged with the west country firm of Rawlence & Squarey, founded 1852, just ten years after the Humbert business. The new firm was known as Humbert, Flint, Rawlence & Sqaurey, although this name lasted only five years before the company rationalised the name to simply be Humberts.

In the following decades, Humberts continued to grow and expand its services, with a particular focus on the luxury property market. Highlights include selling Land's End in 1981 and the Highgrove Estate to the Prince of Wales in 1980, managing the Goodwood and Badminton Estates, and pioneering the development of new London towns such as Letchworth & Welwyn Garden City and Hatfield New Town.

=== 2000s ===
In the 2000s however, the company underwent a period of expansion, opening new offices across the UK and branching out into international markets which lead to over two decades of uncertainty.

In 2006, Humberts were brought out by Farley Group, owners of the former Kensington and Chelsea estate agents Farley & Co. However, the group was sold to Mercantile (partly owned by Vincent Tchenguiz) in 2008 after a troubled couple of years of trading. In December 2008, Mercantile purchased Vincent Tchenquiz's stake in Chestertons, giving them full ownership of Chestertons.

==== Chestertons ownership ====
Chestertons merged with Humberts in 2009 (bringing together two of the longest established firms in the industry), with the business being rebranded. rebranded as Chesterton Humberts. The combined firmed also firm acquired a former franchised operation of two branches in the South East of England, strengthening their representation in this geographic area.

In early 2013, Various UK estate agents including Humberts launched a new property called Agents Mutual. Selected founders included Douglas & Gordon, Glentree Estates, Knight Frank, Savills, and Strutt & Parker.

In 2013, a decision was made by the board to split Chesterton Humberts into two separate brands, with Chestertons retaining the Farleys business and keeping the London operations whilst Humberts focussed on the rest of the country. Whilst the company went through various different holding companies - it remained owned by Mercantile until 2018.

=== Attempted comeback (2014–2017) ===
On 2 July 2014, Hamptons acquired Humberts country lettings & property management business. The same month, on 19 July, the company subsequently launched a rebrand at the CLA Game Fair at Blenheim Palace.

In March 2016, Humberts launched an internal training academy in order to nurture staff in-house. In March of that year, a personal assistant’ service was launched by the company for older buyers in a bid to woo retirement new-build clients. In November that year, Humberts announced a new branch in the Lake District, as part of an franchise-led expansion.

Humberts started 2017 by launching a new Waterfront & Coastal specialist division. Based out of the Chichester office in West Sussex, the launch follows a strong 2016 for the firm, which reported trading figures were up by 18% compared to the previous 12 months, and an even bigger spike in demand from waterfront homes. In March, they restarted their lettings division, following the 2014 sale, and in April, they opened a brand new office in London at 48 Berkeley Square. After appointing a new chairman, Peter Goldsmith, Humberts launched in August 2017 a two-tiered online service for landlords, with a view to rolling it out for sales should it have been successful. 2018 started with continuation of Humberts expansion plans as they announced in January a push to expand their network via a restructured franchising team. Then in February, they started the roll out of regional New Homes hubs, to service a wide set of areas, with a view to rolling them out across various UK locations over the subsequent two years.

However, in April that year, Humberts called in administrators citing "turbulent market conditions and pressures on the industry as whole". Almost exactly a decade after the firm last went into administration; resulting in the sale of Humberts’ to Chestertons-owner Mercantile Group which lead to the creation of Chestertons Humberts, the firm announced redundancies are being made as part of "immediate cost saving measures".

A month later, on 21 May, it was announced that Humberts was acquired by luxury holiday homes business "Natural Retreats", a business founded by Matt Spence in 2006, after the former rugby player and Coca-Cola exec developed his family's farm in the Yorkshire Dales into a holiday let location, with timber lodges. Spence was quoted at the time saying that the acquisition of Humberts was "part of a plan “to create a leading rural estate agency and holiday lettings business". Humberts CEO Ian Westerling was moved to become 'Head of New Projects', whilst the Natural Retreats management team, took over the senior management positions at Humberts, promising to focus on Britain's ‘chocolate box towns’ as part of a 'new era' for the company.

The new management team started implementing changes immediately. Traditional high-street branches were ditched in favour of "lounge-style hubs", each covering an entire county and managing clients’ homes and lifestyles. The first hub was announced for Poundbury, Dorset, with other hubs planned to be rolled out. At the opening in November that year, Humberts launched a new "lifestyle concierge" arm, called Humberts Living. The service offers a gamut of property-related services including gardening, removals, utility-switching and planning.

The attempted revival of Humberts continued into 2019. After the announcement in February of various positive results since Natural Retreats took over, the firm announced in May 2019 it had made its first acquisition since the takeover, with the purchase of Kendal-based Scott Bainbridge has been bought for an undisclosed sum, boosting Humberts’ portfolio in the Lake District "by 25%". They also promoted the former COO Tim Simmomns - a veteran of the company for over 20 years, to CEO.

However rumours began to swirl at the beginning of December, that Humberts was going back into administration, after the company website went down. It was later confirm on 20 December 2019, that Humberts had gone back into administration, for the third time in 11 years.

=== Franchisee takeover (2020) ===
On 24 January 2020, It was announced Humberts was going to be purchased by a group of Humberts Franchise owners. Administrators had claimed that there was national and international interest, however this was the best possible solution for the brand.

== Present day ==
The current iteration of Humberts survived the pandemic, and towards the end of 2020, was announced as an early adopting member of the new property portal, Boomin, created by Purplebricks founders Michael & Kenny Bruce. It has since focused on expanding its franchise network. Recent opening's have included a second franchisee in East Sussex, and in January 2023, Humberts announced its tenth franchise, focussing on the Oxfordshire region.
