= John Woods =

John Woods may refer to:

== Education ==
- John Woods (logician) (1937–2024), Canadian professor of logic
- John Woods (oceanographer) (born 1939), British professor of oceanography
- John E. Woods (historian) (active since 1970), American professor of Iranian and Central Asian history
- John E. Woods (translator) (1942–2023), translator of literature from German to English

== Entertainment ==
- John Joseph Woods (1849–1934), composer of music for national anthem of New Zealand
- Johnny Silvo (John Woods, 1936–2011), British folk and blues singer
- John Levene (born John Woods in 1941), British actor
- John Woods, a Scottish showman who exhibited the Tay Whale around Britain in the 1880s

== Politics ==
- John Woods (Pennsylvania politician) (1761–1816), U.S. Representative from Pennsylvania
- John Woods (Ohio politician) (1794–1855), U.S. Representative from Ohio
- John M. Woods (1839–1927), American politician in Massachusetts
- John Woods (Australian politician) (1822–1892), Minister of Railways in colonial Victoria
- John Woods (Canadian politician) (1876–1957), in the Legislative Assembly of New Brunswick
- John Woods (civil servant) (1895–1962), British civil servant

== Sports ==
- John Thomas Archer Woods (c. 1872–1954), English cricketer and footballer
- John Woods (baseball) (1898–1946), MLB player for the Boston Red Sox
- John Woods (runner) (born 1955), Irish long-distance runner
- John Woods (footballer) (active 1954–1967), Scottish footballer
- John Woods (rugby league) (born 1956), English footballer 1970s–1990s, coached in the 1980s
- Jack Woods (rugby league) (1907–1965), English footballer in the 1930s

== Other ==
- John Crawford Woods (1824–1906), Australian minister
- John Grieve Woods (1900–1980), Australian doctor and soldier
- John C. Woods (1911–1950), American executioner at the Nuremberg Trials

== See also ==
- Jon Woods (born 1977), U.S. politician from Arkansas
- John Wood (disambiguation)
