= Nottoway language =

Extinct Native American language of Virginia

Nottoway
- Native to: United States
- Region: Virginia
- Ethnicity: Nottoway, Meherrin
- Extinct: 1838, with the death of Edith Turner
- Revival
- Language family: Iroquoian: Northern; Tuscarora–Nottoway; Nottoway

Language codes
- ISO 639-3: Either: ntw – Nottoway nwy – Nottoway-Meherrin=
- Glottolog: nott1246 Nottoway mehe1242 Meherrin
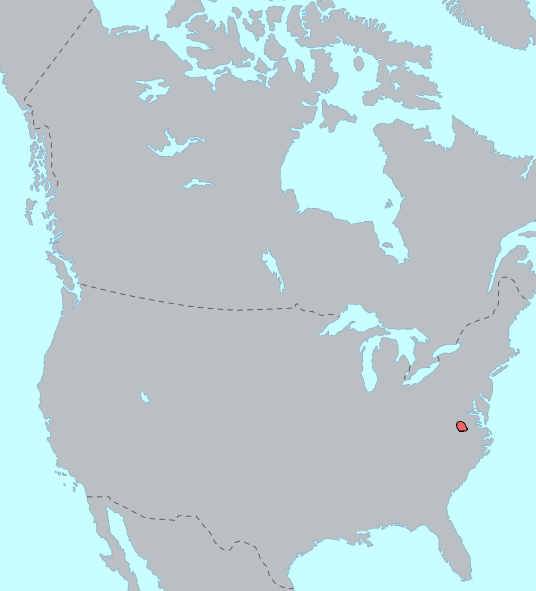
- Pre-contact distribution of the Nottoway language

Nottoway /ˈnɒtəˌweɪ/, also called Cheroenhaka and Nottoway-Meherrin, is an extinct language historically spoken by the Meherrin and Nottoway peoples. Nottoway is closely related to Tuscarora within the Iroquoian language family. Two tribes of Nottoway are recognized by the state of Virginia: the Nottoway Indian Tribe of Virginia and the Cheroenhaka (Nottoway) Indian Tribe. Other Nottoway descendants live in Wisconsin and Canada, where some of their ancestors fled in the 18th century. The last known speaker, Edith Turner, died in 1838. The Nottoway people are undertaking work for language revival.

Knowledge of Nottoway comes primarily from a word list collected on March 4, 1820. Former President Thomas Jefferson’s handwritten letter to Peter S. Du Ponceau, on July 7, 1820, states that a Nottoway Indian vocabulary was obtained on March 4th, 1820 from Edith Turner, styled as their “Queen,” by John Wood, a former Professor of Mathematics at the College of William and Mary. Du Ponceau recognized the language immediately as Iroquoian, writing that he was "struck as well as astonished at its decided Iroquois Physiognomy." Blair A. Rudes (1981) concluded that Nottoway is a distinct language from Tuscarora, but closest to Tuscarora within Iroquoian.

In addition to the vocabulary collected by John Wood, a few additional words were gathered by James Trezvant.

== Phonology ==
=== Vowels ===
By comparing words in Wood’s vocabulary with cognates in other Iroquoian languages, Blair Rudes (1981) was able to reconstruct the phonemes of Nottoway. According to Rudes, Nottoway has five vowel phonemes as seen in the following table. These symbols, which Rudes uses in his transcriptions, are consistent with the International Phonetic Alphabet (IPA). Note that the mid central vowel is nasalized.

	Front	Central	Back
High	i		
Mid	e	ə̃	o
Low		a	

Examples of these vowels are shown in the following table (from the Wood vocabulary). Wood's spelling of Nottoway was based on English and was therefore not systematic. A comparison to Tuscarora cognates in the rightmost column, however, provides evidence of Wood's intended vowel sound.

/i/	tar**i**ha	‘hot’	cf. Tuscarora yuʔnarihə̃
/i/	wh**i**sk	‘five’	cf. Tuscarora wísk
/i/	ah**ee**ta	‘sun’	cf. Tuscarora híhtæʔ
/i/	k**ee**nu	‘swamp’	cf. Tuscarora kí:nə̃ʔ
/e/	ow**e**na	‘iron’	cf. Tuscarora uwǽ:nə̃h
/e/	ot**e**r	‘sand’	cf. Tuscarora uʔtǽhæh
/e/	d**e**kanee	‘two’	cf. Tuscarora nǽ:kti:
/a/	oy**a**g	‘six’	cf. Tuscarora úhyaʔk
/a/	g**a**tkum	‘blood’	cf. Tuscarora kátkə̃ʔ
/o/	**o**wena	‘iron’	cf. Tuscarora uwǽ:nə̃h
/o/	**o**wees	‘ice’	cf. Tuscarora uwí:sæh
/o/	ak**u**hor	‘old man’	cf. Tuscarora rúhuhr, akúhuhr ‘one’s old man’
/ə̃/	hahen**ū**	‘thunder’	cf. Tuscarora haʔ híʔnə̃ʔ
/ə̃/	deesh**ū**	‘stars’	cf. Wyandot tíšɔ̃h
/ə̃/	dekr**a**	‘eight’	cf. Tuscarora nǽ:krə̃ʔ
/ə̃/	auw**a**	'water’	cf. Tuscarora á:wə̃ʔ

=== Consonants ===
Nottoway has ten consonant phonemes, listed in the table below. Like the vowels, these consonant phonemes were reconstructed by Rudes using John Wood's vocabulary and knowledge of related languages. Most of the symbols that Rudes uses are the same as the IPA symbols. Where they differ, the IPA symbol is included in square brackets. The three labial consonants are in parentheses because these phonemes are only present in five words of the language, none of which are of Iroquoian descent. The letter ‘m’ also sometimes occurs at the end of a word after a vowel, but this is to indicate nasalization of the previous vowel, not the presence of the phoneme /m/.

	Labial	Dental	Palatal	Velar	Glottal
Plosive	(p)	t		k	ʔ
Nasal	(m)	n			
Affricate			t͡ʃ ⟨č⟩		
Fricative	(f)	s			h
Approximant		r	j ⟨y⟩	w	

The following table shows example words with each of these consonants (also from the Wood vocabulary). Comparison to related languages (primarily Tuscarora) allowed Rudes to reconstruct some of the consonant phonemes (in bold).

/t/	ahee**t**a	'sun'	cf. Tuscarora híhtæʔ
/t/	o**t**kum	'devil'	cf. Tuscarora úʔtkə̃h
/t/	o**t**er	'sand'	cf. Tuscarora uʔtǽhæh
/t/	o**t**eusag	'nose'	cf. Tuscarora uʔtyə̃́hsæh
/t/	**d**ekra	'eight'	cf. Tuscarora nǽ:krə̃ʔ
/t/	**d**eeshū	'stars'	cf. Wyandot tíšɔ̃h
/t/	**d**ekanee	'two'	cf. Mohawk tékeni
/k/	**k**eenu	'swamp'	cf. Tuscarora ki:nə̃ʔ
/k/	**k**aintu	'fish'	cf. Tuscarora kə̃́:čə̃h
/k/	e**k**unsquare	'cheeks'	cf. Tuscarora ukə̃́skaræh
/k/	un**k**oharae	'eyes'	cf. Tuscarora ukáhræh
/k/	wa**q**uast	'good'	cf. Tuscarora wákwahst
/k/	a**q**uia	'deer'	cf. Tuscarora á:kwæh
/k/	**g**atkum	'blood'	cf. Tuscarora kátkə̃ʔ
/k/	oya**g**	'six'	cf. Tuscarora úhyaʔk
/ʔ/	onusha**g**	'house'	cf. Mohawk kanṹ
/č/	**ch**eer	'dog'	cf. Tuscarora číhr
/č/	**g**eekquam	'gold'	cf. Tuscarora učitkwáhnæh
/č/	un**tch**ore	'to eat'	cf. Tuscarora ə̃čú:riʔ ‘it ate’
/č/	yauta**tch**	'air'	cf. Tuscarora úʔna:č ‘wind’
/č/	un**t**e	'one'	cf. Tuscarora ə̃́:či
/č/	kain**t**u	'fish'	cf. Tuscarora kə̃́:čə̃h
/s/	whi**s**k	'five'	cf. Tuscarora wísk
/h/	o**h**onag	'skin'	cf. Mohawk óhnaʔ
/n/	hahe**n**ū	'thunder'	cf. Tuscarora haʔ híʔnə̃ʔ
/r/	chee**r**	'dog'	cf. Tuscarora číhr
/r/	que**r**ū	'rabbit'	cf. Tuscarora kwǽ:ruh
/r/	o**r**wisag	‘tail’	cf. Tuscarora uʔrhwə̃́:θæh
/r/	dek**r**a	'eight'	cf. Tuscarora nǽ:krə̃ʔ
/r/	quaha**rr**ag	'apple'	cf. Tuscarora kwáhrak
/r/	waska**rr**ow	'hog'	cf. Tuscarora waθkwá:ræh
/w/	o**w**ees	'ice'	cf. Tuscarora uwí:sæh
/w/	au**w**a	'water'	cf. Tuscarora á:wə̃ʔ
/w/	o**w**ena	'iron'	cf. Tuscarora uwǽ:nə̃h
/w/	or**wi**sag	'tail'	cf Tuscarora uʔrhwə̃́:θæh
/w/	waq**u**ast	'good'	cf. Tuscarora wákwahst
/w/	aq**u**ia	'deer'	cf. Tuscarora á:kwæh
/w/	kosq**u**enna	'mouse'	cf. Tuscarora ruskwǽ:nə̃h
/w/	q**u**erū	'rabbit'	cf. Tuscarora kwǽ:ruh
/y/	o**y**entu	'rat'	cf. Tuscarora ruyə̃́ʔtuh
/y/	got**y**akum	'husband'	cf. Tuscarora katyá:kə̃h
/y/	ot**e**usag	'nose'	cf. Tuscarora uʔtyə̃́hsæh

=== Syllable structure ===
The English-based spelling Wood used makes it difficult to determine syllable structure. Most words, however, are consistent with the syllable structure (C)V(C)(C):

Syllable shape	Wood's Nottoway spelling	
V	**o**tosag	'tooth'
CV	**ga**kuhar	'to wash'
CVC	orwi**sag**	'tail'
CVCC	wak**wast**	'good'
VC	**or**wisag	'tail'

An exception is words that begin with /kw/ (which may have been a complex segment):

A Rabbit	**Qu**erū	cf. Tuscarora kwǽ:ruh

There is also limited evidence that words could end in three consonants:

A Squirrel	osa**rst**

Consonant clusters must include /w/ or /s/, and possibly /n/. /w/ is the most common, but /s/ is still regularly seen in words like Whisk 'five'. The status of /n/ is uncertain since Wood used ⟨n⟩ to represent nasal vowels.

Aside from Whisk 'five', most content words are multisyllabic.

== Grammar ==
=== Possessive prefixes ===
Rudes (1981) notes that Nottoway has two series of pronominal prefixes used for inalienable and alienable possession. Inalienable nouns, such as body parts, are possessed with the prefix ge- 'my': ge-snunke 'my hand', ge-tunke 'my belly'. Alienable nouns are possessed with the prefix ak- 'my': ak-uhor '(my) old man', aqu-eianha '(my) boy'. These two series of pronominal prefixes are also used on verbs, where they indicate the agent and patient, respectively. The full set of prefixes is listed in the table below.

Possessive prefixes
First singular inalienable possessive (my; I)
ge-	ge-snunke	‘my hand’ (recorded as ‘your hand’)
ge-	ge-tunke	'my belly' (recorded as 'your belly')
Second singular inalienable possessive (your; you)
se-/s-	se-tunke	‘your belly’ (recorded as ‘my belly’)
se-/s-	se-tarakē	‘the head (your head)’
Feminine/zoic inalienable possessive (her/one's; she)
ye-/e-	ye-tunke	'(one's) nails'
ye-/e-	e-skaharant	'(one's) mouth'
First-person singular alienable possessive (my; I/me)
ak-/aqu-	ak-uhor	‘(my) old man’
ak-/aqu-	aqu-eianha	‘(my) boy’
Second-person singular alienable possessive (your; you)
sa-	sa-ttaak	'(your) bed'
sa-	sa-tuntatag	'(you) listen'
Feminine/zoic kinship possessive (her/one's; she/it/one)’
go-	go-tyāg	‘(one’s) marriage’
go-	go-tyakum	‘(her) husband’

=== Other affixes ===
In addition to the possessive prefixes, Rudes identifies a number of other affixes appearing in the Wood vocabulary. They are as follows:

Partitive (indicates part of a whole; also used to form multiples of ten)
ne(e)-	newisha	‘short’
ne(e)-	arsaneewarsa	'thirty'
Dualic
de-, to-, te-	towatgeheterise	‘lightning’
de-, to-, te-	dewartha	‘twenty’
Aorist
wa-, un-	untchore	'to eat'
wa-, un-	wasweke	'to speak'
Semireflexive
at-, t-, ate-	satuntatag	'(you) listen'
at-, t-, ate-	untoreesweg	'(it) drown(ed)'
Reflexive (action done to oneself)
tat-	untatren	‘(it) cut’
tat-	untatreeyou	‘(it) kill(ed)’
Simple Noun
-ag	ototorag	'door'
-ag	onushag	'house'
Internal locative (“in,” “under”)
-coon	oraracoon	‘the woods’
External locative (usually means “on,” or “at,” but loses its locative meaning when attached to a body part)
-ke	setunke	‘your belly’
-ke	skeshunke	‘your flesh’
Characterizer (person who is part of a group)
-hoka, -hakaʔ	tcherohakaʔ	‘Cheroenhaka people’
“Teen” (as in “thirteen,” “fourteen,” etc.)
-ahr	arsaskahr	‘thirteen’
-ahr	dekraskahr	‘eighteen’

=== Word order ===
Most of the written Nottoway materials are vocabularies rather than texts, so scholars can only make limited assumptions about the syntactic structure of the language. However, Rudes (1981) explains three syntactic characteristics that are supported by recorded Nottoway evidence:

1. The definite article precedes a noun, as in Tuscarora.

Hahenũ
'the thunder' (cf. Tuscarora haʔ híʔnə̃ʔ)

2. Of two adjacent nouns, the first noun modifies the second.

Acquia ohonag
deer skin
'deer skin'

3. An adjective follows the noun it modifies, and most likely could also precede it.

Unksawa wokenhu
{} year
'the new year'

Rudes tentatively reconstructs noun incorporation based on these examples:

Nottoway yuhtaquaahkum 'shoemaker' (lit. 'one makes shoes')
yu- 'neuter patient prefix'
-htaqua- 'shoe' (cf. Tuscarora uhnáhkwaʔ, Seneca ahtáhkwaʔ)
-ahkum 'to assemble' (cf. Tuscarora -ahk 'to pick up')

Nottoway satuntatag 'to listen' (lit. 'you stand up your ears')
s- 'second singular agent prefix'
-at- 'reciprocal'
-unta- 'ear' (cf. Tuscarora uhə̃́hnæh, Onondaga ohə̃́htaʔ)
-tag 'to stand + '(?) descriptive aspect' (cf. Onondaga iktaʔ 'I'm standing,' Seneca iːkeːt)

== Vocabulary ==
The following vocabulary is from Wood as cited in Rudes from the version Jefferson sent to Du Ponceau.

=== Nouns of the Universe ===
Wood's English	Wood's Nottoway spelling	Cognates
The Sun	Aheeta	cf. Tuscarora híhtæʔ
The Moon	Tethrāke	
The Stars	Deeshū	cf. Wyandot tíšɔ̃h
The Clouds	Uraseque	
Thunder	Hahenū	cf. Tuscarora haʔ híʔnə̃ʔ
Lightning	Towatgeheterise	cf. Tuscarora næwatkarǽʔnari:ks
Air	Yautatch	
God	Quakerhuntè	
Devil	Otkum	cf. Tuscarora útkə̃h
Rain	Yountoutch	cf. Tuscarora wə̃́:tu:č
Snow	Kankaus	
Ice	Owees	cf. Tuscarora uwí:sæh
Fire	Auteur	
Water	Auwa	cf. Tuscarora á:wə̃ʔ
a river	Joke	
a great river	Onoschioke	
The Ocean	Owan Fetchota	cf. Tuscarora á:wə̃ʔ ‘water’
a mountain	Yenuntenunte	cf. Tuscarora unə̃́ʔnæh
The Woods	Oraracoon	
Rocks	Oruntag	
Light	Youhanhū	
Darkness	Asuntā	cf. Tuscarora uhθə̃́:ʔnæh
a Swamp	Keenu	cf. Tuscarora kí:nə̃ʔ
Sand	Oter	cf. Tuscarora uʔtǽhæh
Gold or Copper	Geekquan	
Silver	Wanee	
Iron	Owena	cf. Tuscarora uwǽ:nə̃h
Heaven	Quakeruntika	

=== Of the Human Species ===
Wood's English	Wood's Nottoway Spelling	Cognates
Man	Enihā	cf. Tuscarora raʔníhə̃h ‘he’s male’
An old man	Akuhor	cf. Tuscarora rúhuhr, akúhuhr ‘one’s old man’
A young man	Aquatio	
A boy	Aqueianha	
A woman	Ekening	
An old woman	Aquasuari	
A young woman	Chewasrisha	
Death	Anseehe	
A dead body	Wahehun	
The head	Setarakē	
Marriage	Gotyāg	
A husband	Gotyakum	cf. Tuscarora katyá:kə̃h
A wife	Dekes	
A son	Wakatonta	
A daughter	Eruhā	
A King	Tirer	
The belly	Unkē	
My belly	Setunke	cf. Tuscarora sætkwə̃́ʔkyæ ‘your stomach’
Your belly	Getunke	
The hand or fingers	Nunke	
My hand	Sesnunke	cf. Mohawk sesnṹhsaʔke ‘your hand’
Your hand	Gesnunke	cf. Mohawk kesnṹhsaʔke ‘my hand’
The right hand	Panunkee	
The left hand	Matapanunkee	
The thigh	Otitchag	
The knee	Sunsheke	
The leg	Franseke	
The foot	Saseeke	
The hair	Howerac	
The eyes	Unkoharae	cf. Tuscarora ukáhræh
The mouth	Eskaharant	
The ears	Suntunke	cf. Tuscarora shə̃hnə̃́ʔkyæ ‘your ears’
The tongue	Darsunke	
The teeth	Otosag	cf. Tuscarora utú:ʔθæh
The neck	Steereke	
The nose	Oteusag	cf. Tuscarora uʔtyə̃́hsæh
The lips	Oarāg	
The chin	Ochag	
The toes	Seeke	
Blood	Gatkum	cf. Tuscarora kátkə̃ʔ
Skin	Ohonag	cf. Mohawk óhnaʔ
Flesh	Skeshunke	
Nails	Yetunke	
Heart	Sunke	
The cheeks	Ekunsquare	cf. Tuscarora ukə̃́skaræh
The breath	Untures	
The Eye brows	Eskarunke	
A shoemaker	Yuntaquaankum (Yuhtaquaahkum)	

=== Of Animals ===
Wood's English	Wood's Nottoway spelling	Cognates
A Cow	Tosherung	
A dog	Cheer	cf. Tuscarora číhr
A hog	Waskarrow	cf. Tuscarora waθkwá:ræh
A boar	Garhusung	
A deer	Aquia	cf. Tuscarora á:kwæh
A mouse	Kosquenna	cf. Tuscarora ruskwǽ:nə̃h
A rat	Oyentu	cf. Tuscarora ruyə̃́ʔtuh
A bull frog	Drakon	
Fish	Kaintu	cf. Tuscarora kə̃́:čə̃h
A Shad or Herring	Kohan	
An Eel	Kunte	
A crab	Sosune	
A snake	Antatum	
A bird	Cheeta	cf. Tuscarora číʔnə̃ʔ
A turkey	Kunum	
A Hen	Tawrettig	cf. Tuscarora tahurǽ:tik
A Fox	Skeyu	
A Wolf	Huse	
A Squirrel	Osarst	
A Rabbit	Querū	cf. Tuscarora kwǽ:ruh
A house fly	Deēsrere	
A Bee	Ronuquam	
A Shell	Odersag	
A Deer Skin	Aquia ohonag	cf. Tuscarora á:kwæh; cf. Mohawk óhnaʔ
A Wing	Ohuwistāg	cf. Tuscarora uyə̃hwí:θnæh
A Feather	Awenkrāg	
Wool	Ostoharag	
The tail	Orwisag	cf. Tuscarora uʔrhwə̃́:θæh
Horns	Osherag	

=== Division of Time ===
Wood's English	Wood's Nottoway spelling	Cognates
A year	Wokenhu	
The new year	Unksawa-Wokenhu	
The new moon	Dotratung	
Spring	Shantaroswache	
Summer	Genheke	
Autumn	Basheke	
Winter	Goshera	
Morning	Suntetung	
Day-time	Antyeke	
Mid-day	Anteneekal	
Evening	Gensake	
Night-time	Asunta	

=== Domestic Articles ===
Wood's English	Wood's Nottoway Spelling	Cognates
A House	Onushag	cf. Tuscarora unə̃́hsæh
The house of some individual	Weynushag	
A door	Ototorag	
A chimney	Odeshag	
A Knife	Osakenta	
A Stick	Ocherura	
A Gun	Ata	
A Bed	Sattaak	
Milk	Canu	
Spirits	Anuqua	cf. Tuscarora uhnǽ:kyæh 'liquor, spirits'
Clothes	Aquast	
Smoke	Okyer	
Shoes	Otagwāg	cf. Tuscarora uhnáhkwaʔ
Stockings	Orisrāg	
Leather	Totierhiā	
Linen	Nikanrārā	
Fat meat	Oskaharag	
Lean meat	Oharag	
A Fiddle	Eruskarintita	
A Bottle	Chewak	cf. Tuscarora učhǽʔwæh
Paper	Orirag	

=== Adjectives ===
Wood's English	Wood's Nottoway Spelling	Cognates
White	Owheryakum	
Black	Gehuntee	cf. Tuscarora kahə̃́sči:
Red	Ganuntquare	
Green	Sekatequantin	
Weak	Genuheha	
Dry	Yourha	cf. Onondaga óhɛ̃h
Wet	Yaorā	
Ugly	Yesaxa	
Beautiful	Yesquast	
Good	Waquast	cf. Tuscarora wákwahst
Bad	Wassa	
Hot	Tariha	cf. Tuscarora yuʔnaríhə̃:
Cold	Watorae	cf. Tuscarora á’thuʔ
Angry	Thatcharore	cf. Tuscarora θačaʔrú:rih ‘you’re angry’
Happy	Thatchanunte	
Unhappy	Dodoitchewakeraksa	
Old	Onahahe	
Young	Osae	
Long	Ewis	
Short	Newisha	cf. Tuscarora tiwæ:θʔáh
Great	Tatchanawihiē	
Little	Newisha	cf. Tuscarora tiwaʔθʔáh
Deep	Tatchanuwiras	
Sharp	Watchoka	
Round	Tatowerente	
Smooth	Chuwatee	
Rough	Genuaquast	
Hard	Wokoste	
Strong	Wakoste	cf. Tuscarora wakáθnæh ‘I’m strong’

=== Numerals ===
Wood's English	Wood's Nottoway Spelling	Cognates
One	Unte	cf. Tuscarora ə̃́:či
Two	Dekanee	cf. Tuscarora nǽ:kti:
Three	Arsa	
Four	Hentag	cf. Tuscarora hə̃́ʔtahk
Five	Whisk	cf. Tuscarora wísk
Six	Oyag	cf. Tuscarora úhyaʔk
Seven	Ohatag (Chatag)	cf. Tuscarora čá:ʔnak
Eight	Dekra	cf. Tuscarora nǽ:krə̃ʔ
Nine	Deheerunk	cf. Tuscarora níhrə̃ʔ
Ten	Washa	
Eleven	Urteskahr (Unteskahr)	
Twelve	Dekaneskahr	
Thirteen	Arsaskahr	
Fourteen	Hentagskahr	
Fifteen	Whiskahr	
Sixteen	Oyagskahr	
Seventeen	Ohatagskahr (Chatagskahr)	
Eighteen	Dekraskahr	
Nineteen	Deheerunkskahr	
Twenty	Dewarthaunteskahr (Dewartha)	cf. Tuscarora næwáhθhə̃h
Thirty	Arseneewarsa	cf. Tuscarora áhsə̃ tiwáhθhə̃h
Forty	Hentagneewarsa	cf. Tuscarora hə̃́ʔtahk tiwáhθhə̃h
Fifty	Wiskaneewarsa	cf. Tuscarora wísk tiwáhθhə̃h
Sixty	Oyagneewarsa	
Seventy	Getaganeewarsa	
Eighty	Dekranee warsa	
Ninety	Deheerunknee warsa	
A hundred	Kahorsthree	
A thousand	Unteyoasthree (yoasthree)	

=== Verbs ===
Wood's English	Wood's Nottoway Spelling	Cognates
To walk	Jā	
To ride	Unksatā	
To fly	Getya	
To swim	Orerunte	
To drink	Ararher	
To eat	Untchore	cf. ə̃čú:riʔ ‘it ate’
To throw	Esungwisatoee	
To cry	Tehesuhard	cf. Tuscarora næká:θnə̃hr ‘I cry’
To sleep	Kertus (Kentus)	cf. Tuscarora kə̃́:tʔuhs ‘it sleeps’
To fight	Wauntrehu	
To wound	Yahterund	
To kill	Urtatreeyou (Untatreeyou)	cf. Tuscarora ə̃ʔnarí:yuʔ 'it killed itself'
To hear	Thrahurta (Thrahunta)	
To see	Waskehee	cf. Tuscarora wáhskə̃ʔ ‘you saw it’
To smell	Saharantoo	
To touch	Swarore	
To speak	Wasweke	cf. Tuscarora wáhswæʔ ‘you spoke’
To hunt	Kunun	
To fish	Watchunund	
To love	Tatchadanuste	
To hate	Dotautche	
To pray	Durtanhara	
To stab	Untequara	
To cut	Untatren	cf. Tuscarora ə̃ʔnáthræʔn ‘it cut itself’
To break	Wayetcherorag	
To drown	Untoreesweg	
To hang	Waharee	cf. Tuscarora waʔká:rə̃ʔ ‘I hung it up’
To strike	Untateuheerug (Untatenheerug)	cf. Tuscarora ə̃ʔnatkə̃́hruk ‘it struck itself’
To shoot	Untatchag	
To listen	Satuntatag	
To wash	Gakuhar	cf. Tuscarora ktú:har ‘I wash’
To run	Sarioka	
To leap	Deunti	

=== Other Words ===
Rudes attributes the following words to a vocabulary by J. N. B. Hewitt. It may be a later version of the one gathered by Trezvant.

English	Nottoway Spelling	Cognates
No	roh (H)	
Yes	hokeh (H)	
Bark	ohseroch (H)	
Corn, maize	ohnehahk (H)	
Infant, child	nahkasehkeh (H)	
Father	akroh (H)	
Mother	ena (H)	
Sow	wakatouta (H)	
Brother	kahtahtekeh (H)	
Sister	ahkahchee (H)	
Arm	ohnunchahk (H)	cf. Tuscarora unə̃́čhæh
Belly	ohtequahk (H)	
Chief	etesheh (H)	
Arrow	aruntquaserauk (H)	
Earth, land	ahonroch (H)	
Lake	kahahtahia (H)	
Mountain	newntehs (H)	cf. Tuscarora unə̃́ʔnæh
I	ee (H)	
Nottoways	Cherohaka (H)	
