= R (National Union of Journalists) v Central Arbitration Committee =

- Court: Court of Appeal of England and Wales
- Citation: EWCA Civ 1309

Keywords
- Trade union, collective bargaining

R (National Union of Journalists) v Central Arbitration Committee [2005] EWCA Civ 1309 is a UK labour law case, concerning collective bargaining.

== Facts ==
The NUJ contended that its application for recognition at the Racing Post newspaper was not inadmissible under the Trade Union and Labour Relations (Consolidation) Act 1992, Schedule A1, paragraph 35. This prescribes that where a collective agreement is ‘already in force’ the procedure cannot take place. The Central Arbitration Committee had decided this was the situation since the Mirror News Group already had a recognition agreement with the British Association of Journalists. The BAJ formed in the early 1990s as a breakaway from the NUJ, but is independent and not affiliated to the Trades Union Congress. It signed an agreement for the Sports Division of the Mirror in 2003, shutting out the NUJ. They only had one member in the Sports Division. A majority of people in the bargaining unit were in favour of statutory recognition of the NUJ. The NUJ argued an agreement should not be considered ‘already in force’ for the purpose of paragraph 35, and in any case the CAC decision breached Article 11 of the European Convention on Human Rights and Article 14.

== Judgment ==
=== High Court ===
Hodge J held there was no need to recognise the NUJ. He said the following.

... a proper reading of para 35 means that a collective bargaining agreement can be brought into force voluntarily between an employer and a union even where the union has no significant support in the bargaining unit. Where that has happened there is nothing in Schedule A1 of the 1992 Act that allows the CAC to require the employer to enter into another recognition agreement with a union that does have majority support.

[...]

Were the BAJ a non-independent trade union, which it is not, its recognition by the Company could be challenged under Part VI of the Schedule.

=== Court of Appeal ===
Buxton LJ held that the smaller collective agreement prevented another one supervening. ‘Already in force’ should take its natural meaning, and it did not matter that collective agreements were not binding. Wilson v UK was considered, but the right to recognition did not fall within the scope of ECHR article 11. Just because one union had an agreement ahead of another did not mean the first suffered discrimination, so art 14 did not apply either.

It is clear to me, as I believe it to have been clear to the constitution of this court that gave permission for this appeal, that the right to be recognised for the purposes of collective bargaining does not fall within the rights guaranteed by Article 11.

Latham LJ and Nourse LJ agreed.

== See also ==
- UK labour law
