= John Wood (footballer, born 1948) =

English footballer (born 1948)

Personal information
- Full name: Johnathan Michael Wood
- Date of birth: 9 September 1948 (age 78)
- Place of birth: Walsall Wood, Staffordshire, England
- Position: Full-back

Youth career
- Wrexham

Senior career*
Years	Team	Apps	(Gls)
1965–1968	Wrexham	7	(0)
- Rhyl
- * Club domestic league appearances and goals

Johnathan Michael Wood (born 9 September 1948) is an English former professional footballer. He made 7 appearances in the football league for Wrexham in the 1960s. He also played for Rhyl.
