= Jonathan Wood (hedge fund manager) =

Jonathan Wood is a British investment manager and former proprietary trader. He is the founder of SRM Global, an investment fund established in 2006. Before founding SRM, Wood spent approximately 17 years at UBS and its predecessor institutions, where he specialised in proprietary trading and investments associated with corporate transactions.

== Early life and career ==
Wood was born in Yorkshire and grew up in Whitstable, Kent, the middle of three children. He studied economics at Loughborough University.

Wood worked for approximately 17 years at UBS and its predecessor institutions, including SBC Warburg. He became head of proprietary trading at UBS and developed a reputation as an investor in takeover situations and other corporate events.

According to The Independent, the strategic risk management team led by Wood generated approximately US$2.4 billion in revenue for UBS and achieved average annual returns of more than 50 per cent during the five years before his departure. UBS subsequently committed US$500 million to Wood's new fund.

While at UBS, Wood was involved in shareholder activism and corporate transactions. The Independent reported that he led a shareholder revolt at Lazard and pressed companies including Fiat and Olivetti over their corporate and share structures.

== SRM Global ==
Wood left UBS in 2006 to establish SRM Global. The fund launched in September 2006 after attracting approximately US$3 billion of commitments, including US$500 million from UBS. SRM pursued a concentrated investment strategy focused on companies involved in mergers, financial restructurings and other corporate events.

Among SRM's most prominent investments were stakes in Northern Rock and the US mortgage lender Countrywide Financial. In January 2008, SRM disclosed a stake of more than five per cent in Countrywide and opposed the terms of its proposed acquisition by Bank of America, arguing that the transaction did not provide sufficient value to shareholders.

=== Northern Rock ===
SRM began acquiring shares in Northern Rock after the bank sought emergency support from the Bank of England in September 2007. By November 2007, SRM had become the bank's largest institutional shareholder and sought a greater role for shareholders in determining the bank's future.

At the time Northern Rock was nationalised in February 2008, SRM held 11.5 per cent of its issued ordinary share capital and was its largest shareholder.

SRM and other former shareholders subsequently challenged the government's method for determining compensation following the nationalisation. The challenge was dismissed by the High Court and the Court of Appeal.

== The Gadget Shop litigation ==
Wood was an investor in The Gadget Shop alongside other shareholders including Peter Wilkinson, Tom Hunter and Chris Gorman.

A dispute arose after Hunter and Gorman acquired the greetings-card retailer Birthdays independently of The Gadget Shop. Wilkinson brought an unfair-prejudice petition alleging that a business opportunity which could have benefited The Gadget Shop had been diverted. Wood, whose shares were held by Wilkinson as trustee, was closely involved in the dispute and gave evidence during the proceedings.

The High Court dismissed the claim in 2005. The proceedings were widely reported as involving a claim worth approximately £100 million, and the judge rejected significant parts of Wood's evidence.

== Support for British sport ==
Wood has provided financial backing to British sporting initiatives. In 2014, he was among the private investors backing Ben Ainslie Racing, the British team established by Sir Ben Ainslie to challenge for the America's Cup. Wood also joined the team's board.

The campaign sought to win the America's Cup for Britain for the first time in the competition's history. Contemporary reporting identified Wood among the private investors who provided the early backing for the British challenge.

== Political activity ==
Wood has made donations to the UK Conservative Party. He donated £500,000 to the party shortly before the 2010 general election, making him one of its largest individual donors during the election period.
