= Central Arbitration Committee =

UK government office

The Central Arbitration Committee is a UK government body, established in 1975, whose task is to resolve disputes regarding UK labour law as it relates to trade union recognition and collective bargaining.

It rules on matters relating to the recognition and derecognition of trade unions in the UK, for purposes of collective bargaining. It also provides voluntary arbitration in industrial and collective disputes, as well as applications and complaints related to information and consultation arrangements.

== Notable cases ==
- R (National Union of Journalists) v Central Arbitration Committee
- IWGB v Central Arbitration Committee (The Deliveroo case)
- Oracle European Works Council v Oracle Corporation UK Ltd
- Netjets Management Ltd v Central Arbitration Committee
- R (Boots Management Services Ltd) v Central Arbitration Committee

== Chairs ==
1976: John Wood
2000: Michael Burton
2017: Stephen Redmond

== See also ==
- UK labour law
- Acas
- National Industrial Relations Court (1971-74)
- Labour Relations Agency (Northern Ireland)
- R (National Union of Journalists) v Central Arbitration Committee
- IWGB v CAC
