= Edith Turner =

Leader of the Nottoway (c. 1754–1838)

Edith Turner (ca. 1754 – February or March 1838), sometimes known as Edy Turner or Edie Turner, or by her personal name Wané Roonseraw, was a leader – often styled "chief" or "queen" – among the Nottoway people of Virginia in the eighteenth and nineteenth centuries.

== Life ==
Turner lived in Southampton County, Virginia, and had been active in land transactions since 1794, although her name first appears on a petition to the Virginia General Assembly dating to 1792, marking her earliest appearance in the historical record. She married one William Green, who appears to have been a non-Indian, in 1819. A tribal census of 1808 listed her employments as "knitting, sewing, and what is usual in common housewifery", and stated that she had two black workers hired for her by white trustees. She is said to have been intelligent, though not highly educated, and a fluent and skilled conversationalist in both English and Nottoway. Little else of her personal life is recorded, and it is not known if she had children, or if she had been married to anyone other than Green. She owned a prosperous farm, and as a leader among her people attempted to convince them to adopt the farming practices used by whites. At the time many refused to participate in intensive farming, and as a result they were forced to sell off reservation land to pay debts; she attempted to divide tracts among individuals instead of treating them collectively. To that end, on October 27, 1821 Turner, acting in her role as chief, petitioned the Virginia General Assembly to parcel out the remaining portion of the reservation among individual residents.

Turner was also active as a foster mother and advocate for Nottoway children, successfully petitioning white trustees to return four to the reservation. She is known to have met Jedidiah Morse in 1820 as he traveled the United States studying Indians at the President's request; he described her as the "reigning Queen" of the tribe and praised her intelligence and business sense. She is also remembered as one of the last three speakers of the Nottoway language, which became extinct sometime before 1900. A wordlist which she provided to surveyor John Wood in 1820 found its way to Thomas Jefferson, who shared it with Peter Stephen Du Ponceau; it is one of the best surviving sources of information about the language. She knew the tribe's legends, and provided an account of one of them to an anonymous writer who submitted it to The Gentleman's Magazine of London, which published it in 1821. She taught children Nottoway traditions, as well as how to exist in a white-dominated society. She was also the only member of the tribe, at the time, to write a will, a brief document which makes no mention of relatives and which leaves the bulk of the estate to one Edwin Turner, whose relationship to her is unknown. At least one later chief of the tribe, Walter David "Red Hawk" Brown III, is descended from one of her foster children.

Turner was named one of the Library of Virginia's Virginia Women in History for 2008.
