= John Wood (photographer) =

Photographer from Washingont D.C.

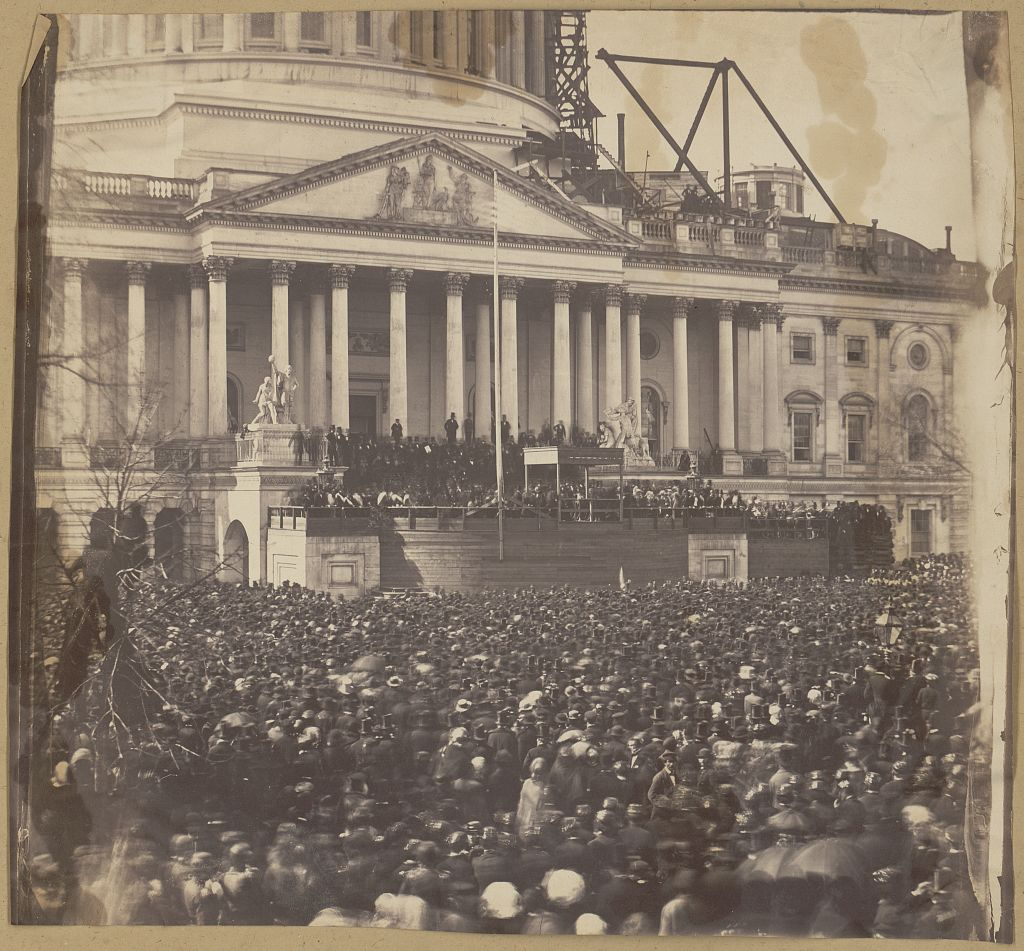
Lincoln's first inauguration, March 4, 1861, taken by John Wood

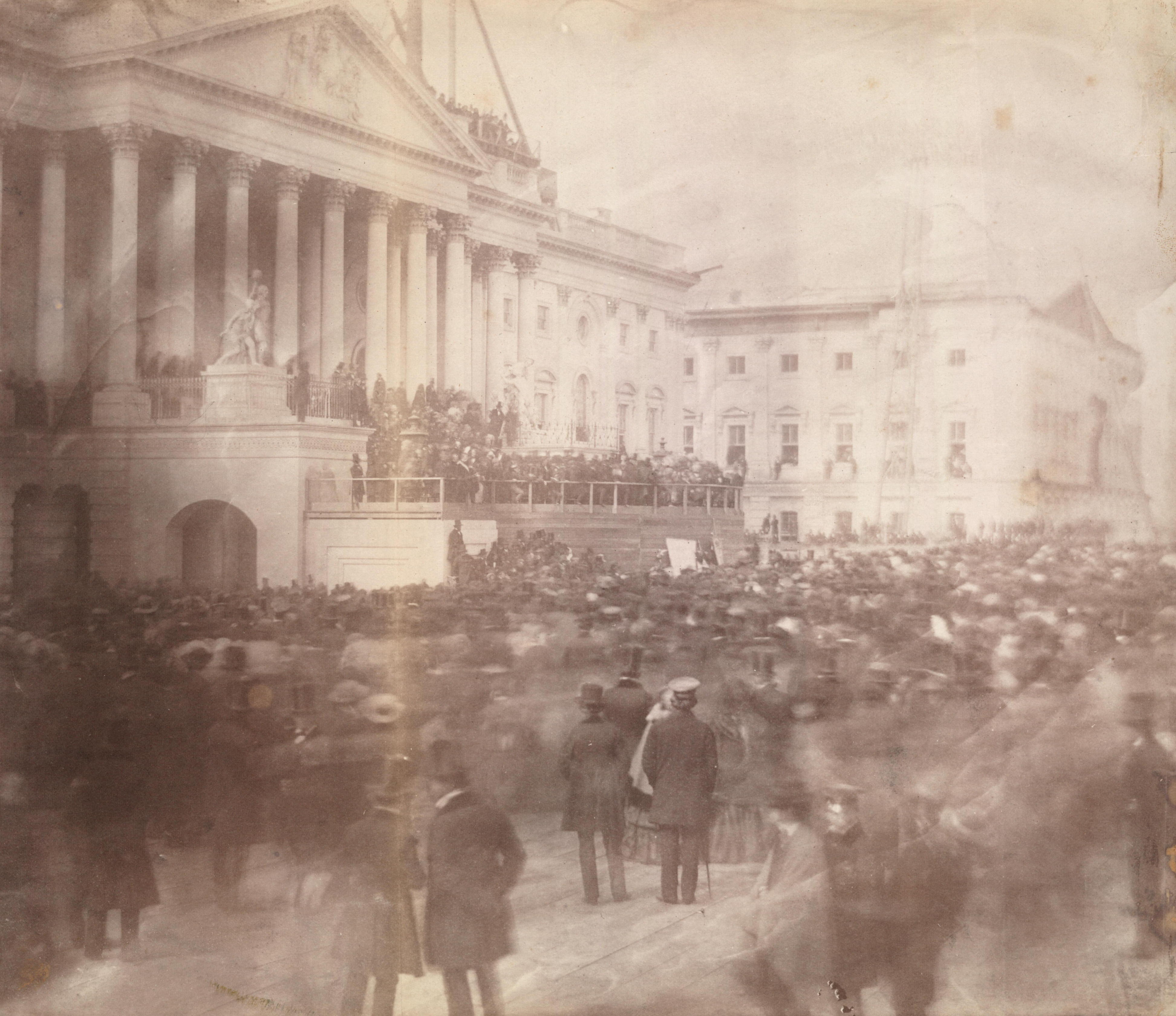
James Buchanan's inauguration, March 4, 1857, taken by John Wood

John Wood (1838–1901) was the U.S. government's first official photographer. He took the photograph of Lincoln's First Inauguration as well as the inauguration of James Buchanan in 1857, thought to be the first known photograph of a Presidential inauguration. Wood made the 1857 exposure in four seconds.

Wood was hired in May 1856 by Montgomery C. Meigs, the Architect of the Capitol, to take photographs of building projects in the Washington D.C. area. Wood was a "photographic draftsman" for the U.S. Capitol expansion project from 1856 to 1861, mostly taking photographs of architectural drawings.

Titian Ramsay Peale, who had been experimenting with photography, introduced Meigs to Wood on May 13, 1856, and Meigs hired Wood the next day.

Wood went on to be an American Civil War photographer, contributing to Alexander Gardner's book Gardner's Photographic Sketch Book of the Civil War along with James F. Gibson. He also photographed maps during the war for General George McClellan.

According to Roy Meredith's Mr. Lincoln’s Cameraman, Matthew Brady himself personally accompanied General George B. McClellan’s Peninsular Campaign into Virginia at the beginning of April 1862, departing Fortress Monroe with Gibson, David B. Woodbury, and John Wood, plus two mobile darkrooms. Photographer George Barnard was also sent along by Gardner, who had been managing Brady's Washington studio.

Wood had a photo gallery at 208 Bowery, in New York City for 40 years, where he photographed many people from the theater and sporting professions.
