= John Wood (New Zealand cricketer) =

New Zealand cricketer (1839–1909)

Personal information
- Born: 1839; England
- Died: 26 January 1909 (aged 69–70); Christchurch, New Zealand
- Source: Cricinfo, 22 October 2020

John Wood (1839 – 26 January 1909) was a New Zealand cricketer. He played in six first-class matches for Canterbury and Wellington from 1868 to 1878.
