= Countrywide =

Estate agent business within the UK

- Type: Ltd
- Industry: Estate agents
- Founded: 1986
- Headquarters: Chelmsford, Essex
- Key people: Paul Creffield, Group Managing Director.
- Revenue: £ 498.1 million (2019)
- Owner: Connells Group
- Number of employees: 8,500+
- Website: countrywide.co.uk

Countrywide is one of the UK's largest integrated property services group including residential property surveying, a collaboration of estate agents, and corporate services. It employs circa 8,500 personnel nationwide, working across 650+ estate agency or lettings offices operating under 50+ brands. Countrywide is a wholly owned subsidiary of Connells Group.

== History ==
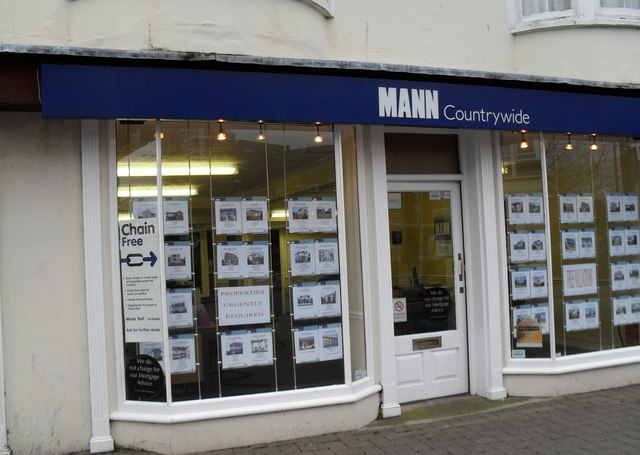
Branch in Bognor Regis, West Sussex

In 1986, financial services company Hambros plc, having de-merged its banking arm, acquired two estate agents, Bairstow Eves and Mann & Co, to form a new company called Hambro Countrywide plc, which was listed on the London Stock Exchange. In 1988, the company created Hambro Assured, then the UK's largest life insurance broker. The group then grew through acquisition, buying Nationwide estate agents and surveyors from Nationwide Building Society in 1994, Spencers from National and Provincial Building Society in 1995 and London firms Faron Sutaria, PKL and John D Wood & Co. in 1997.

In 1998 the business was renamed Countrywide Assured plc and demerged from Hambros plc. After creating a franchise opportunity under the Bairstow Eves brand, the group then restarted its acquisition trail acquiring Friends Provident estate agents and surveyors (in return for a long term licence to resell Friends Provident financial products) in August 2002. Friends Provident Estate Agencies operated 104 offices across the South of England, trading as: Fulfords, Chappell & Matthews, Palmer Snell and Carson & Company and had been acquired by Friends Provident as an 80-strong chain in 1998 as part of their takeover of London and Manchester Group plc.

The life assurance business was demerged as Chesnara in May 2004.

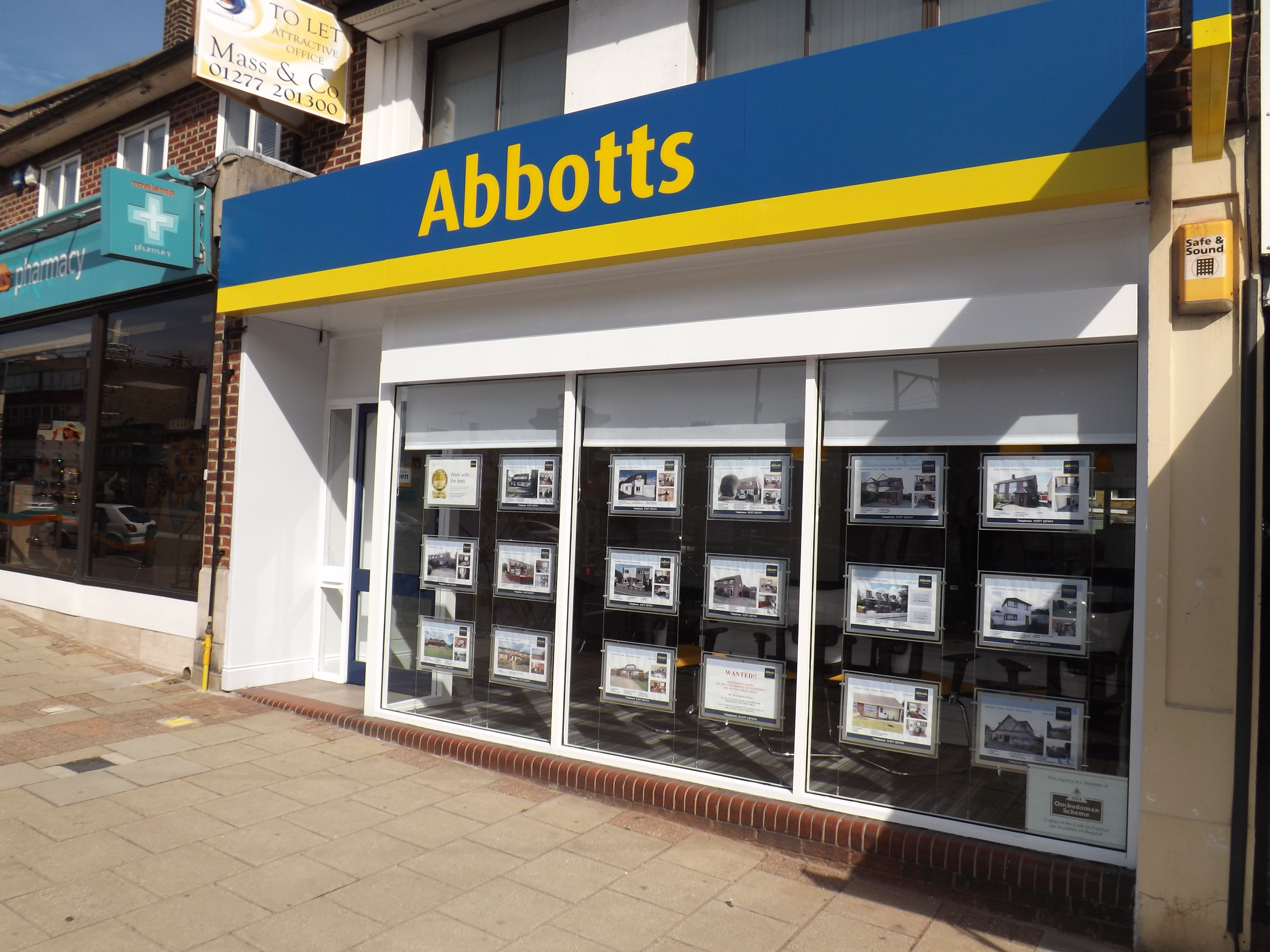
Branch of subsidiary Abbotts, Shenfield

In 2004 it acquired Freeman Foreman group as well as the estate agency business of Bradford and Bingley Building Society. This business had been originally formed as Black Horse Agencies Group by Lloyds Bank in 1982, and purchased as 370 strong chain (including TSB Property Services and Slater Hogg & Howison) by Bradford and Bingley from the then owners Lloyds TSB in April 1998. Slater Hogg & Howison had been acquired by TSB Scotland in 1988 having been established in 1975 by Roy Slater, Iain Hogg and Geoff Howison. The Black Horse name was dropped by Bradford and Bingley in 1999.

In 2007, Countrywide was 100% acquired by Apollo Management for a sum over £1bn, and de-listed from the London Stock Exchange. Following debt restructuring, the owners included Apollo Management, Oaktree Capital Management and Alchemy Partners.

In March 2013, Countrywide plc was re-listed on the London Stock Exchange.

In November 2013, Countrywide acquired national commercial property consultancy Lambert Smith Hampton (LSH).

Countrywide acquired the southwest Wales estate agency John Francis in 2015.

In January 2018, an unscheduled profits warning sent Countrywide's share price plummeting by nearly 19 per cent, and CEO Alison Platt stepped down, to be replaced by Peter Long, appointed executive chairman until a new CEO is found.

In August 2018, the share price fell by 60% after an emergency cash call (in the form of a rights issue), and after having downgrading profit forecasts four times in eight months.

In December 2020 Connells Group agree to buy the company at a valuation of circa £82 million.

On 8 March 2021 Connells Group acquired Countrywide Plc.

== Brands ==
- Abbotts
- Accord Lets
- Alan de Maid
- Andrew Reeves
- APW Lettings
- Ashby Lowery
- Ashton Burkinshaw
- Austin & Wyatt
- Bairstow Eves
- Beresford Adams
- Blundells
- Bridgfords
- Bulmers Letting
- Chappell & Matthews
- Chattings
- CHK Mountford
- CityLets York
- Clive Watkin Partnership
- CM Rent & Sales
- Country & Waterside Prestige
- Countrywide Scotland
- Cryers Lettings
- Dixons
- Entwistle Green
- Finders Keepers
- Frank Innes
- Freeman Foreman
- Fulfords
- Gascoigne-Pees
- Geering & Colyer
- Hamptons International
- John D Wood & Co.
- John Francis
- King & Chasemore
- Lighthouse Property Services
- Mann
- Mid Cornwall
- Miller Countrywide
- Morris Dibben
- Palmer Snell
- R.A. Bennett & Partners
- Regal Residential Lettings
- Slater Hogg & Howison
- Spencers
- Stratton Creber
- Sutton Kersh
- Taylors
- Tucker Gardner
- Urban Spaces
- Watson Bull & Porter
- Wilson Peacock
- Woods
