= Polo in the Park =

British polo tournament

Polo in the Park is an annual three-day polo tournament in Hurlingham Park, Fulham, London.

It was started in 2009 by Daniel Fox-Davies and Rory Heron. It is now the world's largest three-day polo tournament.

Hurlingham Park was the venue for Polo at the 1908 Summer Olympics.
