= John Wood (professor of law) =

British academic (1928–2014)

Sir John Crossley Wood
- Born: 3 January 1928
- Died: 9 April 2014 (aged 86)
- Occupation: Professor of Law

Academic work
- Discipline: Law

Sir John Crossley Wood (3 January 1928 – 9 April 2014) was a British academic who was professor of law and Dean of the School of Law at the University of Sheffield. For his work as an industrial arbitrator and conciliator he was appointed a CBE and then granted a knighthood.

== Career ==
His principal subjects were Criminal Law and Employment Law, and he published extensively (books and articles) in those two subjects. He played an important part in building student numbers in the Law School from 13 in 1955 to over 2,000 by 2000. He lectured and tutored students in those subjects throughout his academic career.

Sir John had wide experience of practical relations as inter alia a chairman of wages councils, chairman of the Central Arbitration Committee and the leading member of the ACAS panel of industrial arbitrators.

His roles and titles include:

- Chairman of a Mental Health Review Tribunal
- Honorary Fellow of the Royal College of Psychiatrists
- Government Adviser in the field of industrial relations
- Chairman of ACAS (the Arbitration, Conciliation and Advisory Service)
- Chairman of the Central Arbitration Committee
- UK representative on the International Labour Organization (ILO)
- Chairman of the ILO's Committee of Experts.

== Publications ==
- "Industrial Law" - Smith & Wood - Butterworths
- "Cases and Materials on Criminal Law" - Elliott & Wood - Sweet & Maxwell
