= Dechra Pharmaceuticals =

Pharmaceutical Company based in UK

Dechra
- Type: Private
- Traded as: LSE: DPH
- Industry: Pharmaceuticals
- Founded: 1997
- Headquarters: Boston, Massachusetts
- Key people: Jesper Nordengaard, (CEO)
- Revenue: ▲£681.8 million (2022)
- Operating income: ▲£174.3 million (2022)
- Net income: ▲£58.2 million (2022)
- Number of employees: 2,036 (2022)
- Website: www.dechra.com

Dechra is a business involved in the development and marketing of veterinary products based in Boston, Massachusetts. It was listed on the London Stock Exchange until it was acquired by EQT AB in January 2024.

== History ==
The Company was founded in 1997 by way of a management buy-out from Lloyds Chemists. It was first listed on the London Stock Exchange in 2000. In 2007 it bought VetXX, a Danish veterinary products business, for £62 million. In 2010 it purchased Florida-based DermaPet for US$64 million and Sussex-based Genitrix for £5 million.

It sold its veterinary services business to US-firm, Patterson Companies, for £87.5m in July 2013 in order to focus on its higher margin manufacturing business.

In June 2023, the private equity organisation, EQT AB, made an agreed takeover offer for the company which valued the company at £4.5 billion. In December 2023, it was confirmed that all the necessary antitrust and regulatory approvals had been obtained and that the transaction would complete on 16 January 2024.

In June 2026, the company moved its global headquarters to Boston, Massachusetts.

== Operations ==
The company sells various pharmaceuticals for common pets and farm animals – mainly for dogs, cats, equine and food producing animals. Their notable products include Vetoryl, a medicine for Cushing's disease in dogs, and Felimazole, medicine for hyperthyroidism in cats. The company is organised into two regional divisions: European Pharmaceuticals and U.S. Pharmaceuticals.

== See also ==
- Pharmaceutical industry in the United Kingdom
