= Connells Group =

British estate agency and property services company

Connells Limited

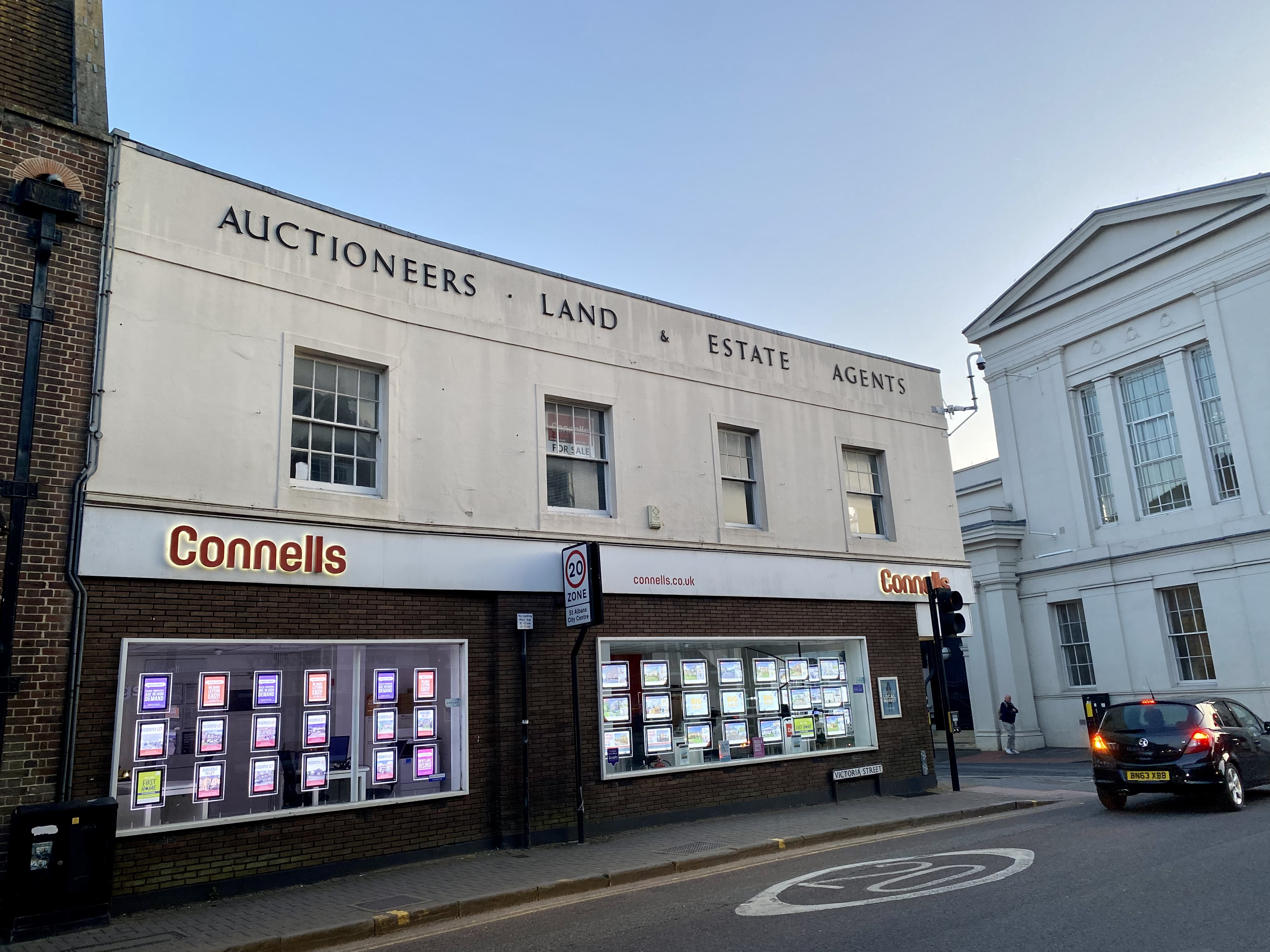
- Branch in St Albans
- Type: Limited company
- Industry: Real estate
- Founded: 1936 (Luton)
- Headquarters: Leighton Buzzard, England, UK
- Key people: Helen Charlesworth (Chief Executive)
- Parent: Skipton Building Society
- Website: www.connellsgroup.co.uk

Connells Limited, trading as Connells Group, is a British estate agency and property services company headquartered in Leighton Buzzard, England. It is a subsidiary of Skipton Building Society.

== History ==
In 1936 the first Connells estate agency branch was opened in Luton, Bedfordshire.

Connells acquired Sequence estate agency in 2003, increasing its estate agency network to around 500 branches. In the same year, Connells acquired estate agency Sharman Quinney.

In 2008 Connells Group sold its remaining 18% stake in Rightmove plc.

In 2010 Skipton Building Society acquired nearly 100% of Connells Group. In the same year, Connells Group acquired a major shareholding in Vibrant Energy Matters.

In 2011 Connells Group acquired a shareholding in the conveyancing and remortgaging panel management services provider LMS Group. In the same year, Connells acquired independent estate agency Burchell Edwards including conveyancing firm Be Legal.

In 2012 Connells acquired a 25% strategic stake in residential property fund manager, Hearthstone Investments plc.

In 2014 Connells Group acquired the Peter Alan chain, which operates in south Wales, from the Principality Building Society for £16.4m.

In 2015 Connells group acquired the Liverpool business of Farrell Heyworth an independent Estate Agent, based in the North West of England.

In 2015 Connells Group acquired Gascoigne Halman estate agency, based in the North West of England.

In 2015 Connells Group acquired Gilbert & Thomas, based in Rutland.

In 2016 Connells Group acquired Rook Matthews Sayer estate agency, based in Newcastle upon Tyne.

In 2016 Connells Group acquired Paul Dubberley, based in the West Midlands.

In 2016 Connells Group acquired Touchstone Residential, operating in Kent, Buckinghamshire and the west country.

In 2021, the group purchased Countrywide, with branches across the UK.

In 2025, the group sold its Mortgage Intelligence Network to OneDome, a British housing and fintech platform.

== Criticism ==
Connells Estate Agents have faced criticism on a number occasions of hard selling and pressuring clients to use the groups in-house mortgage services using tactics such as not allowing viewings or to place offers on properties before signing up to the in-house service.

In February 2016 Connells appeared on a list of 92 companies which had in at least one instance been found to have failed to pay the minimum wage to employees. In April 2018 Connells Survey and Valuation business was named in the top 10 of UK companies with the highest gender pay gap.
