= William Wood =

William Wood may refer to:

== Banking ==
- William Wood (banker, born 1808) (1808–1894), Scottish-American banker
- William Henry O'Malley Wood (1856–1941), Australian banker, public servant and surveyor

== Entertainment ==
- William B. Wood (actor) (1779–1861), American theatre manager and actor
- William Wood (ventriloquist) (c. 1861–1908), American illusionist and ventriloquist
- Will Wood, American alternative singer-songwriter and lead singer of The Tapeworms
- Merlyn Wood (William Anku Kraka Mawuli Andoh Wood Jr., born 1996), American vocalist for the band Brockhampton

== Government ==
=== Civil servants ===
- William P. Wood (1820–1903), first director of the United States Secret Service
- W. A. R. Wood (William Alfred Rae Wood) (1878–1970), British diplomat in Siam
- Sir William Alan Wood (1916–2010), British civil servant
- William McKenzie Wood, Canadian ambassador to Israel in 1965
- William Braucher Wood (born 1950), American diplomat, former U.S. ambassador to Afghanistan and Colombia

=== Politicians ===
- William Wood (Berkshire MP), member of parliament for Berkshire, 1395
- William Wood (Winchester MP), MP for Winchester, 1413–1416
- William Wood (Virginia politician) (fl. 1830–1844), member of the Virginia House of Delegates
- William Wood, 1st Baron Hatherley (1801–1881), British statesman and Lord Chancellor
- William Wood (Pontefract MP) (1816–1872), British MP for Pontefract
- William Wood (politician, born 1827) (1827–1884), New Zealand politician, MP for Invercargill and Mataura
- William Wood (Texas politician), member of the Twentieth Texas Legislature (1887–1888)
- William Thomas Wood (1854–1943), New Zealand politician
- W. D. Wood (William D. Wood, 1858–1917), mayor of Seattle
- William R. Wood (Indiana politician) (1861–1933), U.S. representative from Indiana
- William Wood (Australian politician) (1869–1953), member of the New South Wales Parliament
- William Robertson Wood (1874–1947), Canadian Presbyterian minister and member of the Legislative Assembly of Manitoba

== Industry ==
- William Wood (ironmaster) (1671–1730), British ironmaster and mint master
- William Willis Wood (mayor) (1844–1905), English mill owner, Wesleyan Methodist preacher and mayor of Bradford
- William Bruce Wood (1848–1928), Canadian mill owner and political figure in Ontario
- William Madison Wood (1858–1926), American textile mill owner in Massachusetts
- William B. Wood (builder) (fl. 1890s), American building contractor in Kentucky
- Sir William Valentine Wood (1883–1959), Irish-born president of the London, Midland and Scottish Railway, 1941–1947

== Military ==
- William Maxwell Wood (1809–1880), United States Navy officer and surgeon, first Surgeon General of the U.S. Navy
  - USS William M. Wood, the name of three ships of the U.S. Navy (two canceled, one built)
- William W. Wood (1818–1882), U.S. Navy engineer and head of the Bureau of Steam Engineering
- William D. Wood (1822–1867), American Union brevet brigadier general
- William T. Wood (1854–1943), officer in the United States Army

== Science and medicine ==
- William Wood (botanist) (1745–1808), English botanist and Unitarian minister
- William Wood (zoologist) (1774–1857), English entomologist
- William Wood (Scottish surgeon) (1782–1858), Scottish surgeon
- William Wood (naturalist) (1822–1885), American physician and naturalist
- William Barry Wood III (1938–2024), American molecular and developmental biologist

== Sports ==
=== Football (soccer) ===
- William Wood (footballer, born 1900) (1900–?), English football player for Aberdare Athletic and Stoke
- William Wood (footballer, born 1904) (1904–1961), English footballer, goalkeeper for Rochdale
- William Wood (footballer, born April 1910) (1910–?), English football defender for Burnley and Yeovil Town
- William Wood (footballer, born June 1910) (1910–1958), English footballer for several teams including Blackburn Rovers and Burnley
- Will Wood (footballer) (born 1996), English football defender for several teams including Ebbsfleet United

=== Other sports ===
- William Wood (toxophilite) (1609–1691), English archer
- William Wood (cricketer) (1849–1924), Australian cricketer
- William Wood (runner) (1881–1940), English-born Canadian marathon runner
- William Wood (wrestler) (1886–1971), British wrestler
- William Wood (rower) (1899–1969), Canadian rower and Olympic silver medalist
- William H. Wood (American football) (1900–1988), American gridiron football coach and United States Army officer
- William Wood (diver) (1946–2000), English competition diver

== Trade unions ==
- William Henry Wood (fl. 1860s), British trade union leader
- William H. Wood, American labor union leader, first president of the National Association of Letter Carriers, 1889–1890
- William Wood (trade unionist, born 1873) (1873–1956), British trade union leader

== Others ==
- William Wightman Wood (fl. 1804–1833), American journalist, businessman and poet
- William Halsey Wood (1855–1897), American architect
- William Charles Henry Wood (1864–1947), Canadian historian
- William J. Wood (1877–1954), Canadian painter and etcher
- William Ransom Wood (1907–2001), president of the University of Alaska, 1960–1973
- William Wood (screenwriter), American screenwriter

== See also ==
- Bill Wood (disambiguation)
- Willie Wood (disambiguation)
- William Woods (disambiguation)
- William Wood-Sims (1858–1925), English cricketer
