= William Woods =

William, Bill or Billy Woods may refer to:

== Politicians ==
- William Woods (New York politician) (1790–1837), American lawyer from New York, served 1823–1825
- William Burnham Woods (1824–1887), American jurist and Civil War general from Ohio
- William Cleaver Woods (1852–1943), Australian physician, medical scientist and politician
- William Carlton Woods (1891–1965), Canadian farmer and politician from Saskatchewan
- William Woods (Irish politician) (died 1966), independent member of Seanad Éireann

== Sportsmen ==
- Bill Woods (Australian footballer) (1890–1972), player with Geelong in VFL
- Willie Woods (1898–1927), American baseball outfielder in the 1920s Negro leagues
- Billy Woods (New Zealand footballer), New Zealand footballer
- Billy Woods (footballer, born 1926) (1926–1980), English footballer who played in the 1949–50 Rochdale A.F.C. season
- Billy Woods (Irish footballer) (born 1973), winger, later coach with Cork City
- William Woods (pitcher) (born 1998), American baseball pitcher

== Other people ==
- Sir William Woods (officer of arms) (1785–1842), British Clarenceux King of Arms in 1831, promoted to Garter in 1838
- William Allen Woods (1837–1901), American federal judge
- William Maitland Woods (1864–1927), English Anglican minister and military chaplain in Australia
- William Aaron Woods (born 1942), American researcher in natural language processing and semantics
- William E. Woods (1949–2008), American gay rights activist in Hawaii
- Bill Woods (born 1962), Australian television broadcaster
- Billy Woods, American hip-hop artist, active since the 1990s
- William Woods, victim of identity theft by Matthew David Keirans
- William Woods (RAF officer) (1913–1941), Irish WWII fighter ace

== Other uses ==
- SS William B. Woods, a Liberty ship

== See also ==
- William Woods Holden (1818–1892), governor of North Carolina, 1865 and 1868–1871
- William Woods University, American university in Fulton, Missouri, established 1870
- William Wood (disambiguation)
