= General Wood =

General Wood may also refer to:

- Elliott Wood (1844–1931), British Army major general
- Eric Fisher Wood (1888–1962), Pennsylvania National Guard general
- Evelyn Wood (British Army officer) (1838–1919), British Army general
- George Wood (British Army officer) (1898–1982), British Army major general
- Henry Clay Wood (1832–1918), U.S. Army brigadier general
- James Wood (New York politician) (1820–1892), Union Army brigadier general and brevet major general
- James Wood (governor) (1741–1813), Virginia Militia brigadier general following the American Revolutionary War
- Sir James Wood, 2nd Baronet (died 1738), British Army major general
- John M. Wood (general) (1820–1892), New York Militia brigadier general and Union Army brevet major general
- John Shirley Wood (1888–1966), U.S. Army major general
- Leonard Wood (1860–1927), U.S. Army major general.
- Robert E. Wood (1879–1969), U.S. Army brigadier general
- Robert J. Wood (1905–1986), U.S. Army four-star general
- S. A. M. Wood (1823–1891), Confederate States Army brigadier general
- Thomas Wood (British Army officer) (1804–1872), British Army general
- Thomas J. Wood (1823–1906), Union Army major general
- William D. Wood (1822–1867), Union Army brigadier general
- William H. Wood (American football) (1900–1988), U.S. Army brigadier general

== See also ==
- Minnie Hollow Wood (c. 1856–1930s), Lakota woman who earned the right to wear a war bonnet because of her valor in combat against the U.S. Cavalry at the Battle of Little Big Horn
- General Woods (disambiguation)
