= Barry Douglas (disambiguation) =

Barry Douglas(s) is the name of:

- Barry Douglas (pianist) (born 1960), classical pianist and conductor
- Barry Douglas (footballer) (born 1989), Scottish footballer
- Barry Douglas (professional wrestler) real name Doug de Relswykow, grandson of Olympic wrestler George de Relwyskow
