= John G. Coltart =

Confederate States Army officer

John Gordon Coltart
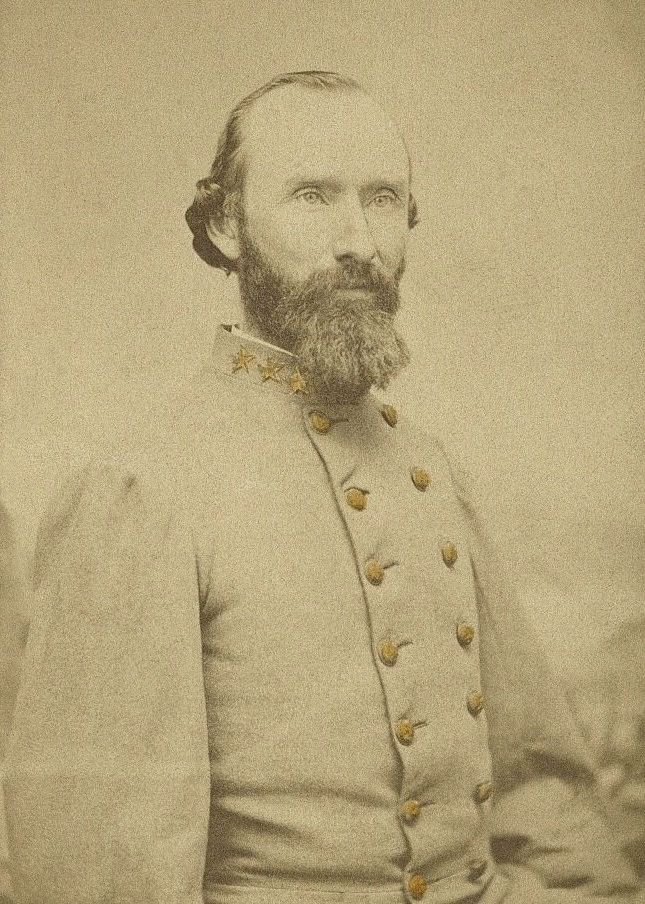
- A wartime carte-de-visite of Coltart
- Born: January 27, 1826; Huntsville, Alabama, U.S.
- Died: April 16, 1868 (aged 42) Tuscaloosa, Alabama, U.S.
- Buried: Maple Hill Cemetery
- Allegiance: Confederate States of America
- Branch: Confederate States Army
- Service years: 1861–1865
- Rank: Colonel
- Commands: 3rd Alabama Battalion (Coltart's); 7th Alabama Infantry Regiment; 26th/50th Alabama Infantry Regiment; Deas' Brigade; D. H. Hill's Division
- Conflicts: American Civil War; Battle of Shiloh; Battle of Stones River; Battle of Chickamauga; Battle of Missionary Ridge; Atlanta campaign; Battle of Franklin; Battle of Nashville; Battle of Bentonville
- Other work: Businessman, county sheriff

John Gordon Coltart (January 27, 1826 – April 16, 1868) was a Confederate States Army officer who held regiment, brigade and division command during the American Civil War.

During the antebellum period, Coltart became a businessman in Huntsville. He captained the local volunteer militia company and at the beginning of the war rose to battalion command at Pensacola. Coltart served as lieutenant colonel and colonel of the 7th Alabama Infantry Regiment, expanded from his battalion, during 1861 and early 1862. However, his troops refused to enlist under him due to his reputation for strict discipline and instead Coltart was placed in command of the new 26th Alabama Infantry Regiment just before the Battle of Shiloh.

Wounded leading the regiment at Shiloh, Coltart held temporary brigade command at Stones River. He was detached for conscription duty due to the consolidation of the regiment in early 1863. Returning to command of the regiment, redesignated as the 50th Alabama, Coltart led it at Chickamauga, Missionary Ridge and in the Atlanta Campaign. Again in command of Zachariah C. Deas' brigade at the Battle of Atlanta, Coltart was wounded at the Battle of Ezra Church, knocking him out of action for the rest of the campaign. Coltart led the 50th Alabama again during the Franklin–Nashville campaign. In the final weeks of the war, he commanded Daniel Harvey Hill's much-reduced division at Wyse Fork and Bentonville. Briefly serving as a country sheriff, Coltart died in an insane asylum three years after the end of the war.

== Antebellum period ==
John Gordon Coltart was born on January 27, 1826, in the town of Huntsville, Alabama, the son of Scottish immigrant Samuel Coltart, one of the founders of the town and its former mayor. He became a bookseller, druggist and insurance agent in Huntsville. Coltart became wealthy through his businesses, and in 1855 organized and captained the local volunteer militia company, the socially prestigious Madison Rifles. His brother, Robert, served as first sergeant.

== American Civil War ==
=== Pensacola, Tennessee and Kentucky ===
Following the secession of Alabama, Coltart's Madison Rifles entered state service and departed for Mobile on March 26, 1861. From there, the company was sent to join Braxton Bragg's Confederate forces at Pensacola besieging the Union-held Fort Pickens. Coltart was elected lieutenant colonel of the 3rd Alabama Battalion, which included the Madison Rifles as its Company E, on April 2. Coltart was re-elected as lieutenant colonel when the regiment was expanded into the 7th Alabama Infantry Regiment on May 18. The Madison Rifles became Company D of the latter under Captain Oliver B. Gaston. The 7th Alabama spent most of 1861 building fortifications and other routine duties at Pensacola, a relatively quiet part of the war, and suffered more deaths from disease than enemy action. Due to the frequent absence of the regiment's colonel, S. A. M. Wood, Coltart was often left in command of the unit, and became unpopular for his insistence on strict military discipline. Private John W. James of the regiment recalled that Coltart, though a "good military man," was "wanting in that something which inspires the confidence of men." Despite this, Coltart was considered by his men to be physically brave in combat.

In November, the 7th Alabama was sent to Chattanooga to suppress the East Tennessee bridge burnings, a Southern Unionist uprising against the Confederacy. Wood delegated command of the regiment to Coltart in its attempted dispersion of a guerrilla camp up the Tennessee River from Chattanooga and the subsequent roundup of suspected Unionists. While near Chattanooga, Coltart forbade the men of the regiment from going out for wood and water without being accompanied by a sergeant and limiting the number of men who could be out of the lines, causing a near-mutiny in his old company. Other disciplinary problems arose due to alcohol, with a civilian being publicly whipped for selling the soldiers whiskey.

After the suppression of the uprising, the regiment joined Albert Sidney Johnston's Army of Central Kentucky at Bowling Green, Kentucky, in December. The regiment spent the winter in routine duties and building fortifications. After Wood was promoted to brigade command there, Coltart succeeded him as colonel of the regiment on February 5, 1862. The 7th Alabama served in the rear guard of the army later that month as it retreated to Corinth, Mississippi, after a series of Confederate defeats in early 1862. When Confederate forces in the Western theater of the war united at Corinth in March, the service terms of the companies of the 7th Alabama began to expire. Due to Coltart's unpopularity, the men of the regiment refused to re-enlist under his command. Addressing the unit, Coltart blamed the officers of the 7th Alabama, claiming that "the truth is it is yourselves that want office and are afraid that you will not get it." Generous re-enlistment incentives were in vain and the regiment was accordingly disbanded in late March as its companies were discharged from service. Most of its men re-enlisted in other Alabama units.

=== Shiloh and Corinth ===
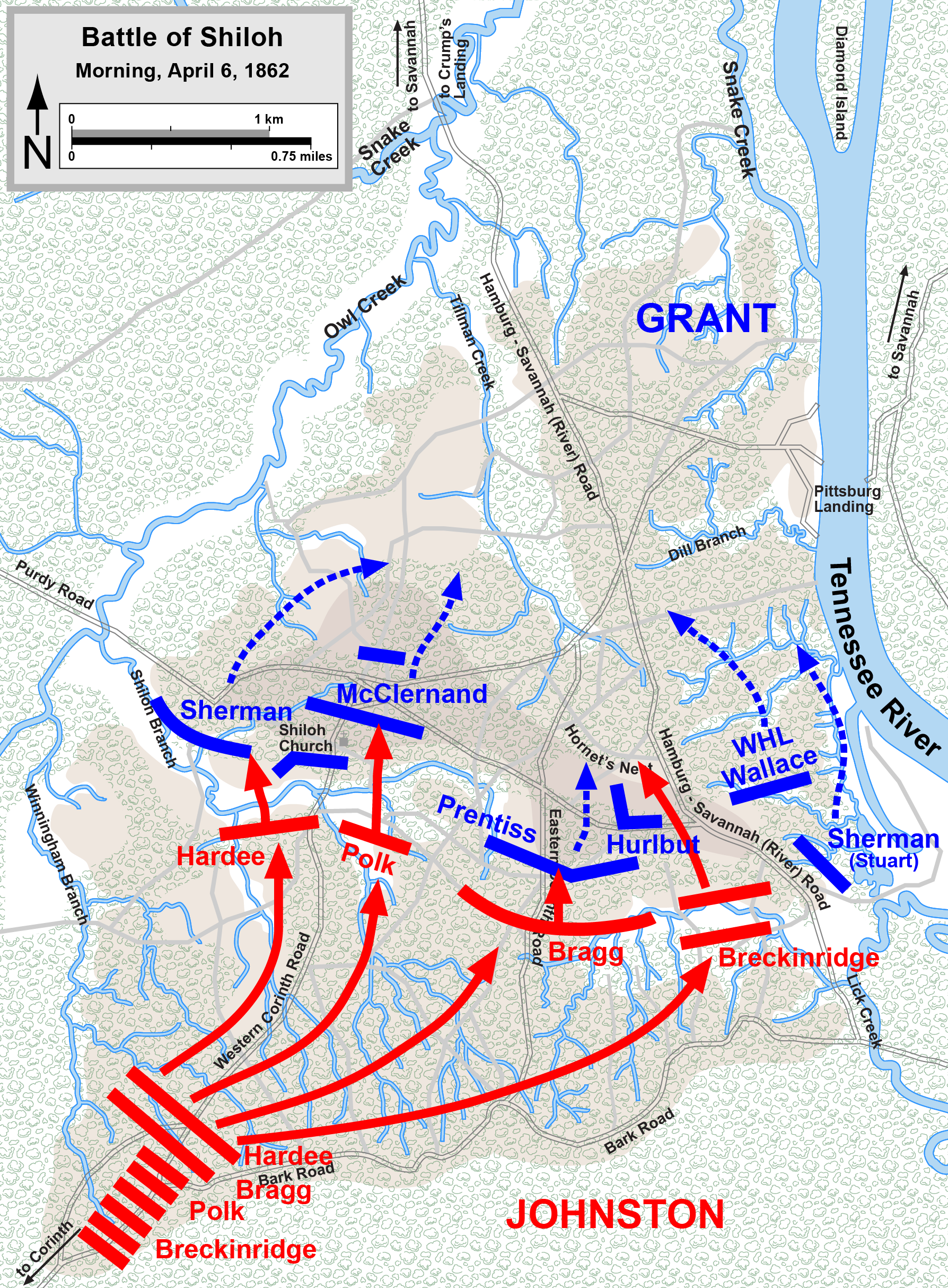
Situation at Shiloh on the morning of 6 April, note that Gladden's brigade attacked on the right of Hardee's line

Just before the Battle of Shiloh began, Coltart became colonel of the newly formed 26th Alabama, taking command of the regiment while it camped at Monterey on the night of April 3. The 26th Alabama had only just received its last four companies on March 31, allowing it to be expanded from a battalion to a regiment. However, it was an understrength unit with only 440 men present for Shiloh, in which the 26th Alabama formed part of Gladden's brigade of Withers' Division in Bragg's Corps, together with the 21st, 22nd, and 25th Alabama, the 1st Louisiana Regulars, and Robertson's Alabama Battery.

In the movement to the battle on the morning of April 6, Gladden's brigade became disorganized while crossing a creek, with the 1st Louisiana Regulars forcing the 26th Alabama out of alignment. The 26th Alabama ended up on the far right of the brigade, which charged Miller's brigade in the Spain Field around 8:00 a.m. The regiment was "hotly engaged" as Gladden's Brigade suffered heavy losses in the Spain Field but ultimately drove back the Union troops and captured their camp. The 26th Alabama halted for almost an hour along a fence line near the camp under the crossfire of duelling artillery batteries. Renewing the attack, the brigade engaged the Union troops 500 yards in front of the fence line, and the 26th Alabama moved to the left to counter a flanking attempt by the retreating Union troops. In this position the regiment found itself under heavy fire that it could not respond to, being masked by a retreating Confederate battery to its front. Shifting right after twenty minutes in this situation, the 26th Alabama advanced into an open field, where Coltart was severely wounded in the foot and the regiment suffered heavy losses.

26th Alabama Lieutenant Colonel William D. Chadick succeeded to command of the regiment while Coltart had his wound dressed. Returning to the battle, Coltart advised Chadick to retreat seeing the "exhausted condition of the regiment" but Chadick decided to keep the unit in action, anticipating victory. Coltart's return to the fight was brief due to the severity of his wound. He was able to return to the regiment around 4:00 p.m. while it was resting in the rear, and ordered the regiment to move a few hundred yards back for the night. The 26th Alabama had been heavily engaged during the first day and lost more than half of its men. However, before the battle began on the morning of April 7, Coltart was forced to leave to return to Corinth for treatment.

After the end of the fighting, the Confederates retreated back to Corinth. During the withdrawal from the city at the end of the Siege of Corinth, Brigadier General Joseph Wheeler took over command of the brigade, which formed the Confederate rear guard, mounting a series of skirmishes and burning bridges to delay the pursuing Union troops. Coltart led the 26th Alabama in Wheeler's force during rearguard actions on the Monterey road on May 28 and 29.

=== Invasion of Kentucky and Stones River ===
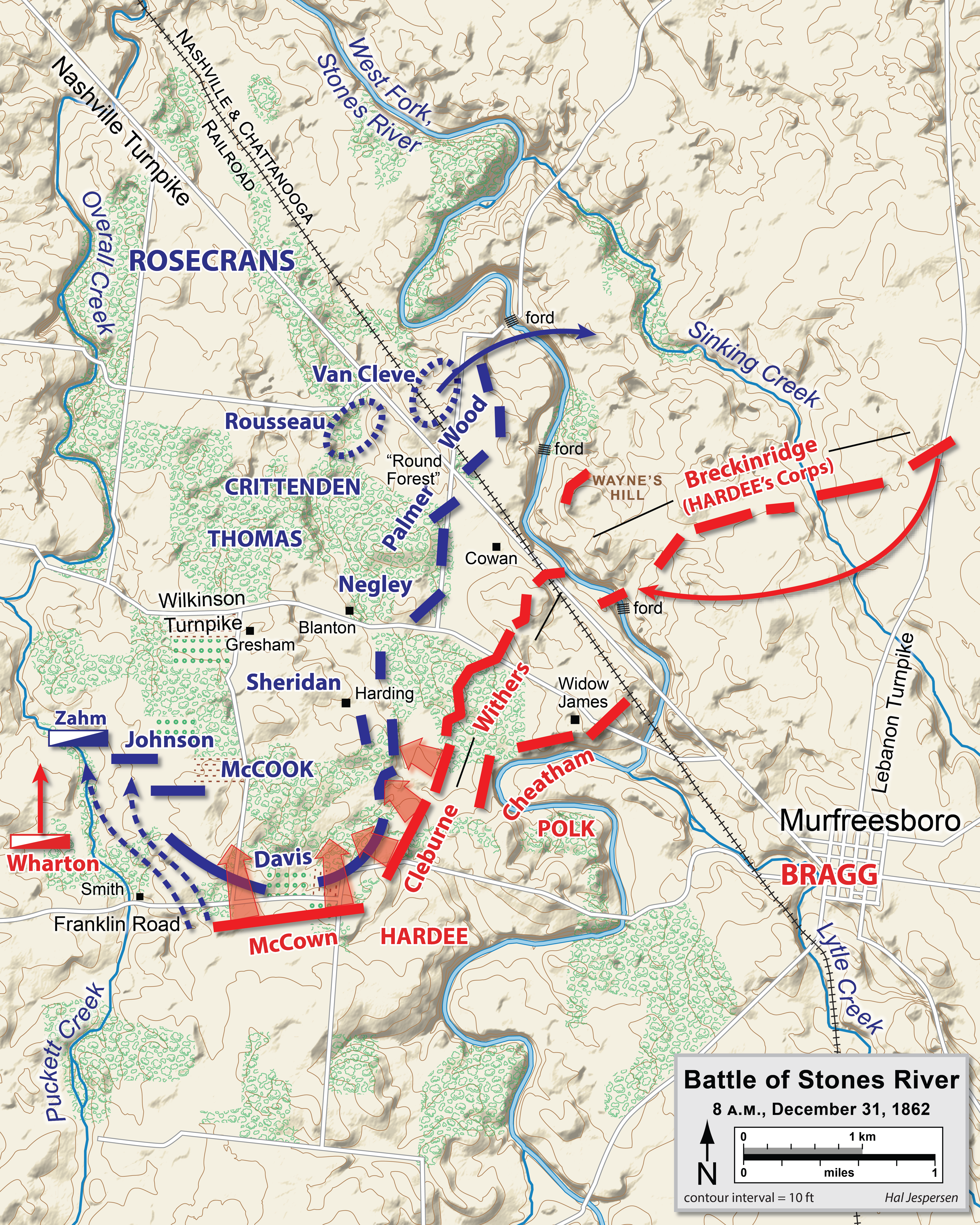
Stones River, December 31, 8:00 a.m.

With Gardner's Brigade of Withers' Division in Polk's Right Wing of Bragg's Army of Mississippi, Coltart led the 26th Alabama during the Confederate invasion of Kentucky that began in August 1862, but Withers' Division was detached and thus missed the Battle of Perryville, the major battle of the campaign. Zachariah C. Deas of the 22nd Alabama was promoted to brigadier general in December to replace Gardner, but fell ill, leaving Colonel John Q. Loomis of the 25th Alabama temporarily in command for the Battle of Stones River. The brigade was part of Withers' Division of Polk's Corps of the Army of Tennessee for the battle, and consisted of Coltart's 26th Alabama, together with the 19th, 22nd, 25th and 39th Alabama Infantry Regiments, the 1st Louisiana Regulars, the 17th Alabama Sharpshooter Battalion, and Robertson's battery.. On December 30, the day before the battle began, the 26th Alabama helped stop the Union advance by Carlin's brigade.

Loomis' Brigade was the first sent into the attack an hour behind schedule at 7:00 a.m. on December 31, having been shifted to Cheatham's Division on the night of December 30–31. Loomis led the brigade northwest from the woods east of the Widow Smith House into an open field, with the woods on the opposite side of the field held by Woodruff's brigade supported by artillery. The 26th Alabama advanced on the left of the brigade between the 39th and 22nd Alabama. However, Loomis was not yet out of the woods when he was wounded by a falling tree limb, taking him out of the fight. Command of the brigade fell to Coltart. Despite suffering heavy losses to Union fire, the brigade continued forward and routed the opposing 25th Illinois and 81st Indiana on its right. Pursuing, the Confederates were caught by enfilading from the 35th Illinois, which Coltart reported "raked down our lines with heavy damage to us." The 25th Illinois and 81st Indiana rallied, pushing the right of the brigade back to their original positions. The right of Coltart's brigade had also encountered initial success against Sill's brigade, but was driven back by a simultaneous counterattack.

On the night of January 2–3, Coltart's Brigade, having been shifted back to Withers' Division, was moved up to support Chalmers' Brigade under Colonel Thomas W. White in preparation for a renewed attack on the Union positions in the Round Forest. The Union troops were forced out by the attack of Coltart's Brigade that morning, and both sides skirmished throughout the day. At dusk, the Union troops attacked through rain into the Round Forest again with two regiments from Beatty's brigade and Spears' fresh brigade following an artillery bombardment from Van Pelt's battery. Coltart's and White's Brigades were forced to retreat by the attack, losing 48 captured, but the Union troops abandoned their gains an hour later, allowing the Confederates to reoccupy their old positions. Fearing Union reinforcements and with the rising Stones River threatening to split his army, Bragg decided to retreat and Withers' Division began moving out from the battlefield on the morning of January.4.

=== Chickamauga and Chattanooga ===
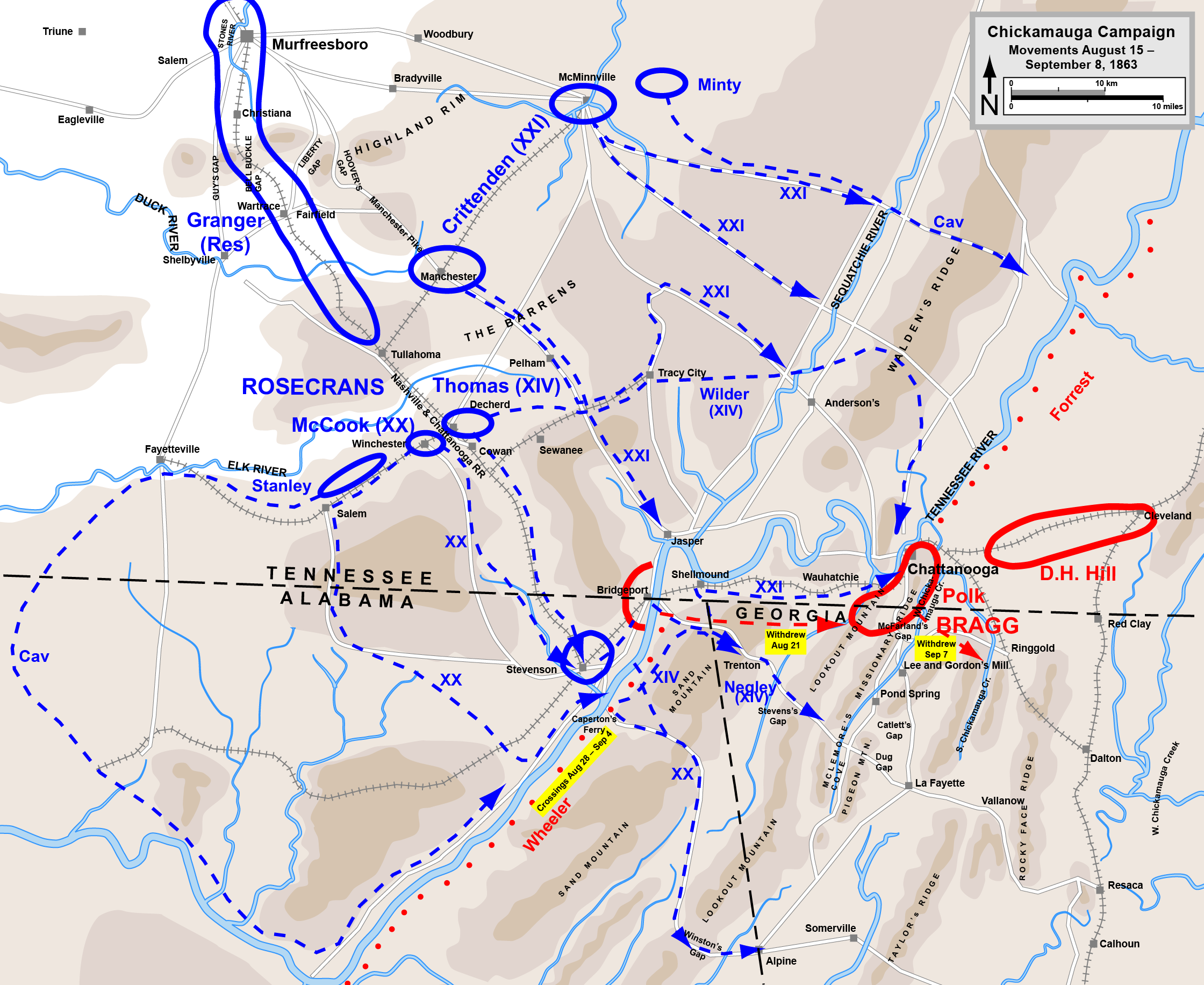
Initial movements of the Chickamauga campaign

When the 26th Alabama was consolidated in the field with the 39th Alabama in early 1863, Coltart was left without a command. He was placed on conscription duty as commander of a sub-department of the Volunteer and Conscript Bureau of the Army of Tennessee at Greeneville on March 9. Reporting to bureau chief Brigadier General Gideon Pillow at Huntsville, Coltart oversaw the officers in charge of conscription in East Tennessee and Western North Carolina. The 26th Alabama was separated from the 39th Alabama before being redesignated as the 50th Alabama on June 6. Coltart returned to command of the regiment by July. After Withers resigned from the army that month, Coltart succeeded to command the brigade as the senior colonel when Deas temporarily took command of Withers' Division. Thomas C. Hindman arrived to take command of Withers' old Division on August 13, with Deas and Coltart returning to their previous positions. During this period, the brigade was camped south of Chattanooga with the Army of Tennessee following its retreat during the Tullahoma campaign.

To guard against a potential attack by William Rosecrans' Army of the Cumberland, Bragg ordered Hindman to send two brigades into the Lookout Valley on August 19, with the latter selecting Deas' and Manigault's brigades for this task. After the Union diversionary shelling of Chattanooga began on August 21, Hindman responded by detailing Coltart's 50th Alabama to guard the Brown's Ferry crossing on the Tennessee River, which he saw as the most important location. With Chattanooga threatened by Rosecrans from the southwest, Bragg retreated to LaFayette in northwest Georgia beginning on September 8. Bragg's and Rosecrans' armies clashed in the Battle of Chickamauga on September 19 and 20, in which Hindman's Division fought under James Longstreet's Left Wing of the army. In the opening skirmishing on September 18, the 50th Alabama supported Dent's Battery in an attempt to divert Union attention on Chickamauga Creek away from fighting at Jay's Mill. The regiment faced artillery fire with only one soldier slightly wounded. In the afternoon of September 19, after the battle had begun in earnest, Hindman took his division across the creek and halted for the night to the left of Bushrod Johnson's Division in the woods south of the Brotherton Road.

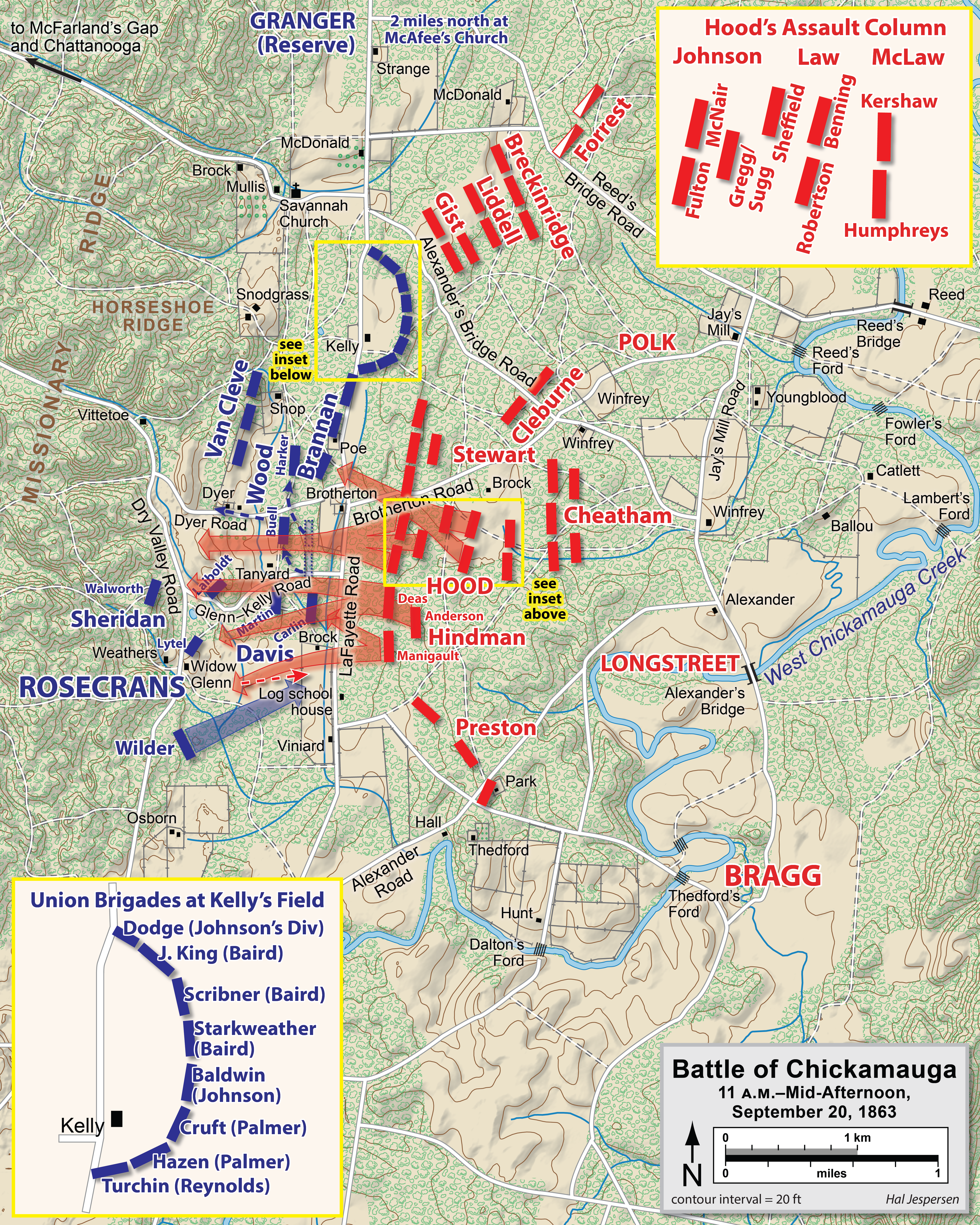
Longstreet's attack, September 20

At 11:00 a.m. on September 20, Longstreet ordered Hindman into action against Davis' Division, so reduced by the previous day's fighting that Deas' brigade alone outnumbered it. Longstreet's attack caught the Union in the midst of a realignment that left an accidental gap, enabling a Confederate breakthrough. The 50th Alabama was on the left of the brigade between the 22nd and 39th Alabama, facing Carlin's Brigade. Davis' Division collapsed under the Confederate assault, with the 50th Alabama reaching the breastworks of the 81st Indiana as the outflanked 21st Illinois was captured by the 22nd Alabama. The 81st Indiana retreated, with Coltart describing them as "being driven out, without a moment's check, in great confusion." Deas' Brigade pressed onwards to overrun Laiboldt's Brigade, and a 50th Alabama soldier captured the guidon of the 6th Ohio Battery. By now out of breath, Deas' brigade was halted by the resistance of Lytle's Brigade, holding a commanding position on what became Lytle Hill. Coltart had advanced so fast that his right received friendly fire from the 39th Alabama, disrupting the advance. The attack of Patton Anderson's neighboring brigade routed Walworth's Brigade on Lytle's right, unraveling the Union line. Deas' Brigade renewed the attack, with Coltart's regiment driving off the 24th Wisconsin and capturing two guns of the 11th Indiana Battery. Pursuing their retreating opponents for a mile, the regiment became separated from its brigade and was intermingled with Patton Anderson's Brigade. Halting to rejoin Deas, the 50th Alabama was out of the fight for the next several hours as Hindman regrouped his troops.

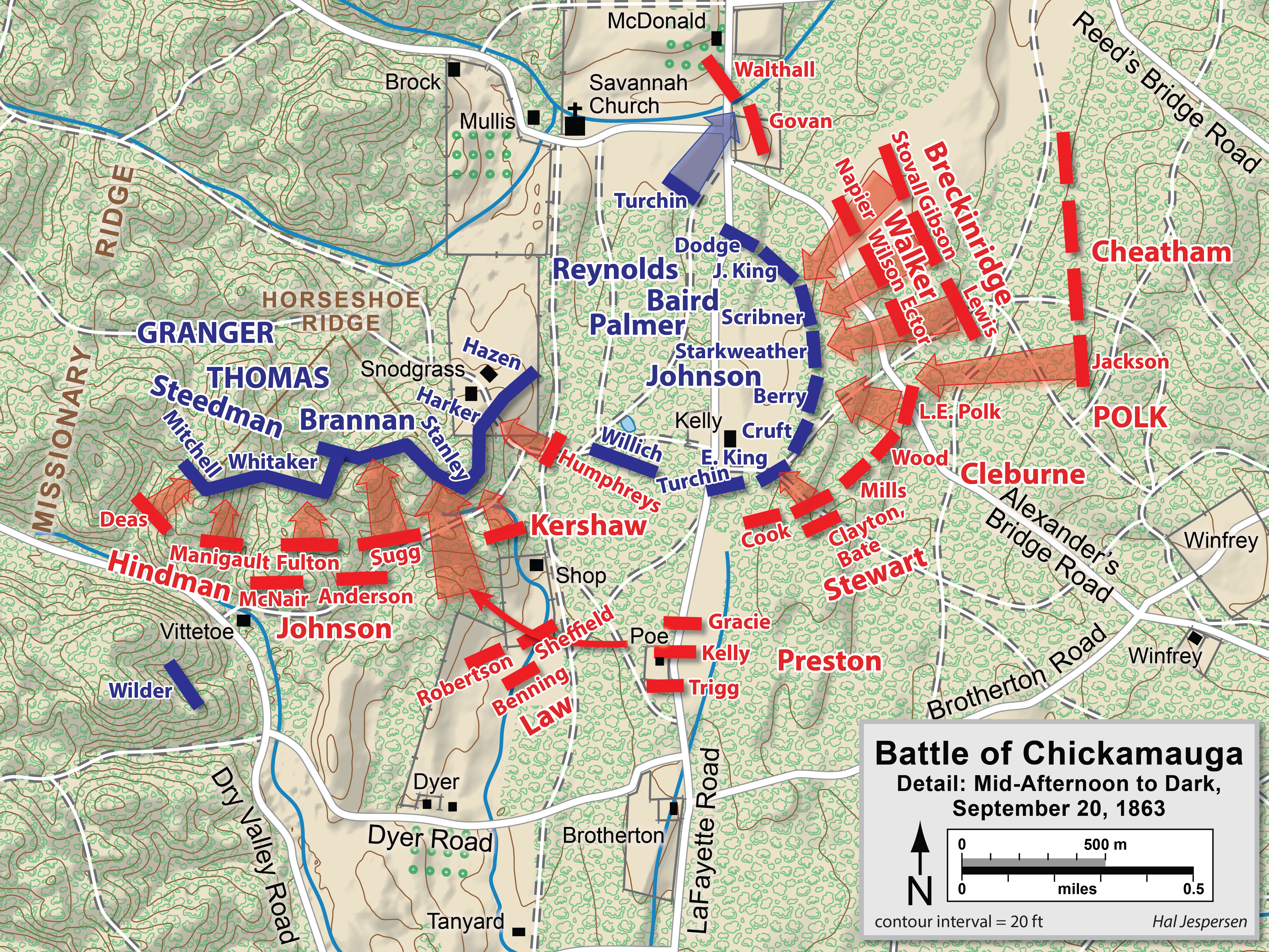
Horseshoe Ridge

Hindman moved his division up to join the assault on Horseshoe Ridge, with Deas and Manigault's brigades arriving on the left of Johnson's Division by 3:00 p.m. Johnson's Division had just been repulsed in their attack on the ridge. Hindman placed both brigades under Johnson's control, with Coltart's 50th Alabama between the 19th and 22nd Alabama. Deas' brigade made the difficult climb up the steep wooded slopes of Horseshoe Ridge at its highest point. The rough terrain split the advance of the two brigades, leaving Deas entirely unsupported. Reaching the brow of the ridge, the Alabamians were faced by the devastating fire of Battery M, 1st Illinois Light Artillery and Mitchell's Brigade. Coltart described the situation as "such a terrible fire of musketry and grape that we were compelled to fall back." Coltart and the other regimental commanders continued the assault with piecemeal charges but were similarly unsuccessful, failing to reach the Union lines. The 22nd Alabama was routed by the countercharge of the 121st Ohio, while the 50th could not be rallied for a third charge. Horseshoe Ridge was eventually captured, but Deas' brigade was out of action for the rest of the battle. Coltart's post-battle report recorded the 50th Alabama's casualties as 105 out of an estimated 313: sixteen killed, 81 wounded and eight missing.

In the subsequent Chattanooga campaign, Hindman's Division, commanded by Patton Anderson, was in the Confederate center during the Battle of Missionary Ridge. The outnumbered and poorly positioned Confederates were routed by the Union attack on November 25, with Coltart's regiment losing 45 men, mostly captured.

=== Atlanta Campaign ===
The army spent the winter of 1863–1864 encamped at Dalton, a period marked by the replacement of Bragg with Joseph E. Johnston and the shifting of Hindman's Division to John Bell Hood's Corps. Coltart led the regiment during the early stages of the Atlanta campaign, and by June 30 was back in command of the brigade due to Deas' illness. During this period, the brigade fought at Resaca, New Hope Church, and Kolb's Farm. Perceived as insufficiently aggressive, Johnston was replaced by Hood on July 18, and Cheatham took over Hood's Corps. John C. Brown became division commander after Hindman's wounding. During the Battle of Atlanta on July 22, the brigade advanced south of the Georgia Railroad around 3:30 p.m. Driving off the Union pickets, the brigade lost its alignment with Manigault's brigade and ended up attacking farther south against the relatively weak positions of Williams' brigade at 4:15 p.m. Despite this advantage, Coltart's troops were repulsed twice and only prevailed when Sharp's brigade broke through to the north and fired into the rear of the Union troops. The Confederate gains proved temporary, as twenty minutes later Coltart's brigade was driven back by the counterattack of Oliver's brigade.

Coltart reverted to regimental command when Colonel George D. Johnston of the 25th Alabama was promoted to brigade command as a reward for performance at Atlanta. After Atlanta, Cheatham was replaced in command of the corps by Stephen D. Lee. For the Battle of Ezra Church on July 28, the brigade was on the right of Brown's division, taking over for the wounded Hindman. Brown's advance began at 11:45 a.m. against Williams' and Oliver's Brigades, which the division had faced six days earlier. Coltart was wounded as the advance began but continued to lead the 50th Alabama in its charge against the Union breastworks. Johnston was wounded and command fell to Coltart, who himself only remained on the battlefield for a few minutes before he was also forced out of the fight by his wound. Lieutenant Colonel Harry T. Toulmin of the 22nd Alabama took over the leaderless brigade and called off the attack, which had been repulsed in fifteen minutes. Coltart was out of action for the remainder of the campaign, returning to command of the 50th Alabama by September 20, with the brigade now under the returned Deas.

=== Nashville and the Carolinas ===
During Hood's failed invasion of Tennessee in the Franklin–Nashville campaign, the 50th Alabama suffered heavy losses at the Battle of Franklin on November 30. Coltart's regiment fought in the Battle of Nashville in which Deas' and Manigault's brigades "fled, after making but feeble resistance" in the face of the Union attack on December 15. By January 1865, the unit had been shifted to Augusta, where Daniel Harvey Hill commanded the District of Georgia. On January 29 Hill sent 900 men under Coltart to reinforce G. W. Smith at Green's Cut. When Hill's remnants of the Army of Tennessee reached Kinston on March 7 to join Bragg's forces, Hill moved up to command Lee's Corps and Coltart became commander of Hill's Division, consisting of Deas' and Manigault's Brigades, under Toulmin and John C. Carter, respectively. This was a division in name only as the two brigades had an effective strength of only 562 for the ensuing Battle of Wyse Fork. After Hoke's Division broke through the Union lines on March 8, Hill personally led Coltart's division and Pettus' brigade against the Union right, routing the Union opposition and cutting off their retreat. However, Bragg called off Hill's attack before the Confederates could achieve victory. The division was relegated to a supporting role on March 9 as Hoke mounted the main attack and on March 10 Coltart deployed his right regiment as skirmishers to cover Hill's left. With Hoke driven back, Hill could not attack the reinforced Union troops in his sector and the Confederates withdrew from the field that night.

Coltart continued to command the division in the Battle of Bentonville, the last attack of Johnston's army. Hill took direct command of two other brigades and Coltart's Division in an attack on the rear and left of Morgan's Division on March 19. Morgan's Division thus faced piecemeal assaults, but the Confederates were successful until the counterattack of Cogswell's Brigade turned the tide. Struck on three sides by the latter, taking advantage of a gap in the Confederate lines, Hill's troops were routed. The Confederate line was re-established when Cogswell was repulsed by Loring's reserve troops, but Hill's Corps would not see significant action for the rest of the battle, which ended in another retreat. Coltart was left without a command when Johnston reorganized the much reduced army on April 9. After Johnston's army surrendered, Coltart was paroled on May 15 at Marion, Alabama.

== Later life ==
Returning to Huntsville, Coltart was appointed sheriff of Madison County by Governor Robert M. Patton in July 1866. With the beginning of military rule of the former Confederate states under the Reconstruction Acts in 1867, Coltart was removed as sheriff and replaced by a Unionist due to his status as an ex-Confederate. Similarly, his brother Robert was removed as mayor of Huntsville. Coltart was taken at his own request to the state lunatic asylum in Tuscaloosa in early 1868, where he died on April 16 of that year and was buried at Maple Hill Cemetery in Huntsville.
