= Bill Wood =

Bill Wood may refer to:

- Bill Wood (American football) (1894–1966), American football player and coach, head football coach at Gettysburg College and Wesleyan University
- Bill Wood (Australian footballer) (1921–1989), Australian rules footballer
- Bill Wood (footballer, born 1927) (1927–2010), English footballer
- Bill Wood (politician) (1935–2024), Australian politician
- Bill Wood (baseball) (born 1941), American baseball executive

== See also ==
- William Wood (disambiguation)
