= William H. Wood =

William H. Wood may refer to:

- William H. Wood, president of the National Association of Letter Carriers, 1889–90
- William H. Wood (American football) (1900–1988), American athlete, and football coach at the United States Military Academy
- William Halsey Wood (1855–1897), American architect, based in Newark, New Jersey
- William Henry Wood, British trade unionist, active in the 1860s

== See also ==
- William Wood (disambiguation)
