= 7th Alabama Infantry Regiment =

Infantry regiment of the Confederate States Army

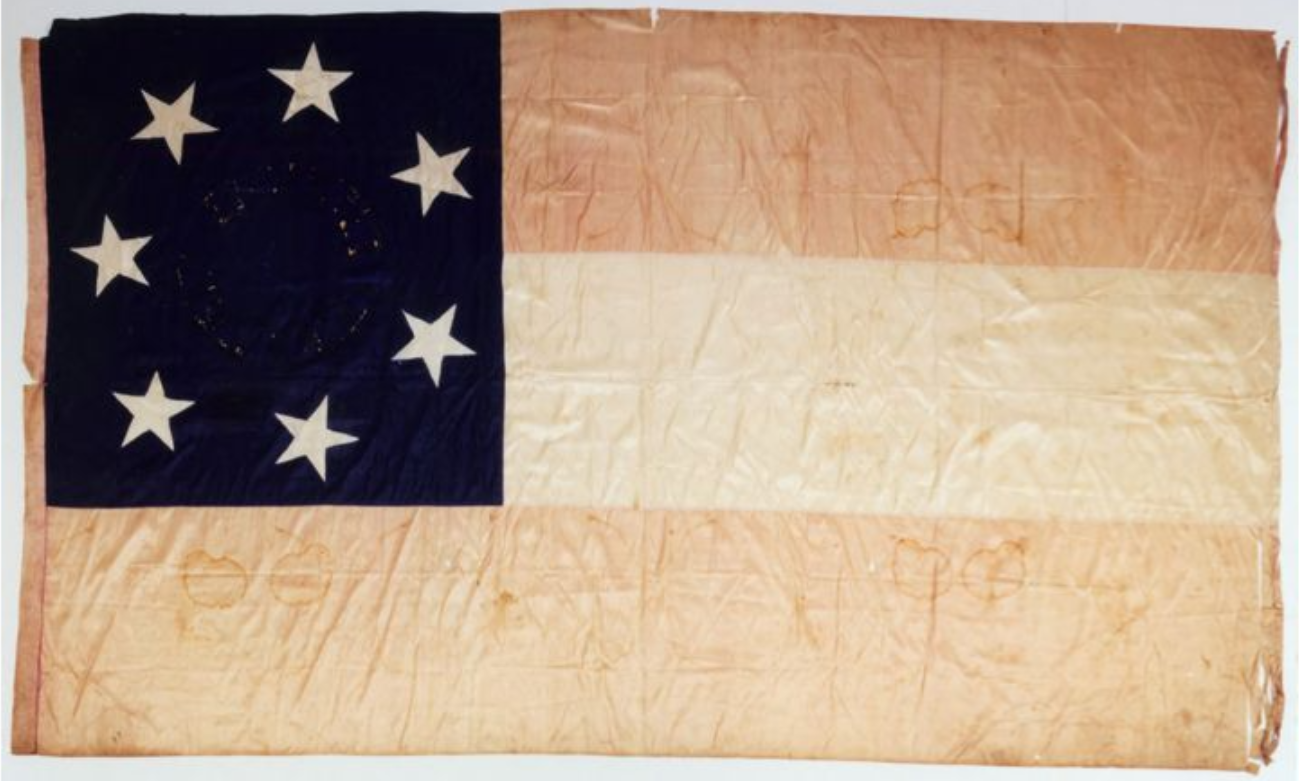
- Flag of the Florence Guards, Company K of the 7th Alabama
- Active: May 1861 – April 1862
- Country: Confederate States of America
- Allegiance: Alabama
- Branch: Confederate States Army
- Size: est. 808 (May 1861)
- Engagements: Battle of Santa Rosa Island; East Tennessee bridge burnings

Commanders
- Notable commanders: S. A. M. Wood; John G. Coltart

The 7th Alabama Infantry Regiment was a Confederate volunteer infantry regiment from Alabama during the American Civil War.

The regiment was formed at Pensacola in May 1861 shortly after the American Civil War began, enlisting for a year of service. The regiment served at Pensacola for the next several months, with several companies engaged in the Battle of Santa Rosa Island. The regiment was sent to fight Unionist guerrillas in response to the East Tennessee bridge burnings in November. Following the suppression of the guerrillas, the 7th Alabama served with the Army of Central Kentucky at Bowling Green. The regiment was disbanded at Corinth when its term of enlistment ended just before the Battle of Shiloh. Due to the unpopularity of their commander, Colonel John G. Coltart, its men refused to continue their service under him, with the majority re-enlisting in other units.

== Organization and Pensacola service ==
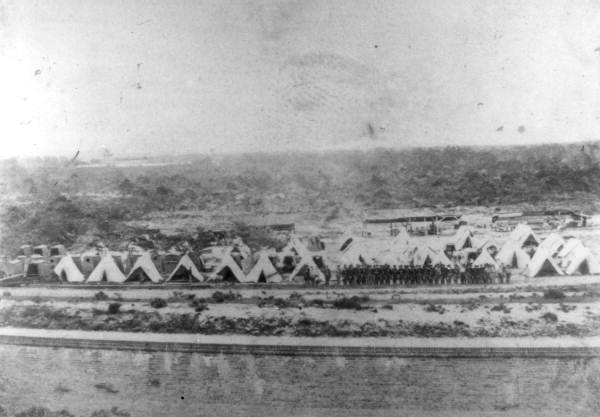
Confederate camp behind Fort Barrancas, April 1861

The regiment was organized on May 18, 1861, at Pensacola from the eight companies of John G. Coltart's 3rd Alabama Battalion, organized on April 12, and two mounted companies, the Wilcox Mounted Rifles and the Prattville Dragoons. S. A. M. Wood, captain of the Florence Guards, was elected colonel, Coltart lieutenant colonel, and Alfred A. Russell major. The companies of the regiment, drawn from across the state, enlisted for twelve months of service and had been sent to Pensacola to participate in the blockade of the Union-held Fort Pickens on Santa Rosa Island. By this time, the Confederate forces at Pensacola had grown to more than 5,000 men under the command of Brigadier General Braxton Bragg. The companies forming Coltart's Battalion had been at Pensacola since at least early April, and the mounted companies had arrived there by early May. The regiment initially had a strength of at least 808, the total number voting in the election of its officers. Wood received a substantial majority in the election for colonel over the Lafayette Guards' Captain James W. Jackson. Like many volunteer regiments, its officers lacked professional military experience: Wood had been a lawyer, Coltart an insurance agent, and Russell a doctor. However, the mounted companies never actually served with the regiment, being detached by Bragg to serve on picket duty along the coast and as his personal escort.

Companies of the 7th Alabama Infantry Regiment
Company	Counties	Captains
A (Lafayette Guards)	Chambers	James W. Jackson (resigned), Simeon Dean
B (Calhoun Grays)	Calhoun	Robert W. Draper
C (Cherokee Grays)	Cherokee	William H. Clare
D (Madison Rifles)	Madison	Oliver B. Gaston
E (Louisville Blues)	Barbour	Patrick Bludworth
F (Dale Guards)	Butler and Pike	William T. McCall
G (Jackson Guards)	Jackson	Flavius J. Graham
H (Wilcox Mounted Rifles)	Wilcox and Dallas	Thomas F. Jenkins
I (Prattville Dragoons)	Montgomery and Autauga	Jesse J. Cox
K (Florence Guards)	Lauderdale	William H. Price

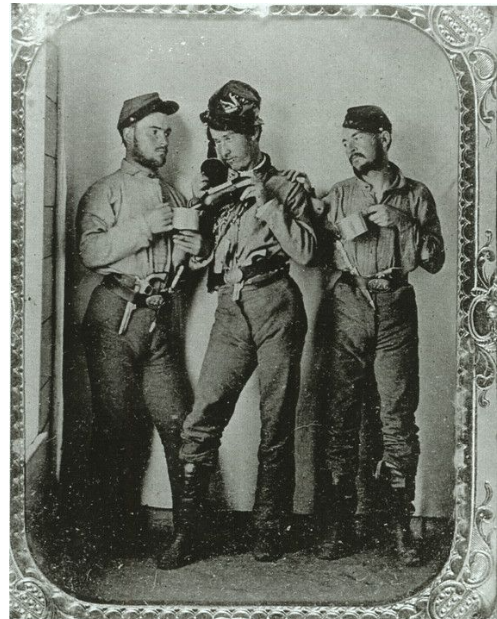
John C. Chitwood, Samuel Brown and James McDaniel of the Florence Guards in a studio photograph at Pensacola

At Pensacola, the regiment settled into a routine of guard duty, drilling and building fortifications with the men finding relaxation in "loafing" around the town. The regiment was quartered in tents behind Fort Barrancas. The troops at Pensacola faced rampant disease that took the lives of many men of the regiment despite attempts at sanitation. John W. James of the Louisville Blues recalled that Wood was often absent, leaving the regiment under Coltart's command. A strict disciplinarian, Coltart became unpopular among the regiment, with James describing him as "wanting in that something which inspires the confidence of men." Among the disciplinary measures were the banning of gambling and the institution of barracks cleaning details. Russell's initial inexperience with drill caused frustration among the men, but he was considered "a fine officer" in the regiment. Dissatisfied with the lack of action, the officers of the 7th Alabama unsuccessfully petitioned a few weeks after the First Battle of Manassas to have the regiment sent to the front in Virginia.

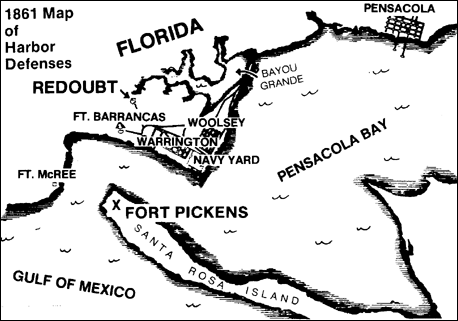
Pensacola Bay fortifications, 1861–1862

Pensacola remained a largely quiet sector while the regiment was there. This was broken when Union raiders burned the privateer Judah at the navy yard before dawn on September 14. In response, Bragg launched a 1,000-man retaliatory sortie against the Union troops on Santa Rosa Island under the command of Brigadier General Richard H. Anderson. The 7th Alabama contributed three companies, the Lafayette Guards, Madison Rifles, and Louisville Blues, to the force, which formed part of Colonel James Patton Anderson's ad-hoc 400-man 2nd Battalion together with units from the 1st Florida Infantry and 1st Louisiana Regulars in the ensuing Battle of Santa Rosa Island. Patton Anderson's battalion landed from a steamer on the night of October 8–9 along with the rest of the force on a beach four miles east of Fort Pickens. Patton Anderson was directed to advance through the waist of the island and then turn west along the south beach. This movement aimed to capture the Union pickets and isolate Fort Pickens from the camp a mile east of the fort where half of the 6th New York Infantry were located.

When a Union picket gave the alarm on the morning of October 9, the 6th New York was alerted, but their camp was captured by John K. Jackson's troops as its occupants hastily departed. After Patton Anderson's troops killed or drove away the pickets opposing them, they joined the rest of the force in looting the camp. With the element of surprise lost and dawn approaching, Richard Anderson ordered a retreat. The Confederates were able to halt the Union troops responding from Fort Pickens and burned the camp before boarding the steamer back to Pensacola. Their departure delayed by a jammed propeller on the ship, they were subjected to a heavy fire from their pursuers before the steamer finally cast off. The 7th Alabama lost at least one killed, two wounded, and six missing, two of which were captured by Company C of the 3rd U. S. Infantry. James recalled that those captured had failed to heed the order to retreat from the camp.

== Tennessee, Kentucky and disbandment ==
As the weather turned colder, the men of the regiment began building winter quarters in late October. Meanwhile, in November the East Tennessee Unionists started a guerrilla war against the Confederates, burning railway bridges in the region. The 7th Alabama, leaving behind the mounted companies, was sent north on November 11 to assist the Confederate troops already stationed there in suppressing the uprising. The regiment was railed through Montgomery and West Point, their arrival at Chattanooga on November 14 delayed by the burned bridges. In the mountains near Chattanooga, local Confederate commander Brigadier General William Henry Carroll threatened an advance on a Unionist camp, forcing them to disperse. The 7th Alabama was transported the Tennessee River by steamboat and reached the deserted camp on November 15. The Cherokee Grays and Dale Guards were sent to capture Unionist leader William D. Clift at his home but were unsuccessful, settling for looting the residence. The regiment captured several Unionists before camping outside of Chattanooga at Tyners Station, from which Wood dispatched scouting parties to arrest suspected Unionists. Many of the latter were released upon taking the oath of allegiance to the Confederacy, and the Carroll considered the uprising suppressed by late December when he lifted martial law in the region. In his report to Bragg, Wood took credit for Carroll's dispersion of the Unionist camp and denounced him as a "stupid, but easily controlled" alcoholic.

To day nine months ago our company left home for the seat of war at Pensacola Fla. And after nine months of service we find our selves at Bowling Green Kentucky in front of the enemy as has been our lot ever since we entered the service we have been in front of the enemy nine months and have never had an opportunity yet to show our country what we could do. The fourth Ala Regt has not been in service as long as we have yet upon the glory field of Manassas immortalized its self while the 7th has been laboring and toiling in the sands of Floriday suffering with disease and death but yet we get no praise only for gentlemany conduct towards the inhabitants of that part of the country through which we have traveled...it seems that hard luck will be our portion the ballance of our time..but yet I do not despair of having an opportunity of meeting the enemy in the battle field before our time is entirely out.

— Diary of Private James P. Stephens, 25 December 1861

While the regiment was at Tyners Station, Bragg issued a general order calling out its company commanders for abandoning their sick in camp when they left for Chattanooga. Private James P. Stephens of the Cherokee Grays wrote in his diary on December 4 that the men of the regiment were dissatisfied at an order from Coltart that forbade them from going out for wood and water without being accompanied by a sergeant and limiting the number of men who could be out of the lines. Stephens wrote that the Madison Rifles, Coltart's old company, were in a state of mutiny, but the situation had resolved itself by the next day. Alcohol created difficulties in the unit, with Russell striking the regimental drum major for being caught with a whiskey bottle and a civilian publicly whipped for selling whiskey to the soldiers. During this period, companies of the regiment were dispatched to Georgetown and Loudon to guard rail bridges. This duty met with resentment, with one soldier of the regiment complaining to his hometown newspaper that guarding rail bridges was a task for militiamen and that the regiment had departed Pensacola just before the action they had sought in the Union bombardment of Fort McRee.

With the Unionist revolt dying down, the 7th Alabama departed Chattanooga by train on December 16 to join the Confederate Army of Central Kentucky at Bowling Green. During this period, men of the regiment were detailed to build fortifications around Bowling Green. Wood was promoted in January to command a temporary brigade in Hardee's Division that included the regiment. Coltart was promoted to colonel and Russell to lieutenant colonel on February 5, with the position of major being left vacant as the end of the regiment's term of service approached. After the fall of Fort Donelson on February 16, the Tennessee River was opened up for a Union advance against the critical rail junction of the Memphis and Charleston and the Mobile and Ohio Railroads at Corinth, Mississippi. Confederate army commander Albert Sidney Johnston abandoned Bowling Green and retreated to Nashville. The 7th Alabama was among the rear guard of the army and protected the evacuation of cannon from Fort Zollicoffer at Nashville. The regiment camped at Murfreesboro on February 23 and retreated further with the army until reaching Corinth where the Confederate armies in the west united in March.

In the final days of March, the service terms of the companies of the regiment began to expire. A majority of the companies refused to continue serving under Coltart. Bragg wrote to Coltart that he regretted having to part with the 7th Alabama but hoped to see them in service again. Addressing the unit, Coltart blamed officers who argued that their men would not re-enlist under Coltart's command. Coltart claimed that "the truth is it is yourselves that want office and are afraid that you will not get it." Attempts were made to get the regiment to re-enlist as a unit, with Wood offering a fifty dollar bounty and thirty days of leave to those who would re-enlist for two years. He also promised them that they would be armed with Enfield rifles. Despite these incentives, there was little support for re-enlisting as a unit among the men and they were accordingly mustered out, handing over their muskets to other units. The regiment was fully disbanded by the first week of April 1862, just before the Battle of Shiloh. Most of its men promptly re-enlisted in other units, including some from Company B in Company K of the 48th Alabama in May 1862 and some from Company E in Company H of the 39th Alabama and Company B of the 4th Alabama Battalion. Wood commanded a brigade and Coltart the newly organized 26th Alabama at the Battle of Shiloh. The two mounted companies formed part of Thomas F. Jenkins' cavalry battalion at Shiloh.
