= Willie Wood (disambiguation) =

Willie Wood (1936–2020) was an American football player and coach.

Willie Wood may also refer to:

- Willie Wood (footballer) (1878–1947), English footballer
- Willie Wood (bowls) (born 1938), Scottish bowls player
- Willie Wood (golfer) (born 1960), American golfer

== See also ==
- Willie Woods (1898–1927), American baseball player
- Will Wood (born 1993), American musician, singer-songwriter, and comedian
- Will Wood (footballer) (born 1996), English footballer
- William Wood (disambiguation)
