= Attorney General Woods =

Attorney General Woods may refer to:

- Cyrus Woods (1861–1938), Attorney General of Pennsylvania
- Grant Woods (born 1954), Attorney General of Arizona

== See also ==
- John Wood (Australian politician) (1829–1914), Attorney General of Victoria
- General Woods (disambiguation)
