= Arthur Gingell =

British wrestler (1883–1947)

Olympic medal record

Men's freestyle wrestling

Representing Great Britain

Olympic Games
Bronze medal – third place	1908 London	Lightweight

Arthur Gingell (30 September 1883 – 20 February 1947) was a British wrestler who competed in the 1908 Summer Olympics. In 1908, at the 1908 Summer Olympics, he won the bronze medal in the freestyle wrestling lightweight class.
