= Prattville Dragoons =

Confederate company

The George L. Smith Cottage, (now the Prattaugian Museum.)

The Prattville Dragoons were a company of men from the city of Prattville, and Autauga County, Alabama, organized for Confederate service during the American Civil War of 1861-1865.

== Formation ==
A re-creation of the 1861 Prattville Dragoon Silk Flag.

The Prattville Dragoons were the first Company of men from the city of Prattville, and Autauga County, Alabama, to form for service in the impending American Civil War of 1861-1865. The idea for forming a Company was originally suggested by Samuel D. Oliver, from nearby Robinson Springs, Alabama. The Company organized on December 8, 1860 in the west front parlor of the home of George L. Smith (now the Prattaugan Museum.), The Company was formed as a part of the "Alabama Volunteer Corps" and in her book Hon. Daniel Pratt, Mrs. S.F.H. Tarrant states that "... Mr. Pratt presented to every member of this cavalry company a uniform, made of black broadcloth, trimmed with gold braid. No other company in the State had a uniform so handsome."

In his book War History of the Prattville Dragoons Captain W.F. Mims (the last Commander of Co. H, 3rd Ala. Cav., CSA) spoke fondly of Pratt's generosity, stating, "Many not being able to furnish their mounts were greatly discouraged. That great and good man, Daniel Pratt, so well known for deeds of charity and generosity, supplied the defeiciency at a cost of many hundred dollars." (Quoting Historian Tommy Brown of the Continental / Eagle Manufacturing Company - still producing cotton gins in Daniel Pratt's buildings - "Daniel Pratt was Alabama's first millionaire.") The rank of "Captain" was voted by the members of the Unit, and the first Captain of the Prattville Dragoons was Jesse Cox "of Steamboat notoriety" from Mobile, Alabama. In total, there was originally "18 commissioned and non-commissioned officers and 82 privates, total 100, with two faithful colored cooks." The soldiers formed for their send-off at the school yard of the Prattville Academy and was presented a beautiful silk flag that was sewn by hand by the young ladies of Prattville. On Confederate Memorial Day in 1916, a large boulder with a bronze plaque was placed on that site to honor the Dragoons by the United Daughters of the Confederacy.

The Pratville Dragoon March.

== Combat history ==
UDC plaque on large boulder

The Prattville Dragoons rode first to the Fair Grounds in Montgomery, Alabama, and then partially by train, and partially by horseback to Pensacola, Florida, to the Camp of Instruction there being led by General Braxton Bragg. The majority of the Prattville Dragoons brought their personal civilian and hunting firearms with them, but those lacking arms were issued Colt 1851 Navy Revolvers and sabers. While in Pensacola, the Prattville Dragoons were first assigned as the "mounted" Company "I" of the 7th Alabama Infantry. They left Pensacola in February 1862 traveling light and suffered through snow, sleet and rain in Chattanooga, Tennessee, that March. They marched further and participated in the Battle of Shiloh in April 1862. When their initial term of enlistment expired, the Unit en masse reenlisted and was accepted as Company "H" of the 3rd Alabama Cavalry in Tupelo, Mississippi, in June 1862. Captain Cox returned to the steamboat business, and Wilbur Fisk Mims was voted into the Captain position. As a Company of the Third Alabama Cavalry, the Prattville Dragoons accompanied the Confederate Army of Tennessee into Kentucky and were engaged in daily conflicts with the enemy, particularly at Bramlet's Station and the Battle of Perryville. It fell back with the army, and was on constant and arduous duty during the remainder of the war, protecting its communications, guarding its rear and flanks, and often raiding upon the enemy's trains and outposts. The whole regiment was a part of the brigade composed of the First, Third, Fourth, Ninth, Twelfth, and Fifty-First Alabama Cavalry, commanded first by Gen. Allen of Montgomery, then subsequently by Gen. Hagan of Mobile.

UDC marker for Prattville Dragoons

The Third Alabama cavalry was engaged at Stones River; Shelbyville; Chickamauga; Kingston; Knoxville; Mossy Creek; Strawberry Plains; ... losing continuously in casualties, and suffering severely during General James Longstreet's winter campaign. As the 3rd and her Company's fought in Dalton and Atlanta it performed arduous service, fighting with severe loss at Decatur, and helping to capture General Stoneman's column. In front of General William T. Sherman, the regiment shrouded General Hood's movements, then harassed the former on his march, participating in the fights near Macon; at Winchester; Aiken; Fayetteville, Monroe's Crossroads (where Confederate and Union troops engaged in the last cavalry battle of the Civil War); the Bentonville; Raleigh and Chapel Hill. Reduced by its losses to a skeleton, the regiment was surrendered in North Carolina as a part of General Joseph E. Johnston's surrender on April 26, 1865. The Prattville Dragoons encamped to await Union parole, but after remaining dormant for several days without any sign of Union Officers to officially parole them, the Unit disbanded and returned to their homes.

== See also ==
- List of Confederate units from Alabama
