= General Woods =

General Woods may refer to:

- Charles R. Woods (1827–1885), Union Army brigadier general and brevet major general
- Henry Woods (British Army officer) (1924–2019), British Army major general
- Louis E. Woods (1895–1971), U.S. Marine Corps lieutenant general
- William Burnham Woods (1824–1887), Union Army brigadier general and brevet major general

== See also ==
- General Wood (disambiguation)
- Attorney General Woods (disambiguation)
