= St James's Church, Clerkenwell =

Church in the London Borough of Islington

Coordinates: 51.5236°N 0.1056°W

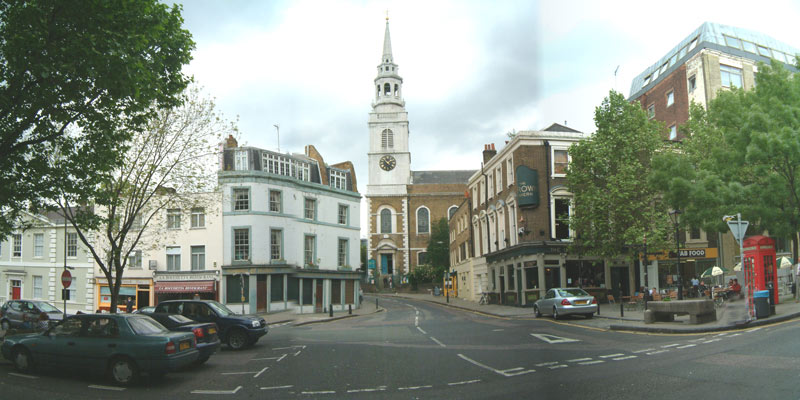
St James's Church and Clerkenwell Green

St James Church, Clerkenwell is an Anglican parish church in Clerkenwell, London, England.

== History ==
=== Nunnery of St Mary: c. 1100–1539 ===
The parish of St James, Clerkenwell, has had a long and sometimes lively history. The springs which give Clerkenwell its name are mentioned during the reign of Henry II. The parish clerks of London used to perform their mystery plays, plays based on Biblical themes, in the neighbourhood, sometimes in the presence of royalty. In approximately 1100 a Norman baron named Jordan Briset founded an Augustine nunnery dedicated to St Mary, which became wealthy and influential. It had a place of pilgrimage at Muswell Hill, and the parish kept an outlying tract of territory there until the nineteenth century.

=== Old Church of St James: 1540–1788 ===
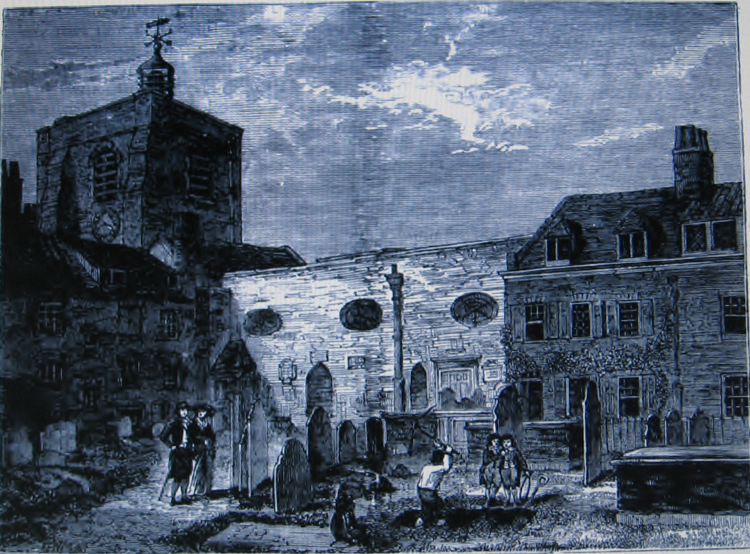
The old church of St James, Clerkenwell

At the dissolution of the nunnery under Henry VIII its church, which by then seems to have acquired a second dedication to St James, was taken into use by its parishioners who had already been using a part of it for some considerable time. The site of the nunnery was granted to Thomas Howard, 3rd Duke of Norfolk, in 1540 but the freehold of the church passed through various hands until it was conveyed in 1656 to trustees on behalf of the parishioners, who at the same time obtained the right to appoint the vicar. Unlike other parishes, they retained it after the Restoration of 1660. Elections of vicars were held, with all the excitement and paraphernalia of parliamentary elections, right down to the early years of the twentieth century, and a distinctly Low Church tradition was thereby established. This did not prevent a long struggle in the latter years of the eighteenth century with Selina, Countess of Huntingdon. This strong-minded and evangelical lady had taken over a building in the parish called Spa Fields Chapel, and insisted on appointing her own chaplains to preach there. The vicar was furious, and his action against her in the ecclesiastical courts was the cause of her secession from the Church of England.

In 1596, the playwright George Peele was buried in the church.

In 1623 the steeple fell down twice but was eventually successfully rebuilt. Pocahontas and John Rolfe's son, Thomas Rolfe, married Elizabeth Washington here in September 1632. They had a daughter named Anne a year later. Elizabeth died shortly after Anne's birth. Two years later, he returned to Jamestown, Virginia, leaving his daughter with his cousin, Anthony Rolfe.

It is believed that, in 1632, the playwright Thomas Dekker was buried in the church.

In 1641, the playwright Thomas Heywood was buried in the church.

In 1737, Matthew King, accomplice of Dick Turpin, was buried at St James, aged 25, after he was allegedly accidentally shot by Turpin during a robbery.

=== New Church of St James: 1792–present ===
The new church of St James, Clerkenwell, 1806

Clerkenwell Church Act 1788
- Act of Parliament
- Parliament of Great Britain
- Long title: An Act for pulling down the Church of Saint James at Clerkenwell in the County of Middlesex, and for building a new Church; and making a new Church Yard or Cemetery in the said Parish, with convenient Avenues and Passages thereto.
- Citation: 28 Geo. 3. c. 10
- Territorial extent: Great Britain

Dates
- Royal assent: 20 March 1788
- Commencement: 27 November 1787 (Note: Start of session.)

Status: Current legislation

Text of statute as originally enacted

By 1788 the old church, which was a medley of seventeenth and eighteenth century sections in various styles grafted onto the remains of the mediaeval nunnery church, presented an appearance of picturesque and dilapidated muddle. In that year an act of Parliament (28 Geo. 3. c. 10) was passed for the rebuilding of the church, the money to be provided by the sale of annuities. The architect was a local man, James Carr, and he produced a building which is pre-eminently a preaching-house but with carefully planned and harmonious detail clearly influenced by Wren and Gibbs. The new church was dedicated by Bishop Beilby Porteus in 1792. The upper galleries were added in 1822 for the children of the Sunday-School, founded in 1807 and still flourishing; the back parts of the upper galleries were for the use of the poor. The tower and spire were restored in 1849 by William Pettit Griffith, and Sir Arthur Blomfield restored the church and rearranged the ground floor in 1882; both works were done very well. Inside, a noteworthy feature is the curved acoustic wall at the west end. The wall at the east end originally had painted panels in the Venetian window frame; the stained glass in the east windows is by Heaton, Butler and Bayne, 1863.

The organ was built in 1792 by George Pike England to replace the one by Richard Bridge, which he took in part exchange. The new organ had three manuals, toe pedals and a Spanish mahogany case. This, together with much of England's pipe work, still survives. The rococo detail is noteworthy, especially the carved drapery over the pipes. The organ was rebuilt by Noel Mander of Mander Organs in 1978, returning to the original style after some drastic alterations made in 1928. It now has 2 manuals and pedals and 22 speaking stops.

There is a fine peal of eight bells in the tower, dating from 1791, though all the bells were recast in 1928.

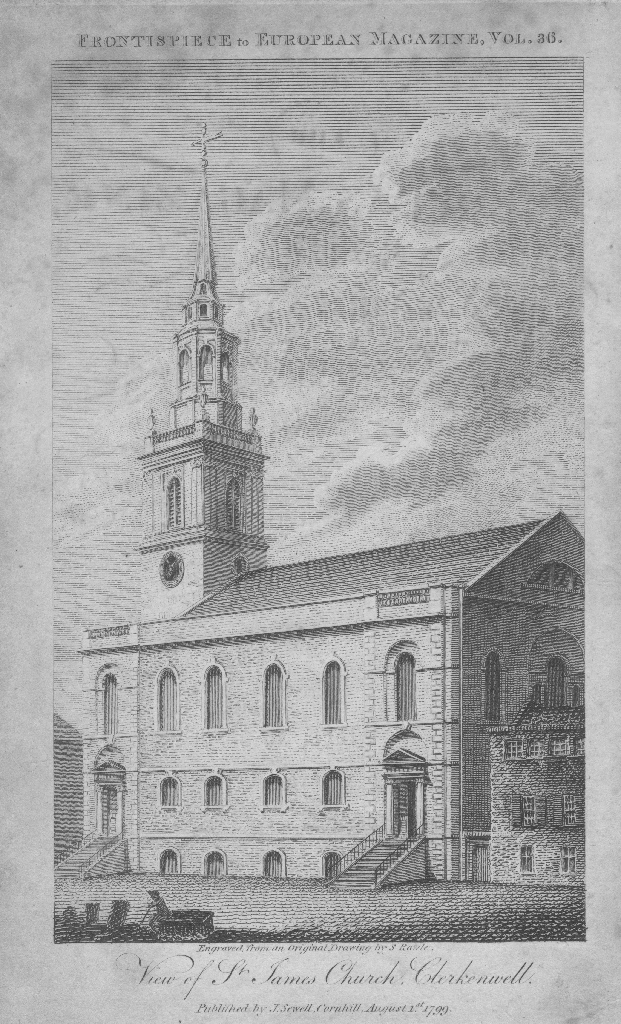
Frontispiece of The European Magazine, vol. 36, 1 August 1799

A print of the church, based on a drawing by Samuel Rawle, featured as the frontispiece of The European Magazine, volume 36, published 1 August 1799.

During the nineteenth century, the Rev. Robert Maguire served as vicar, engaging in extensive publication of Protestant pamphlets and participating in a contentious election. His tenure included structural repairs to the church building and alterations to the interior layout.

The crypt was used for burials, but early in the twentieth century 300 coffins were moved and stored under the main West entrance. The crypt was then excavated and equipped to form a large hall. The new hall was opened by the Princess Marie Louise of Schleswig-Holstein in 1912. It was later remodelled and opened by the Rt Revd Richard Chartres, Bishop of Stepney, on 18 June 1994. The latest work created a dedicated youth space in part of the crypt and was opened by Rt Rev John Sentamu, Bishop of Stepney, on 19 December 1999.

During the 20th century, the parish of St John, which had been carved out of St James's in 1721, was reunited with it, as was the parish of St Peter. The latter had been established in 1869 for the Smithfield Martyrs Memorial Church of that name; the present church contains a memorial to the Martyrs as a commemoration of St Peter's, which suffered heavy war damage in 1941 and was finally demolished in 1955. The parish church of St John was a remnant of the priory of St John, which is now the headquarters of the Order of the Hospital of St John of Jerusalem, and the church became the chapel of the Order.

In 1998 the Rev Andrew Baughen - son of the retired Anglican bishop, Michael Baughen - became vicar, and remained at St James until 2018.

== Historical features ==
The current church retains many reminders of its past.

- The communion table and communion rail are part of the original furnishings. Both are curved toward the west. The table is of mahogany, inlaid with box wood, decorated with plumes of feathers and a dove – the emblem of the Holy Spirit.
- A wooden figure of St James which stood over the poor box in the former church is now over the west door of the Nave.
- There are several monuments from the old church. These were neglected at the rebuilding, but during the nineteenth century were rescued by the church wardens and set up in the church and porch.
  - In the church are the following:
    - A wall tablet to William Wood, a noted archer who died in 1691 and whose memorial at the end of the south aisle was restored by the Toxophilite Society in 1791.
    - A large wall tablet with armorials to Elizabeth, Countess Dowager of Exeter, at the east end of the south aisle, it records her illustrious lineage and the brilliant marriages she made for her three daughters. Next to her lies Mico Wagstaff, ironmonger.
    - A sixteenth-century brass to John Bell, Bishop of Worcester, 1539–43, who lived in retirement in Clerkenwell and was buried in the old church in 1556.
  - Among the memorials in the porch are those to:
    - Gilbert Burnet, Bishop of Salisbury, and a well-known preacher and writer, who died in 1714 at his daughter's house in the parish; there is a floor slab to him under the communion table. The wall tablet was executed by Robert Hartshorne, to a design by Edward Stanton.
    - Henry Penton, who died in 1714: his grandson of the same name developed the area now known as Pentonville.
    - Thomas Crosse and his wife, 1712, a sculpture by Roubiliac.
- The porch also houses the benefaction boards, recording the numerous charities still being distributed among the elderly folk of Clerkenwell and going back to the reign of Elizabeth I, when the parish was a fashionable place to live.
- Over the west door are the royal arms of George III. Made of Coade stone and dated 1792, they were formerly over the reredos.
- The church contains a memorial to the victims of the "Fenian Conspiracy", an escape plot from the nearby Clerkenwell Prison which killed 12 and injured 120.
- The church contains a modern memorial to 66 martyrs, from 1400 to 1558, of the Smithfield Fires in a blocked-up doorway that is referred to as the Martyrs Door.

== Present day ==
The Rev. Mark Jackson and the Rev. Pete Nicholas were licensed by the Bishop of Stepney to Saint James Clerkenwell in 2018. The Bishop's Mission Order initiative ‘Inspire London’ that the two had initiated in 2013 was combined with Saint James Clerkenwell to form the church in its current form Inspire Saint James Clerkenwell. The Rev. Mark Jackson was licensed as incumbent in December 2022.

== The Crypt ==
The Crypt underneath the Church was converted to be a usable space in 1912 and is split into a main room, a side room and a kitchen. The main room, The Crypt, has a vaulted brick ceiling and parquet flooring and is used by the church itself and the local community.

Because of its magnificent architecture and location in the heart of London the crypt is a popular venue for exhibitions, film shoots, parties, conferences and wedding receptions. It has been used as a filming location for several different productions including an episode of the BBC's Songs of Praise featuring the London Community Gospel Choir, Katie Melua's video for the song "Two Bare Feet”, the 2002 film About A Boy, the 2018 film Holmes & Watson, and Black Earth Rising.
