= Wrestling at the 1908 Summer Olympics – Men's freestyle lightweight =

1908 olympics event

Men's lightweight freestyle wrestling at the Games of the IV Olympiad
- Venue: White City Stadium
- Date: July 24
- Competitors: 11 from 2 nations

Medalists
1st place, gold medalist(s)		George de Relwyskow	Great Britain
2nd place, silver medalist(s)		William Wood	Great Britain
3rd place, bronze medalist(s)		Arthur Gingell	Great Britain

The freestyle lightweight was one of five freestyle wrestling weight classes contested on the Wrestling at the 1908 Summer Olympics programme. Like all other wrestling events, it was open only to men. The lightweight was the median weight class, allowing wrestlers of up to 66.6 kilograms (147 lb). Each nation could enter up to 12 wrestlers.

== Competition format ==
The event was a single-elimination tournament with a bronze medal match between the semifinal losers. The final and bronze medal match were best two-of-three, while all other rounds were a single bout. Bouts were 15 minutes, unless one wrestler lost by fall (two shoulders on the ground at the same time). Other than falls, decisions were made by the judges or, if they did not agree, the referee.

Wrestlers could "take hold how and where they please[d]" except that "hair, flesh, ears, private parts, or clothes may not be seized"; striking, scratching, twisting fingers, butting, and kicking were prohibited. Holds "obtained that the fear of breakage or dislocation of a limb shall induce a wrestler to give the fall" were outlawed, and particularly the double-nelson, hammerlock, strangle, half-strangle, scissors, hang, flying mare with palm uppermost, and the foot twist.

== Results ==
=== Standings ===
Place	Wrestler	Nation
1	George de Relwyskow	Great Britain
2	William Wood	Great Britain
3	Arthur Gingell	Great Britain
4	George MacKenzie	Great Britain
5	Harry Baillie	Great Britain
5	John Krug	United States of America
5	John McKenzie	Great Britain
5	William Shepherd	Great Britain
9	George Faulkner	Great Britain
9	William Henson	Great Britain
9	John Hoy	Great Britain

=== Bracket ===
First Round
Decision
John Krug (USA)
John Hoy (GBR)
Decision
William Wood (GBR)
George Faulkner (GBR)
Fall (6:04)
George de Relwyskow (GBR)
William Henson (GBR)

Quarter-finals
Fall (6:08)
John Krug (USA)
William Wood (GBR)
Fall (6:20)
George McKenzie (GBR)
John McKenzie (GBR)
Decision
George de Relwyskow (GBR)
William Shepherd (GBR)
Fall (10:24)
Arthur Gingell (GBR)
Harry Baillie (GBR)

Semi-finals
Fall (7:44)
William Wood (GBR)
George McKenzie (GBR)
Fall (14:41)
George de Relwyskow (GBR)
Arthur Gingell (GBR)

Final
2–0 (decision/decision)
William Wood (GBR) (silver)
George de Relwyskow (GBR) (gold)
Third place
2–0 (falls 6:44/3:20)
Arthur Gingell (GBR) (bronze)
George McKenzie (GBR)

== Sources ==
- Cook, Theodore Andrea (1908). The Fourth Olympiad, Being the Official Report. London: British Olympic Association.
- De Wael, Herman (2001). "Freestyle Wrestling 1908". Herman's Full Olympians.
