= Bill Wood (footballer, born 1927) =

English footballer

Personal information
- Full name: William Wood
- Date of birth: 28 December 1927
- Place of birth: Barnsley, England
- Date of death: July 2010 (aged 82)
- Place of death: South Tyneside, England
- Position: Full-back

Youth career
- 1947–1948: Spen Juniors

Senior career*
Years	Team	Apps	(Gls)
1948–1951	Sunderland	1	(0)
1951–1952	Hull City	0	(0)
1952–1953	Sheffield United	5	(0)
1953–195?	Wisbech Town		
- * Club domestic league appearances and goals

William Wood (28 December 1927 – July 2010) was an English professional footballer who played as a full-back for Sunderland.
