= William Wood (naturalist) =

American physician and ornithologist

Dr. William Wood
- Born: July 7, 1822; Waterbury, Connecticut, US
- Died: September 9, 1885 (aged 63); South Windsor, Connecticut, US
- Education: University Medical College of New York
- Occupation: Physician
- Known for: Scientific and popular writings in ornithology; accumulating one of the largest private bird specimen collections in the United States

William Wood (July 7, 1822 – August 9, 1885) was an American medical doctor and naturalist, best remembered as an expert on the avifauna of Connecticut.

== Education and career ==
Wood was born in Waterbury, Connecticut on July 7, 1822, to Rev. Luke Wood (1777–1851) and Anna (Pease) Wood (1780–1859). He was one of eleven children.

Wood completed his early education in Old Killingsworth (today Clinton), Connecticut. He was accepted at Yale University but disqualified from enrolling on account of poor eyesight. At age 17, Wood became a teacher at the East Windsor Hill Academy, a preparatory school in the East Windsor Hill neighborhood of South Windsor, Connecticut. In the following years, Wood took courses at the Berkshire Medical College and graduated from the University Medical College of New York in 1847.

After medical school, Wood moved back to East Windsor Hill, where he lived for the remainder of his life. Wood was a practicing physician in the Windsor area for almost four decades and medical examiner for South Windsor. He founded the Hartford County North Medical Association, was secretary of the Hartford Medical Society, and was a member of the Connecticut Medical Society and the American Medical Association. Wood published on medical treatments.

== Natural history ==
Wood was an active field ornithologist and a "leading authority" on New England birds. He published in the American Naturalist, Ornithologist and Oologist, Bulletin of the Nuttall Ornithological Club, Familiar Science and Fancier's Journal, and wrote a series of 21 popular articles about New England birds for the Hartford Times in 1861, as well additional articles in later years. Wood specialized in raptor research and made numerous contributions in this area, including more accurately describing the ranges and clutch sizes of several species.

Wood acquired a significant collection of bird specimens and eggs from the United States and abroad, including specimens of several state-first birds for Connecticut.

In addition, Wood wrote about the fish of New England and was an active botanist, sending specimens to several research institutions.

Wood was a member of the Nuttall Ornithological Club, the Lyceum of Natural History at Williams College, and the Essex Institute. Wood's correspondents included George A. Boardman and Spencer F. Baird, to whom Wood gave two Peregrine Falcons in 1862.

== Other activities ==
Wood had an interest in archaeology, collecting Native American artifacts in South Windsor. He also wrote a history of steam navigation, emphasizing the contributions of John Fitch of South Windsor. Wood originally published his history in the Hartford Times and Locomotive in 1881. In 1887, the Connecticut General Assembly ordered that it be preserved in the State Archives (under "A Resolution providing for a Tablet to the Memory of John Fitch of Windsor"). Wood was a member of the First Congregational Church.

== Family ==
Wood married Mary Lyman Ellsworth on November 9, 1848. They had two children, Elizabeth Ellsworth (Wood) Sperry and William Russell Wood.

== Death and legacy ==
Wood died in East Windsor Hill on August 9, 1885, after an illness lasting three days.

The Hartford Scientific Society acquired Wood's specimen collection in 1896 and deposited it in the Wadsworth Antheneum, where John Hall Sage curated it. Wood's specimens moved to Trinity College on loan from the Wadsworth in 1946. The University of Connecticut now holds Wood's collection.

Merriam referenced Wood's correspondence and specimens extensively in A Review of the Birds of Connecticut (1877). Later reviews of New England birds also draw on Wood's records.

The Smithsonian holds Wood's collection of Native American artifacts.

The Wood Memorial Library, South Windsor's public library from 1927 to 1968, was dedicated to Dr. William Wood and Mary Ellsworth Wood. It is now an independent research library and museum, which includes natural history collections in Dr. Wood's honor.
