= William Wood (toxophilite) =

English toxophilite

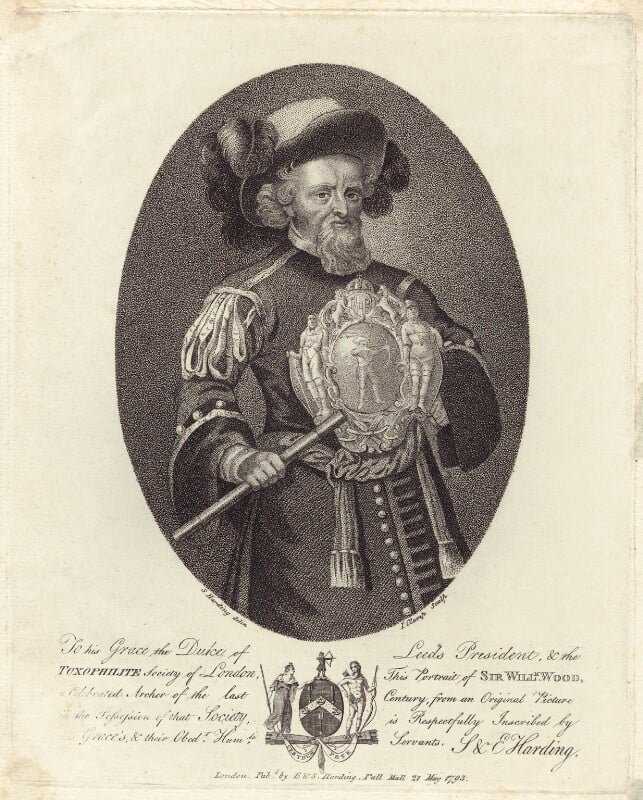
- Born: 1609
- Died: 4 September 1691 (aged 81–82)
- Occupation: Toxophilite

Sir William Wood (1609 – 4 September 1691) was an English toxophilite.

== Biography ==
Wood was born in 1609. He was for many years marshal of the Finsbury archers, who held their meetings in Finsbury Fields. He was probably knighted by Charles II for his skill in the use of the bow. In 1676 his society or regiment purchased a badge or shield to be worn by their marshal, and the decoration, known as the "Catherine of Braganza Shield," passed to successive marshals till 1736, when the office was abolished. Subsequently each succeeding captain of the Easter target held it till it passed into the hands of the Royal Toxophilite Society on its formation in 1781. This society also absorbed the few remaining Finsbury archers.

Wood died on 4 September 1691, and was buried at St. James's, Clerkenwell, on 10 September with archer's honours, three flights of whistling arrows being discharged over his grave by the regiment. A stone, with epitaph in verse (given in John Stow's "Survey of London and Westminster," ed. Strype, iv. 67), was placed on the outside of the south wall of the church of St. James's, Clerkenwell, which on the rebuilding in 1791 was removed to the interior at the expense of the Royal Toxophilite Society.

Two portraits of Wood are in the possession of this society. They were originally decorations of the inner sides of the doors of a case made for the preservation of the Catherine of Braganza shield. One was engraved and published in 1793 (cf. Biographical Mirrour, London, 1793).

Wood was the author of a work on archery, entitled "The Bowman's Glory, or Archery revived" (London, 1682, 1691). It was dedicated to Charles II. The second part, entitled "A Remembrance of the Worthy Show and Shooting of the Duke of Shoreditch," was reprinted at the end of Thomas Roberts's "English Bowman" (London, 1801). In some copies of Wood's book a portrait was subsequently inserted by booksellers. None appeared in the original issue.
