= Matthew David Keirans =

American identity thief (born 1966)

- Born: 1966 (age 59–60); California, U.S.
- Occupation: IT worker (under stolen identity)
- Employer(s): University of Iowa Hospitals and Clinics (fraudulently, 2013–2023)
- Known for: Decades-long identity theft of William Woods
- Status: Incarcerated
- Motive: Avoid prosecution under his real identity
- Conviction: Guilty plea (April 1, 2024)
- Criminal charges: Identity theft, making false statements
- Penalty: 12 years in federal prison

Details
- Span of crimes: 1988–2023
- Country: United States
- States: New Mexico, Colorado, Oregon, Wisconsin, Iowa, California
- Date apprehended: 2023

Matthew David Keirans (born 1966) is an American criminal who committed a decades-long scheme of identity theft that resulted in the institutionalization and imprisonment of his victim, William Woods. Keirans stole Woods's wallet in the late 1980s. He used it to assume the other man's identity, likely in a bid to escape legal trouble under his real name. Over several decades, Keirans used the false name to take out loans, apply for a marriage license, and obtain employment.

Woods, who often experienced homelessness, tried multiple times to reclaim his identity. Keirans, however, blocked those attempts by convincing authorities that Woods was the imposter. Woods spent five months in a psychiatric hospital, as well as a year in jail, after being wrongly accused of identity theft in 2019.

In 2023, a detective uncovered Keirans's scheme through DNA evidence that exonerated Woods. Keirans pleaded guilty to identity theft, and he was sentenced to 12 years in prison. The case received widespread attention, with some observers referring to it as a Kafkaesque miscarriage of justice.

== Early life and background ==
Keirans was born in 1966. He grew up in California, raised by adoptive parents. At the age of 16 or 17, he ran away from home without graduating from high school. He soon began experiencing legal trouble as he moved around the country, including arrests in California, Kentucky, and New Mexico. One of his encounters with the law involved the alleged theft of a car in San Francisco. Following his arrest for the motor vehicle theft, Keirans skipped a court date and disappeared from law enforcement. Authorities have no record of Keirans using his real name, social security number, or date of birth after 1988.

== Identity theft scheme ==
In the late 1980s, Keirans was living homeless in Albuquerque, New Mexico when he encountered William Woods. Keirans worked alongside Woods, who was also homeless, at a hot dog stand. Woods would later recall the theft of his wallet by Keirans during their time working together. In 1990, Keirans obtained a driver's license in Colorado under Woods's identity. Around this time Keirans was working as a newspaper carrier, while also allegedly committing a string of crimes under Woods's name, including vehicular theft. Keirans's activity with law enforcement soon ceased after he got married and had a child. To help corroborate his false identity, Keirans used Ancestry.com to obtain the birth certificate of Woods. He used the birth certificate, along with the driver's license, to build a new life under Woods's name. Under the false identity, Keirans opened bank accounts; applied for titles, deeds, and loans; and obtained employment. He eventually embarked on a career in IT, becoming a high-level administrator at a hospital system managed by the University of Iowa. He earned over $140,000 a year, while working remotely from his home in Wisconsin.

To maintain his identity, Keirans stymied efforts by Woods to reclaim his identity. Woods, who bounced between jobs and was often homeless, made several unsuccessful attempts to convince authorities that his identity was being stolen. Over the course of several years in the late 2010s, Keirans took out over $200,000 in loans in Wisconsin. During this time, the YouTuber Yousef Saleh Erakat featured Woods discussing his travails in several videos, which garnered over a million views. Woods used money from Erakat to enroll in a credit monitoring service, which alerted him to loans taken out by Keirans. Woods went to a bank in California to try and close the loans, arguing that he did not want to pay the debt which did not belong to him. Representatives from the bank did not believe him, and they contacted the authorities, who in turn, contacted Keirans. Keirans sent the authorities documentation that convinced them that the real Woods was lying. Woods, as a result, was tried in court for identity theft. The judge, according to transcripts, described Woods as "crazy" and ordered him institutionalized. Woods underwent forced psychiatric medication and spent over a year in jail.

== Discovery and conviction ==
Keirans came under the scrutiny of a detective, Ian Mallory, in February 2023. Mallory works for the University of Iowa Police Department, and was initially skeptical of Woods, but only decided to investigate further after Keirans insulted Mallory's abilities as a police officer. Both Keirans and Woods were using the same birth certificate and claiming the same father in Kentucky. This gave Mallory the idea to perform a DNA test. The test showed that Woods, not Keirans, was the victim of identity theft. Keirans confessed to the scheme, telling investigators: "My life is over". On April 1, 2024, Keirans pleaded guilty to identity theft and fraud. He was sentenced to 12 years in prison. Woods was exonerated and has since sought to rebuild his life.

The case attracted attention because of the social implications. Woods, who was often homeless, was not believed; while the middle-class Keirans was subjected to less scrutiny.

== Timeline ==
Date	Event
1988	William Woods and Matthew David Keirans meet while working at a hot dog stand in Albuquerque, New Mexico.
1990	Keirans fraudulently obtains a Colorado state ID card under Woods's name.
2019	Woods, living in Los Angeles, discovers that hundreds of thousands of dollars of debt had been accumulated in his name. He attempts to close the fraudulent accounts, but Keirans falsely reports Woods as the identity thief.
2019 – 2021	Woods is arrested for identity theft and impersonation, spends over 400 days in jail, and is declared incompetent to stand trial. He ultimately pleads no contest and is released with time served.
2023	Woods contacts the University of Iowa Hospitals and Clinics, where Keirans works under Woods's identity. An investigation leads to DNA evidence confirming Woods's true identity.
April 1, 2024	Keirans pleads guilty to identity theft and fraud in federal court.
April 11, 2024	Woods's wrongful conviction is vacated by a Los Angeles County Superior Court judge, and the District Attorney's Office dismisses his case.
