= George de Relwyskow =

English wrestler (1887–1942)

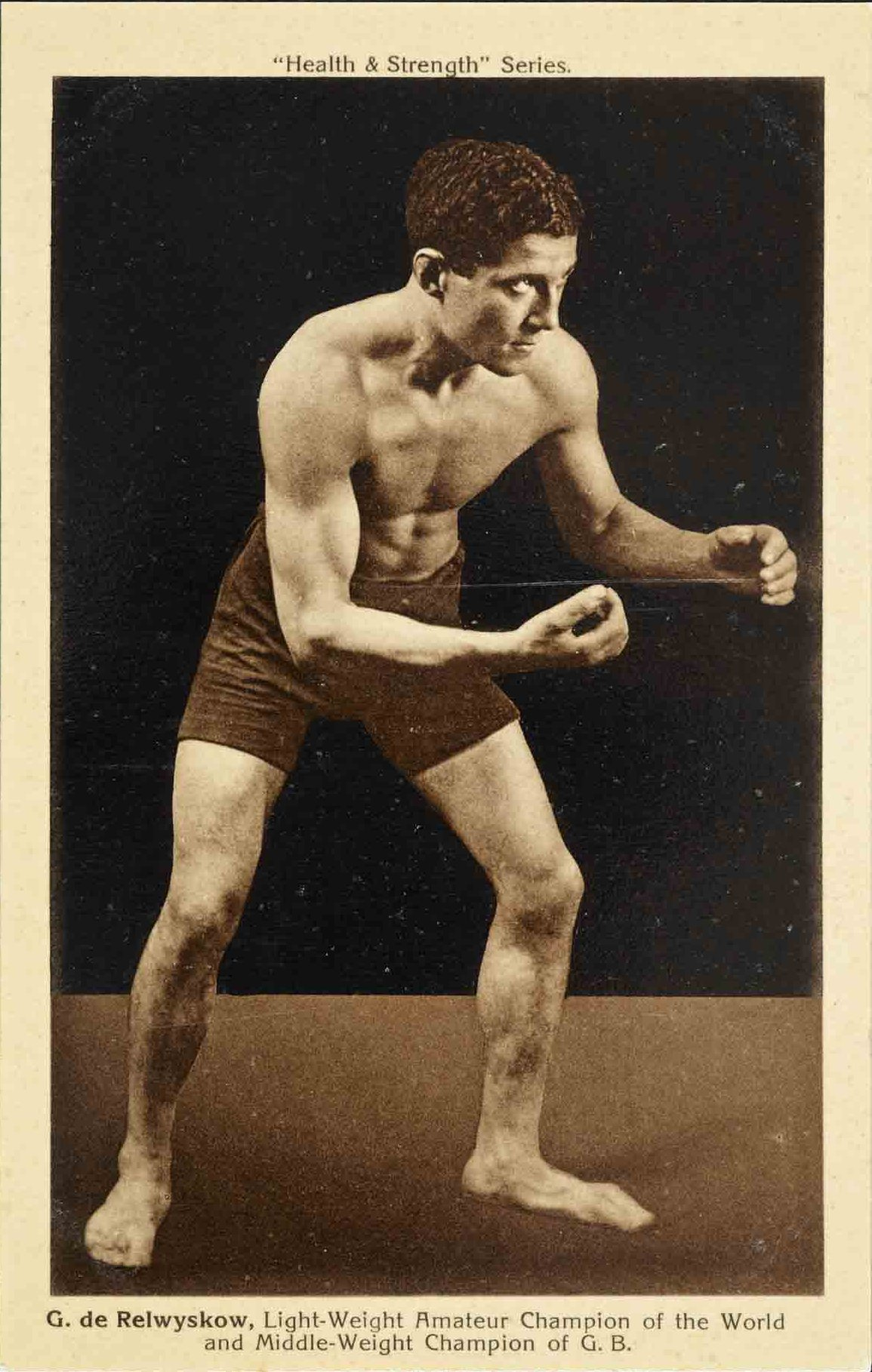
- George de Relwyskow in 1908

Personal information
- Born: 18 June 1887 Kensington, England
- Died: 9 November 1942 (aged 55) Leeds, England
Medal record
Men's freestyle wrestling
Representing Great Britain
Olympic Games
Gold medal – first place	1908 London	Lightweight
Silver medal – second place	1908 London	Middleweight

George Frederick William de Relwyskow (18 June 1887 – 9 November 1942) was an English sport wrestler who competed in the 1908 Summer Olympics for Great Britain.

== Biography ==
Born in Kensington in 1887, the son of immigrants from the Russian Empire, de Relwyskow took up wrestling as a means of keeping fit while a student in London training as an artist and designer. By 1907, he had won thirty-five open competitions in Great Britain and won the amateur championships at lightweight and middleweight at the British Wrestling Championships in 1907 and 1908. Because of his success, he was selected to represent Great Britain in the 1908 Olympics held in London.

On the outbreak of the First World War, de Relwyskow returned to Britain from South America, where he was on a wrestling tour to enlist in the Army. He served as a gymnastic and bayonet-fighting trainer and served for a period with the Australian infantry. In France, he trained soldiers in the use of unarmed combat. In October 1918, de Relwyskow was based at Aldershot as a Royal Army Physical Training Corps instructor in the Army system of wrestling, a system he created. In 1924, he was appointed trainer for the British Olympic Games team in the 1924 Olympics in Paris.

George de Relwyskow was the youngest winner of an Olympic gold medal for wrestling, a record that was to stand for almost seventy years until the 20-year-old Soviet Suren Nalbandyan won the Greco-Roman lightweight title in 1976.

He enlisted again at the start of World War II and served as an instructor in Unarmed Combat and Silent Killing with the Special Operations Executive (SOE). After serving for a period as an instructor at the SOE School in Canada – the Special Training School (STS) 103 (which was also known as "Camp X"), de Relwyskow returned to Britain before being sent to the Far East.

Relwyskow died at his Leeds home in 1942. He left a wife, Clara, and sons, Douglas and George. Douglas was a professional wrestling referee whose own son, also called Douglas (grandson of the original George), became a regular face on televised professional wrestling in the UK under the name Barry Douglas (and briefly as the masked Battle Star). Barry Douglas died on 23 February 2024.

== Relwyskow Promotions ==
Relwyskow Promotions
- Founded: 1986 (as independent)
- Defunct: 1994
- Style: Professional wrestling
- Headquarters: Scotland
- Founder(s): Ann Relwyskow (as independent); George de Relwyskow Jr (as member of Joint Promotions)
- Formerly: part of Joint Promotions

The younger George de Relwyskow pursued a career in professional wrestling cut short by an injury in World War II. He later became a successful wrestling promoter and member of Joint Promotions, and the promotional business was continued after he died in 1980 by his daughter Ann. Unlike other Joint members, Ann Relwyskow did not sell her share on to Max Crabtree in 1986 but remained independent as part of Joint until her retirement in 1994, contributing her own matches to ITV's coverage as well as two later TV tapings broadcast regionally on STV and Grampian TV in 1990 and 1993.

== Publications ==
- The Art of Wrestling Gale & Polden, London (1919)
- My Simple Way to Health (1924)
- The Art of Wrestling Naval and Military Press, (2017)
