= William Wood (wrestler) =

British wrestler (1886–1971)

Olympic medal record

Men's freestyle wrestling

Representing Great Britain

Olympic Games
Silver medal – second place	1908 London	Lightweight

William Wood (6 November 1886 – 29 April 1971) was a British wrestler who competed in the 1908 Summer Olympics. In 1908, at the 1908 Summer Olympics, he won the silver medal in the freestyle wrestling lightweight class. He was the father of William Alan Wood.
