= Bill Woods (Australian footballer) =

Australian rules footballer

Personal information
- Full name: William Woods
- Born: 31 August 1890; Portarlington, Victoria
- Died: c. 1972 (aged 81–82); Heidelberg, Victoria
- Original team: Ashby
- Height: 1.64 m (5 ft 5 in)
- Weight: 54 kg (119 lb)

Playing career^{1}
Years	Club	Games (Goals)
1909	Geelong	2 (0)
- ^{1} Playing statistics correct to the end of 1909.

William Woods (31 August 1890 – c. 1972) is a former Australian rules footballer who played with Geelong in the Victorian Football League (VFL).

== Family ==
The son of William Woods, a farmer, and Isabella Woods, née Cornell, William Woods was born at Portarlington, Victoria on 31 August 1890.

He married Linda Barbara "Mardi" Allen (1889–1991) on 21 August 1915. They had one child, a daughter.

== Military service ==
He enlisted in the First AIF in 1915, served overseas, sustained a gunshot wound to the head in action in France in 1916, and returned to Australia in 1919.

== Death ==
He died at Heidelberg, Victoria in 1972.
