= 50th Alabama Infantry Regiment =

Infantry regiment of the Confederate States Army

- Flag of Alabama in 1861 (obverse and reverse)
- Active: April 3, 1862 to April 9, 1865
- Country: Confederate States of America
- Allegiance: Alabama
- Branch: Confederate States Army
- Type: Infantry
- Engagements: Battle of Shiloh; Siege of Corinth; Battle of Stones River; Tullahoma Campaign; Battle of Chickamauga; Battle of Chattanooga; Atlanta campaign Battle of New Hope Church; Battle of Peachtree Creek; Battle of Atlanta; Battle of Ezra Church; Battle of Franklin; Battle of Nashville; Carolinas campaign Battle of Wyse Fork; Battle of Bentonville

Commanders
- Notable commanders: Col. John G. Coltart

The 50th Alabama Infantry Regiment was an infantry regiment of the Confederate States Army during the American Civil War. The regiment was originally named 26th Alabama (Coltart's), but was renamed 50th Alabama on June 6, 1863.

It is not to be confused with another 26th Alabama (O'Neill's) which was formed around the same time and served with the Army of Northern Virginia and later Army of Tennessee.

== Organization and muster ==
The 26th Alabama (Coltart's) was formed on April 3, 1862 at Corinth, Mississippi by consolidating the 2nd and 5th Alabama Infantry Battalions. It was consolidated with the 39th Alabama during the first half of 1863; this was on the field and not officially confirmed.

The regiment was redesignated as the 50th Alabama Infantry Regiment on June 6, 1863 to avoid confusion with the other 26th Alabama.

The regiment was consolidated with the 22nd, 25th and 39th Alabama Infantry on April 9, 1865 to form the 22nd Alabama Infantry Regiment (Consolidated). The latter surrendered at Greensboro, North Carolina on April 26, 1865.

== See also ==
- List of Confederate units from Alabama
