= William Alan Wood =

British civil servant (1916–2010)

Sir William Alan Wood, KCVO, CB (8 December 1916 – 28 June 2010) was a British civil servant.

Wood was born on 8 December 1916 in Manchester; his father was then fighting in the First World War and his mother returned after the war to their family home in London, where Wood was educated. He attended Corpus Christi College, Cambridge, where he read classics and played rugby and judo. He joined the Northern Ireland Ministry of Home Affairs in 1939 and was initially exempted from war service; his duties at the Ministry related to organising emergency hospital planning. He then served with the Royal Naval Volunteer Reserve from 1942 to 1946, when he was demobilised and moved to the Ministry of Town and Country Planning. There, he was "one of the main architects of the Town and Country Planning Act (1947) ... one of the chief drafters of perhaps the most important piece of planning legislation in 20th-century Britain". In preparation for this work, he travelled around Britain to lecture planning officials on the Act; he wrote Planning and the Law as a guidebook.

In 1951, Wood was appointed Private Secretary to the Minister and, after the Ministry was merged into the Ministry of Housing and Local Government, he was appointed Principal Regional Officer for the West Midlands in 1954. Two years later, he was promoted to the grade of Assistant Secretary and given responsibility for the Water Division. In 1964, he was appointed Under-Secretary in charge of the Planning Division, serving for four years until (in 1968) he was made Second Crown Estate Commissioner. He managed projects to renovate large parts of the Crown Estate including Windsor Castle and Carlton House Terrace. In 1970, he was appointed a Companion of the Order of the Bath and, on retirement in 1978, he was appointed a Knight Commander of the Royal Victorian Order.

Wood subsequently chaired charitable housing organisations and trusts, and was ombudsman of the Mirror Group of newspapers from 1985 to 1989. Wood died on 28 June 2010, aged 93.
