= William D. Wood =

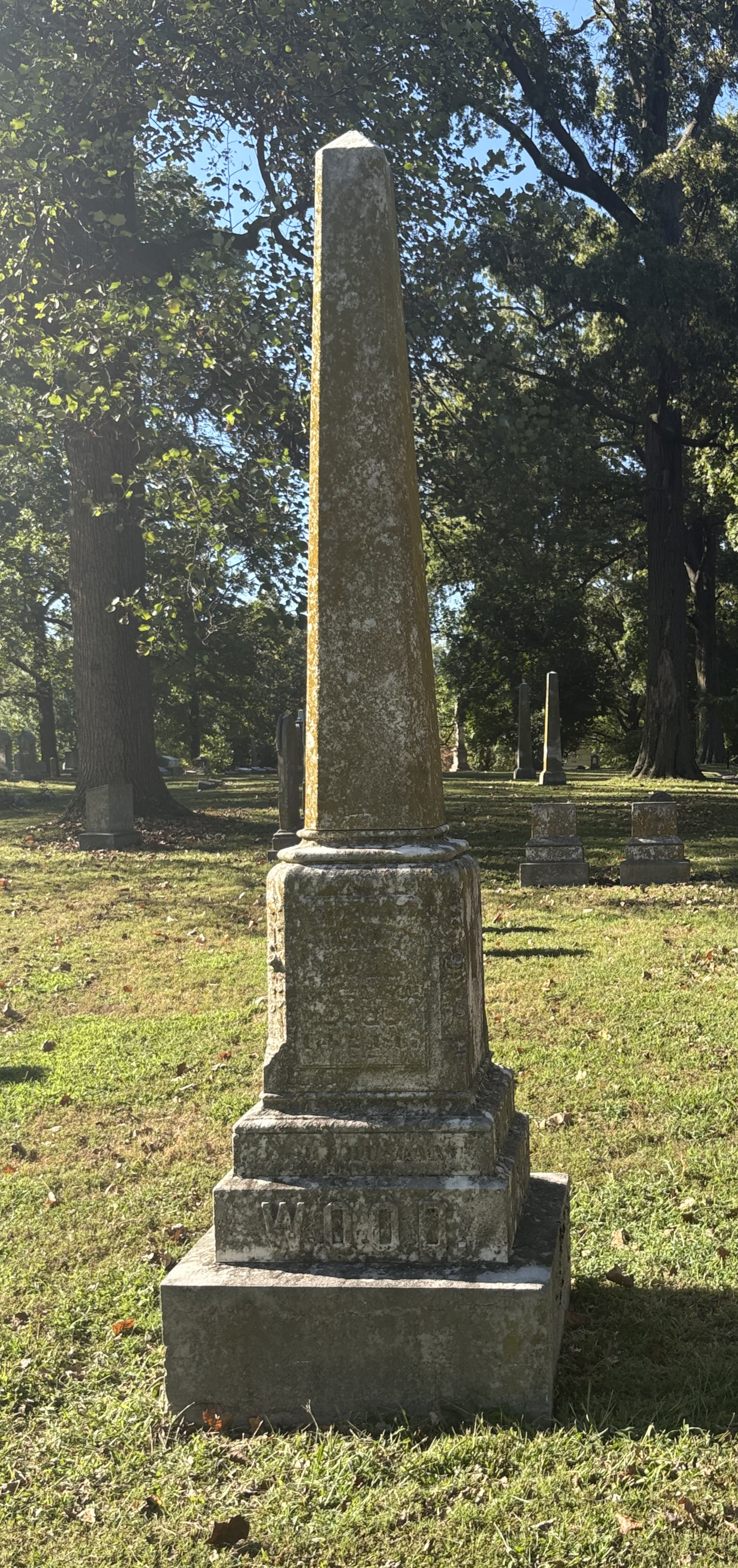
Wood's grave at Bellefontaine Cemetery

William D. Wood (December 14, 1822 – February 2, 1867) was a Union Army officer during the American Civil War. He began the war serving as aide-de-camp to Hamilton Gamble, governor of Missouri, in the Missouri militia. On December 14, 1863, Wood was appointed colonel of the 11th Missouri Volunteer Cavalry Regiment. He resigned his commission in the volunteers on April 8, 1865.

In recognition of his service, on January 13, 1866, President Andrew Johnson nominated Wood for appointment to the grade of brevet brigadier general of volunteers, to rank from March 13, 1865, and the United States Senate confirmed the appointment on March 12, 1866.

Wood died in St. Louis on February 2, 1867, and was buried at Bellefontaine Cemetery.

== See also ==
- List of American Civil War brevet generals (Union)
