= Firestone (surname) =

Firestone is a surname. Notable people with the surname include:

- Andrew Firestone (born 1975), American television personality and businessman
- Bertram Firestone (1931–2021), American Thoroughbred breeder alongside Diana Firestone
- Brooks Firestone (born 1936), American businessman and politician
- Bruce Firestone (born 1951), Canadian businessman and writer
- Cinda Firestone (born 1948), American film director
- Dennis Firestone (born 1944), Australian race car driver
- Diana Firestone (1932–2023), American Thoroughbred breeder alongside Diana Firestone
- Eddie Firestone (1920–2007), American radio, television, and film actor
- Elizabeth Parke Firestone (1897–1900), American clothing collector
- Esther Ghan Firestone (1925–2015), Canadian female cantor
- Floyd Firestone (1898–1986), American acoustical physicist and engineer
- Forest Firestone (1876–1940), American college football player and coach
- George Firestone (1931–2012), American politician
- Harvey S. Firestone (1868–1938), American businessman and the founder of Firestone Tire and Rubber Company
- Harvey S. Firestone Jr. (1898–1973), American businessman
- Idabelle Smith Firestone (1874–1954), American composer and songwriter
- Jamison Firestone (born 1966), American attorney
- Jared Firestone (born 1990), American-born Israeli skeleton racer and lawyer
- Jay Firestone (born 1956), Canadian film and television producer
- Jo Firestone (born c. 1986), American actress, comedian, and television writer
- Leonard Firestone (1907–1996), American businessman and diplomat
- Martha Firestone Ford (born 1925), American businesswoman and football team owner
- Mary K. Firestone, American microbiologist
- Nancy B. Firestone (1951–2022), United States Court of Federal Claims judge
- Nick Firestone (born 1966), American race car driver
- Renée Firestone (born 1924), Czechoslovak-Jewish fashion designer and Holocaust survivor
- Reuven Firestone (born 1952), American historian of religion
- Riz Tupai-Firestone, Samoan-New Zealand academic
- Roy Firestone (born 1953), American sports commentator and journalist
- Tirzah Firestone (born 1954), American analytical psychotherapist and Jewish Renewal rabbi
- Wayne Firestone, American playwright and veteran non-profit leader

== Others ==
- Feuerstein
- Time, Inc. v. Firestone (1976), U.S. Supreme Court case concerning defamation suits against public figures
