= 2019 Detroit Lions season =

90th season in franchise history

- Owner: Martha Firestone Ford
- General manager: Bob Quinn
- Head coach: Matt Patricia
- Home stadium: Ford Field

Results
- Record: 3–12–1
- Division place: 4th NFC North
- Playoffs: Did not qualify
- All-Pros: None
- Pro Bowlers: CB Darius Slay; WR Kenny Golladay (alternate)

Uniform
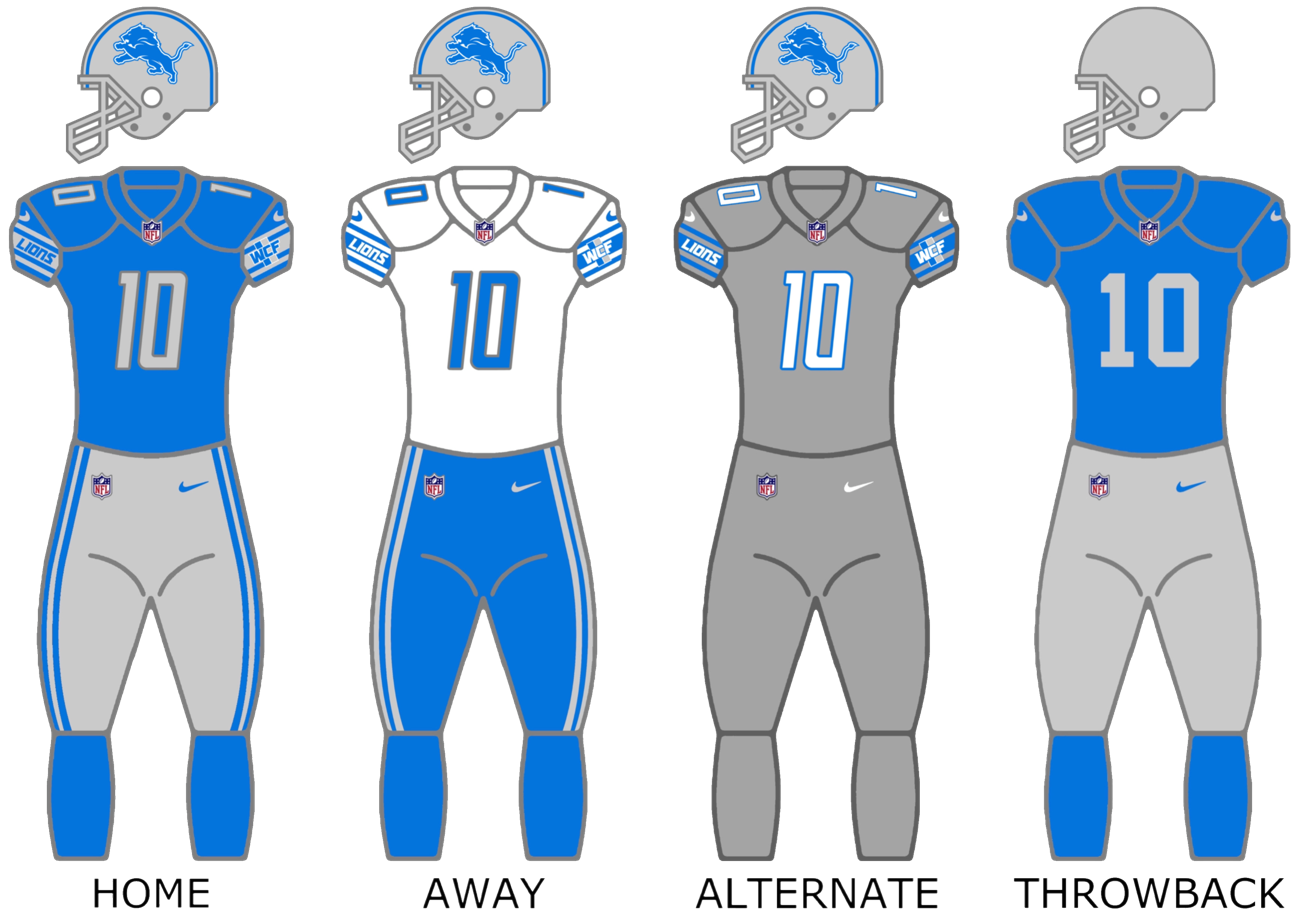

The 2019 season was the Detroit Lions' 90th in the National Football League (NFL) and their second year under head coach Matt Patricia. The Lions had a promising start to the season with a 2–0–1 record. However, they lost 12 of their last 13 games, with 8 of those 12 losses being decided by a touchdown or less, and were mathematically eliminated from postseason contention following a Thanksgiving Day loss to the Chicago Bears in week 13. After franchise quarterback Matthew Stafford broke his backbone in a Week 9 loss to the Oakland Raiders, the Lions were forced to turn to former Cincinnati Bengals backup quarterback Jeff Driskel and later undrafted free agent David Blough, neither of whom was able to lead the Lions to a single win. The Lions failed to improve on their 6–10 record from last season, finishing the season with a 3–12–1 record and nine consecutive losses. This resulted in the 3rd pick of the 2020 NFL Draft. They also posted consecutive losing seasons for the first time since 2012–2013. Not only that, they also got swept by their division rivals for the first time since 2012.

== Offseason ==
=== Coaching changes ===
- On January 1, the Lions announced that Jim Bob Cooter would not return as offensive coordinator.
- On January 16, the Lions hired Darrell Bevell as offensive coordinator.
- On January 22, the Lions hired John Bonamego as special teams coordinator.
- On February 26, the Lions hired Kyle Caskey as running backs coach.
- On March 11, the Lions hired Stephen Thomas as defensive quality control coach, Rodney Hill as assistant strength and performance coach, Leon Washington as WCF minority coaching assistantship/offense and special teams coach, and Marquice Williams as assistant special teams coach.

=== Additions ===
Date	Player	Position	Previous team	Contract	Source
January 1	Connor Cook	Quarterback	Cincinnati Bengals	1 year / $645,000	
March 11	Danny Amendola	Wide receiver	Miami Dolphins	1 year / $5.75 million	
March 14	Justin Coleman	Cornerback	Seattle Seahawks	4 years / $36 million	
March 14	Trey Flowers	Defensive end	New England Patriots	5 years / $90 million	
March 14	Jesse James	Tight end	Pittsburgh Steelers	4 years / $22.6 million	
March 14	Oday Aboushi	Guard	Arizona Cardinals	1 year / $2 million	
March 14	Andrew Adams	Safety	Tampa Bay Buccaneers	1 year / $920,000	
March 19	Tommylee Lewis	Wide receiver	New Orleans Saints	1 year / $920,000	
March 21	Logan Thomas	Tight end	Buffalo Bills	1 year / $895,000	
March 23	Rashaan Melvin	Cornerback	Oakland Raiders	1 year / $2.15 million	
April 5	C. J. Anderson	Running back	Los Angeles Rams	1 year / $1.5 million	
April 9	Tom Savage	Quarterback	Cincinnati Bengals	1 year / $895,000	
May 9	T. J. Hockenson	Tight end	Iowa	4 year / $19.82 million	
May 9	Amani Oruwariye	Cornerback	Penn State	4 year / $2.84 million	
May 9	Jahlani Tavai	Linebacker	Hawaii	4 year / $6.89 million	
May 10	Nate Becker	Tight end	Miami	Undrafted FA	
May 10	Beau Benzschawel	Guard	Wisconsin	Undrafted FA	
May 10	Malik Carney	Linebacker	North Carolina	Undrafted FA	
May 10	Jonathan Duhart	Wide receiver	Old Dominion	Undrafted FA	
May 10	Tre Lamar	Linebacker	Clemson	Undrafted FA	
May 10	C. J. Moore	Safety	Mississippi	Undrafted FA	
May 10	Matt Nelson	Tackle	Iowa	Undrafted FA	
May 10	Donald Parham	Tight end	Stetson	Undrafted FA	
May 10	Anthony Pittman	Linebacker	Wayne State	Undrafted FA	
May 10	Ryan Pope	Tackle	San Diego State	Undrafted FA	
May 10	Ray Smith	Defensive tackle	Boston College	Undrafted FA	
May 10	Micah St. Andrew	Guard	Fresno State	Undrafted FA	
May 10	Kevin Strong	Defensive tackle	UTSA	Undrafted FA	
May 12	Tom Kennedy	Wide receiver	Bryant University	3 year / $1.755 million	
May 12	Jordan Smallwood	Wide receiver	Kansas City Chiefs	1 year / –	
May 13	Austin Bryant	Defensive end	Clemson	4 year / $3.24 million	
May 13	P. J. Johnson	Defensive tackle	Arizona	4 year / $2.616 million	
May 13	Ty Johnson	Running back	Maryland	4 year / $2.69 million	
May 13	Isaac Nauta	Tight end	Georgia	4 year / $2.62 million	
May 13	Juwon Young	Linebacker	Marshall	1 year / –	
May 14	Travis Fulgham	Wide receiver	Old Dominion	4 year / $2.698 million	
June 3	Will Harris	Safety	Boston College	4 year / $3.472 million	
June 3	Brandon Reilly	Wide receiver	Dallas Cowboys	2 year / $1.23 million	
June 6	Jermaine Kearse	Wide receiver	New York Jets	1 year / $1.35 million	
June 10	Luke Bowanko	Center	Washington Redskins	1 year / –	
June 10	David Fales	Quarterback	Miami Dolphins	1 year / –	
July 22	Austin Traylor	Tight end	Salt Lake Stallions	1 year / $570,000	
July 26	Mike Daniels	Defensive tackle	Green Bay Packers	1 year / $9.1 million	
July 30	Fred Jones	Defensive tackle	New York Jets	1 year / $495,000	
August 4	Tarvarus McFadden	Cornerback	San Francisco 49ers	1 year / $495,000	
August 28	James Williams	Running back	Washington State	Undrafted FA	

=== Departures ===
Date	Player	Position	Note	New Team	Source
February 15	Glover Quin	Safety	Retired	—N/a	
February 15	Bruce Ellington	Wide receiver	Released	New England Patriots	
February 15	Nicholas Grigsby	Linebacker	Released	Baltimore Ravens	
March 8	T. J. Lang	Guard	Retired	—N/a	
March 10	Nevin Lawson	Cornerback	Released	Oakland Raiders	
March 11	Trevor Bates	Linebacker	Released		
March 18	Kerry Hyder	Defensive end	UFA	Dallas Cowboys	
March 29	Luke Willson	Tight end	UFA	Oakland Raiders	
April 10	Eli Harold	Defensive end	UFA	Buffalo Bills	
May 8	Ezekiel Ansah	Defensive end	UFA	Seattle Seahawks	
May 9	Nick Bellore	Fullback	UFA	Seattle Seahawks	
May 15	Levine Toilolo	Tight end	UFA	San Francisco 49ers	
June 10	Connor Cook	Quarterback	Released		
June 14	Michael Roberts	Tight end	Released	Green Bay Packers	
July 27	Theo Riddick	Running back	Released	Denver Broncos	
August 4	Deontez Alexander	Wide receiver	Released		
August 27	Zach Zenner	Running back	Released		

=== Re-signings ===
Date	Player	Position	Contract	Source
February 13	Don Muhlbach	Long snapper	1 year / $1.12 million	
March 1	Romeo Okwara	Defensive end	2 years / $6.8 million	
March 12	Zach Zenner	Running back	1 year / –	
March 18	Marcus Cooper	Cornerback	1 year / $895,000	
March 22	Andrew Donnal	Offensive tackle	1 year / $845,000	

=== Trades ===
- On June 13, the Lions originally traded tight end Michael Roberts to the New England Patriots in exchange for a conditional seventh-round pick in the 2020 NFL draft. The trade was rescinded the next day, and Roberts was subsequently released by the Lions.
- On October 22, the Lions traded safety Quandre Diggs and a seventh-round pick in the 2021 NFL draft to the Seattle Seahawks for a fifth-round pick in the 2020 NFL draft.

=== NFL draft ===
2019 Detroit Lions draft
Round	Pick	Player	Position	College	Notes
1	8	T. J. Hockenson *	TE	Iowa	
2	43	Jahlani Tavai	LB	Hawaii	
3	81	Will Harris	S	Boston College	
4	117	Austin Bryant	DE	Clemson	
5	146	Amani Oruwariye	CB	Penn State	
6	184	Travis Fulgham	WR	Old Dominion	
6	186	Ty Johnson	RB	Maryland	
7	224	Isaac Nauta	TE	Georgia	
7	229	P. J. Johnson	DT	Arizona	
Made roster * Made at least one Pro Bowl during career

==== Draft trades ====
- The Lions acquired a fourth-round selection (No. 114) from the New England Patriots in the 2018 draft in exchange for a third-round selection in the 2019 draft.
- The Lions received a third round selection from the Philadelphia Eagles in exchange for wide receiver Golden Tate.
- The Lions acquired a third-round selection (No. 81) from the Minnesota Vikings in exchange for their original third-round selection (No. 88) and a sixth-round selection (No. 204).
- The Lions acquired a fourth-round selection (No. 117) and a sixth-round selection (No. 186) from the Atlanta Falcons in exchange for their original fourth-round selection (No. 111).
- The Miami Dolphins traded a conditional seventh-round selection to Detroit in exchange for defensive tackle Akeem Spence.
- Detroit traded a fifth-round selection to the New York Giants in exchange for defensive tackle Damon Harrison. The condition was that the Giants would receive the higher of Detroit or San Francisco's 5th round selections.
- The San Francisco 49ers traded their fifth-round selection to Detroit in exchange for guard Laken Tomlinson.

== Staff ==
2019 Detroit Lions staff
Front office: Owner/chairwoman – Martha Firestone Ford; Vice chairwoman – Martha Ford Morse; Vice chairman – William Clay Ford Jr.; Vice chairwoman – Sheila Ford Hamp; Vice chairwoman – Elizabeth Ford Kontulis; Team President – Rod Wood; Executive vice president / general manager – Bob Quinn; Senior vice president of administration, CFO – Allison Maki; Vice president of football administration – Mike Disner; Vice president of player personnel – Kyle O'Brien; Director of player personnel – Lance Newmark; Director of pro scouting – Rob Lohman; Assistant director of college scouting – Dave Sears; Senior Personnel Executive – Jimmy Raye III; Head coaches: Head coach – Matt Patricia; Offensive coaches: Offensive coordinator – Darrell Bevell; Quarterbacks – Sean Ryan; Running backs – Kyle Caskey; Wide receivers – Robert Prince; Tight ends – Chris White; Offensive line – Jeff Davidson; Assistant offensive line – Hank Fraley; Offensive quality control – Ben Johnson	Defensive coaches: Defensive coordinator – Paul Pasqualoni; Defensive line – Bo Davis; Linebackers – Al Golden; Defensive backs – Brian Stewart; Defensive assistant – Steve Gregory; Defensive quality control – Stephen Thomas; Special teams coaches: Special teams coordinator – John Bonamego; Assistant special teams – Marquice Williams; Strength and conditioning: Head strength and conditioning – Harold Nash; Assistant strength and conditioning – Josh Schuler; WCF Minority Coaching Assistantship: WCF minority coaching assistantship/defense – Billy Yates; WCF minority coaching assistantship/offense and special teams – Leon Washington

== Final roster ==
2019 Detroit Lions roster
Quarterbacks (QB): 10 David Blough; 1 Kyle Sloter; Running backs (RB): 36 Wes Hills; 33 Kerryon Johnson; 31 Ty Johnson; 41 J. D. McKissic; 43 Bo Scarbrough; Wide receivers (WR): 80 Danny Amendola; 14 Travis Fulgham; 19 Kenny Golladay; 15 Chris Lacy; Tight ends (TE): 83 Jesse James; 89 Isaac Nauta; 82 Logan Thomas	Offensive linemen (OL): 76 Oday Aboushi G; 74 Caleb Benenoch G; 63 Beau Benzschawel G; 65 Tyrell Crosby T; 68 Taylor Decker T; 60 Graham Glasgow G; 77 Frank Ragnow C; 70 Dan Skipper T; 71 Rick Wagner T; Defensive linemen (DL): 99 John Atkins DT; 94 Austin Bryant DE; 90 Trey Flowers DE; 98 Damon Harrison DT; 75 Frank Herron DT; 61 Jamie Meder DT; 95 Romeo Okwara DE; 91 A'Shawn Robinson DT; 69 Jonathan Wynn DE	Linebackers (LB): 53 Jason Cabinda MLB; 42 Devon Kennard OLB; 54 Steve Longa OLB; 57 Anthony Pittman OLB; 44 Jalen Reeves-Maybin OLB; Defensive backs (DB): 39 Jamal Agnew CB/RS; 27 Justin Coleman CB; 38 Mike Ford CB; 25 Will Harris FS; 28 Mike Jackson CB; 35 Miles Killebrew SS; 29 Rashaan Melvin CB; 49 C. J. Moore FS; 24 Amani Oruwariye CB; 23 Darius Slay CB; 30 Dee Virgin CB; 21 Tracy Walker FS; 32 Tavon Wilson SS; Special teams (ST): 6 Sam Martin P; 48 Don Muhlbach LS; 5 Matt Prater K	Practice squad: 13 Victor Bolden WR; 8 Joe Callahan QB; 12 Jonathan Duhart WR; 3 Jack Fox P; 45 A. J. Howard SS; 85 Tom Kennedy WR; 67 Matt Nelson T; 78 Olive Sagapolu DT; 59 Christian Sam OLB; 72 Casey Tucker G; Reserve: 46 Nick Bawden FB (IR); 66 Joe Dahl G (IR); 96 Mike Daniels DT (IR); 40 Jarrad Davis MLB (IR); 2 Jeff Driskel QB (IR); 17 Marvin Hall WR (IR); 93 Da'Shawn Hand DE (IR); 88 T. J. Hockenson TE (IR); 52 Christian Jones OLB (IR); 11 Marvin Jones WR (IR); 18 Jermaine Kearse WR (IR); 97 Darius Kilgo DT (IR); 9 Matthew Stafford QB (IR); 92 Kevin Strong DT (IR); 51 Jahlani Tavai MLB (IR); 79 Kenny Wiggins G (IR); Rookies in italics 53 active, 16 reserve, 10 practice squad

== Preseason ==
Week	Date	Opponent	Result	Record	Venue	Recap
1	August 8	New England Patriots	L 3–31	0–1	Ford Field	Recap
2	August 17	at Houston Texans	L 23–30	0–2	NRG Stadium	Recap
3	August 23	Buffalo Bills	L 20–24	0–3	Ford Field	Recap
4	August 29	at Cleveland Browns	L 16–20	0–4	FirstEnergy Stadium	Recap

== Regular season ==
=== Schedule ===
Week	Date	Opponent	Result	Record	Venue	Recap
1	September 8	at Arizona Cardinals	**T** 27–27 (OT)	0–0–1	State Farm Stadium	Recap
2	September 15	Los Angeles Chargers	**W** 13–10	1–0–1	Ford Field	Recap
3	September 22	at Philadelphia Eagles	**W** 27–24	2–0–1	Lincoln Financial Field	Recap
4	September 29	Kansas City Chiefs	**L** 30–34	2–1–1	Ford Field	Recap
5	Bye					
6	October 14	at **Green Bay Packers**	**L** 22–23	2–2–1	Lambeau Field	Recap
7	October 20	**Minnesota Vikings**	**L** 30–42	2–3–1	Ford Field	Recap
8	October 27	New York Giants	**W** 31–26	3–3–1	Ford Field	Recap
9	November 3	at Oakland Raiders	**L** 24–31	3–4–1	RingCentral Coliseum	Recap
10	November 10	at **Chicago Bears**	**L** 13–20	3–5–1	Soldier Field	Recap
11	November 17	Dallas Cowboys	**L** 27–35	3–6–1	Ford Field	Recap
12	November 24	at Washington Redskins	**L** 16–19	3–7–1	FedExField	Recap
13	November 28	**Chicago Bears**	**L** 20–24	3–8–1	Ford Field	Recap
14	December 8	at **Minnesota Vikings**	**L** 7–20	3–9–1	U.S. Bank Stadium	Recap
15	December 15	Tampa Bay Buccaneers	**L** 17–38	3–10–1	Ford Field	Recap
16	December 22	at Denver Broncos	**L** 17–27	3–11–1	Empower Field at Mile High	Recap
17	December 29	**Green Bay Packers**	**L** 20–23	3–12–1	Ford Field	Recap

Note: Intra-division opponents are in bold text.

=== Game summaries ===
==== Week 1: at Arizona Cardinals ====
Week One: Detroit Lions at Arizona Cardinals – Game summary

Quarter	1	2	3	4	OT	Total
Lions	0	17	0	7	3	**27**
Cardinals	0	3	3	18	3	**27**

at State Farm Stadium, Glendale, Arizona

- Date: September 8
- Game time: 4:25 p.m. EDT/1:25 p.m. MST
- Game weather: None (retractable roof closed)
- Game attendance: 60,687
- Referee: Scott Novak
- TV announcers (Fox): Dick Stockton, Mark Schlereth and Jennifer Hale
- Recap, Game Book

Game information

**First quarter**

- No scoring plays.

**Second quarter**

- DET – Matt Prater 55-yard field goal, 14:07. Lions 3–0. **Drive: 10 plays, 43 yards, 5:38.**
- DET – Danny Amendola 47-yard pass from Matthew Stafford (Matt Prater kick), 12:23. Lions 10–0. **Drive: 2 plays, 51 yards, 0:47.**
- DET – Kenny Golladay 9-yard pass from Matthew Stafford (Matt Prater kick), 3:38. Lions 17–0. **Drive: 9 plays, 95 yards, 6:09.**
- ARI – Zane Gonzalez 20-yard field goal, 1:19. Lions 17–3. **Drive: 4 plays, 6 yards, 0:21.**

**Third quarter**

- ARI – Zane Gonzalez 42-yard field goal, 4:38. Lions 17–6. **Drive: 8 plays, 42 yards, 2:34.**

**Fourth quarter**

- DET – T. J. Hockenson 23-yard pass from Matthew Stafford (Matt Prater kick), 14:47. Lions 24–6. **Drive: 10 plays, 82 yards, 4:51.**
- ARI – Zane Gonzalez 34-yard field goal, 11:09. Lions 24–9. **Drive: 10 plays, 58 yards, 3:38.**
- ARI – David Johnson 27-yard pass from Kyler Murray (Zane Gonzalez kick), 5:57. Lions 24–16. **Drive: 7 plays, 70 yards, 2:55.**
- ARI – Larry Fitzgerald 4-yard pass from Kyler Murray (Kyler Murray pass to Christian Kirk), 0:43. Tied 24–24. **Drive: 9 plays, 60 yards, 1:48.**

**Overtime**

- ARI – Zane Gonzalez 28-yard field goal, 7:17. Cardinals 27–24. **Drive: 7 plays, 65 yards, 2:43.**
- DET – Matt Prater 33-yard field goal, 3:48. Tied 27–27. **Drive: 8 plays, 60 yards, 3:29.**

**Top passers**

- DET – Matthew Stafford – 27/45, 385 yards, 3 TD
- ARI – Kyler Murray – 29/54, 308 yards, 2 TD, INT

**Top rushers**

- DET – Kerryon Johnson – 16 rushes, 49 yards
- ARI – David Johnson – 18 rushes, 82 yards

**Top receivers**

- DET – T. J. Hockenson – 6 receptions, 131 yards, TD
- ARI – Larry Fitzgerald – 8 receptions, 113 yards, TD

The Lions began the regular season on the road against the Arizona Cardinals. After a scoreless first quarter, the Lions took a big lead by scoring 17 points in the second quarter via a 55-yard field goal by Matt Prater, a 47-yard touchdown pass from Matthew Stafford to Danny Amendola and a nine-yard touchdown pass from Stafford to Kenny Golladay. Arizona responded with a 20-yard field goal by Zane Gonzalez to make the score 17–3 in favor of Detroit at half-time. Arizona scored the only points of the third quarter via a 42-yard field goal by Gonzalez. Detroit extended their lead in the fourth quarter via a 23-yard touchdown pass from Stafford to T. J. Hockenson. The Cardinals responded with 18 points in the fourth quarter, via a 34-yard field goal by Gonzalez, a 27-yard touchdown pass from Kyler Murray to David Johnson, and a four-yard touchdown pass from Murray to Larry Fitzgerald, followed by a two-point conversion pass from Murray to Christian Kirk to tie the game and force overtime. In overtime, the Cardinals scored via a 28-yard field goal by Gonzalez, and the Lions scored via a 33-yard field goal by Prater to re-tie the score before time expired. This was the first tie by the Lions since 1984 against the Philadelphia Eagles.

==== Week 2: vs. Los Angeles Chargers ====
Week Two: Los Angeles Chargers at Detroit Lions – Game summary

Quarter	1	2	3	4	Total
Chargers	7	3	0	0	**10**
**Lions**	6	0	0	7	**13**

at Ford Field, Detroit, Michigan

- Date: September 15
- Game time: 1:00 p.m. EDT
- Game weather: None (indoor stadium)
- Game attendance: 60,158
- Referee: Craig Wrolstad
- TV announcers (CBS): Kevin Harlan, Rich Gannon and Jay Feely
- Recap, Game Book

Game information

**First quarter**

- LAC – Austin Ekeler 1-yard run (Ty Long kick), 7:57. Chargers 7–0. **Drive: 9 plays, 68 yards, 4:24.**
- DET – Kerryon Johnson 36-yard pass from Matthew Stafford (kick failed, wide left), 4:10. Chargers 7–6. **Drive: 8 plays, 75 yards, 3:47.**

**Second quarter**

- LAC – Ty Long 39-yard field goal, 0:00. Chargers 10–6. **Drive: 7 plays, 76 yards, 1:20.**

**Third quarter**

- No scoring plays.

**Fourth quarter**

- DET – Kenny Golladay 31-yard pass from Matthew Stafford (Matt Prater kick), 7:21. Lions 13–10. **Drive: 8 plays, 69 yards, 4:24.**

**Top passers**

- LAC – Philip Rivers – 21/36, 293 yards, INT
- DET – Matthew Stafford – 22/30, 245 yards, 2 TD, 2 INT

**Top rushers**

- LAC – Austin Ekeler – 17 rushes, 66 yards, TD
- DET – Kerryon Johnson – 12 rushes, 41 yards

**Top receivers**

- LAC – Keenan Allen – 8 receptions, 98 yards
- DET – Kenny Golladay – 8 receptions, 117 yards, TD

In week 2, the Lions began their home schedule against the Los Angeles Chargers. The Chargers took an early lead in the first quarter via a one-yard touchdown run from Austin Ekeler. The Lions responded with a 36-yard touchdown pass from Matthew Stafford to Kerryon Johnson, and after a failed extra point conversion, the Lions trailed by a point. The Chargers extended their lead in the second quarter via a 39-yard field goal by Ty Long, making the score 10–6 in favor of Los Angeles at half-time. After a scoreless third quarter, Detroit scored the only points of the second half via a 31-yard touchdown pass from Stafford to Kenny Golladay to take a 13–10 lead. The Chargers' attempted comeback failed when a Philip Rivers pass was intercepted by Darius Slay in the end zone with 1:03 to play in the game, giving the Lions their first win of the season.

==== Week 3: at Philadelphia Eagles ====
Week Three: Detroit Lions at Philadelphia Eagles – Game summary

Quarter	1	2	3	4	Total
**Lions**	7	13	0	7	**27**
Eagles	10	0	7	7	**24**

at Lincoln Financial Field, Philadelphia, Pennsylvania

- Date: September 22
- Game time: 1:00 p.m. EDT
- Game weather: Sunny, 84 °F (29 °C)
- Game attendance: 69,796
- Referee: Tony Corrente
- TV announcers (Fox): Thom Brennaman, Chris Spielman and Shannon Spake
- Recap, Game Book

Game information

**First quarter**

- PHI – Jake Elliott 25-yard field goal, 11:28. Eagles 3–0. **Drive: 9 plays, 69 yards, 3:32.**
- DET – Jamal Agnew 100-yard kickoff return (Matt Prater kick), 11:14. Lions 7–3. **Drive: 0 plays, 0 yards, 0:14.**
- PHI – Jordan Howard 1-yard run (Jake Elliott kick), 6:15. Eagles 10–7. **Drive: 9 plays, 75 yards, 4:59.**

**Second quarter**

- DET – Kerryon Johnson 1-yard run (Matt Prater kick), 14:09. Lions 14–10. **Drive: 13 plays, 75 yards, 7:06.**
- DET – Matt Prater 25-yard field goal, 3:29. Lions 17–10. **Drive: 5 plays, 44 yards, 1:21.**
- DET – Matt Prater 33-yard field goal, 0:57. Lions 20–10. **Drive: 4 plays, 7 yards, 0:54.**

**Third quarter**

- PHI – Nelson Agholor 20-yard pass from Carson Wentz (Jake Elliott kick), 4:15. Lions 20–17. **Drive: 6 plays, 47 yards, 2:44.**

**Fourth quarter**

- DET – Marvin Jones 12-yard pass from Matthew Stafford (Matt Prater kick), 14:53. Lions 27–17. **Drive: 9 plays, 75 yards, 4:22.**
- PHI – Nelson Agholor 2-yard pass from Carson Wentz (Jake Elliott kick), 6:59. Lions 27–24. **Drive: 10 plays, 80 yards, 4:32.**

**Top passers**

- DET – Matthew Stafford – 18/32, 201 yards, TD
- PHI – Carson Wentz – 19/36, 259 yards, 2 TD

**Top rushers**

- DET – J. D. McKissic – 1 rush, 44 yards
- PHI – Miles Sanders – 13 rushes, 53 yards

**Top receivers**

- DET – Marvin Jones – 6 receptions, 101 yards, TD
- PHI – Miles Sanders – 2 receptions, 73 yards

In week 3, the Lions visited the Philadelphia Eagles. The Eagles opened the scoring in the first quarter via a 25-yard field goal by Jake Elliott. The Lions then took the lead when Jamal Agnew returned a kickoff 100 yards for a touchdown, but Philadelphia responded with a one-yard touchdown run from Jordan Howard to take it back. The Lions added 13 points in the second quarter via a one-yard touchdown run from Kerryon Johnson and a pair of field goals by Matt Prater, from 25 and 33 yards, respectively, making the score 20–10 in favor of Detroit at half-time. The Eagles scored the only points of the third quarter via a 20-yard touchdown pass from Carson Wentz to Nelson Agholor. The Lions extended their lead in the fourth quarter via a 12-yard touchdown pass from Matthew Stafford to Marvin Jones. The Eagles responded with a two-yard touchdown pass from Wentz to Agholor, making the score 27-24. The Eagles had two more drives to win or tie the game but both drives ended in failed fourth down attempts.

==== Week 4: vs. Kansas City Chiefs ====
Week Four: Kansas City Chiefs at Detroit Lions – Game summary

Quarter	1	2	3	4	Total
**Chiefs**	0	13	7	14	**34**
Lions	10	3	10	7	**30**

at Ford Field, Detroit, Michigan

- Date: September 29
- Game time: 1:00 p.m. EDT
- Game weather: None (indoor stadium)
- Game attendance: 65,188
- Referee: Walt Anderson
- TV announcers (Fox): Kevin Burkhardt, Charles Davis and Pam Oliver
- Recap, Game Book

Game information

**First quarter**

- DET – Matt Prater 25-yard field goal, 9:22. Lions 3–0. **Drive: 10 plays, 68 yards, 5:38.**
- DET – T. J. Hockenson 5-yard pass from Matthew Stafford (Matt Prater kick), 3:05. Lions 10–0. **Drive: 7 plays, 74 yards, 2:34.**

**Second quarter**

- KC – Harrison Butker 23-yard field goal, 14:12. Lions 10–3. **Drive: 10 plays, 81 yards, 3:53.**
- KC – LeSean McCoy 1-yard run (Harrison Butker kick), 4:13. Tied 10–10. **Drive: 7 plays, 70 yards, 3:57.**
- DET – Matt Prater 48-yard field goal, 1:03. Lions 13–10. **Drive: 8 plays, 50 yards, 3:10.**
- KC – Harrison Butker 44-yard field goal, 0:02. Tied 13–13. **Drive: 6 plays, 49 yards, 1:01.**

**Third quarter**

- KC – Bashaud Breeland 100-yard fumble recovery (Harrison Butker kick), 9:08. Chiefs 20–13.
- DET – Matt Prater 53-yard field goal, 6:19. Chiefs 20–16. **Drive: 7 plays, 40 yards, 2:49.**
- DET – Kenny Golladay 9-yard pass from Matthew Stafford (Matt Prater kick), 1:10. Lions 23–20. **Drive: 8 plays, 45 yards, 3:40.**

**Fourth quarter**

- KC – Darrel Williams 1-yard run (Harrison Butker kick), 12:09. Chiefs 27–23. **Drive: 9 plays, 75 yards, 4:01.**
- DET – Kenny Golladay 6-yard pass from Matthew Stafford (Matt Prater kick), 2:26. Lions 30–27. **Drive: 9 plays, 79 yards, 4:16.**
- KC – Darrel Williams 1-yard run (Harrison Butker kick), 0:20. Chiefs 34–30. **Drive: 13 plays, 79 yards, 2:06.**

**Top passers**

- KC – Patrick Mahomes – 24/42, 315 yards
- DET – Matthew Stafford – 21/34, 291 yards, 3 TD

**Top rushers**

- KC – LeSean McCoy – 11 rushes, 56 yards, TD
- DET – Kerryon Johnson – 26 rushes, 125 yards

**Top receivers**

- KC – Travis Kelce – 7 receptions, 85 yards
- DET – Marvin Jones – 3 receptions, 77 yards

In week 4, the Lions hosted the Kansas City Chiefs. The Lions opened the scoring in the first quarter via a 25-yard field goal by Matt Prater, before extending their lead through a five-yard touchdown pass from Matthew Stafford to T. J. Hockenson. The Chiefs scored 13 points in the second quarter via a pair of field goals by Harrison Butker from 23 yards and 44 yards, respectively, and a one-yard touchdown run from LeSean McCoy. The Lions scored via a 48-yard field goal by Prater, tying the score at 13–13 at halftime. The Chiefs took their first lead of the game in the third quarter via a 100-yard fumble recovery by Bashaud Breeland. The Lions responded with 10 points via a 53-yard field goal by Prater and a nine-yard touchdown pass from Stafford to Kenny Golladay to regain the lead. The teams exchanged touchdowns in the fourth quarter via a one-yard touchdown run from Darrel Williams for the Chiefs and a six-yard touchdown pass from Stafford to Golladay for the Lions. The Chiefs scored the game's final points via a one-yard touchdown run from Williams, making the final score 34–30 in favor of Kansas City, and giving the Lions their first loss of the season, going into their bye week with a 2–1–1 record. The Lions also failed to start the season with 3 wins for the first time since 2011.

==== Week 6: at Green Bay Packers ====
Week Six: Detroit Lions at Green Bay Packers – Game summary

Quarter	1	2	3	4	Total
Lions	10	3	6	3	**22**
**Packers**	0	10	3	10	**23**

at Lambeau Field, Green Bay, Wisconsin

- Date: October 14
- Game time: 8:15 p.m. EDT/7:15 p.m. CDT
- Game weather: Cloudy, 43 °F (6 °C)
- Game attendance: 76,947
- Referee: Clete Blakeman
- TV announcers (ESPN): Joe Tessitore, Booger McFarland, Lisa Salters and John Parry
- Recap, Game Book

Game information

**First quarter**

- DET – Matt Prater 26-yard field goal, 12:41. Lions 3–0. **Drive: 5 plays, 69 yards, 2:19.**
- DET – Kerryon Johnson 1-yard run (Matt Prater kick), 6:35. Lions 10–0. **Drive: 8 plays, 74 yards, 4:37.**

**Second quarter**

- DET – Matt Prater 22-yard field goal, 13:28. Lions 13–0. **Drive: 11 plays, 64 yards, 5:02.**
- GB – Jamaal Williams 5-yard pass from Aaron Rodgers (Mason Crosby kick), 7:31. Lions 13–7. **Drive: 14 plays, 60 yards, 5:57.**
- GB – Mason Crosby 37-yard field goal, 0:07. Lions 13–10. **Drive: 13 plays, 75 yards, 4:27.**

**Third quarter**

- GB – Mason Crosby 48-yard field goal, 12:35. Tied 13–13. **Drive: 5 plays, 48 yards, 2:25.**
- DET – Matt Prater 41-yard field goal, 9:01. Lions 16–13. **Drive: 4 plays, 2 yards, 0:58.**
- DET – Matt Prater 51-yard field goal, 3:27. Lions 19–13. **Drive: 7 plays, 34 yards, 3:06.**

**Fourth quarter**

- DET – Matt Prater 54-yard field goal, 12:17. Lions 22–13. **Drive: 4 plays, 8 yards, 0:52.**
- GB – Allen Lazard 35-yard pass from Aaron Rodgers (Mason Crosby kick), 9:03. Lions 22–20. **Drive: 7 plays, 79 yards, 3:14.**
- GB – Mason Crosby 23-yard field goal, 0:00. Packers 23–22. **Drive: 14 plays, 77 yards, 6:46.**

**Top passers**

- DET – Matthew Stafford – 18/32, 265 yards
- GB – Aaron Rodgers – 24/39, 283 yards, 2 TD, INT

**Top rushers**

- DET – Kerryon Johnson – 13 rushes, 34 yards, TD
- GB – Jamaal Williams – 14 rushes, 104 yards

**Top receivers**

- DET – Kenny Golladay – 5 receptions, 121 yards
- GB – Allen Lazard – 4 receptions, 65 yards, TD

After their bye week, for week 6, the Lions visited their divisional rival, the Green Bay Packers, on Monday Night Football. The Lions scored 10 points in the first quarter via a 26-yard field goal by Matt Prater and a one-yard touchdown run from Kerryon Johnson, and extended their lead in the second quarter via a 22-yard field goal by Prater. The Packers responded with 10 points via a five-yard touchdown pass from Aaron Rodgers to Jamaal Williams and a 37-yard field goal by Mason Crosby, making the score 13–10 in favor of Detroit at half-time. The Packers opened the scoring in the third quarter via a 48-yard field goal by Crosby to tie the game. The Lions responded with two field goals by Prater, from 41 and 51 yards to regain the lead. The Lions extended their lead in the fourth quarter via a 54-yard field goal by Prater. The Packers responded with 10 points via a 35-yard touchdown pass from Rodgers to Allen Lazard, and a 23-yard field goal by Crosby as time expired, making the final score 23–22 in favor of Green Bay.

==== Week 7: vs. Minnesota Vikings ====
Week Seven: Minnesota Vikings at Detroit Lions – Game summary

Quarter	1	2	3	4	Total
**Vikings**	7	14	7	14	**42**
Lions	14	7	3	6	**30**

at Ford Field, Detroit, Michigan

- Date: October 20
- Game time: 1:00 p.m. EDT
- Game weather: None (indoor stadium)
- Game attendance: 60,314
- Referee: Brad Rogers
- TV announcers (Fox): Brandon Gaudin, Chris Spielman and Shannon Spake
- Recap, Game Book

Game information

**First quarter**

- DET – Marvin Jones 16-yard pass from Matthew Stafford (Matt Prater kick), 7:34. Lions 7–0. **Drive: 7 plays, 77 yards, 3:03.**
- MIN – Adam Thielen 25-yard pass from Kirk Cousins (Dan Bailey kick), 5:14. Tied 7–7. **Drive: 5 plays, 73 yards, 2:20.**
- DET – Marvin Jones 3-yard pass from Matthew Stafford (Matt Prater kick), 0:13. Lions 14–7. **Drive: 9 plays, 75 yards, 5:01.**

**Second quarter**

- MIN – Bisi Johnson 1-yard pass from Kirk Cousins (Dan Bailey kick), 12:39. Tied 14–14. **Drive: 8 plays, 61 yards, 2:34.**
- MIN – Dalvin Cook 8-yard run (Dan Bailey kick), 3:26. Vikings 21–14. **Drive: 15 plays, 97 yards, 7:19.**
- DET – Marvin Jones 10-yard pass from Matthew Stafford (Matt Prater kick), 0:02. Tied 21–21. **Drive: 11 plays, 75 yards, 3:24.**

**Third quarter**

- MIN – C. J. Ham 5-yard pass from Kirk Cousins (Dan Bailey kick), 9:02. Vikings 28–21. **Drive: 12 plays, 75 yards, 5:58.**
- DET – Matt Prater 46-yard field goal, 3:22. Vikings 28–24. **Drive: 7 plays, 60 yards, 3:01.**

**Fourth quarter**

- MIN – Kyle Rudolph 15-yard pass from Kirk Cousins (Dan Bailey kick), 5:40. Vikings 35–24. **Drive: 6 plays, 59 yards, 3:12.**
- DET – Marvin Jones 2-yard pass from Matthew Stafford (pass failed), 3:05. Vikings 35–30. **Drive: 10 plays, 75 yards, 2:35.**
- MIN – Dalvin Cook 4-yard run (Dan Bailey kick), 1:55. Vikings 42–30. **Drive: 4 plays, 75 yards, 1:10.**

**Top passers**

- MIN – Kirk Cousins – 24/34, 337 yards, 4 TD
- DET – Matthew Stafford – 30/45, 364 yards, 4 TD, INT

**Top rushers**

- MIN – Dalvin Cook – 25 rushes, 142 yards, 2 TD
- DET – J. D. McKissic – 5 rushes, 29 yards

**Top receivers**

- MIN – Stefon Diggs – 7 receptions, 142 yards
- DET – Danny Amendola – 8 receptions, 105 yards

In week 7, the Lions hosted another divisional rival, the Minnesota Vikings. The Lions scored 14 points in the first quarter via two touchdown passes from Matthew Stafford to Marvin Jones from 16-yards, and three-yards, respectively. The Vikings responded with a 25-yard touchdown pass from Kirk Cousins to Adam Thielen. The Vikings scored 14 points in the second quarter via a one-yard touchdown pass from Cousins to Bisi Johnson and an eight-yard touchdown run from Dalvin Cook to take their first lead of the game. The Lions responded with a 10-yard touchdown pass from Stafford to Jones, tying the score at 21–21 at halftime. Minnesota regained the lead in the third quarter via a five-yard touchdown pass from Cousins to C. J. Ham. The Lions responded with a 46-yard field goal by Matt Prater. The Vikings scored 14 points in the fourth quarter via a 15-yard touchdown pass from Cousins to Kyle Rudolph and a four-yard touchdown run from Cook. The Lions responded with a two-yard touchdown pass from Stafford to Jones, making the final score 42–30 in favor of Minnesota, for Detroit's third consecutive loss. Jones became the first Lions player with four touchdown receptions in a game since Cloyce Box did so against the Baltimore Colts in 1950. Stafford became the fastest quarterback to throw for 40,000 yards, reaching the milestone in 147 games.

==== Week 8: vs. New York Giants ====
Week Eight: New York Giants at Detroit Lions – Game summary

Quarter	1	2	3	4	Total
Giants	0	13	6	7	**26**
**Lions**	14	3	7	7	**31**

at Ford Field, Detroit, Michigan

- Date: October 27
- Game time: 1:00 p.m. EDT
- Game weather: None (indoor stadium)
- Game attendance: 58,509
- Referee: Scott Novak
- TV announcers (Fox): Kenny Albert, Charles Davis and Pam Oliver
- Recap, Game Book

Game information

**First quarter**

- DET – Devon Kennard 13-yard fumble return (Matt Prater kick), 7:12. Lions 7–0.
- DET – Marvin Hall 49-yard pass from Matthew Stafford (Matt Prater kick), 2:31. Lions 14–0. **Drive: 6 plays, 71 yards, 3:01.**

**Second quarter**

- NYG – Darius Slayton 22-yard pass from Daniel Jones (Aldrick Rosas kick), 12:27. Lions 14–7. **Drive: 10 plays, 88 yards, 5:04.**
- NYG – Darius Slayton 28-yard pass from Daniel Jones (kick failed), 4:39. Lions 14–13. **Drive: 8 plays, 57 yards, 3:30.**
- DET – Matt Prater 52-yard field goal, 0:20. Lions 17–13. **Drive: 14 plays, 41 yards, 4:19.**

**Third quarter**

- DET – Kenny Golladay 9-yard pass from Matthew Stafford (Matt Prater kick), 9:51. Lions 24–13. **Drive: 10 plays, 75 yards, 5:09.**
- NYG – Evan Engram 2-yard pass from Daniel Jones (pass failed), 4:54. Lions 24–19. **Drive: 10 plays, 78 yards, 4:57.**

**Fourth quarter**

- DET – Kenny Golladay 41-yard pass from Matthew Stafford (Matt Prater kick), 12:12. Lions 31–19. **Drive: 5 plays, 80 yards, 2:34.**
- NYG – Saquon Barkley 4-yard pass from Daniel Jones (Aldrick Rosas kick), 1:19. Lions 31–26. **Drive: 4 plays, 50 yards, 1:02.**

**Top passers**

- NYG – Daniel Jones – 28/41, 322 yards, 4 TD
- DET – Matthew Stafford – 24/32, 342 yards, 3 TD, INT

**Top rushers**

- NYG – Saquon Barkley – 19 rushes, 64 yards
- DET – Tra Carson – 12 rushes, 34 yards

**Top receivers**

- NYG – Golden Tate – 8 receptions, 85 yards
- DET – Kenny Golladay – 6 receptions, 123 yards, 2 TD

In week 8, the Lions hosted the New York Giants. The Lions scored 14 points in the first quarter via a 13-yard fumble return by Devon Kennard and a 49-yard touchdown pass from Matthew Stafford to Marvin Hall. The Giants added 13 points in the second quarter via two touchdown passes from Daniel Jones to Darius Slayton, from 22-yards, and 28-yards, respectively. The Lions responded with a 52-yard field goal by Matt Prater, making the score 17–13 in favor of Detroit at half-time. The teams exchanged touchdowns in the third quarter via a nine-yard touchdown pass from Stafford to Kenny Golladay for Detroit and a two-yard touchdown pass from Jones to Evan Engram for New York. The teams exchanged touchdowns in the fourth quarter via a 41-yard touchdown pass from Stafford to Golladay for Detroit and a four-yard touchdown pass from Jones to Saquon Barkley for New York, making the final score 31–26 in favor of Detroit, snapping their three-game losing streak.

==== Week 9: at Oakland Raiders ====
Week Nine: Detroit Lions at Oakland Raiders – Game summary

Quarter	1	2	3	4	Total
Lions	7	7	3	7	**24**
**Raiders**	7	10	0	14	**31**

at RingCentral Coliseum, Oakland, California

- Date: November 3
- Game time: 4:05 p.m. EST/1:05 p.m. PST
- Game weather: Sunny, 71 °F (22 °C)
- Game attendance: 53,318
- Referee: Shawn Hochuli
- TV announcers (Fox): Thom Brennaman, Chris Spielman and Shannon Spake
- Recap, Game Book

Game information

**First quarter**

- OAK – Josh Jacobs 2-yard run (Daniel Carlson kick), 6:32. Raiders 7–0. **Drive: 11 plays, 68 yards, 5:32.**
- DET – Marvin Jones 2-yard pass from Matthew Stafford (Matt Prater kick), 2:34. Tied 7–7. **Drive: 9 plays, 75 yards, 3:58.**

**Second quarter**

- OAK – Daniel Carlson 32-yard field goal, 13:31. Raiders 10–7. **Drive: 10 plays, 50 yards, 4:03.**
- DET – Kenny Golladay 59-yard pass from Matthew Stafford (Matt Prater kick), 11:21. Lions 14–10. **Drive: 3 plays, 73 yards, 2:10.**
- OAK – Josh Jacobs 3-yard run (Daniel Carlson kick), 1:12. Raiders 17–14. **Drive: 11 plays, 80 yards, 5:14.**

**Third quarter**

- DET – Matt Prater 23-yard field goal, 4:45. Tied 17–17. **Drive: 11 plays, 60 yards, 6:07.**

**Fourth quarter**

- OAK – Foster Moreau 3-yard pass from Derek Carr (Daniel Carlson kick), 14:52. Raiders 24–17. **Drive: 9 plays, 80 yards, 4:53.**
- DET – J. D. McKissic 26-yard pass from Matthew Stafford (Matt Prater kick), 5:16. Tied 24–24. **Drive: 5 plays, 63 yards, 2:26.**
- OAK – Hunter Renfrow 9-yard pass from Derek Carr (Daniel Carlson kick), 2:04. Raiders 31–24. **Drive: 7 plays, 75 yards, 3:12.**

**Top passers**

- DET – Matthew Stafford – 26/41, 406 yards, 3 TD, INT
- OAK – Derek Carr – 20/31, 289 yards, 2 TD

**Top rushers**

- DET – J. D. McKissic – 4 rushes, 32 yards
- OAK – Josh Jacobs – 28 rushes, 120 yards, 2 TD

**Top receivers**

- DET – Kenny Golladay – 4 receptions, 132 yards, TD
- OAK – Jalen Richard – 3 receptions, 56 yards

In week 9, the Lions visited the Oakland Raiders. The teams exchanged touchdowns in the first quarter via a two-yard touchdown run from Josh Jacobs for the Raiders and a two-yard touchdown pass from Matthew Stafford to Marvin Jones for the Lions. The Raiders regained the lead in the second quarter via a 32-yard field goal by Daniel Carlson. The Lions responded with a 59-yard touchdown pass from Stafford to Kenny Golladay to take their first lead of the game. The Raiders responded with a three-yard touchdown run from Jacobs, making the score 17–14 in favor of Oakland at half-time. The Lions scored the only points of the third quarter via a 23-yard field goal by Matt Prater to tie the game. The teams exchanged touchdowns in the fourth quarter via a three-yard touchdown pass from Derek Carr to Foster Moreau for the Raiders and a 26-yard touchdown pass from Stafford to J. D. McKissic for the Lions. The Raiders scored the final points of the game via a nine-yard touchdown pass from Carr to Hunter Renfrow, making the final score 31–24 in favor of Oakland. The Lions' attempt to tie the game fell short when they moved the ball to the Oakland 1-yard line with eight seconds on the clock, but were unable to score on the final play of the game.

==== Week 10: at Chicago Bears ====
Week Ten: Detroit Lions at Chicago Bears – Game summary

Quarter	1	2	3	4	Total
Lions	3	3	0	7	**13**
**Bears**	0	7	13	0	**20**

at Soldier Field, Chicago, Illinois

- Date: November 10
- Game time: 1:00 p.m. EST/12:00 p.m. CST
- Game weather: Overcast, 40 °F (4 °C)
- Game attendance: 61,758
- Referee: Carl Cheffers
- TV announcers (CBS): Ian Eagle, Dan Fouts and Evan Washburn
- Recap, Game Book

Game information

**First quarter**

- DET – Matt Prater 22-yard field goal, 8:42. Lions 3–0. **Drive: 13 plays, 72 yards, 6:18.**

**Second quarter**

- DET – Matt Prater 54-yard field goal, 4:40. Lions 6–0. **Drive: 7 plays, 13 yards, 2:54.**
- CHI – Ben Braunecker 18-yard pass from Mitchell Trubisky (Eddy Piñeiro kick), 0:25. Bears 7–6. **Drive: 10 plays, 80 yards, 4:15.**

**Third quarter**

- CHI – Tarik Cohen 9-yard pass from Mitchell Trubisky (kick failed, wide right), 12:25. Bears 13–6. **Drive: 5 plays, 76 yards, 2:35.**
- CHI – Taylor Gabriel 24-yard pass from Mitchell Trubisky (Eddy Piñeiro kick), 9:38. Bears 20–6. **Drive: 3 plays, 25 yards, 1:20.**

**Fourth quarter**

- DET – Kenny Golladay 47-yard pass from Jeff Driskel (Matt Prater kick), 5:53. Bears 20–13. **Drive: 4 plays, 81 yards, 1:23.**

**Top passers**

- DET – Jeff Driskel – 27/46, 269 yards, TD, INT
- CHI – Mitchell Trubisky – 16/23, 173 yards, 3 TD

**Top rushers**

- DET – Jeff Driskel – 5 rushes, 37 yards
- CHI – David Montgomery – 17 rushes, 60 yards

**Top receivers**

- DET – Marvin Jones – 5 receptions, 77 yards
- CHI – Allen Robinson – 6 receptions, 86 yards

In week 10, the Lions visited their divisional rival, the Chicago Bears. The Lions opened the scoring in the first quarter via a 23-yard field goal by Matt Prater and extended their lead in the second quarter via a 54-yard field goal by Prater. The Bears responded with an 18-yard touchdown pass from Mitchell Trubisky to Ben Braunecker, making the score 7–6 in favor of Chicago at half-time. The Bears added 13 points in the third quarter via a 9-yard touchdown pass from Trubisky to Tarik Cohen and a 24-yard touchdown pass from Trubisky to Taylor Gabriel. The Lions scored the only points of the fourth quarter via a 47-yard touchdown pass from Jeff Driskel to Kenny Golladay, making the final score 20–13 in favor of Chicago. Due to a back injury the previous week, this was the first regular season game Matthew Stafford missed since the 2010 season, ending his streak of 136 consecutive games played.

==== Week 11: vs. Dallas Cowboys ====
Week Eleven: Dallas Cowboys at Detroit Lions – Game summary

Quarter	1	2	3	4	Total
**Cowboys**	3	21	3	8	**35**
Lions	7	7	7	6	**27**

at Ford Field, Detroit, Michigan

- Date: November 17
- Game time: 1:00 p.m. EST
- Game weather: None (indoor stadium)
- Game attendance: 61,801
- Referee: Tony Corrente
- TV announcers (Fox): Kevin Burkhardt, Charles Davis and Pam Oliver
- Recap, Game Book

Game information

**First quarter**

- DET – Bo Scarbrough 5-yard run (Matt Prater kick), 12:33. Lions 7–0. **Drive: 5 plays, 28 yards, 2:16.**
- DAL – Brett Maher 30-yard field goal, 2:18. Lions 7–3. **Drive: 14 plays, 74 yards, 7:31.**

**Second quarter**

- DAL – Tony Pollard 21-yard pass from Dak Prescott (Brett Maher kick), 14:10. Cowboys 10–7. **Drive: 7 plays, 70 yards, 2:11.**
- DET – Jeff Driskel 2-yard run (Matt Prater kick), 7:46. Lions 14–10. **Drive: 6 plays, 45 yards, 3:17.**
- DAL – Ezekiel Elliott 1-yard run (Brett Maher kick), 4:37. Cowboys 17–14. **Drive: 7 plays, 75 yards, 3:09.**
- DAL – Randall Cobb 19-yard pass from Dak Prescott (Brett Maher kick), 0:27. Cowboys 24–14. **Drive: 4 plays, 83 yards, 1:21.**

**Third quarter**

- DET – Marvin Jones 11-yard pass from Jeff Driskel (Matt Prater kick), 9:15. Cowboys 24–21. **Drive: 10 plays, 75 yards, 5:45.**
- DAL – Brett Maher 34-yard field goal, 5:00. Cowboys 27–21. **Drive: 10 plays, 59 yards, 4:15.**

**Fourth quarter**

- DAL – Ezekiel Elliott 17-yard pass from Dak Prescott (Tony Pollard run), 7:56. Cowboys 35–21. **Drive: 11 plays, 84 yards, 5:41.**
- DET – Marvin Jones 25-yard pass from Jeff Driskel (two-point conversion pass failed), 5:49. Cowboys 35–27. **Drive: 5 plays, 75 yards, 2:07.**

**Top passers**

- DAL – Dak Prescott – 29/46, 444 yards, 3 TD
- DET – Jeff Driskel – 15/26, 209 yards, 2 TD

**Top rushers**

- DAL – Ezekiel Elliott – 16 rushes, 45 yards, TD
- DET – Bo Scarbrough – 14 rushes, 55 yards, TD

**Top receivers**

- DAL – Michael Gallup – 9 receptions, 148 yards
- DET – Danny Amendola – 4 receptions, 47 yards

In week 11, the Lions hosted the Dallas Cowboys wearing white jerseys at a home game for the first time since 1970. The Lions opened the scoring in the first quarter via a five-yard touchdown run from Bo Scarbrough. The Cowboys responded with a 30-yard field goal by Brett Maher. The teams exchanged touchdowns in the second quarter via a 21-yard touchdown pass from Dak Prescott to Tony Pollard for the Cowboys to take their first lead of the game. The Lions responded with a two-yard touchdown run from Jeff Driskel to regain the lead. The Cowboys added 10 points via a one-yard touchdown run from Ezekiel Elliott, and a 19-yard touchdown pass from Prescott to Randall Cobb, making the score 24–14 in favor of Dallas at half-time. In the third quarter the Lions scored via an 11-yard touchdown pass from Driskel to Marvin Jones. The Cowboys responded with a 34-yard field goal by Maher. The teams exchanged touchdowns in the fourth quarter via a 17-yard touchdown pass from Prescott to Elliott, followed by a two-point conversion run from Pollard. The Lions scored the final points of the game via a 25-yard touchdown pass from Driskel to Jones, followed by a failed two-point conversion pass, making the final score 35–27 in favor of Dallas.

==== Week 12: at Washington Redskins ====
Week Twelve: Detroit Lions at Washington Redskins – Game summary

Quarter	1	2	3	4	Total
Lions	0	6	7	3	**16**
**Redskins**	3	10	0	6	**19**

at FedExField, Landover, Maryland

- Date: November 24
- Game time: 1:00 p.m. EST
- Game weather: Sunny, 46 °F (8 °C)
- Game attendance: 57,754
- Referee: Bill Vinovich
- TV announcers (Fox): Kenny Albert, Ronde Barber and Lindsay Czarniak
- Recap, Game Book

Game information

**First quarter**

- WAS – Dustin Hopkins 28-yard field goal, 2:31. Redskins 3–0. **Drive: 14 plays, 60 yards, 7:21.**

**Second quarter**

- DET – Matt Prater 24-yard field goal, 13:09. Tied 3–3. **Drive: 10 plays, 71 yards, 4:22.**
- WAS – Steven Sims 91-yard kickoff return (Dustin Hopkins kick), 12:54. Redskins 10–3. **Drive: 0 plays, 0 yards, 0:15.**
- WAS – Dustin Hopkins 37-yard field goal, 5:44. Redskins 13–3. **Drive: 7 plays, 32 yards, 4:24.**
- DET – Matt Prater 49-yard field goal, 0:14. Redskins 13–6. **Drive: 6 plays, 27 yards, 0:51.**

**Third quarter**

- DET – Logan Thomas 12-yard pass from Jeff Driskel (Matt Prater kick), 10:03. Tied 13–13. **Drive: 9 plays, 75 yards, 4:57.**

**Fourth quarter**

- DET – Matt Prater 21-yard field goal, 12:01. Lions 16–13. **Drive: 11 plays, 47 yards, 4:10.**
- WAS – Dustin Hopkins 42-yard field goal, 1:49. Tied 16–16. **Drive: 9 plays, 54 yards, 3:42.**
- WAS – Dustin Hopkins 39-yard field goal, 0:16. Redskins 19–16. **Drive: 6 plays, 33 yards, 0:32.**

**Top passers**

- DET – Jeff Driskel – 20/33, 207 yards, TD, 3 INT
- WAS – Dwayne Haskins – 13/29, 156 yards, INT

**Top rushers**

- DET – Bo Scarbrough – 18 rushes, 98 yards
- WAS – Derrius Guice – 10 rushes, 32 yards

**Top receivers**

- DET – Kenny Golladay – 4 receptions, 61 yards
- WAS – Terry McLaurin – 5 receptions, 72 yards

In week 12, the Lions visited the Washington Redskins. The Redskins opened the scoring in the first quarter via a 28-yard field goal by Dustin Hopkins. In the second quarter, the Lions responded with a 24-yard field goal by Matt Prater to tie the game. Washington responded with 10 points via a 91-yard kickoff return by Steven Sims and a 37-yard field goal by Hopkins to regain the lead. The Lions added a 49-yard field goal by Prater at the end of the first half, making the score 13–6 in favor of Washington at half-time. The Lions scored the only points of the third quarter via a 12-yard touchdown pass from Jeff Driskel to Logan Thomas to tie the game. In the fourth quarter the Lions scored via a 21-yard field goal by Prater, to take their first and only lead of the game. The Redskins responded with two field goals by Hopkins, from 42-yards, and 39-yards, respectively, making the final score 19–16 in favor of Washington, for Detroit's fourth consecutive loss.

==== Week 13: vs. Chicago Bears ====
Week Thirteen: Chicago Bears at Detroit Lions – Game summary

Quarter	1	2	3	4	Total
**Bears**	7	3	7	7	**24**
Lions	14	3	0	3	**20**

at Ford Field, Detroit, Michigan

- Date: November 28
- Game time: 12:30 p.m. EST
- Game weather: None (indoor stadium)
- Game attendance: 65,412
- Referee: Jerome Boger
- TV announcers (Fox): Joe Buck, Troy Aikman, Erin Andrews and Kristina Pink
- Recap, Game Book

Game information

**First quarter**

- CHI – Allen Robinson 10-yard pass from Mitchell Trubisky (Eddy Piñeiro kick), 11:37. Bears 7–0. **Drive: 6 plays, 50 yards, 3:23.**
- DET – Kenny Golladay 75-yard pass from David Blough (Matt Prater kick), 11:01. Tied 7–7. **Drive: 3 plays, 75 yards, 0:36.**
- DET – Marvin Jones 8-yard pass from David Blough (Matt Prater kick), 4:12. Lions 14–7. **Drive: 10 plays, 78 yards, 5:14.**

**Second quarter**

- DET – Matt Prater 25-yard field goal, 3:10. Lions 17–7. **Drive: 11 plays, 61 yards, 4:59.**
- CHI – Eddy Piñeiro 30-yard field goal, 0:22. Lions 17–10. **Drive: 9 plays, 52 yards, 2:48.**

**Third quarter**

- CHI – Jesper Horsted 18-yard pass from Mitchell Trubisky (Eddy Piñeiro kick), 4:44. Tied 17–17. **Drive: 9 plays, 80 yards, 4:34.**

**Fourth quarter**

- DET – Matt Prater 24-yard field goal, 10:47. Lions 20–17. **Drive: 15 plays, 70 yards, 8:57.**
- CHI – David Montgomery 3-yard pass from Mitchell Trubisky (Eddy Piñeiro kick), 2:17. Bears 24–20. **Drive: 9 plays, 90 yards, 4:23.**

**Top passers**

- CHI – Mitchell Trubisky – 29/38, 338 yards, 3 TD, INT
- DET – David Blough – 22/38, 280 yards, 2 TD, INT

**Top rushers**

- CHI – David Montgomery – 16 rushes, 75 yards
- DET – Bo Scarbrough – 21 rushes, 83 yards

**Top receivers**

- CHI – Anthony Miller – 9 receptions, 140 yards
- DET – Kenny Golladay – 4 receptions, 158 yards, TD

In week 13, the Lions hosted a rematch with their divisional rival, the Chicago Bears, in their annual Thanksgiving Day game. The Bears opened the scoring in the first quarter via a 10-yard touchdown pass from Mitchell Trubisky to Allen Robinson. The Lions responded with 14 points when third-string quarterback David Blough, in his NFL debut, threw two touchdown passes, one from 75-yards out to Kenny Golladay and one from eight-yards out to Marvin Jones. Both teams kicked field goals in the second quarter, first Detroit's Matt Prater from 25-yards, then Chicago's Eddy Piñeiro from 30-yards, making the score 17–10 in favor of Detroit at half-time. The Bears scored the only points of the third quarter via an 18-yard touchdown pass from Trubisky to Jesper Horsted to tie the game at 17 points each. In the fourth quarter, the Lions responded with a 24-yard field goal by Prater to regain the lead. The Bears took their first lead of the game via a three-yard touchdown pass from Trubisky to David Montgomery. Detroit's attempted comeback failed when Robinson intercepted a pass from Blough in the final seconds, making the final score 24–20 in favor of Chicago, for Detroit's fifth consecutive loss. Also with the loss, the Lions would be eliminated from playoff contention.

==== Week 14: at Minnesota Vikings ====
Week Fourteen: Detroit Lions at Minnesota Vikings – Game summary

Quarter	1	2	3	4	Total
Lions	0	0	0	7	**7**
**Vikings**	7	10	0	3	**20**

at U.S. Bank Stadium, Minneapolis, Minnesota

- Date: December 8
- Game time: 1:00 p.m. EST/12:00 p.m. CST
- Game weather: None (indoor stadium)
- Game attendance: 66,776
- Referee: Walt Anderson
- TV announcers (Fox): Thom Brennaman, Chris Spielman and Shannon Spake
- Recap, Game Book

Game information

**First quarter**

- MIN – Bisi Johnson 9-yard pass from Kirk Cousins (Dan Bailey kick), 5:47. Vikings 7–0. **Drive: 10 plays, 82 yards, 4:40.**

**Second quarter**

- MIN – Dan Bailey 27-yard field goal, 4:42. Vikings 10–0. **Drive: 9 plays, 56 yards, 5:12.**
- MIN – Dalvin Cook 3-yard run (Dan Bailey kick), 0:20. Vikings 17–0. **Drive: 6 plays, 65 yards, 0:46.**

**Third quarter**

- No scoring plays.

**Fourth quarter**

- MIN – Dan Bailey 50-yard field goal, 14:55. Vikings 20–0. **Drive: 9 plays, 32 yards, 4:29.**
- DET – Kenny Golladay 10-yard pass from David Blough (Matt Prater kick), 2:09. Vikings 20–7. **Drive: 12 plays, 75 yards, 3:30.**

**Top passers**

- DET – David Blough – 24/40, 205 yards, TD, 2 INT
- MIN – Kirk Cousins – 24/30, 242 yards, TD

**Top rushers**

- DET – Bo Scarbrough – 19 rushes, 65 yards
- MIN – Dalvin Cook – 18 rushes, 62 yards, TD

**Top receivers**

- DET – Kenny Golladay – 6 receptions, 58 yards, TD
- MIN – Stefon Diggs – 6 receptions, 92 yards

In week 14, the Lions visited their divisional rival the Minnesota Vikings, for a rematch of week 7. The Vikings opened the scoring in the first quarter via a nine-yard touchdown pass from Kirk Cousins to Bisi Johnson. The Vikings added 10 points in the second quarter via a 27-yard field goal by Dan Bailey and a three-yard touchdown run from Dalvin Cook, making the score 17–0 in favor of Minnesota at half-time. After a scoreless third quarter, the Vikings extended their lead in the fourth quarter via a 50-yard field goal by Bailey. The Lions finally got on the board late in the fourth quarter via a 10-yard touchdown pass from David Blough to Kenny Golladay, making the final score 20–7 in favor of Minnesota, for Detroit's sixth consecutive loss.

==== Week 15: vs. Tampa Bay Buccaneers ====
Week 15: Tampa Bay Buccaneers at Detroit Lions – Game summary

Quarter	1	2	3	4	Total
**Buccaneers**	14	7	3	14	**38**
Lions	0	3	7	7	**17**

at Ford Field, Detroit, Michigan

- Date: December 15
- Game time: 1:00 p.m. EST
- Game weather: None (indoor stadium)
- Game attendance: 56,515
- Referee: Adrian Hill
- TV announcers (Fox): Dick Stockton, Mark Schlereth and Jennifer Hale
- Recap, Game Book

Game information

**First quarter**

- TB – Breshad Perriman 34-yard pass from Jameis Winston (Matt Gay kick), 7:25. Buccaneers 7–0. **Drive: 8 plays, 79 yards, 4:19.**
- TB – Scott Miller 33-yard pass from Jameis Winston (Matt Gay kick), 3:42. Buccaneers 14–0. **Drive: 5 plays, 99 yards, 1:52.**

**Second quarter**

- TB – Breshad Perriman 25-yard pass from Jameis Winston (Matt Gay kick), 8:13. Buccaneers 21–0. **Drive: 9 plays, 67 yards, 4:27.**
- DET – Matt Prater 44-yard field goal, 3:17. Buccaneers 21–3. **Drive: 11 plays, 49 yards, 4:56.**

**Third quarter**

- TB – Matt Gay 46-yard field goal, 11:32. Buccaneers 24–3. **Drive: 5 plays, 39 yards, 1:29.**
- DET – Wes Hills 1-yard run (Matt Prater kick), 6:45. Buccaneers 24–10. **Drive: 11 plays, 75 yards, 4:47.**

**Fourth quarter**

- DET – Wes Hills 1-yard run (Matt Prater kick), 14:57. Buccaneers 24–17. **Drive: 7 plays, 87 yards, 2:57.**
- TB – Sean Murphy-Bunting 70-yard interception return (Matt Gay kick), 5:12. Buccaneers 31–17.
- TB – Breshad Perriman 25-yard pass from Jameis Winston (Matt Gay kick), 2:59. Buccaneers 38–17. **Drive: 5 plays, 46 yards, 1:05.**

**Top passers**

- TB – Jameis Winston – 28/32, 458 yards, 4 TD, INT
- DET – David Blough – 24/43, 260 yards, 2 INT

**Top rushers**

- TB – Ronald Jones – 11 rushes, 23 yards
- DET – Wes Hills – 10 rushes, 21 yards, 2 TD

**Top receivers**

- TB – Chris Godwin – 5 receptions, 121 yards
- DET – Danny Amendola – 8 receptions, 102 yards

In week 15, the Lions hosted the Tampa Bay Buccaneers. The Buccaneers scored 14 points in the first quarter via a 34-yard touchdown pass from Jameis Winston to Breshad Perriman and a 33-yard touchdown pass from Winston to Scott Miller. The Buccaneers extended their lead in the second quarter via a 25-yard touchdown pass from Winston to Perriman. The Lions finally got on the board via a 44-yard field goal by Matt Prater, making the score 21–3 in favor of Tampa Bay at half-time. In the third quarter the Buccaneers added a 46-yard field goal by Matt Gay. The Lions responded with a one-yard touchdown run from Wes Hills. In the fourth quarter the Lions added a one-yard touchdown run from Hills, reducing the Buccaneers lead to seven points. The Lions attempted comeback failed when David Blough's pass was intercepted by Sean Murphy-Bunting and returned 70-yards for a touchdown. The Buccaneers extended their lead via a 25-yard touchdown pass from Winston to Perriman, making the final score 38–17 in favor of Tampa Bay, for Detroit's seventh consecutive loss.

==== Week 16: at Denver Broncos ====
Week Sixteen: Detroit Lions at Denver Broncos – Game summary

Quarter	1	2	3	4	Total
Lions	3	7	7	0	**17**
**Broncos**	0	10	3	14	**27**

at Empower Field at Mile High, Denver, Colorado

- Date: December 22
- Game time: 4:05 p.m. EST/2:05 p.m. MST
- Game weather: Mostly cloudy, 67 °F (19 °C)
- Game attendance: 74,115
- Referee: Craig Wrolstad
- TV announcers (CBS): Kevin Harlan, Rich Gannon and Jay Feely
- Recap, Game Book

Game information

**First quarter**

- DET – Matt Prater 26-yard field goal, 8:59. Lions 3–0. **Drive: 11 plays, 68 yards, 6:01.**

**Second quarter**

- DET – Jamal Agnew 64-yard punt return (Matt Prater kick), 10:52. Lions 10–0.
- DEN – Royce Freeman 1-yard run (Brandon McManus kick), 6:04. Lions 10–7. **Drive: 9 plays, 75 yards, 4:48.**
- DEN – Brandon McManus 34-yard field goal, 0:25. Tied 10–10. **Drive: 11 plays, 57 yards, 4:40.**

**Third quarter**

- DEN – Brandon McManus 26-yard field goal, 10:23. Broncos 13–10. **Drive: 11 plays, 45 yards, 4:37.**
- DET – Kenny Golladay 3-yard pass from David Blough (Matt Prater kick), 3:51. Lions 17–13. **Drive: 11 plays, 75 yards, 6:32.**

**Fourth quarter**

- DEN – DaeSean Hamilton 3-yard pass from Drew Lock (Brandon McManus kick), 13:08. Broncos 20–17. **Drive: 11 plays, 75 yards, 5:43.**
- DEN – Phillip Lindsay 27-yard run (Brandon McManus kick), 6:39. Broncos 27–17. **Drive: 7 plays, 61 yards, 4:17.**

**Top passers**

- DET – David Blough – 12/24, 117 yards, TD
- DEN – Drew Lock – 25/33, 192 yards, TD

**Top rushers**

- DET – Kerryon Johnson – 10 rushes, 42 yards
- DEN – Phillip Lindsay – 19 rushes, 109 yards

**Top receivers**

- DET – Kenny Golladay – 6 receptions, 66 yards
- DEN – DaeSean Hamilton – 6 receptions, 65 yards, TD

In week 16, the Lions visited the Denver Broncos. The Lions opened the scoring in the first quarter via a 26-yard field goal by Matt Prater. In the second quarter the Lions extended their lead via a 64-yard punt return by Jamal Agnew. The Broncos responded with 10 points via a one-yard touchdown run from Royce Freeman and a 34-yard field goal by Brandon McManus, tying the score at 10–10 at halftime. In the third quarter the Broncos took their first lead of the game via a 26-yard field goal by McManus. The Lions responded with a three-yard touchdown pass from David Blough to Kenny Golladay to regain the lead. The Broncos scored 14 points in the fourth quarter via a three-yard touchdown pass from Drew Lock to DaeSean Hamilton and a 27-yard touchdown run from Phillip Lindsay, making the final score 27–17 in favor of Denver, for Detroit's eighth consecutive loss.

==== Week 17: vs. Green Bay Packers ====
Week Seventeen: Green Bay Packers at Detroit Lions – Game summary

Quarter	1	2	3	4	Total
**Packers**	0	3	7	13	**23**
Lions	7	10	0	3	**20**

at Ford Field, Detroit, Michigan

- Date: December 29
- Game time: 1:00 p.m. EST
- Game weather: None (indoor stadium)
- Game attendance: 62,840
- Referee: Shawn Hochuli
- TV announcers (Fox): Kevin Burkhardt, Charles Davis and Pam Oliver
- Recap, Game Book

Game information

**First quarter**

- DET – David Blough 19-yard pass from Danny Amendola (Matt Prater kick), 7:59. Lions 7–0. **Drive: 8 plays, 73 yards, 4:14.**

**Second quarter**

- DET – Kerryon Johnson 1-yard run (Matt Prater kick), 3:13. Lions 14–0. **Drive: 11 plays, 80 yards, 5:52.**
- GB – Mason Crosby 32-yard field goal, 0:20. Lions 14–3. **Drive: 10 plays, 76 yards, 2:53.**
- DET – Matt Prater 42-yard field goal, 0:00. Lions 17–3. **Drive: 4 plays, 51 yards, 0:20.**

**Third quarter**

- GB – Davante Adams 20-yard pass from Aaron Rodgers (Mason Crosby kick), 3:10. Lions 17–10. **Drive: 12 plays, 95 yards, 5:50.**

**Fourth quarter**

- GB – Mason Crosby 40-yard field goal, 12:07. Lions 17–13. **Drive: 12 plays, 51 yards, 4:32.**
- DET – Matt Prater 56-yard field goal, 11:08. Lions 20–13. **Drive: 4 plays, 38 yards, 0:59.**
- GB – Allen Lazard 28-yard pass from Aaron Rodgers (Mason Crosby kick), 5:19. Tied 20–20. **Drive: 7 plays, 40 yards, 2:33.**
- GB – Mason Crosby 33-yard field goal, 0:00. Packers 23–20. **Drive: 8 plays, 68 yards, 1:20.**

**Top passers**

- GB – Aaron Rodgers – 27/55, 323 yards, 2 TD, INT
- DET – David Blough – 12/29, 122 yards, INT

**Top rushers**

- GB – Aaron Jones – 25 rushes, 100 yards
- DET – Ty Johnson – 3 rushes, 65 yards

**Top receivers**

- GB – Davante Adams – 7 receptions, 95 yards, TD
- DET – Kenny Golladay – 3 receptions, 72 yards

To end the season, the Lions hosted a rematch with their divisional rival, the Green Bay Packers. The Lions opened the scoring in the first quarter via a 19-yard pass from Danny Amendola to David Blough. The Lions extended their lead in the second quarter via a one-yard touchdown run from Kerryon Johnson. The Packers finally got on the board late in the first half via a 32-yard field goal by Mason Crosby. The Lions responded with a 42-yard field goal by Matt Prater as time expired, making the score 17–3 in favor of Detroit at half-time. The Packers scored the only points of the third quarter via a 20-yard touchdown pass from Aaron Rodgers to Davante Adams. The teams exchanged field goals in the fourth quarter via a 40-yard field goal by Crosby for the Packers, and a 56-yard field goal by Prater for the Lions. The Packers responded with 10 points via a 28-yard touchdown pass from Rodgers to Allen Lazard to tie the game, and a 33-yard field goal by Crosby as time expired, making the final score 23–20 in favor of Green Bay, for Detroit's ninth consecutive loss.

=== Standings ===
==== Division ====
NFC North
	W	L	T	PCT	DIV	CONF	PF	PA	STK
^{(2)} Green Bay Packers	13	3	0	.813	6–0	10–2	376	313	W5
^{(6)} Minnesota Vikings	10	6	0	.625	2–4	7–5	407	303	L2
Chicago Bears	8	8	0	.500	4–2	7–5	280	298	W1
Detroit Lions	3	12	1	.219	0–6	2–9–1	341	423	L9

==== Conference ====
NFC
#	Team	Division	W	L	T	PCT	DIV	CONF	SOS	SOV	STK
**Division leaders**
1 (Note: San Francisco finished ahead of Green Bay and New Orleans based on head-to-head sweep, claiming the No. 1 seed.)	San Francisco 49ers	West	13	3	0	.813	5–1	10–2	.504	.466	W2
2 (Note: Green Bay claimed the No. 2 seed over New Orleans based on conference record.)	Green Bay Packers	North	13	3	0	.813	6–0	10–2	.453	.428	W5
3	New Orleans Saints	South	13	3	0	.813	5–1	9–3	.486	.459	W3
4	Philadelphia Eagles	East	9	7	0	.563	5–1	7–5	.455	.417	W4
**Wild Cards**
5	Seattle Seahawks	West	11	5	0	.688	3–3	8–4	.531	.463	L2
6	Minnesota Vikings	North	10	6	0	.625	2–4	7–5	.477	.356	L2
**Did not qualify for the postseason**
7	Los Angeles Rams	West	9	7	0	.563	3–3	7–5	.535	.438	W1
8 (Note: Chicago finished ahead of Dallas based on head-to-head victory.)	Chicago Bears	North	8	8	0	.500	4–2	7–5	.508	.383	W1
9	Dallas Cowboys	East	8	8	0	.500	5–1	7–5	.479	.316	W1
10 (Note: Atlanta finished ahead of Tampa Bay based on division record.)	Atlanta Falcons	South	7	9	0	.438	4–2	6–6	.545	.518	W4
11	Tampa Bay Buccaneers	South	7	9	0	.438	2–4	5–7	.500	.384	L2
12	Arizona Cardinals	West	5	10	1	.344	1–5	3–8–1	.529	.375	L1
13	Carolina Panthers	South	5	11	0	.313	1–5	2–10	.549	.469	L8
14	New York Giants	East	4	12	0	.250	2–4	3–9	.473	.281	L1
15	Detroit Lions	North	3	12	1	.219	0–6	2–9–1	.506	.375	L9
16	Washington Redskins	East	3	13	0	.188	0–6	2–10	.502	.281	L4
**Tiebreakers** (Note: When breaking ties for three or more teams under the NFL's rules, they are first broken within divisions, then comparing only the highest-ranked remaining team from each division.)
