= LMDC (disambiguation) =

LMDC is the abbreviation for the Lower Manhattan Development Corporation.

LMDC may also refer to:

- Lahore Medical and Dental College, Pakistan
- Lawyers Military Defense Committee, American legal organization
- Like-Minded Developing Countries, a group of developing countries
- Liqhobong Mining Development Company, which operates the Lighobong diamond mine
- Los Muertos de Cristo, Spanish punk band
- Louisville Metro Department of Corrections, corrections agency in Louisville, Kentucky, US

== See also ==
- LM/DC Tour, concert tour by Lea Michele and Darren Criss
