= Firestone =

Firestone may refer to:

- Flint or firestone
- Firestone (surname)

== Places ==
=== Liberia ===
- Firestone District, Margibi County, Liberia

=== United States ===
- Firestone (Phoenix, Arizona), a listing on the National Register of Historic Places in Phoenix, Arizona
- Firestone, Colorado, a town in Weld County, Colorado

== Companies ==
- Firestone Building Products, headquarters in Indianapolis, Indiana, US
- Firestone Diamond Mining, Avontuur and Oena in Namaqualand, South Africa
- Firestone Employees Society, New Zealand Trade Union
- Firestone Tire and Rubber Company, an American company, a subsidiary of Bridgestone
- Firestone Vineyard, Santa Barbara, California, US
- Firestone Walker Fine Ales, Paso Robles, California, US

== Other uses ==
- Firestone station, a light rail station in Los Angeles, California, United States
- "Firestone" (song), a song by Kygo featuring Conrad Sewell

== See also ==
- Firestone Country Club, in Akron, Ohio, United States
- Firestone Fieldhouse, a multipurpose arena in Malibu, California, United States
- Firestone High School, on the northwest side of Akron, Ohio, United States
- Harvey S. Firestone Memorial Library, the main library at Princeton University, United States
- The Voice of Firestone, a weekly broadcast of classical music which appeared on the NBC radio network
- Feuerstein
