= Matt Patricia =

American football coach (born 1974)

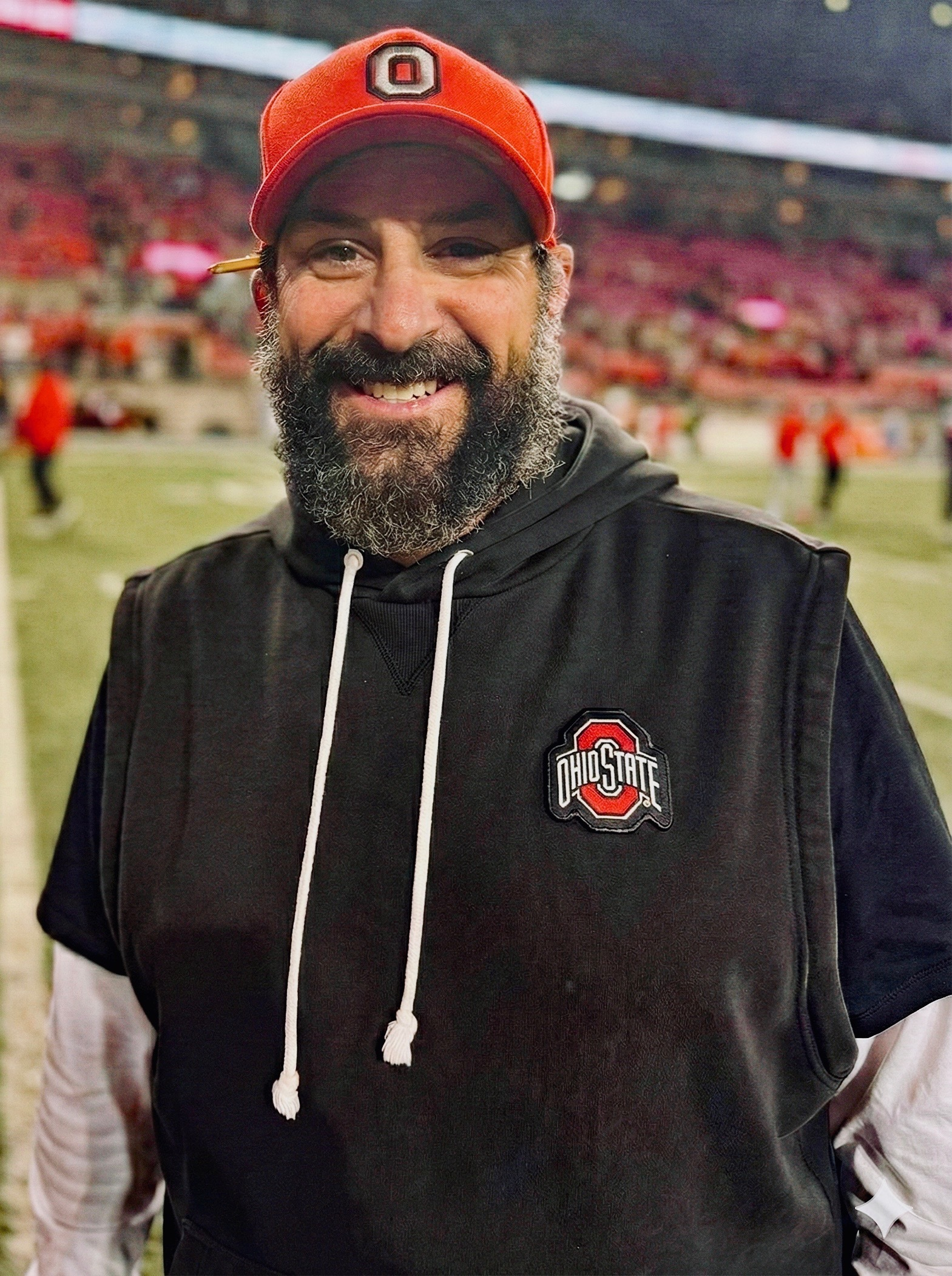
- Patricia in 2025

Current position
- Title: Defensive coordinator
- Team: Ohio State
- Conference: Big Ten

Biographical details
- Born: September 13, 1974 (age 52); Sherrill, New York, U.S.

Playing career
- 1992–1995: RPI
- Positions: Center; Guard

Coaching career (HC unless noted)
- 1996: RPI (GA)
- 1999–2000: Amherst (DL)
- 2001–2003: Syracuse (GA)
- 2004–2005: New England Patriots (assistant OL)
- 2006–2010: New England Patriots (LB)
- 2011: New England Patriots (S)
- 2012–2017: New England Patriots (DC)
- 2018–2020: Detroit Lions
- 2021: New England Patriots (senior football advisor)
- 2022: New England Patriots (senior football advisor/OL)
- 2023: Philadelphia Eagles (senior defensive assistant)
- 2025–present: Ohio State (DC)

Head coaching record
- Overall: NFL: 13–29–1

Accomplishments and honors

Championships
- 3× Super Bowl champion (XXXIX, XLIX, LI)

Matthew Edward Patricia (born September 13, 1974) is an American football coach who is the defensive coordinator for the Ohio State Buckeyes. He previously served 15 non-consecutive seasons as an assistant coach with the New England Patriots of the National Football League (NFL), including six seasons as the defensive coordinator from 2012 to 2017. During Patricia's tenure as defensive coordinator, the Patriots won two Super Bowls and allowed the fewest points in 2016. He also served as the Patriots' offensive playcaller in 2022. Outside of New England, Patricia was the head coach of the Detroit Lions from 2018 to 2020. He was named Ohio State's defensive coordinator in 2025.

== Playing career ==
Patricia attended Vernon-Verona-Sherrill High School where he played as a center on the football team. His senior year, he was named honorable mention all-league and played in the Utica-Rome all-star game for the North team. He also participated in wrestling and tennis.

Patricia played at Rensselaer Polytechnic Institute (RPI), where he was a four-year letterman as a center and guard with the Engineers football team from 1992 to 1995.

== Coaching career ==
=== Early coaching career ===
Patricia remained at RPI to begin his coaching career as a graduate assistant in 1996. He spent the next two years as an application engineer with Hoffman Air & Filtration Systems in East Syracuse, New York. After graduating, Patricia received an offer to maintain nuclear submarines and aircraft carriers with the Westinghouse Electric Company, but decided to return to football as the defensive line coach for the Amherst Mammoths from 1999 to 2000. In 2001, he moved to the Syracuse Orange as an offensive graduate assistant for the team, a position he held for three seasons.

=== New England Patriots (first stint) ===
Patricia joined the Patriots under head coach Bill Belichick as an offensive coaching assistant in 2004, the same year the team won its third Super Bowl in Super Bowl XXXIX. In 2005, upon the departure of assistant offensive line/tight ends coach Jeff Davidson, Patricia was reassigned as the Patriots' assistant offensive line coach. Then-linebackers coach Dean Pees was promoted to defensive coordinator after the season, prompting another reassignment for Patricia, this time to linebackers coach for the 2006 season. Patricia was named the team's safeties coach in 2011. In 2012, he was promoted to the title of defensive coordinator, though he had been calling the plays on defense since the departure of Pees following the 2009 season. In January 2016, the Patriots gave permission for Patricia to interview for the head-coaching position of the Cleveland Browns, but he remained with the Patriots as defensive coordinator going into the 2016 season. The Patriots won three Super Bowls with Patricia: Super Bowl XXXIX at the end of the 2004 season, Super Bowl XLIX at the end of the 2014 season, and Super Bowl LI at the end of the 2016 season. On January 1, 2018 (NFL Black Monday), it was revealed that Patricia was the subject of the Detroit Lions' and New York Giants' head coaching searches. He was the last defensive playcaller under Belichick to hold the title of defensive coordinator.

=== Detroit Lions ===
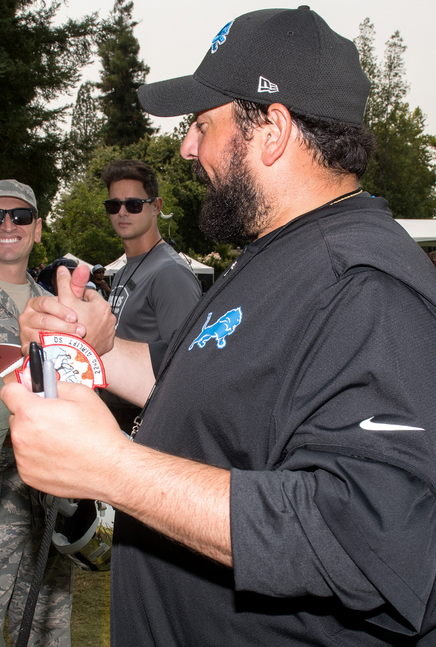
Patricia in 2018

On February 5, 2018, Patricia was named the head coach of the Detroit Lions. That May, Lions team president Rod Wood reaffirmed Patricia's hiring decision.

Patricia lost his first two games of the 2018 season, the first against the New York Jets, 48–17, on Monday Night Football on September 10, and the following week against the San Francisco 49ers, 30–27, on September 16. His first win as a head coach came on September 23, 2018, a 26–10 victory against his previous team, the New England Patriots, with Patricia beating his old mentor, Bill Belichick, in the process. It was also the Lions' first victory over the Patriots since 2000, which was Belichick's first year coaching the Patriots.

Under Patricia, the Lions posted a 6–10 record in 2018 and a 3–12–1 season in 2019. These records marked a regression from Patricia's predecessor Jim Caldwell, who posted a 9–7 record in 2017 before being fired in favor of Patricia. During Patricia's early years in Detroit, friction between him and defensive backs Darius Slay, Glover Quin, and Quandre Diggs was documented. Before Patricia's third season as Lions coach, all three had been cut or traded away. At the end of the 2019 season, Patricia was a finalist for the NFL's Salute to Service award. Team owner Martha Firestone Ford and her soon-to-be successor Sheila Ford Hamp announced after the season that they would give Patricia a chance to show improvement in the 2020 season.

On November 28, 2020, Patricia and general manager Bob Quinn were both fired by the Lions, occurring after back-to-back losses, with the team dropping to a 4–7 record. Patricia finished his tenure in Detroit with a 13–29–1 (.314) record in two and a half seasons. The Lions finished last in the NFC North division in both of Patricia's full seasons and were in last place at the time of his firing.

=== New England Patriots (second stint) ===
On January 22, 2021, it was reported that Patricia would be returning to the Patriots "in a variety of roles". The exact roles were not specified, but it was reported that Patriots head coach Bill Belichick and Patricia were working out a role similar to what Mike Lombardi had in New England, though it was still a work in progress. In addition, Patricia was expected to work on projects as well as be a resource to Belichick.

On July 21, 2022, the Patriots announced that Patricia would be the senior football advisor and offensive line coach. Throughout the 2022 season, he served as the offensive playcaller. Patricia was relieved of his duties as offensive playcaller after the season where the offense regressed to an average of 18.1 points per game, although Patricia was retained as a football advisor.

=== Philadelphia Eagles ===
On April 20, 2023, Patricia was hired as a senior defensive assistant for the Philadelphia Eagles. On December 17, head coach Nick Sirianni announced that Patricia would replace Sean Desai as defensive playcaller following consecutive losses in which the team's defense surrendered 42 and 33 points. According to The Philadelphia Inquirer, the Eagles' defense displayed "little to no improvement" under Patricia, and the team lost three of its four remaining regular season games following his appointment as defensive playcaller, culminating in a 32–9 loss to the Tampa Bay Buccaneers in the Wild Card Round. Patricia's contract with the Eagles expired at the end of the team's season.

=== Ohio State ===
On February 20, 2025, Patricia was hired as the defensive coordinator for the Ohio State Buckeyes under head coach Ryan Day. He replaced former OSU coordinator Jim Knowles, who left to become the highest-paid assistant coach in college football with Penn State. This marked a return to college football for Patricia, who last coached as an offensive graduate assistant with Syracuse University in 2003.

Through the 2025-26 season, Patricia was able to coach a dominant Buckeyes defense, leading what many considered to be the best defense in college football in the regular season. The team's defense utilized a "penny" front, a four-defensive-linemen formation with three lined up as interior linemen and one on the edge, and then one linebacker lined up on the other edge, expanding on the four-man front primarily used in the year prior. The Buckeyes defense did not allow a red zone touchdown until Week 7 at Illinois, and had multiple award winners, which includes stand-outs Caleb Downs, Arvell Reese, and Caden Curry. Block O, Ohio State’s student section, held an oversized pencil while the team was on defense, a reference to Patricia’s habit of holding a pencil behind his ear, a practice that he began very early in his career. The Buckeyes posted a 12–2 record, having lost the Cotton Bowl to the Miami Hurricanes in the College Football Playoffs, despite having only three defensive starters return from the previous season. Joe Reedy of AP News wrote that the team had exceeded expectations, and the defense under Patricia ranked first or second nationally in nine statistical categories. The Buckeyes led the nation in scoring defense (8.2 points per game), passing yards allowed (129.1 per game), red zone scores allowed (66.7%), and fewest plays of 10 or more yards allowed (90). Patricia was announced as a finalist for the Broyles Award, given to the best assistant coach in college football. He was also praised by Buckeyes players and members of the coaching staff, going on to be described as a "players' coach first" by then-OSU cornerback Aaron Scott when referring to Patricia's relationships with the players.

In February 2026, it was announced that Patricia had signed a contract extension to remain with the Buckeyes, despite receiving interest from NFL teams. Details of the contract emerged in March 2026, making Patricia the highest-paid coordinator at the time, with a salary of $3.75 million in the first year of the extension, increasing to $3.85 million in the second and third years.

== Head coaching record ==
=== NFL ===
| Team | Year | Regular season | | | | | Postseason | | | |
| Team | Year | Won | Lost | Ties | Win % | Finish | Won | Lost | Win % | Result |
|---|---|---|---|---|---|---|---|---|---|---|
| DET | 2018 | 6 | 10 | 0 | .375 | 4th in NFC North | — | — | — | — |
| DET | 2019 | 3 | 12 | 1 | .219 | 4th in NFC North | — | — | — | — |
| DET | 2020 | 4 | 7 | 0 | .364 | Fired | — | — | — | — |
| Total | | 13 | 29 | 1 | .314 | | 0 | 0 | .000 | |

== Personal life ==
He attended Vernon Verona Sherrill High School and played trumpet in the school's marching band. Patricia would play "Taps" at parades, military funerals, and ceremonies with the rest of the school band or alone on some occasions. He chose to attend the Rensselaer Polytechnic Institute because of its Reserve Officers' Training Corps program, and Patricia intended to become a pilot but had a shoulder injury while playing football for the school.

In March 1996, Patricia and another player on RPI's football team were arrested, charged and each indicted on one count of aggravated sexual assault by a Texas grand jury for an incident involving a woman in her hotel room. The men pleaded not guilty and case was dismissed at the request of the accuser after she concluded that she would not testify, according to court records.

Patricia married his wife, Raina, in 2009. They have three children together.
