= Feuerstein =

Feuerstein (German: lit., "firestone", flint) may refer to:

- Aaron Feuerstein (1925–2021), third-generation owner and CEO of Malden Mills in Lawrence, Massachusetts
- Adam Feuerstein (fl. 1990s–2020s), American columnist and journalist in the biotechnology sector
- Arthur Feuerstein (1935–2022), American chess player
- Bedřich Feuerstein (1892–1936), Czech architect, painter, and essayist
- Claire Feuerstein (born 1986), French tennis player
- Georg Feuerstein (1947–2012), German-American Indologist and leading authority on Yoga in the West
- Herbert Feuerstein (1937–2020), German comedian and entertainer
- Joshua Feuerstein (born 1981), American Internet personality and evangelist
- Mark Feuerstein (born 1971), American actor
- Familie Feuerstein, the German translation of The Flintstones
- Nathan John Feuerstein (born 1991), American rapper better known as NF
- Reuven Feuerstein (1921–2014), educator, psychologist, known for theory of Mediated Learning
- Sandra J. Feuerstein (1946–2021), American judge
- Steven Feuerstein (born 1958), author, educator, known for his work with the Oracle PL/SQL language
- Thomas Feuerstein (born 1968), Austrian artist and author
- Valentin Peter Feuerstein (1917–1999), also known as Peter Valentin Feuerstein, German painter and stained-glass artist

== See also ==
- Firestone
