= William Clay Ford Jr. =

American businessman (born 1957)

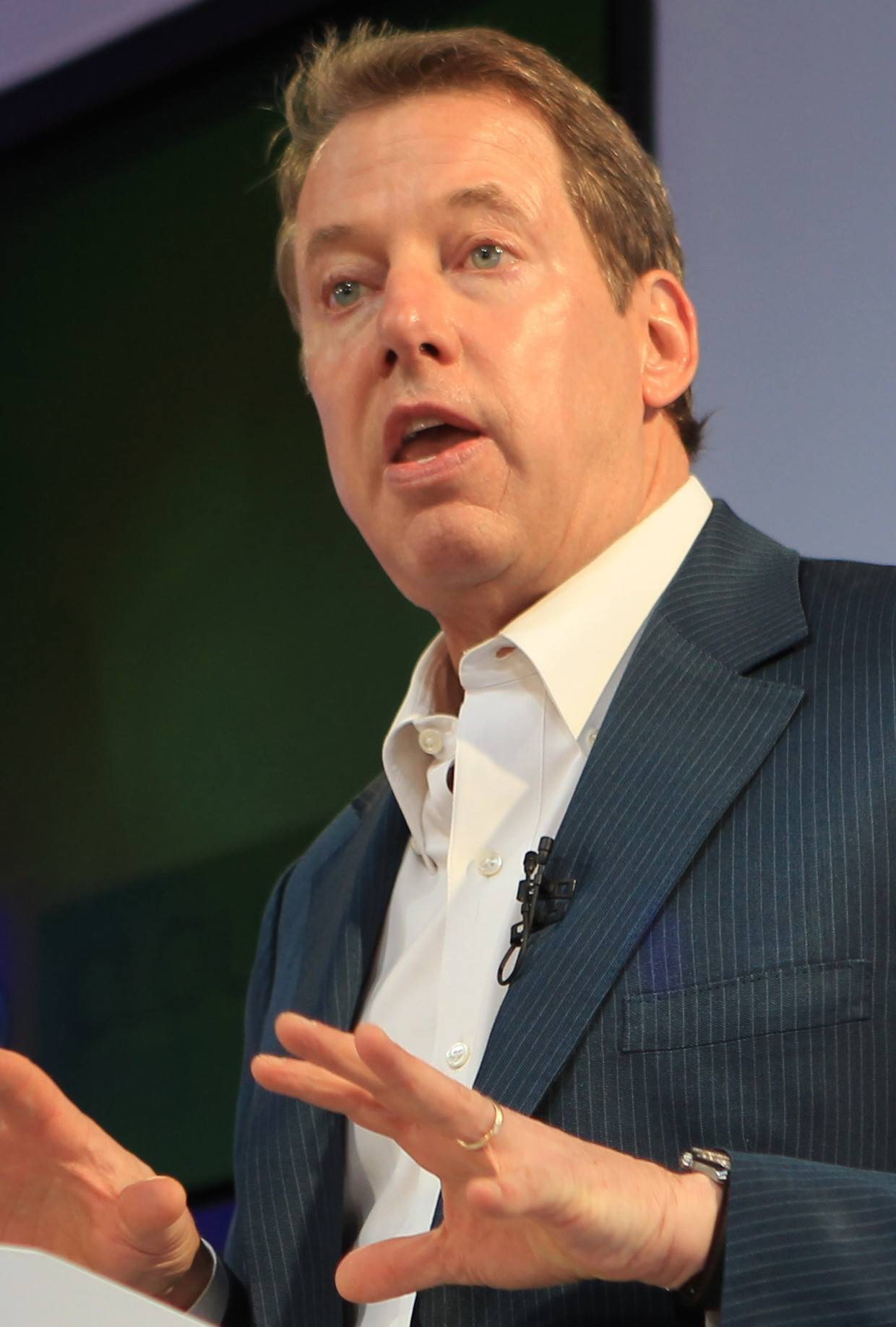
- Ford in 2012
- Born: William Clay Ford Jr. May 3, 1957 (age 69); Detroit, Michigan, U.S.
- Education: Princeton University (BA); Massachusetts Institute of Technology (MS)
- Occupation: Executive Chairman of the Ford Motor Company
- Spouse: Lisa Vanderzee
- Children: 4
- Parents: William Clay Ford Sr. (father); Martha Parke Firestone (mother)
- Relatives: Sheila Ford Hamp (sister); Henry Ford I (great-grandfather); Edsel Ford (grandfather); Henry Ford II (uncle); Edsel Ford II (cousin); Harvey S. Firestone Sr. (great-grandfather); Harvey S. Firestone Jr. (grandfather)
- Family: Ford

William Clay Ford Jr. (born May 3, 1957) is an American businessman, and the executive chair of Ford Motor Company since 1999. The great-grandson of company founder Henry Ford, Ford joined the board in 1988, and was CEO of the company from 2001 to 2006. He is the vice chair of the Detroit Lions NFL franchise, and chair of the United States-Mexico Chamber of Commerce.

== Early life and education ==
Bill Ford was born in Detroit, Michigan, the great-grandson of Henry Ford I and great-grandson of Harvey S. Firestone Sr. His father was William Clay Ford Sr. and his mother was Martha Parke Firestone. On his mother's side, his grandparents were Harvey S. Firestone Jr. and Elizabeth Parke. On his father's side, his grandparents were Edsel Ford and Eleanor Lowthian Clay. Edsel Ford II, son of Henry Ford II and also a board member, is his first cousin. Ford has three sisters: Martha Morse (who has 3 children), Sheila Ford Hamp (who has 3 children), and Elizabeth Kontulis. He, like his great-grandfather Henry Ford I, is of mainly Irish, English, and Belgian descent.

Ford graduated from the Hotchkiss School in Connecticut in 1975. He then attended Princeton University and graduated with an B.A. in history in 1979 after completing a 105-page long senior thesis titled "Henry Ford and Labor: A Reappraisal." While a student at Princeton, Ford was president of the Ivy Club and played on the Princeton rugby team. In 1984 he received an M.S. in management as a Sloan Fellow from the MIT Sloan School of Management.

== Career ==
He joined Ford in 1979 and held a variety of positions, beginning in product development and on the financial staff, a grooming ground for future executives. He served several years as a mid-ranking executive in product development. He also briefly headed the Climate Control Division (since divested from the company as part of the Visteon spinoff). At the time of the Ford 2000 reorganization, he was in charge of heavy truck operations.

=== Corporate governance ===
Ford gave up an executive position in heavy truck program management to become chairman of the finance committee on the board of directors, a non-executive corporate governance position. He was elected chairman of the board in September 1998 and took office on January 1, 1999. Ford added the title of chief executive officer on October 30, 2001, following the ouster of then-CEO Jacques Nasser. With the retirement of Ford president and chief operating officer Jim Padilla in April 2006, Bill Ford assumed those roles as well. On September 5, 2006, Ford announced that he was stepping down as president and CEO, naming former Boeing senior executive Alan Mulally as his replacement. Ford continues as the company's executive chairman.

At the time of his stepping down, Ford was ranked 264th on Forbes' list of top-earning CEOs, at $10 million per year.

=== Business developments ===
In 2000, he announced that the company would achieve a 25% improvement in fuel efficiency in the company's light truck fleet, including SUVs, by mid-decade.

Under his direction, Ford Motor Company made technological progress toward improving fuel efficiency, with the introduction of the Hybrid Electric Escape, the most fuel-efficient SUV on the market, achieving 36 mpg (EPA) in city driving. The Escape's platform mates Mercury Mariner and Mazda Tribute were also scheduled to receive hybrid-electric powertrain options, along with other upcoming vehicles in the Ford product line including the Ford Fusion and Mercury Milan. Ford announced that half of the vehicle lineup would be available with advanced hybrid-electric powerplant options by 2010, although the company's earlier pledge to build 250,000 hybrid vehicles a year by 2010 proved to be overly optimistic and had to be abandoned. Ford also continued to study Fuel Cell-powered electric powertrains and demonstrated hydrogen-fueled internal combustion engine technologies, as well as developing the next-generation hybrid-electric systems. In addition to the Ford Escape, Hybrid Escape, Mercury Mariner, and Mazda Tribute, Ford marketed high efficiency crossover SUVs such as the Ford Freestyle, the Volvo XC70 and the Volvo XC90. Ford also developed new crossover SUVs, such as the Ford Edge, Lincoln MKX, and Mazda CX-7.

Ford expanded its lineup of flexible-fuel vehicles, alternative fuel vehicles, and dual-fuel vehicles. Flexible fuel vehicles can operate on a range of fuel mixtures – such as ethanol-gasoline blends ranging from pure gasoline to E85 (85% ethanol, 15% gasoline). Alternative fuel vehicles operate on non-petroleum fuels, such as methanol, compressed natural gas (CNG), propane, and hydrogen. Dual fuel vehicles generally have two fuel tanks – one for compressed natural gas or propane, and another for regular gasoline – with a selector switch to choose between them. Vehicles using those fueling alternatives were in test fleets, for example as taxis and shuttle buses, and some were available for sale to the public. Ford was committed to sell 250,000 alternative and flexible fuel vehicles – the majority of which would be designed to operate on ethanol-gasoline blends such as E85 – in 2006.

Speaking at conference in November 2000 in London, Ford suggested that the company might one day offer a service where it owns vehicles and makes them available to people when they need access to them.

Market competition, health care, and raw material costs led Ford to announce a second restructuring for its North American operations in four years. Ford's restructuring plan, dubbed "The Way Forward", reversed a $1.6 billion loss during 2009 in its North American operations. The company returned to profitability in 2010.

=== Fontinalis Partners ===
Ford has been a vocal advocate for improvements to be made in all modes of global transportation, having stated that governments and private industry would need to rethink transportation infrastructure and technology as the global population expands and the existing infrastructure is unable to keep pace. In January 2010, he announced the launch of a strategic investment firm, Fontinalis Partners, with the purpose of investing in innovative companies developing next-generation mobility solutions. Ford co-founded the firm with Ralph Booth (chairman and CEO of Booth American Company and a media and telecom investor), Mark Schulz (former head of Ford Motor Company's international operations), Chris Cheever, and Chris Thomas.

== Personal life ==
Bill Ford is married to Lisa Vanderzee and they have four children. He is a first cousin of Alfred Ford.

Ford has been a vegetarian since 1990, and adopted a vegan diet in 2010.

== See also ==
- Ford family (Michigan)

Business positions
Preceded by Alexander Trotman	Chairman of the Ford Motor Company; 1999–present	Incumbent
Preceded by Jacques Nasser	CEO of the Ford Motor Company; 2001–2006	Succeeded by Alan Mulally
