= Harvey S. Firestone Jr. =

American businessman and United States Naval aviator

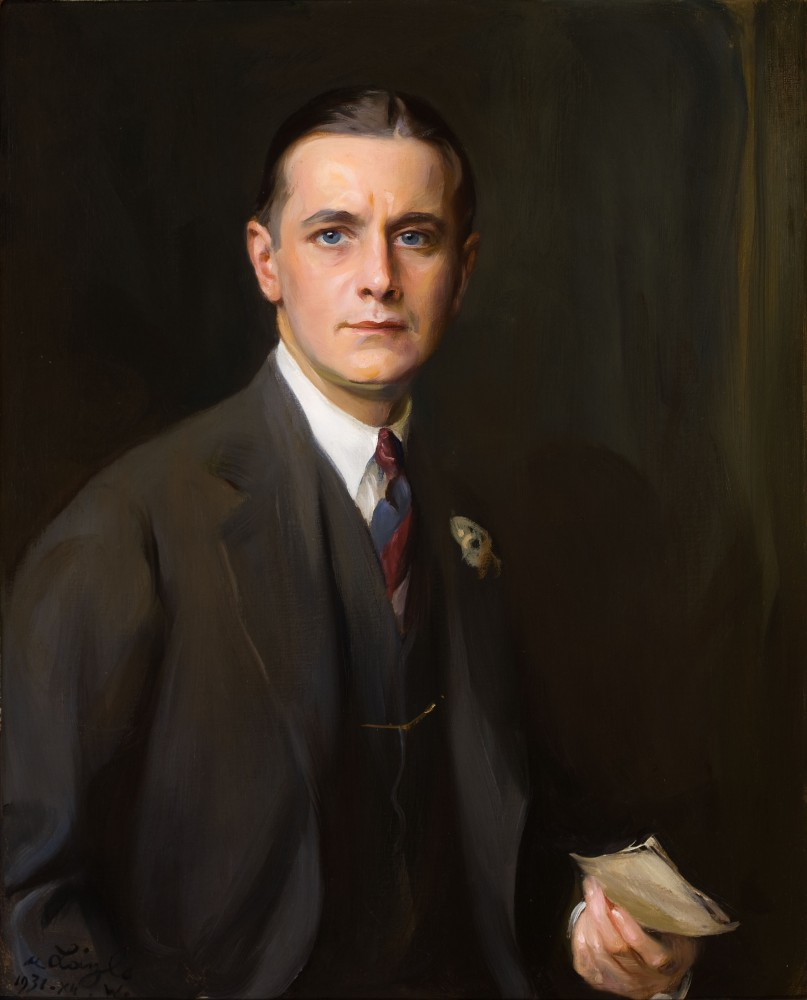
- Born: Harvey Samuel Firestone Jr. April 20, 1898; Columbiana, Ohio, U.S.
- Died: June 1, 1973 (aged 75); Akron, Ohio, U.S.
- Education: Princeton University
- Occupations: Vice President of Firestone Tire and Rubber Company
- Spouse: Elizabeth Parke (m. 1921)
- Children: 4, including Martha
- Parents: Harvey S. Firestone Sr. (father); Idabelle Smith (mother)
- Relatives: Leonard Firestone (brother)

Harvey Samuel Firestone Jr. (April 20, 1898 – June 1, 1973) was an American businessman. He was chairman of the board of the Firestone Tire and Rubber Company.

== Biography ==
He was born on April 20, 1898, to Harvey Samuel Firestone and Idabelle Smith Firestone and educated at Asheville School in Asheville, North Carolina. He served as a naval aviator during World War I. After Harvey Jr. graduated from Princeton University in 1920, Harvey Sr. placed him in charge of his company's steel products division; Harvey Jr. took over the leadership of the company in 1941.

Firestone helped establish the company's supply and service stores, and guided its operations during World War II. He was also president of the Firestone Foundation.

Firestone married Elizabeth Parke Firestone in 1921. They had four children: Elizabeth, Anne, Martha, and Harvey Samuel III. Martha married William Clay Ford Sr. and was, as of his death in 2014, the owner of the Detroit Lions. Harvey III died in Havana in 1960. Harvey Jr. died on June 1, 1973.

== Liberia ==
During World War I, Britain and the Netherlands controlled 98% of the raw materials necessary for the production of rubber. After the Rubber Restriction Act was passed in Britain in 1922, the costs that the Firestone Tire and Rubber Company paid for its supplies rose. Starting in 1924, Firestone was assigned to travel worldwide in search of locations where the company could grow its own rubber. After visits to Asia and to Mexico, he settled on Liberia as the base for Firestone Natural Rubber Company. He arranged for the lease of 1,500 square miles (3,900 km^{2}) of Liberian territory, a little more than 3 percent of that nation's area. The 12,000 Liberian employees were paid low wages and many were alleged to have been slaves, because, as former employee Arthur Hayman described, the Liberian government felt that "men with money in their pockets would eventually have demanded the ballot".

Firestone Jr. ran a public relations campaign to repair the public image of the company, portraying themselves as providing healthcare, job opportunities, and financial betterment to the region. This established an image that prevailed for decades while the company directly aided Liberian government officials in owning rubber plantations themselves, including the country's former dictator, William V.S. Tubman, who Firestone maintained close ties with.

This farm would later be compared to “an old Southern plantation" by Firestone executives. This is due to the plantation consisting of poorly paid workers who would live on company property in small, one-room dwellings with their wives and children. These dwellings lacked electricity, running water, and kitchens - with instead outhouses and communal kitchens relied on for sustenance. The workers' wives and children would often be employed as well due to a labor shortage.

A ProPublica investigation reveals that Firestone directly aided in the Liberian civil war and the establishment of Charles Taylor's dictatorship in Liberia, providing resources like food, water, guns, vehicles, and housing to Taylor and his supporters. They directly funded the dictatorship with millions of dollars, and representatives from Firestone confirmed at least some degree of direct involvement with the company and Taylor's government, although they deny knowledge of his human rights violations. While Taylor was ruling, workers were murdered and threatened with imprisonment for any disobedience from the government, creating an almost slave-like environment. Former employees allege they tried to warn the company, but to no avail. Taylor would openly establish the plantation as a base of operations while running the government.

== Legacy ==
He was inducted as a National Patron of Delta Omicron, an international professional music fraternity for his philanthropic efforts.

His grandson, William Clay Ford Jr., is the current Chairman of the Board of Directors of the Ford Motor Company.

== See also ==
- Ford family tree

== Sources ==
- Almanac of Famous People (eighth ed.). 2004.
