= Elizabeth Parke Firestone =

Mother of Martha Firestone

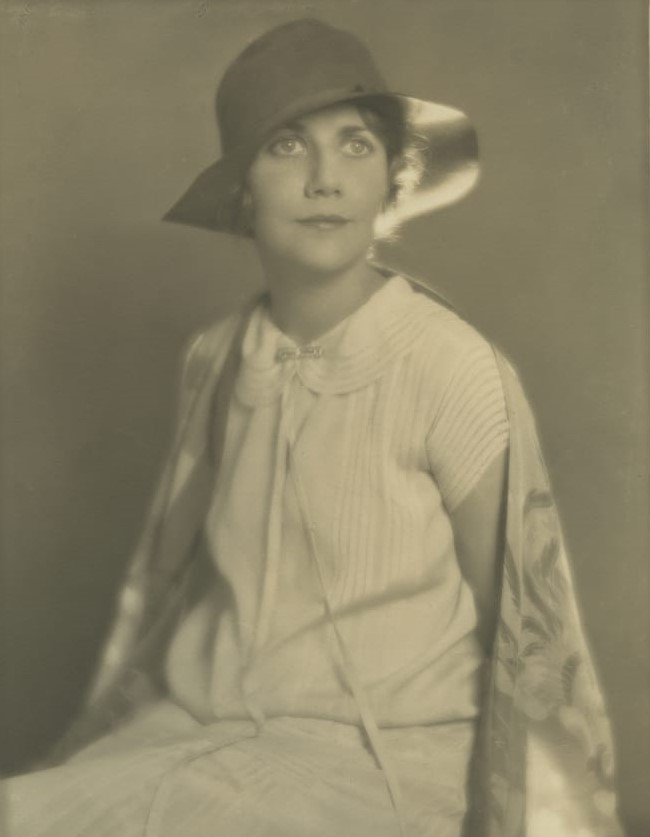
- Born: Elizabeth Parke; 1897; Decatur, Illinois, US
- Died: October 13, 1990 (aged 92–93); Newport, Rhode Island, US
- Spouse: Harvey S. Firestone Jr. (m. 1921; died 1973)
- Children: 4, including Martha Firestone Ford

Elizabeth Parke Firestone (née Parke, 1897–1990) was the mother of Martha Firestone, who wed William Clay Ford Sr., grandson of Henry Ford. She is the daughter of Guy James Parke and Gertrude Chambers, and daughter-in-law of Harvey Firestone. Between 1915 and 1975, she acquired extraordinary clothes which today are on display at the Benson Ford Research Center. Her grandson William Clay Ford Jr., is the current chairman of the Board of Directors for Ford Motor Company. He had previously served as the chief executive officer and chief operating officer of Ford.

== Personal life ==
On June 25, 1921, Firestone married Harvey S. Firestone Jr. (1898-1973). They have three daughters and a son.

On October 13, 1990, Firestone died in Newport Hospital in Rhode Island. Firestone was 93. Firestone is interred at Columbiana Cemetery in Columbiana, Ohio.

== See also ==
- Ford family tree
