= Firestone Diamonds =

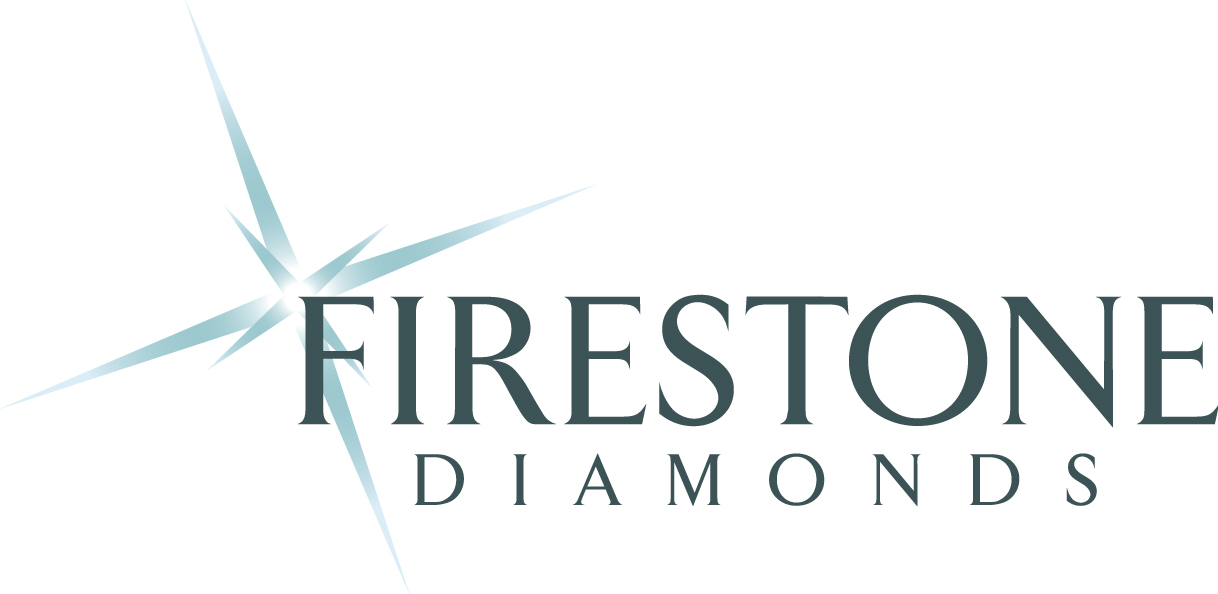
- Company type: Public company
- Traded as: AIM: FDI
- Industry: Mining
- Headquarters: London, England, UK
- Key people: Lucio Genovese, Non-Executive Chairman; Stuart Brown, Chief Executive Officer
- Products: Diamonds
- Revenue: Pound sterling
- Total assets: £118.19 million (2014)
- Website: www.firestonediamonds.com

Firestone Diamonds plc is an AIM-listed United Kingdom-based company, operating in Lesotho and Botswana. In May 2018, the firm announced the appointment of Paul Bosma as CEO slated to succeed Stuart Brown on 1 July 2018. In 2021 Firestone Diamonds appointed Rob De Pretto as CEO to succeed Paul Bosma, who has left the company after seven years. He has also held executive and leadership roles at Diamcor Mining, Anglo American Research and De Beers.

== Liqhobong Mine, Lesotho ==
The Lighobong diamond mine ('Liqhobong' or the 'Project') in Lesotho is Firestone's principal asset, and was acquired as a result of the acquisition of Kopane Diamond Developments plc in September 2010. Liqhobong is located at the head of the Liqhobong Valley in the Maluti Mountains of northern Lesotho and is operated by Liqhobong Mining Development Company (Proprietary) Limited ('LMDC'), which is 75% owned by Firestone Diamonds and 25% owned by the government of Lesotho.

== BK11 Mine, Botswana ==
The BK11 kimberlite mine is located in the Orapa kimberlite field in northern Botswana. BK11 is located approximately 10 kilometres west and 20 kilometres southeast of De Beers' Letlhakane and Orapa mines, respectively, and is within 5 kilometres of the Karowe mine operated by Lucara Diamond Corp.

Initial pit design work indicates that approximately 12 Mt of kimberlite can be extracted at an average grade of 8 carats per hundred tonnes containing circa 0.9 million carats. Phase 1 of the BK11 production plant commenced in August 2010 but was placed on care and maintenance in February 2012 as a result of the plant's inability to successfully liberate diamonds. Phase 2 which included secondary and tertiary crushing circuits and connection to the existing electrical power infrastructure remains to be implemented.

The Board is considering various strategic alternatives for its Botswana operation, including disposal or potential joint venture options.

BK11 has been acquired by Tango Mining, a TSX Venture listed junior mining company.
