= Lighobong diamond mine =

Diamond mine in Butha-Buthe District, Lesotho

Lighobong mine
- Interactive map of Lighobong mine
- Location: Butha-Buthe District, Lesotho; 28.985750°S 28.620479°E
- Products: diamond
- Company: Firestone Diamonds

The Lighobong mine is one of the largest diamond mines in Lesotho and in the world. The mine is located in the northern part of the country near the Maloti Mountains. The mine has estimated reserves of 19 million carats of diamonds and an annual production capacity of 1 million carats.

The mine in Lesotho is Firestone Diamonds’s principal asset, and was acquired as a result of the acquisition of Kopane Diamond Developments plc for $71 million in July 2010. It is operated by Liqhobong Mining Development Company (Proprietary) Limited (‘LMDC’), which is 75% owned by Firestone Diamonds and 25% owned by the government of Lesotho.
