= Louisville Metro Department of Corrections =

Louisville Metro Department of Corrections Metro Corrections
- Abbreviation: LMDC

Agency overview
- Formed: January 1, 2003
- Preceding agency: Jefferson County Corrections Department

Jurisdictional structure
- Operations jurisdiction: Louisville, Kentucky, United States
- Legal jurisdiction: Commonwealth of Kentucky
- Governing body: Louisville Metro Council
- General nature: Local civilian police

Operational structure
- Headquarters: 400 South 6th Street, Louisville, Kentucky, United States
- Correction Officers: 447
- Civilian employees: 113
- Elected officer responsible: Craig Greenberg, Mayor of Louisville
- Agency executive: Jerry Collins, Chief

The Louisville Metro Department of Corrections (LMDC), known locally as Metro Corrections, is a local corrections agency/jail system responsible for the booking and incarceration of inmates and arrestees in Louisville, Kentucky. The agency was previously known as the Jefferson County Corrections Department, but the name was changed with the merger of city and county governments in 2003.

LMDC operates two facilities: The Main Jail Complex (MJC) at 6th and Liberty Streets, the adjacent Hall of Justice (HOJ) on 6th and Jefferson, LMDC formally operated Community Corrections Center (CCC) on Chestnut Street, however that facility was demolished in 2025 to make room for the cities new "med district" park The department also previously maintained a holding area, which is a 126-bed jail facility on the third floor of the Louisville Metro Police Department headquarters, which has only been used sporadically, in instances of extreme overcrowding of the primary facility; however that facility was demolished when the previous Louisville Metro Police Department Headquarters (633 W. Jefferson Street) was demolished in 2024.

LMDC employs 447 sworn staff and 113 civilian staff members, as well as a host of contract medical and food services personnel. As of March 2022, the current Chief (Director) is Jerry Collins, a tenured employee of LMDC. Collins replacing former Chief Dwayne Clark.

== Powers ==
Louisville Metro Corrections officers are sworn law enforcement officers in accordance with KRS 446.010(31).

== Organization and rank structure ==
Louisville Metro Corrections is headed by an appointed Director, who reports to the Mayor's Office. The Director is responsible for administrative oversight of all aspects of the corrections operations. Under the Director are senior staff members including two deputy directors and a major. One deputy director serves as chief of staff and second in command, and a second deputy director provides oversight of classification and programming such as day reporting, home incarceration and is a liaison with the Kentucky Department of Corrections, as well as other state jailers. The major reports to the Chief of Staff, and is responsible for the security operations of the Main Jail Complex and the Hall of Justice, and also administratively oversees the sworn staff. Other responsibilities of the major include facilities maintenance, fire safety, transportation, and the Special Operations Response Team (SORT) and the Crisis Intervention Team (CIT). Reporting to the major are six captains; three assigned to the MJC with one captain to each shift, as well as one captain assigned to the CCC facility, the Home Incarceration Program (HIP) and the Training Academy. Lieutenants provide shift supervision, with sergeants exercising supervisory authority over officers in specific sections of the facilities on their assigned shifts.

LMDC follows a standard military-based rank structure with two exceptions, noted below:

Title	Insignia
Director	
Deputy Director	
Major	
Captain	
Lieutenant	
Sergeant	
Officer	"METRO" Collar insiginia

== LMPD holding area ==
Challenges have arisen for LMDC regarding the department's use of the nearly 60-year-old former jail complex in the LMPD headquarters, known within LMPD as Unit 7 and commonly referred to within LMDC as "H3". The unit is not within KDOC's standards for jails as it lacks necessary fire safety systems and has not met certification standards for decades. Director Mark Bolton closed the unit when he was named director in 2008. However, for an 11-day period in 2011, Director Bolton ordered the old jail be opened due to extreme overcrowding conditions at the Main Jail Complex that posed a safety threat for officers and employees. At that time, the Main Jail Complex was over capacity, and some of the 300+ beds within the Hall of Justice were unusable due to an HVAC system upgrade that was underway. The old jail has 126 beds and during the time it was open, an average of 50 inmates were housed there.

Unit 7 was reopened again on August 19, 2013, due to overcrowding, and 72 inmates were moved there. During this time, Director Bolton acknowledged that opening the unit was not a "safe solution", and that by doing so he risked censure from the state, but he felt that opening the old jail was preferable over keeping too many inmates crowded in the primary facilities, which risked staff safety.

The LMPD Holding Area H3 (Unit 7) was demolished in 2024 when the former LMPD Headquarters was demolished.

== Technology ==
LMDC has seen a 50% reduction in the amount of contraband being introduced into the jail complex after installing a body scanner. The scanner allows for officers to better detect contraband items being hidden on persons' bodies such as drugs, cell phones, and lighters. The scanner is located in the booking area and is used as individuals are first brought into the facility. The department has also installed a scanner for the Community Corrections Center on Chestnut Street.

== Contract services ==
Aramark is the currently contract provider for Inmate Food Services and Commissary. Trinity Services was the previous contract provider for Inmate Food Services and Commissary.

YesCare is the current contract provider for Inmate Mental Health and Healthcare. YesCare also provides a Medical Doctor on staff and on site at LMDC with the new contact. Wellpath was the previous provider for Inmate Mental Health and Healthcare.

== ACA Core Standards Accreditation ==
In October 2014, LMDC announced the accomplishment of passing their first-ever American Correctional Association (ACA) Core Jail Standards Accreditation audit. They received a total score of 100% compliance on 46 mandatory critical jail industry standards, and 95.6% compliance on 91 non-mandatory standards, which exceeds the minimum for Core Jail Certification.

ACA audits consist of 146 Core Jail Standards that include assessments of the jail administration and management, operations, and inmate programs, as well as issues that impact the lives of inmates and staff, and is only awarded to the "best of the best" in corrections. The accreditation is good for 3 years, with follow-up audits conducted on a continuous 3-year cycle.

== Population statistics ==
Following are statistics for Fiscal Year 2012-13:

- Rated Detention Bed Capacity: 1,793
- Average Daily Population:
  - In-Bed Detention: 1,991
  - Home Incarceration: 615
  - Day Reporting: 34

== Public Arrest Records ==
Public Arrest Records (Mugshots) are available on the city's website https://mugshots.louisvilleky.gov
