= Thomas Feuerstein =

Austrian artist

- Born: 1968 (age 57–58); Innsbruck, Austria
- Known for: Installation Art, Sculpture, BioArt
- Website: https://thomasfeuerstein.net/

Thomas Feuerstein (born 1968, Innsbruck) is an Austrian contemporary artist. His works and projects are realized in different media. They include sculptures, installations, environments, objects, drawings, paintings, radio plays as well net art and BioArt. Feuerstein’s work is known for growth and transience, processes of transformation, biological metabolism and entropy.

== Biography ==
Thomas Feuerstein was born in Innsbruck, Austria, and lives in Vienna, Austria. He studied art history and philosophy at the University of Innsbruck from 1987 to 1995. From 1992 to 1994 he was co-editor of the magazine Medien.Kunst.Passagen. In 1992 and 1993 he worked on research assignments on electronic space as well as on art and architecture. Since 1997 he has held lectureships and guest professorships at University of Applied Arts Vienna, University of the Arts Bern, F+F School for Art and Media Design Zurich, Mozarteum University Salzburg and University of Innsbruck.

== Work ==
Feuerstein's work involves digital and biochemical processes and transmutations, with specific materialities playing a central role. Processes and materials are used both as carriers of meaning and narrations and in the form of materials, and ultimately become agents in art. Essential aspects are the interplay of linguistic, visual and molecular-processual elements, the detection of latent links between facts and fictions as well as the entanglement between art and science. Feuerstein developed the artistic method of "conceptual narration" for this purpose. At the border between nature, art and science, Feuerstein's works set in motion pataphysical cycles of the production of meaning and possibilities. The works contain pataphysical references to Alfred Jarry, Raymond Roussel or Marcel Duchamp. In contrast to historical pataphysics, machines, apparatuses and scientific methods are not only attributed metaphorical and symbolic meanings, but used for real processes. Feuerstein speaks of "patachemistry" and "patabiology" in the context of projects involving biological organisms and processes. Examples of this are metabolic processes in which artistic materials are produced, altered or digested in the form of objects and sculptures. References to aspects of entropy in Robert Smithson's work or to Robert Morris' form and anti-form can be found in works with biofilms, slime, fungi, and myxomycetes.

=== Digital Art ===
Since the late 1980s Feuerstein has developed algorithmic and cybernetic art. Initially as an extension of abstract art and concrete poetry, from the early 1990s he has used software to process online data: Hausmusik (1993) transposes stock market data into chamber music, Realdata Stampede (1994) converts news data into techno beats, Manifesto (2009) draws a cloud based on data from the Lloyd's of London insurance market. Proustmachine (1994) or Borgy & Bes (2008) use artificial neural networks to generate literary texts and linguistic dialogues.

Feuerstein's digital works examine cybernetic culture in the context of economy, politics, and posthumanism. For this purpose, he evolves a cybernetic demonology that, based on the Greek daimon, investigates cultural informatization from the Maxwell demon through server processes to big data and AI.

=== BioArt ===
Thomas Feuerstein, Prometheus delivered, 2017-2019. Exhibition view 15th Biennale de Lyon, 2019

The project Biophily (1993-2002) dealt with Internet geography and biotechnology. Feuerstein realized performative works in Tanzania, Namibia, India, California and Kyrgyzstan. In Trivandrum he had a Hindu avatar marry him to a rubber tree, to which his own genes were later added by means gene gun. From the end of the 1990s, works and exhibitions with biological model organisms, own body cells, fungi and algae, bacteria and archaea followed.

In Manna Machines he cultivates algae, which are processed into pigment for monochrome paintings, food and spirits. In the exhibitions Psychoprosa, he extracts tyrosine from algae and psilocybin from mushrooms to synthesize a novel psychotropic substance that he describes as a molecular sculpture or ironically as the world's smallest sculpture.

An exemplary "patabiological" machine is the installation Pancreas, which feeds and nourishes glucose, extracted from the cellulose of books according to Hegel's Phenomenology of Spirit, to a culture of human brain cells.

In Prometheus delivered chemolithoautotrophic bacteria decompose a marble sculpture and in return nourish a culture of human liver cells.

== Selected publications ==
- Feuerstein, Thomas (1995), System-Daten-Welt-Architektur, Vienna: Triton, ISBN 3-901310-25-8, OCLC 722516136
- Feuerstein, Thomas; et al. (1997), Diskurs der Systeme, Vienna: Triton, ISBN 3-901310-39-8, OCLC 722299280
- Feuerstein, Thomas; et al. (2001), Media-made, Cologne: Wienand, ISBN 3-87909-763-1, OCLC 50977220
- Feuerstein, Thomas (2002), Biophily. Better dead than read, Vienna: Triton, ISBN 3-85486-085-4, OCLC 201702607
- Feuerstein, Thomas; et al. (2003), Selbst: Darstellung, Bern: Benteli, ISBN 3-7165-1329-6, OCLC 727738449
- Feuerstein, Thomas; et al. (2004), Sample Minds, Cologne: König, ISBN 3-88375-787-X, OCLC 722812545
- Feuerstein, Thomas; et al. (2005), Plus ultra, Cologne: König, ISBN 3-86588-129-7, OCLC 7954964359

== Bibliography ==
- Fuchs, Herbert (2002), Thomas Feuerstein. Roundup ready, Innsbruck: Studienverlag, ISBN 3-7082-3105-8, OCLC 759055494
- Schuler, Romana (2003), Thomas Feuerstein. fiat::radikale individuen – soziale genossen, Vienna: Triton, ISBN 3-85486-182-6, OCLC 180883624
- Thoman, Klaus (2006), Thomas Feuerstein. Outcast of the Universe, Vienna: Schlebrügge.Editor, ISBN 3-85160-072-X, OCLC 1074100117
- Thoman, Klaus (2011), Thomas Feuerstein. POEM, Vienna: Schlebrügge.Editor, ISBN 978-3-902833-08-2, OCLC 779625463
- Wipplinger, Hans-Peter (2012), Thomas Feuerstein. TRICKSTER, Cologne: Snoeck, ISBN 978-3-86442-031-3, OCLC 824727386
- Bernsteiner, Alois (2014), Thomas Feuerstein. FUTUR II, Vienna: Schlebrügge.Editor, ISBN 978-3-902833-51-8, OCLC 912064478
- Ermacora, Beate (2015), Thomas Feuerstein. PSYCHOPROSA, Cologne: Snoeck, ISBN 978-3-86442-124-2, OCLC 911122861
- Adler, Sabine (2018), Thomas Feuerstein, Munich: ERES Foundation, ISBN 978-3-00-058106-9, OCLC 1089702190
- Häusle, Thomas (2018), Thomas Feuerstein. CLUBCANNIBAL, Vienna: VfmK, ISBN 978-3-903269-03-3, OCLC 1048673193
