= Sheila Ford Hamp =

American businesswoman and sports team owner (born 1951)

- Born: Sheila Firestone Ford; October 31, 1951 (age 75); Detroit, Michigan, U.S.
- Education: Miss Porter's School (Class of 1969); Yale University (BA); Boston University (MA)
- Occupations: Businesswoman and sports franchise owner
- Known for: Principal owner and chairwoman of the Detroit Lions
- Spouse: Steve Hamp
- Children: 3
- Parents: William Clay Ford Sr. (father); Martha Parke Firestone (mother)
- Family: Ford

Sheila Ford Hamp (born Sheila Firestone Ford; October 31, 1951) is an American businesswoman and football executive. A descendant of both the Ford and Firestone families, she is the principal owner and chairwoman of the Detroit Lions of the National Football League (NFL). Hamp graduated from Yale University in 1973, where she played varsity tennis, and has an MA in teaching and early childhood education from Boston University. She serves on the NFL's Super Bowl and Major Events Committee. Hamp had served as vice chairwoman of the Lions since 2014, and succeeded her mother Martha Firestone Ford on June 23, 2020.

Sheila Firestone Ford was born to William Clay Ford Sr. (son of Edsel Ford and grandson of Henry Ford) and Martha Firestone Ford, of the Firestone Tire and Rubber Company fortune, in 1951. She earned a bachelor's degree from Yale in 1973, where she was among the first class that included women. She received a master's degree in teaching and early childhood education from Boston University. Ford competed in tennis while at Yale and won a Michigan state championship in high school.

Hamp has been involved in the management of the Detroit Lions since her mother took over the team in 2014. In 2015, she was involved in the decision to fire Tom Lewand and Martin Mayhew. In 2019, she was involved in the retention of general manager Bob Quinn and head coach Matt Patricia. On June 23, 2020, Hamp took over from her mother as principal owner and chairwoman. Her first major move after taking over as principal owner of the Lions was to fire Quinn and Patricia on November 28, 2020, after a 4–7 start to the 2020 season. Hamp taking ownership of the Lions marked the first time in NFL history where team ownership was passed between two women.

Under Hamp's watch, the Lions named Brad Holmes as general manager on January 14, 2021 and Dan Campbell as head coach six days later on January 20. She voiced her support for both Holmes and Campbell on October 26, 2022 despite the Lions' record being 4–18–1 since the dual appointments, stating, "I think we’ve got the right people in place to pull this off." The team subsequently qualified for the playoffs in two straight seasons starting in 2023.

Ford Hamp is married to Steve Hamp and lives with her husband and three sons in Ann Arbor, Michigan.

Sporting positions
Preceded by Martha Firestone Ford	Detroit Lions principal owner 2020–present	Incumbent
