= William Clay Ford Sr. =

American football executive (1925–2014)

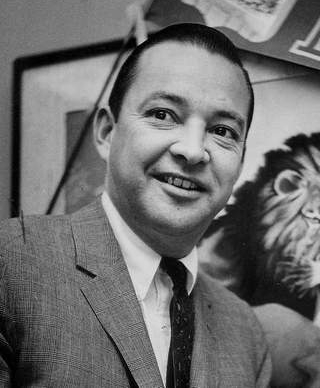
- Ford in 1961
- Born: William Clay Ford; March 14, 1925; Detroit, Michigan, U.S.
- Died: March 9, 2014 (aged 88); Grosse Pointe Shores, Michigan, U.S.
- Resting place: Woodlawn Cemetery, Detroit
- Education: Yale University (BS)
- Occupations: Chairman of the Detroit Lions; Executive of Ford Motor Company
- Spouse: Martha Parke Firestone (m. 1947)
- Children: 4, including Sheila and William Jr.
- Parents: Edsel Bryant Ford (father); Eleanor Lowthian Clay (mother)
- Family: Ford

William Clay Ford Sr. (March 14, 1925 – March 9, 2014) was an American businessman who was on the boards of Ford Motor Company and the Edison Institute. Ford owned the Detroit Lions of the National Football League (NFL) from 1964 until his death. He was the youngest child of Edsel Ford and was the last surviving grandchild of Henry Ford.

== Early life and education ==
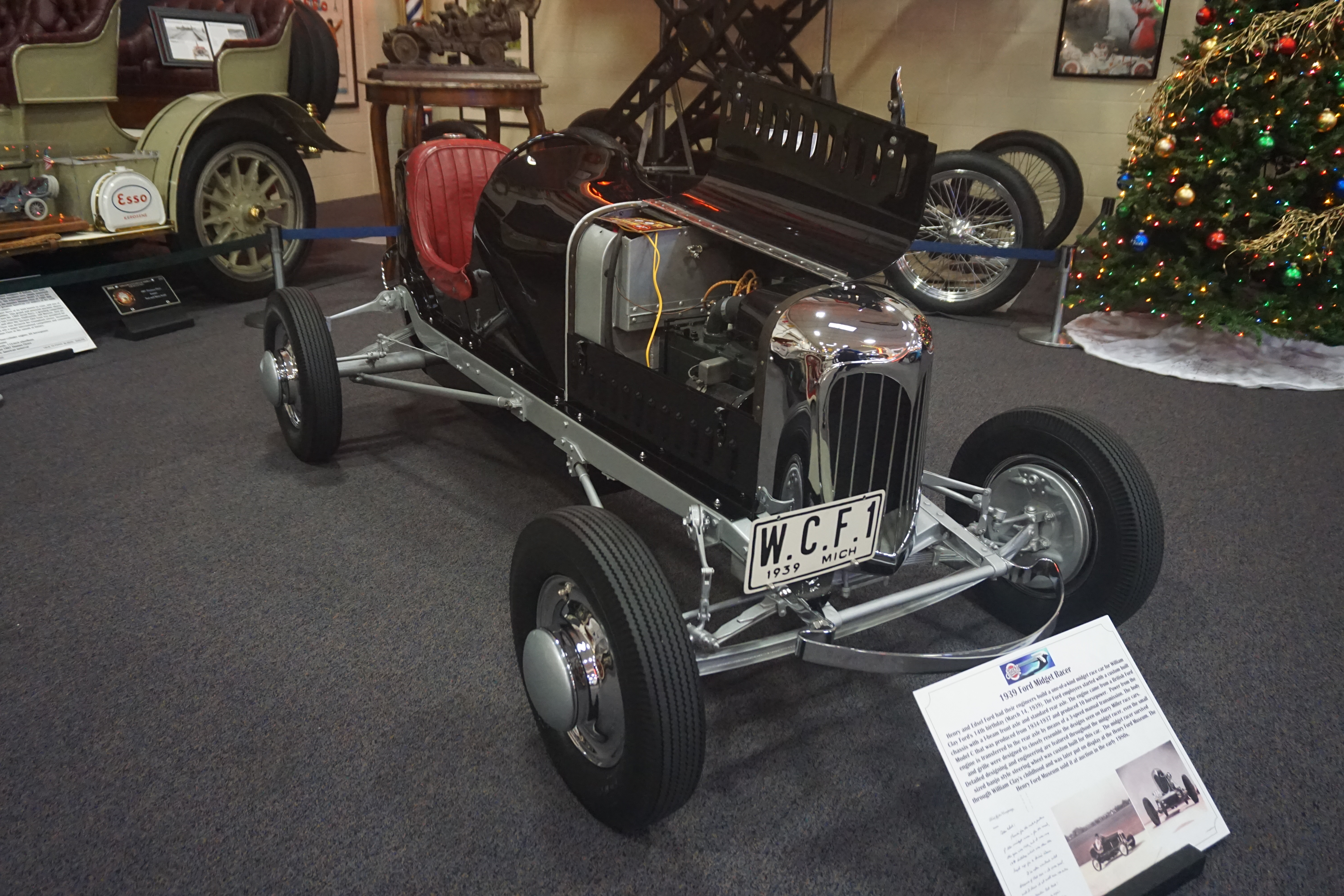
William Clay Ford's 1939 Ford Midget Racer at Stahls Automotive Collection

Ford was born on March 14, 1925, in Detroit to Edsel Ford and Eleanor Lowthian Clay.

He graduated from the Hotchkiss School in Lakeville, Connecticut, in 1943 and received a Bachelor of Science in economics from Yale University in 1949; he was a member of the Psi Upsilon fraternity, captain of the soccer and tennis teams, an honorable mention all American selection in soccer senior year, and winner of seven varsity letters as a collegiate athlete. Ford also served in the U.S. Navy Air Corps during World War II.

== Personal life ==
Following the war, Ford married Martha Parke Firestone, the granddaughter of Harvey Firestone and Idabelle Smith Firestone, on June 21, 1947, at St. Paul's Episcopal Church in Akron, Ohio. William first met Martha at a lunch in New York City arranged and attended by both of their mothers, according to the biography The Fords. Martha then was a Vassar student who had the college nickname "Stoney." He was a naval cadet at St. Mary's U.S. Navy Pre-Flight School from 1943 to 1945. By that time both families had acquired considerable wealth, and the matchup between the grandchildren of two empire-builders was reported by numerous news outlets. The Akron Beacon Journal called the Firestone-Ford nuptials "the biggest society wedding in Akron's history" and "the biggest show Akron has seen in years" in numerous articles chronicling the event. The couple received gifts from F.B.I. Director J. Edgar Hoover, media publisher John S. Knight, and Mina Miller Edison.

The couple had four children: Martha Parke Ford Morse (b. 1948), Sheila Firestone Ford Hamp (b. 1951), William Clay Ford Jr. (b. 1957), and Elizabeth Hudson Ford Kontulis (b. 1961). As of 2018, his son William was the Executive Chairman of the Board of Directors of Ford Motor Company. He had previously been the chief executive officer and Chief Operating Officer of Ford. Their children Martha, Sheila, and William are Vice Chairpersons of the Detroit Lions, while Sheila was announced to take over as principal owner and chairwoman in June 2020.

== Professional career ==
After graduating from Yale, Ford worked for the Ford Motor Company, and briefly led the Continental Division. The Continental Division, however, was short-lived and merged with the Lincoln Motor Company shortly before Ford's public stock offering. Ford redesigned the Lincoln Continental, a vehicle his father created; in 1955, the Continental Mark II was released. Only two pictures adorned his office wall, his father's Continental and his updated Mark II.

In 1948, a year after Henry Ford's death, Ford was appointed to Ford Motor Company's board of directors. Ford was chairman of the board at the Henry Ford Museum, from 1951 to 1983. He was also involved in other historic properties, on the boards of the Wayside Inn and Seaboard Properties, which managed the Dearborn Inn and Botsford Inn. On April 10, 1952, an iron ore-hauling ship, the SS William Clay Ford, was named in his honor.

He was Ford Motor Company's Design Committee chairman for 32 years, from 1957 to 1989. He was on the board of directors for 57 years, retiring on May 12, 2005, including being chairman of the Finance Committee. His son, William Clay Ford Jr., was Ford Motor Company's CEO at the time.

According to Forbes magazine, Ford was the 371st richest person in the United States in 2013, with an approximate net worth of $1.4 billion. He reportedly owned in Ford Motor Company: 6.7 million shares of Class B stock and 26.3 million common shares; making him the largest single shareholder. In 2000 the company restructured and paid out a $10 billion special dividend. According to an article from 2000, incidental to a repurchase of outstanding shares: "The Ford family holds all 71 million shares of the company's Class B stock, along with a small number of the company's 1.1 billion common shares. Under rules designed to preserve family control and drafted when the company went public in 1956, the family holds 40 percent of the voting power at the company as long as it continues to own at least 60.7 million shares of the Class B stock – even though the Class B shares make up only 6 percent of the company's overall equity. The Ford family owns all 70+ million shares of the Class B stock. It is a way for them to ensure they keep control of the company no matter how much stock they have to issue to avoid bankruptcy. Some argue that dual class structures are inherently unfair because you are decoupling ownership from voting power."

== Sports ownership ==
A minority owner of the Detroit Lions since 1956 and team president since 1961, Ford took advantage of a power struggle between Edwin J. Anderson who at the time was the Lions GM, and D. Lyle Fife to acquire total control of the franchise by buying out the other 144 shareholders for $4.5 million, equivalent to $47.3 million in 2025. The Lions' board of directors approved the transaction on November 22, 1963, and the deal closed on January 10, 1964. During Ford's ownership, he hired sixteen head coaches while the team won 41 percent of their regular-season games, made the playoffs ten times and never appeared in the Super Bowl.

Ford was known for his unwavering loyalty to certain players and individuals. From 1967 until 1989, Ford had Russ Thomas as general manager of the team that saw them win no postseason games in his tenure before he retired. The Lions won a playoff game in the 1992 postseason, the first and only postseason win under Ford Sr. When Ford Sr approached player-turned-broadcaster Matt Millen about becoming team CEO and de facto general manager in the spring of 2000, Millen initially responded by saying he wasn't qualified before Ford responded "You're smart. You'll figure it out." He rejected the offer only to accept when offered the position again the following year. The team went 31–84 from 2001 until Week 3 of the 2008 season before Millen was fired (that year, the Lions would lose every game of the season). The decision to fire him only occurred when Ford's son came out in the media to publicly state that he would change general managers if he could do so. At the time of his death, he had the second-longest tenure among current owners next to Ralph Wilson. Ford was honored with a patch for the 2014 season. Three years later, the team went through a uniform re-design that saw Ford's initials placed on the left sleeve of the jersey that stayed on until the 2024 season.

Ford also served as chairman of the short-lived Detroit Cougars (1967–1968), a professional soccer team, which played in the USA and NASL leagues.

== Death ==
Ford died of pneumonia, five days before his 89th birthday, at his home in Grosse Pointe Shores, Michigan, on March 9, 2014. He is buried in Woodlawn Cemetery in Detroit, near his parents and elder brother, Benson.

== See also ==
- Ford family

Sporting positions
Preceded by Detroit Football Company	Detroit Lions principal owner 1964–2014	Succeeded by Martha Firestone Ford
