= Martha Firestone Ford =

American businesswoman (born 1925)

- Born: Martha Parke Firestone; September 16, 1925 (age 101); Cleveland, Ohio, U.S.
- Education: Vassar College (AB)
- Years active: 2014–2020
- Known for: Former owner and chairwoman of the Detroit Lions
- Spouse: William Clay Ford Sr. (m. 1947; died 2014)
- Children: 4, including Sheila Ford Hamp and William Clay Ford Jr.
- Parents: Harvey S. Firestone Jr. (father); Elizabeth Parke (mother)

Martha Firestone Ford (born Martha Parke Firestone; September 16, 1925) is an American businesswoman and former principal owner and chairperson of the Detroit Lions of the National Football League (NFL). Ford is also on the board of the Henry Ford Health System.

== Early life and education ==
Born September 16, 1925 in Cleveland, Ohio, Firestone is the daughter of Harvey S. Firestone Jr. and Elizabeth Parke Firestone. Her paternal grandparents are Firestone Tire and Rubber Co. founder Harvey S. Firestone and his wife, Idabelle Smith Firestone.

She graduated from Our Lady of the Elms High School in Akron in 1943. She graduated from Vassar College in 1946.

== Detroit Lions ==
On March 9, 2014, Martha's husband William Clay Ford Sr. died at age 88. He had been the sole owner of the Lions since he bought out all other owners in 1963 for US$4.5 million. On March 10, 2014, it was announced that controlling interest in the Lions would pass to her. She was the majority owner of the team, with each of her four children holding small shares in the team.

Ford was one of ten women who owned NFL teams at the end of her tenure. The others are Virginia Halas McCaskey (Chicago Bears), Kim Pegula (Buffalo Bills), Carol Davis (Las Vegas Raiders), Dee Haslam (Cleveland Browns), Amy Adams Strunk (Tennessee Titans), Gayle Benson (New Orleans Saints), Janice McNair (Houston Texans), Denise DeBartolo York (San Francisco 49ers) and Jody Allen (Seattle Seahawks). She stepped down as Lions' owner on June 23, 2020 to be succeeded by her daughter Sheila Ford Hamp.

== Personal life ==
Ford first met her husband, William Clay Ford, a grandson of Henry Ford, at a lunch in New York City arranged and attended by both of their mothers, according to the biography The Fords. She was a Vassar student at the time, and he was a student at St. Mary's U.S. Navy Pre-Flight School. They married on June 21, 1947 at St. Paul's Episcopal Church in Akron, Ohio. By that time both families had acquired considerable wealth, and the matchup between the grandchildren of two empire-builders was reported by numerous news outlets. The Akron Beacon Journal called the Firestone-Ford nuptials "the biggest society wedding in Akron's history" and "the biggest show Akron has seen in years". The couple received gifts from FBI Director J. Edgar Hoover, media publisher John S. Knight, and Mina Miller Edison.

Her husband died in 2014. The couple had four children: Martha Parke Morse (b. 1948), Sheila Ford Hamp (b. 1951), William Clay Ford Jr. (b. 1957), and Elizabeth Ford Kontulis (b. 1961). Her son William was as of 2015 the chairman of the board of directors of Ford Motor Company. He had previously been the chief executive officer and chief operating officer of Ford and is the vice chairman of the Detroit Lions.

Ford has 14 grandchildren and 11 great-grandchildren.

Ford and her immediate family, and several other members of the extended Ford family, have long lived at Grosse Pointe, Michigan. They originally lived in Grosse Pointe Woods after relocating to the Detroit area following their marriage. She has lived in Grosse Pointe Shores since 1960, when she and William had a house built on Lake St. Clair.

She turned 100 years old on September 16th, 2025.

== See also ==
- Ford family (Michigan)

Sporting positions
Preceded by William Clay Ford Sr.	Detroit Lions principal owner 2014–2020	Succeeded by Sheila Ford Hamp
