= Benson Ford =

American automobile industry executive (1919–1978)

- Born: Benson Ford; July 20, 1919; Detroit, Michigan, U.S.
- Died: July 27, 1978 (aged 59); Cheboygan, Michigan, U.S.
- Education: Princeton University (did not graduate)
- Occupation: Automobile executive
- Title: Vice-President of Ford Motor Company; CEO of Lincoln-Mercury Division (1948–1956); Director of Lincoln-Mercury Dealer Policy Board (1956–1978); Chairman of the Board, Edison Institute; Chairman of the Board, Henry Ford Hospital; Co-Chairman, National Conference of Christians and Jews
- Spouse: Edith McNaughton (m. 1941)
- Children: 2
- Parents: Edsel Bryant Ford (father); Eleanor Lowthian Clay (mother)
- Family: Ford

Benson Ford Sr. (July 20, 1919 – July 27, 1978) was an American businessman in the automotive industry, a vice-president of Ford Motor Company, and national co-chairman of the National Conference of Christians and Jews (NCCJ). Benson was the second son of Edsel Ford, and the grandson of Ford Motor Company founder Henry Ford.

Benson Ford remains famous for: being the first prominent person in the Ford family to actively preach religious harmony between faiths through his NCCJ co-chairmanship (in direct contrast to his grandfather Henry Ford); through the internationally famous Benson Ford Research Center in Dearborn, Michigan, which bears his name; and the now historic 1924 Great Lakes freighter Benson Ford Ship named after him, now known as the Benson Ford Shiphouse, in Put-In-Bay, Ohio. Benson was also noteworthy as being the one member of the Ford family most closely associated with Lincoln-Mercury, rather than Ford, where under Benson's guidance the experimental Lincoln Futura car was developed. The Futura later became the most famous and recognizable car in the world for several years, appearing on television as the Batmobile driven by Batman actor Adam West.

In addition to being a vice-president of the Ford Motor Company and Lincoln-Mercury director, Benson was chairman of the Board of the Edison Institute, chairman of the Board of Henry Ford Hospital in Detroit, Michigan, and was the prominent key national co-chairman of the National Conference of Christians and Jews, an organization espousing religious tolerance which evolved into one of the most important religious tolerance organizations in the United States today. He was a vice-president of the Ford Motor Company, chief director of the Lincoln-Mercury division from 1948 to 1956, and director of the Lincoln-Mercury (Fomoco) Dealer Policy Board from 1956 to 1978. He also served on the Ford Motor Company Board of Directors. Benson Ford was president of the Ford Motor Company Fund, a non-profit that makes substantial contributions to charitable activities, from 1961 until his death.

== Early life and education ==
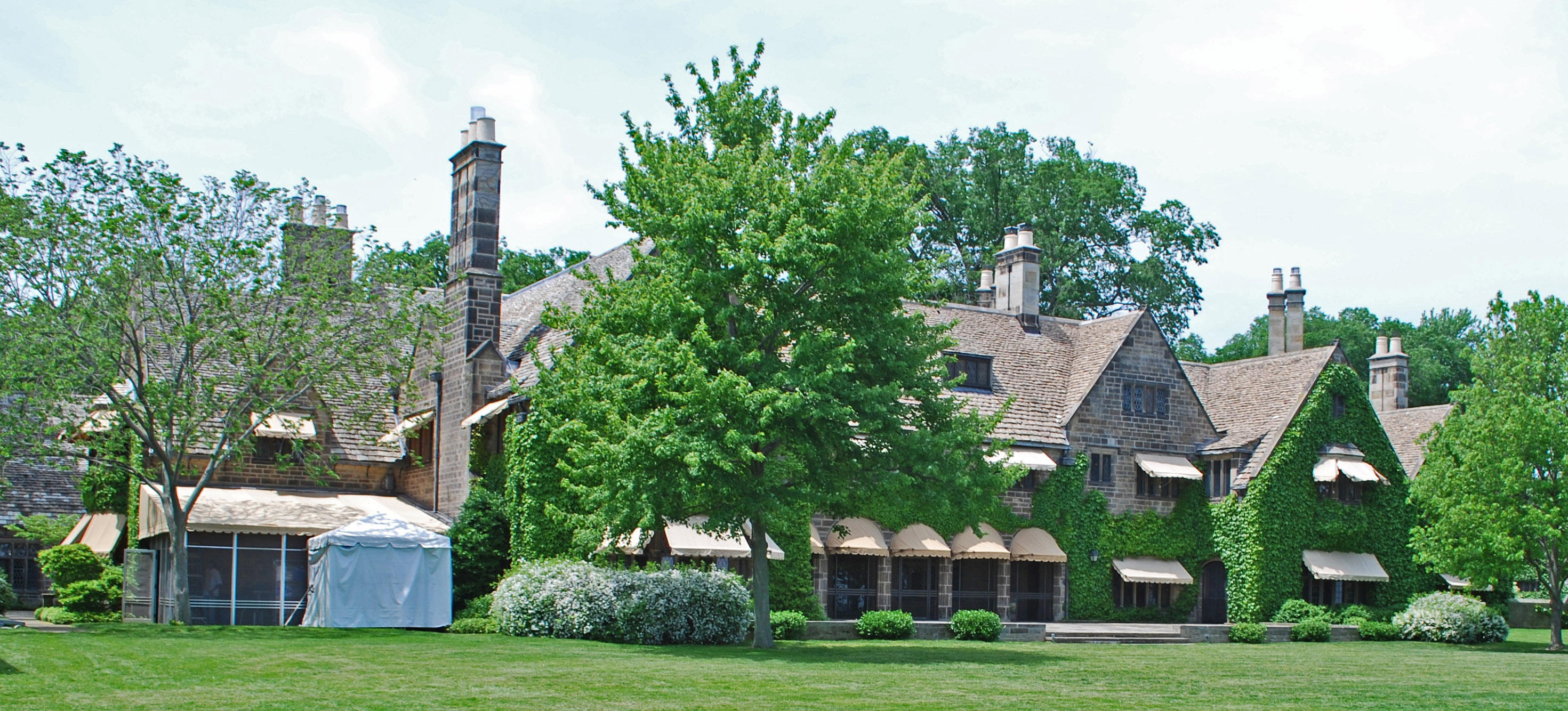
Edsel Ford family home on Lake St. Clair

Benson Ford was born in Detroit, Michigan, to Eleanor Clay Ford and Edsel Ford on July 20, 1919. He, his brothers Henry II and William, and sister Josephine, grew up in Indian Village, and at the Ford's Gaukler Point estate in Grosse Pointe Shores, Michigan, on Lake St. Clair. Benson's early education was at the Liggett School and the Detroit University School (his father's alma mater) before attending the Hotchkiss Academy in Connecticut, graduating in 1938. The family would travel to Europe together every few years. Winters were often spent at their residence in Hobe Sound, Florida (north of Palm Beach). In the summer the family traveled by private rail car to their oceanside estate at Seal Harbor, Maine.

While growing up, Benson and his siblings spent a lot of time with Henry and Clara Ford at the Ford's Fairlane Estate. Activities included driving gasoline powered cars scaled to their size, camp outs, tree climbing, and tending to a half-acre farm created by Henry for their use. Henry taught them practical, hands on skills. The Fords also built them a cottage scaled to their size which was filled with presents for the children each Christmas. Inside the mansion, they enjoyed the bowling alley and indoor pool. The fun continued on Ford Motor Company property. Henry II and Benson were given the use of Henry's chauffeur. They were allowed to run riot with Henry's blessing and encouragement. They drove trains at the Rouge. On Saturdays they would go with Henry to the engineering laboratory where they would drive Model Ts inside the building and shuffle time cards. One time they took over the cash register in the cafeteria and gave out money to employees.

== Early days at Ford Motor Company ==
After attending Hotchkiss, Benson was accepted by Princeton University and attended Princeton for two years, but opted to leave college early to begin his career at Ford Motor Company. In his early years at Ford, he first worked in the experimental garage with Henry II at the Ford Engineering Laboratory starting in the dynamometer room testing engines. Ford Engineer Lawrence Sheldrick, said that the boys, "didn't pull any punches about getting their hands dirty ... and their clothes all messed up". While in the Engineering Lab they worked for Leonard Williams, a no-nonsense black foreman who taught them how to tear apart engines. During Benson's early days as an engineer at Ford, he helped build one of the company's first experimental jeeps, along with his brother, Henry Ford II. Sheldrick took Edsel to watch the tests of the first completed jeep model, and arranged for Henry and Benson to drive it out of a patch of tall grass and underbrush right up to their father. "He got the biggest bang out of that ... He was awfully proud of his boys." Sheldrick commented. Benson later moved around to different departments. His father believed the boys need to learn as many aspects of the company as possible from the "concrete floor up". This became the guiding premise when new Ford family members enter the company. In his final stockholder meeting in 1979 Henry Ford II summed up the approach "the ownership of Class B stock is no passport to a top position in Ford ... It confers no special privilege ... If any other member of my family achieves a senior position the company, it will be through merit ...There are no Crown Princes in the Ford Motor Company".

== Personal life ==
Benson married Edith McNaughton, also of Grosse Pointe, daughter of Lynn McNaughton, a former vice president and general manager at motor car rival Cadillac, on July 9, 1941, in Christ Church Detroit. Miss McNaughton lived next door to the Fords in Detroit, and they attended kindergarten together. The couple had two children: Benson Jr. and Lynn. They made their home in Grosse Pointe Shores, Michigan. The Fords enjoyed boating and owned several boats, including a succession of yachts named Onika.

Benson was an active photographer and golfer. He loved racing and drove the Indianapolis 500 pace car three times. He drove a Mercury in the 1950 race, a Mustang in 1964, and a Comet Cyclone GT in 1966.

Benson suffered from angina, a painful heart condition. After a 1957 heart attack, Benson remained in relatively ill health in his last two decades, until his final heart attack in 1978. Like his brothers, Benson also struggled with alcoholism.

== World War II service ==
During World War II, Benson was twice rejected from service as status 4-F, due to blindness in his left eye. However, Benson persisted in his desire to serve his country and would not give up. Despite his left eye blindness, Benson insisted and persisted, and was finally allowed to enlist in the United States Army in 1942, as a private. Benson completed officer's candidate school in Fargo, North Dakota, and was commissioned a second lieutenant in June 1943. In December 1943 Benson was stationed in San Francisco at the Fourth Air Force Headquarters. Shortly thereafter he was made aide-de-camp to Brigadier General Samuel M. Connell and was transferred into the Army Air Corps. In October 1944 Benson was transferred to the Newfoundland Base Command of the United States Air Corps for 13 months. Through meritorious service Benson eventually achieved the rank of captain in January 1945. This was the highest rank achieved by any member of the Ford family. When his father Edsel, Ford Motor Company president, died of cancer on May 26, 1943 (during the war), Benson continued his service in the Army for the duration of the war. His brother Henry Ford II, then in the United States Navy, was honorably discharged from the service after his father's death to take over leadership at Ford Motor Company on request of the United States government. Henry II assumed the presidency of Ford on September 21, 1945. Benson Ford was named a vice-president of the Ford Motor Company at a Ford Motor Company meeting on June 1, 1943. Captain Ford separated from the Army in February 1946, honorably discharged at the end of all wartime hostilities, and came home. Once he left the Army, Benson returned to Ford Motor Company.

== Return to Ford ==
After World War II, Ford was re-organized in the image of General Motors into profit centers and a line and staff components. On January 30, 1948, Benson was elected a vice president of the company and appointed the director of the newly formed Lincoln-Mercury Division, carrying on in his father's foot-steps. In October of the same year, he was named general manager of the division. He joined his brothers Henry Ford II who was named Ford President in 1945, and William, who in 1955 became head of the Continental Division. Together, they shattered the belief that the third generation kills companies. Together, they modernized the company and re-stored Ford's pre-war glory. As his health declined Benson became Chairman of the Lincoln-Mercury (Fomoco) Dealer Policy Board. Benson was very supportive of Henry II and always had the company's best interest at heart. The Policy Board position was an ideal fit given his experience with Lincoln-Mercury and his personality. Benson was good-natured, a consummate charmer, and could make anyone feel like his friend. While Henry ran the company Benson became the Ford that pressed the flesh. He loved to travel. Benson was good humored and was astute at remembering names of people, as well as their wives' and children.

== Lincoln-Mercury highlights ==
Benson Ford was involved with the development of the 1949 Ford. The 1949 is often described by historians as "The car that saved Ford Motor Company". It was Ford's first vehicle not based on a pre-war design. Benson was on the committee that selected the final Eugene Gregorie design. The car was unique for its "fenderless" design and its large flat side panels. Benson explained the positioning of Mercury in the market in 1950, "From the viewpoint of the total Ford Motor Company, what should Ford owners graduate to? The next logical choice would be a Mercury." The Mercury version was unique from the Ford and the sleek, rakish design was based on upscale Lincoln products. It just looked fast. It was. The 1949 Mercury took sales from 47,142 Mercury cars in 1948 to 301,319 for 1949, a nine-fold improvement. The 1949–1951 Mercury with 110 HP was a favorite with young car enthusiasts. The large side panels were also perfect for after-market customization and the engine was easily modified to improve performance. Benson Ford accomplished the goal of making Mercury competitive in the medium priced car markets. Benson drove a 1950 Mercury convertible as the Indianapolis 500 pace car in 1950. Ford sold nearly a million Mercurys in three years. The Mercury also got a boost in 1955 when the coupe version was featured in the film, Rebel Without a Cause, starring James Dean. During his tenure Mercury introduced several innovations. The 1955 Montclair Sun Valley featured a tinted plexiglass panel for the front half of the roof and the Mercury Monterrey was offered with a vinyl roof.

== Racing ==
On the Lincoln side, 1953, Benson oversaw a dramatic increase in horsepower from 160 to 205. This made Lincoln the first American production car since the 1920s to exceed the 200 hp barrier. Benson Ford made the decision to partner with Bill Stroup to enter a team of 1953 Lincolns in the 1952 Pan-American Road Race. It was a 1934 mile trek considered to be one of the toughest races on the planet. Lincolns capture first, second and fourth in the touring division of the race that year. Not content, Benson brought the winning driver to meet with Ford engineers to identify areas for improvement. With the improvements Lincoln captured the first four spots in 1954, the last year of the race. Benson's efforts were in keeping with a racing tradition started by his grandfather who beat Henry Winton in the "sweepstakes" race in 1901. Ford also began its NASCAR participation during Benson Ford's tenure with a mixture of Fords and Mercurys. Ford won the Manufacturer's Cup in 1956 and 1957.

== Lincoln Futura concept car ==
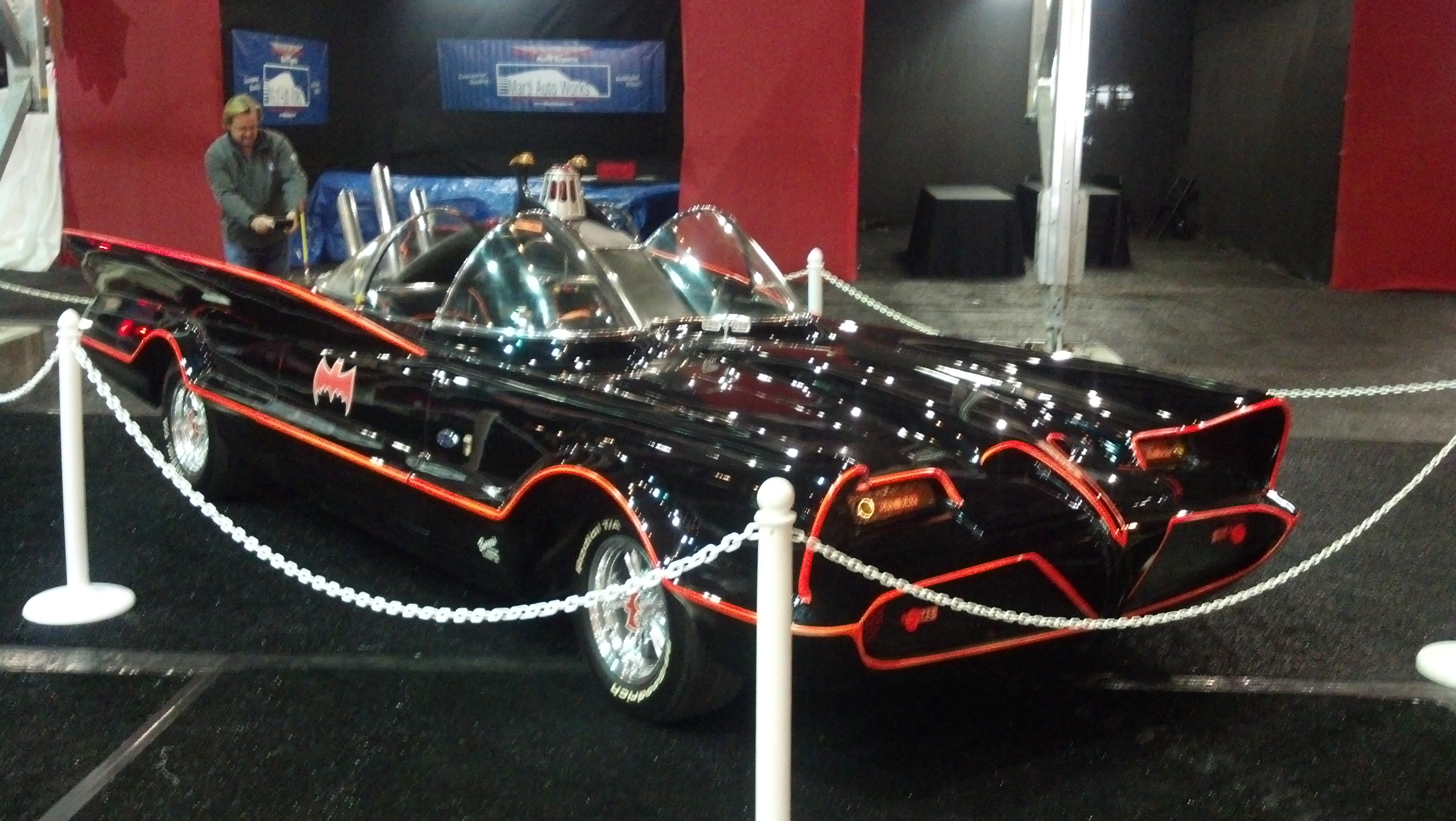
Benson Ford's unique Lincoln Futura, later known as the Batmobile, briefly became the most famous car in the world.

The Lincoln Futura, an experimental concept car, was designed by William M. Schmidt at Lincoln-Mercury and hand-built by Ghia in Italy for 250,000 dollars. It was shown at 1955 auto shows and featured push-button transmission controls, a 300-horsepower V-8 engine and powertrain, a Lincoln Mark II chassis, and a double-dome canopy roof. Lincoln-Mercury opted not to mass-produce the Futura, but Benson Ford drove it in New York City and exhibited it at auto shows across the United States, where it appeared in newsreels.

Hollywood customizer George Barris took notice, and eventually bought the Futura from Ford in 1959. A few years later, Benson Ford's Lincoln Futura would become world famous again as Barris turned Benson Ford's Futura car from pearlescent white to black color, and into the original Batmobile for the new 1966-1968 Batman television series. In 1966, the new Batman became one of the first television series produced in full color by William Dozier, with the Lincoln Futura driven by Batman actor Adam West, briefly making the Lincoln Futura Batmobile the most famous and recognizable car in the world, and making unknown Batman actor Adam West the best known television actor in the world because of the car he drove in bat costume, along with his front seat costumed masked sidekick Robin, unknown actor Burt Ward. In 2013, Barris sold the original Benson Ford Futura Car turned Batmobile for 4.6 million dollars.

== Death of Henry Ford ==
After the death of his grandfather Henry Ford on April 7, 1947, at Fair Lane, Benson Ford was seen exiting The Episcopal Cathedral Church of St. Paul (Detroit) holding the arm of his widowed grandmother Clara Ford from the funeral service on April 10, 1947.

== Charitable activities ==
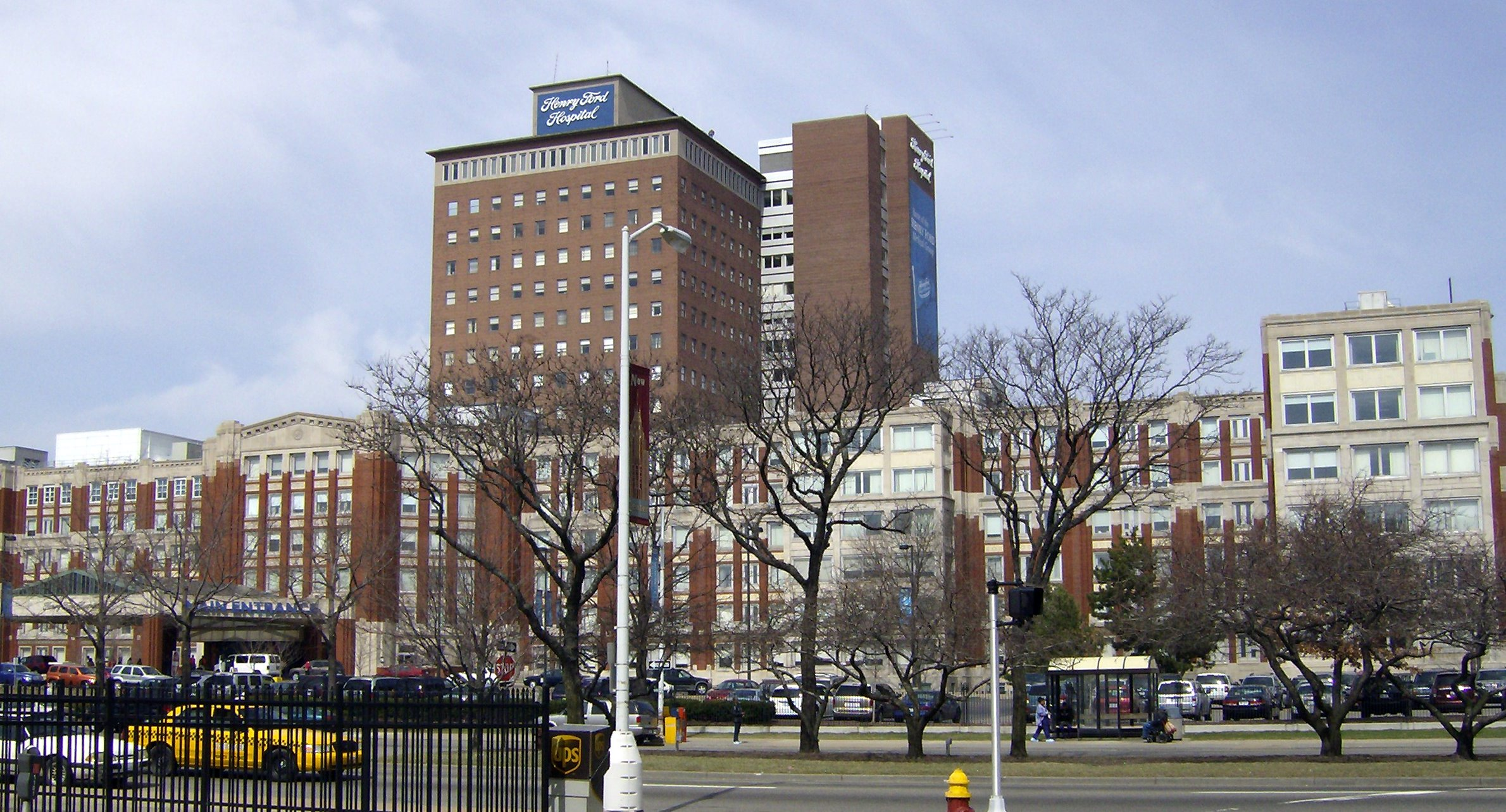
Henry Ford Hospital in Detroit, Michigan

As Vice-President of the Ford Motor Company, Benson and his wife Edith were involved in many prominent charities and civic organizations, including the YMCA, Boy Scouts, and, with wife Edith, the United Torch Fund Drives. Mr. and Mrs. Ford were extremely active in the United Community Funds and Councils of America (now known as the United Way). Benson served as a director for the organization and in 1961 served as the National Chairman of the United Community Campaigns of America. Benson served as a trustee for the Edison Institute, serving as chairman of the board from 1947 to 1951, Henry Ford Hospital Chairman of the Board, Henry Ford Trade School, a Ford Foundation trustee from 1947–1976, and as the Detroit Symphony Orchestra director. He also worked for religious tolerance and in 1951 was named Protestant national co-chair of the National Conference of Christians and Jews.

Benson Ford joined the Henry Ford Hospital Board of Trustees in 1946, and succeeded his grandfather Henry Ford as its president in 1947. As President of the hospital Board of Trustees, Benson was instrumental in securing a one hundred million dollar grant from the Ford Foundation in 1973. One of Benson's primary interests was furthering the advances being made in medical research. The Education and Research Building at Henry Ford Hospital, a large research laboratory facility, was dedicated in his name.

Benson Ford was a director and or chairman for countless organizations including The National Safety Council, the Traffic Safety Association of Detroit, The Automotive Safety Foundation, Greater Detroit Committee for Project Hope, the Dermatology Foundation, the Citizens Conference on State Legislatures and the village of Grosse Pointe Shores. As a reflection of his love of fishing, golf and community Benson Ford was also a member of the Everglades Club in Palm Beach, the Key Largo Anglers club, Country Club of Detroit, Detroit Athletic Club, Detroit Club and Grosse Pointe Club.

== Awards and recognition ==
Mr. Ford received numerous citations for his contributions to religious and racial tolerance. In 1951 he was selected by the Detroit Junior Board of Commerce as the "Outstanding Young Man of 1951". In 1961 Benson received the annual Knight of Charity Award presented by Maryglade College based on "unison in family life with person-to-person charity". In 1963 he received a Distinguished Service Citation by the Automotive Old Timers. This was followed in 1965 by the National Community Service Award of what is now the United Way for his long service at the national level in promoting united giving for community health and welfare services.

== Death and survivors ==
Benson Ford Sr., with a history of heart problems, died of a heart attack on July 27, 1978, a week after his 59th birthday, aboard his yacht "Onika", docked at the resort community of Cheboygan, Michigan (originally an Ojibwe Chippewa Anishinaabe indigenous settlement, later resettled as Duncan City) where he was living at the time, primarily summers, and at other times, on Lake Hudson, near the northern tip of Michigan's Lower Peninsula. His wife Edith was with him on their yacht when he suffered his fatal heart attack. Benson is buried in Woodlawn Cemetery in Detroit, Michigan, with his brother William Clay Ford Sr., chairman of the Board of the Henry Ford Museum and owner of the Detroit Lions football team (died 2014), and sister Josephine Clay Ford, a noted philanthropist (died 2005). However, not his eldest brother Henry Ford II "Hank The Deuce", President, CEO, and chairman of the Board of Directors of Ford Motor Company (died 1987), who was married three times, and who chose instead to be cremated, with his ashes scattered on the Detroit River.

His widow, Edith McNaughton Ford, president and owner of the Key Largo Anglers Club in Key Largo, Florida, and a member of the Board of Trustees of Henry Ford Hospital for 36 years, died in a Detroit hospital after a long illness, reported to be cancer of the throat, on August 9, 1980, age 60, and is buried alongside Benson. After her husband's death, Edith was living on Lake Shore in Grosse Pointe Shores, Michigan. During her final 24 months, she was named executrix of her late husband Benson's will, and eventually inherited $50 million of the $100 million estate. She and the remaining Ford family fought off a $25 million lawsuit against her and members of the family by her son, Benson Ford Jr., who alleged financial mismanagement and sought a seat on the Ford Motor Company Board of Directors. In 1986, at age 36, Benson Ford Jr. went to work at Ford as a management trainee.

Benson's children are still active in the Ford Motor Company as Ford family shareholders. The living Ford family members control the company via ownership of a special class of stock–B shares. The family claims the stock-B shares structure is justified because it takes the long view by focusing on Ford family interests and their continued involvement in Ford Motor Company affairs. Alternatively, many investors would make their stock decisions based on short-term earnings and rapid changes in the share price, a very different perspective. The Ford family owns less than two percent of the company's shares, but controls 40 percent of the voting power through a special class of stock. There are 71 million Class B shares, about three-fourths of which are held in a voting trust. The rest are held by individual family members. The family has a pact that Class B shares put up for sale will first be offered to other family members. Lynn Ford Alandt, Benson Ford Jr., Edsel B. Ford II, William Clay Ford Jr., and Alfred Ford (also known as Ambarish Das) oversee the trust that holds these shares. Benson Ford Sr.'s daughter Lynn Ford Alandt also remains active in Ford family affairs as: Chairman of the Board of Trustees of the Edsel and Eleanor Ford House in Gross Pointe Shores; as a member of the Fair Lane Board of Trustees, home of Henry and Clara Ford now undergoing restoration; as a trustee at The Henry Ford Museum; as President of the Benson and Edith Ford Charitable Fund; and through the Lynn & Paul Alandt Charitable Foundation.

== Historic Benson Ford Shiphouse ==
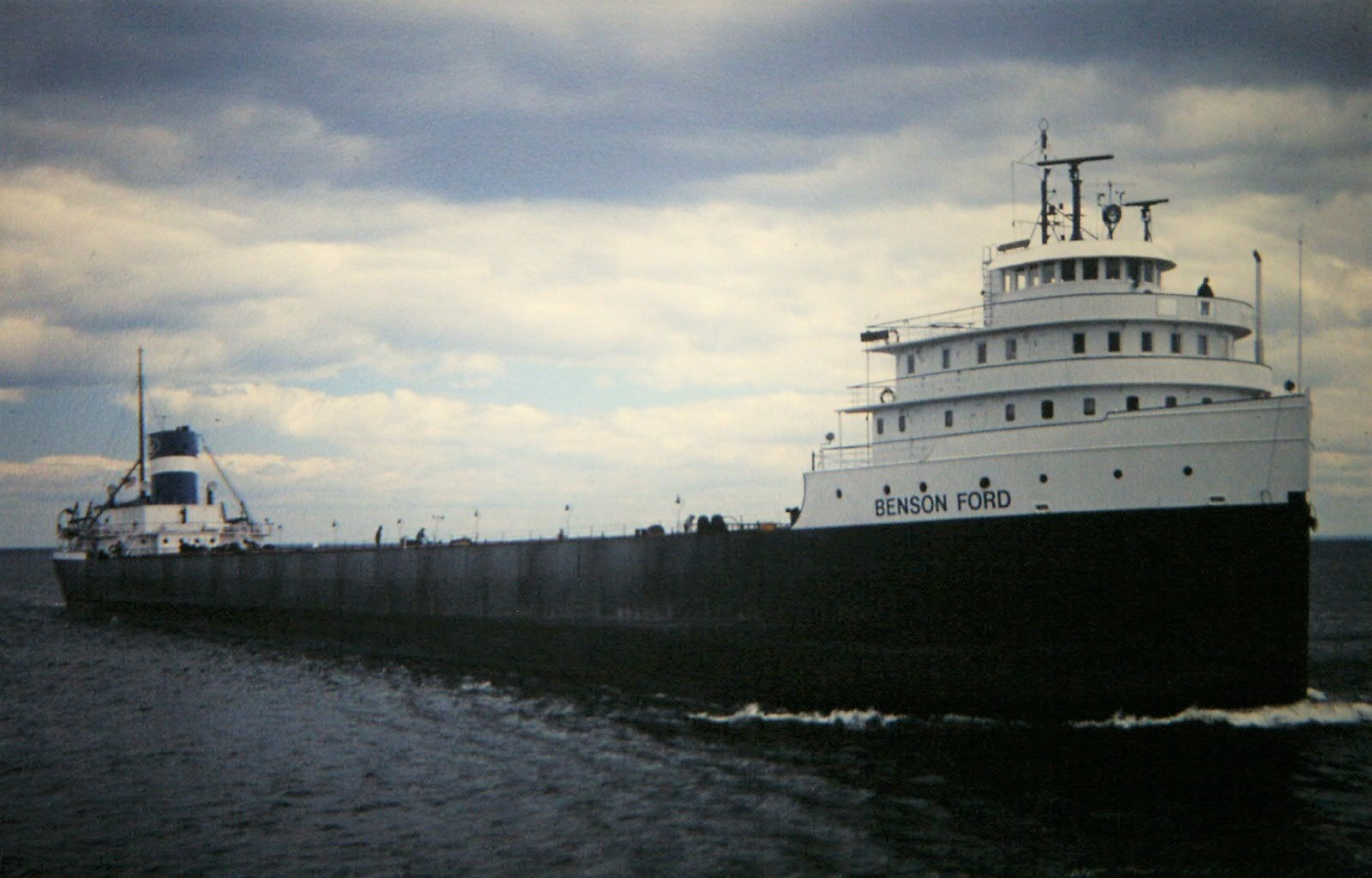
MV Benson Ford in the Duluth Ship Canal in July 1978

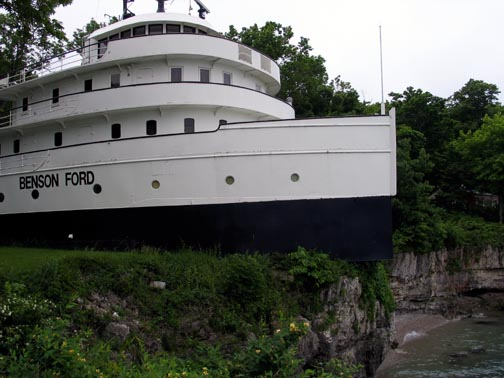
The MV Benson Ford as it sits today on a cliff on South Bass Island, Ohio

Years after his passing, Benson Ford remains famous for the forward cabin and pilothouse of the Great Lakes lake freighter MV Benson Ford named for him, known today as the Benson Ford Shiphouse on South Bass Island, Ohio near the village of Put-In-Bay, Ohio, which has miraculously survived a century of history to become a private summer home (not open to the general public as it is a private residence). In 1924, the MV Benson Ford was built and launched on 26 April 1924 for the Ford Motor Company, designed and used for transporting iron ore and other materials across the Great Lakes. Powered by a 3,000 bhp, four-cylinder, two-stroke, single-acting Sun-Doxford opposed piston diesel engine, 23 5/8" bore x 45 5/8" stroke per piston (91 ¼" total combined stroke), built by the Great Lakes Engineering Works in Ecorse, Michigan. Her sister ship (and nearly identical), the MV Henry Ford II was also finished in 1924 and was built by the American Shipbuilding Company of Lorain, Ohio. The MV Benson Ford had rated service speeds of 11 knots or 12.7 miles per hour. The maiden voyage of the MV Benson Ford took place on 2 August 1924, with a coal load from Toledo, Ohio, being transported to Duluth, Minnesota, and then returning to the Ford Rouge plant in Dearborn, Michigan, with a load of iron ore.

The MV Benson Ford made news when it ran aground twice in 1959. It was sold in 1981 to Frank J. Sullivan Jr., and renamed the MV John Dykstra II, later the MV Frank J. Sullivan. After being stripped of salvageable parts, Sullivan, Jr. had originally intended to salvage the ship, and rebuild the MV Benson Ford as a refurbished barge. In 1992, Sullivan, Jr. decided to rebuild the ship into a vacation bed & breakfast. When licensing for the potential unique ship inn could not be obtained, the MV Benson Ford was resold five years later as a private island residence.

The Benson Ford Shiphouse, once again renamed the Benson Ford, was renovated to be lived in as a private home. A four-story summer home, the ship has 7000 square feet of living space, and includes five bedrooms, a living room, five full bathrooms, a garage, family room, dining room, a galley, a garage, and the pilothouse lookout. It is sometimes rented for private functions. The Benson Ford Shiphouse can be seen on a cliff at a distance on land by individuals traveling to Put-In-Bay village on South Bass Island riding the Miller Ferry. The Shiphouse is now owned by the Kasper family of Sandusky, Ohio

== Benson Ford Research Center at Henry Ford Museum ==
In honor of his dedication to the Edison Institute, Ford's living children, Benson Ford Jr. and Lynn Ford Alandt, provided major financial support to establish the Benson Ford Research Center at the Henry Ford Museum, also known as the Henry Ford Museum of American Innovation in Dearborn, Michigan. The Benson Ford Research Center is internationally known to automobile historians and auto buffs alike and houses comprehensive research resources, stories of the late Henry Ford and the history of the automobile industry and American innovation. On-staff research experts maintain, interpret and enhance the collections.

== Time magazine cover ==
On May 18, 1953, the three sons of the late Edsel Ford were depicted on the cover of Time driving in a Ford convertible, with Benson Ford (at left), William Ford (at center) and Henry Ford II driving (at right) with the caption "Benson, William & Henry Ford. One more car to pass on the road ahead." In the rear, on the road, behind the Ford car with the three Ford grandchildren, at a far distance away, the late Ford Motor Company founder Henry Ford is depicted driving his original open top 1896 Quadricycle, which started the auto revolution. The Time cover is significant because it confirms the ongoing prominence, importance, influence, involvement, and equal significance of all three of Henry Ford's male grandchildren at Ford in the developmental future of the Ford Motor Company.
