= Mayapur =

Village in Nadia district, West Bengal

- Village
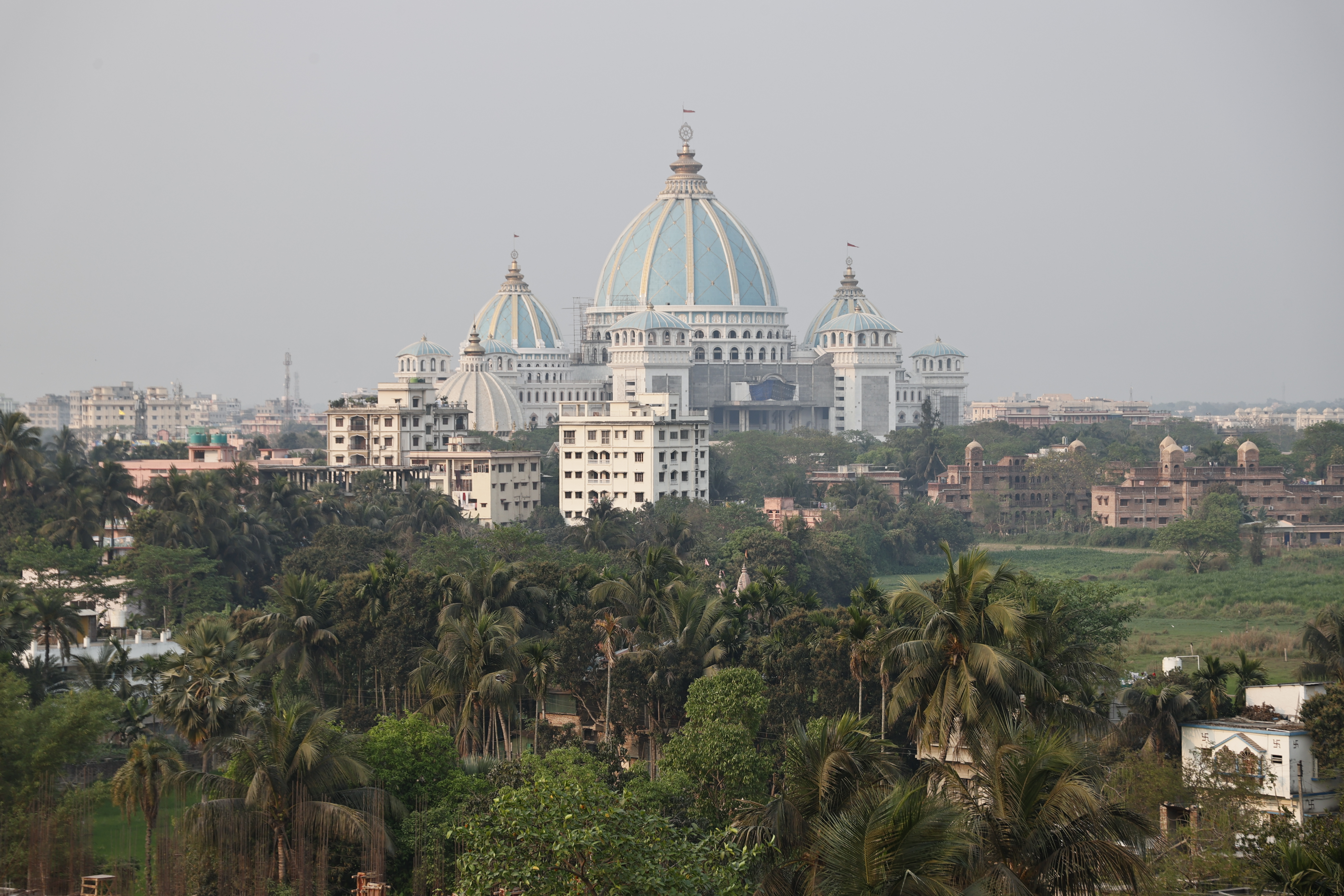
- Chandrodaya Mandir of Mayapur

- Location in West Bengal, India
- Coordinates: 23.4382755°N 88.3928686°E
- Country: India
- State: West Bengal
- District: Nadia

Languages
  - Official: Bengali, English
- Time zone: UTC+5:30 (IST)
- PIN: 741313
- Telephone code: 91 3472

Mayapur (Mayāpura) is a pilgrimage town in the Nabadwip CD block in the Krishnanagar Sadar subdivision of the Nadia district, West Bengal, India. It is situated at the confluence of the Jalangi River and the Bhagirathi, a distributary of the Ganges. The area is considered spiritually significant by followers and devotees of Gaudiya Vaishnavism.

== Etymology ==
The name Mayapur is derived from Miyapur (Bengali: মিঞাপুর [Miñāpura]), which is the Bengali name of a village known for being settled by Muslim fishermen. The name Miyapur was mentioned in various government documents, including maps and surveys.

== History ==
Nabadwip-Mayapur
R: temple, F: facility, H: historical site
Owing to space constraints in the small map, the actual locations in a larger map may vary slightly

The region is associated with Chaitanya Mahaprabhu, a known figure in Gaudiya Vaishnavism. Followers of Gaudiya Vaishnavism believe that Krishna appeared along with his brother Balarama, as Chaitanya Mahaprabhu and Nityananda Prabhu.

== Temples and memorials ==
There are several Gaudiya Vaishnava organizations in Mayapur. The headquarters of the International Society for Krishna Consciousness (ISKCON) is also situated here. The town is heavily centered on this particular Vaishnava religious tradition, with temples devoted to Radha and Krishna or Gaura-Nitai throughout.

In the 1880s, at the birth site of Chaitanya Mahaprabhu, Bhaktivinoda Thakur established the Yogapith temple, a white ornate structure with a pyramidal pointed dome standing on the bank of a pond and surrounded by trees.

The Gaudiya-Vaishnava devotees every year circumambulate the various places of Lord Chaitanya's pastimes in the group of nine islands known as Nabadwip. This Parikrama (circumambulation) takes about 7 days. This event takes place around the Gaur Purnima Festival (Appearance Day of Lord Sree Chaitanya Mahaprabhu). Devotees from all over the world come to Mayapur for this auspicious Parikrama to celebrate the Lord's Divine Appearance Day.

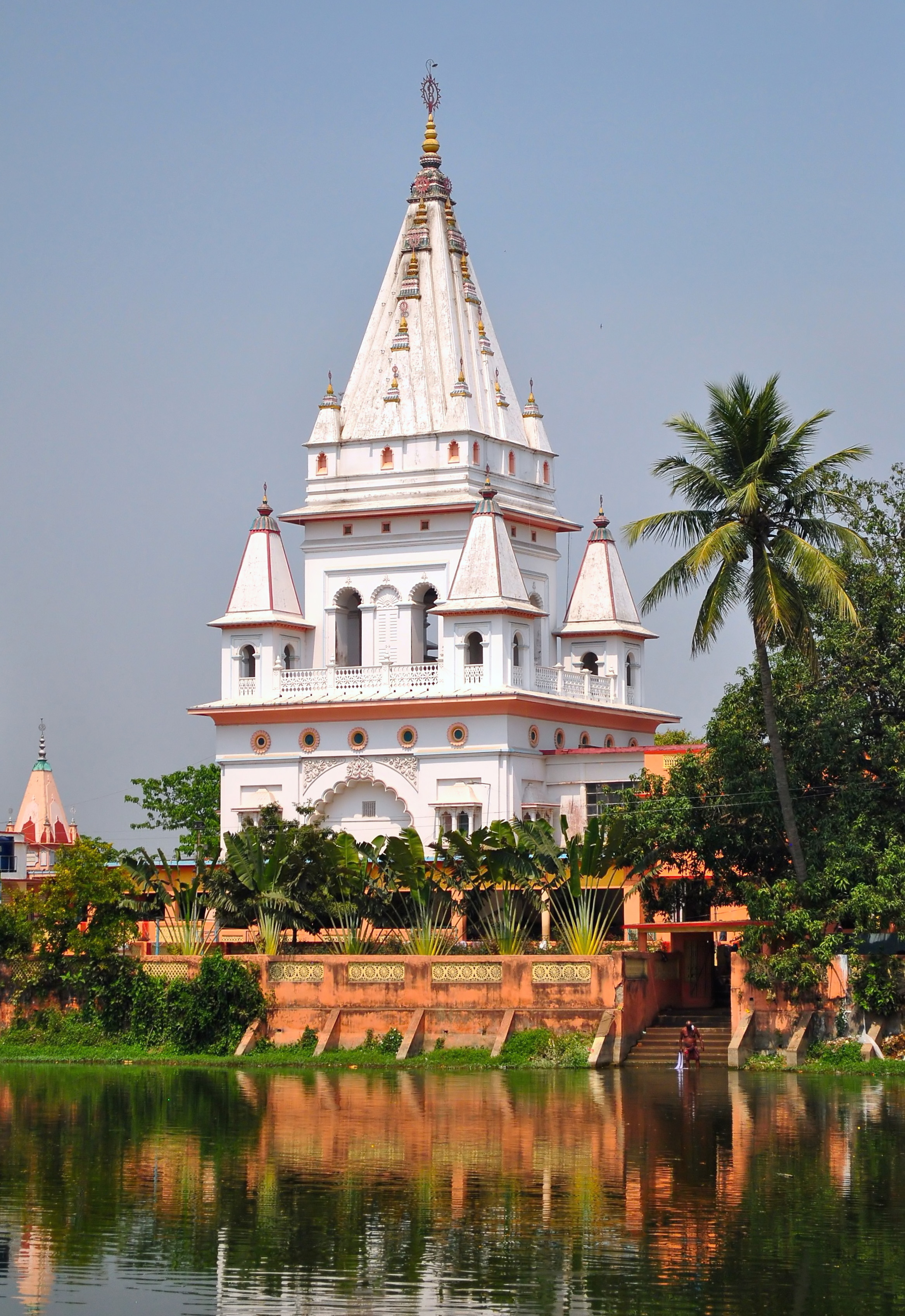
Yogapith temple at Mayapur, established by Bhaktivinoda Thakur in the 1880s.

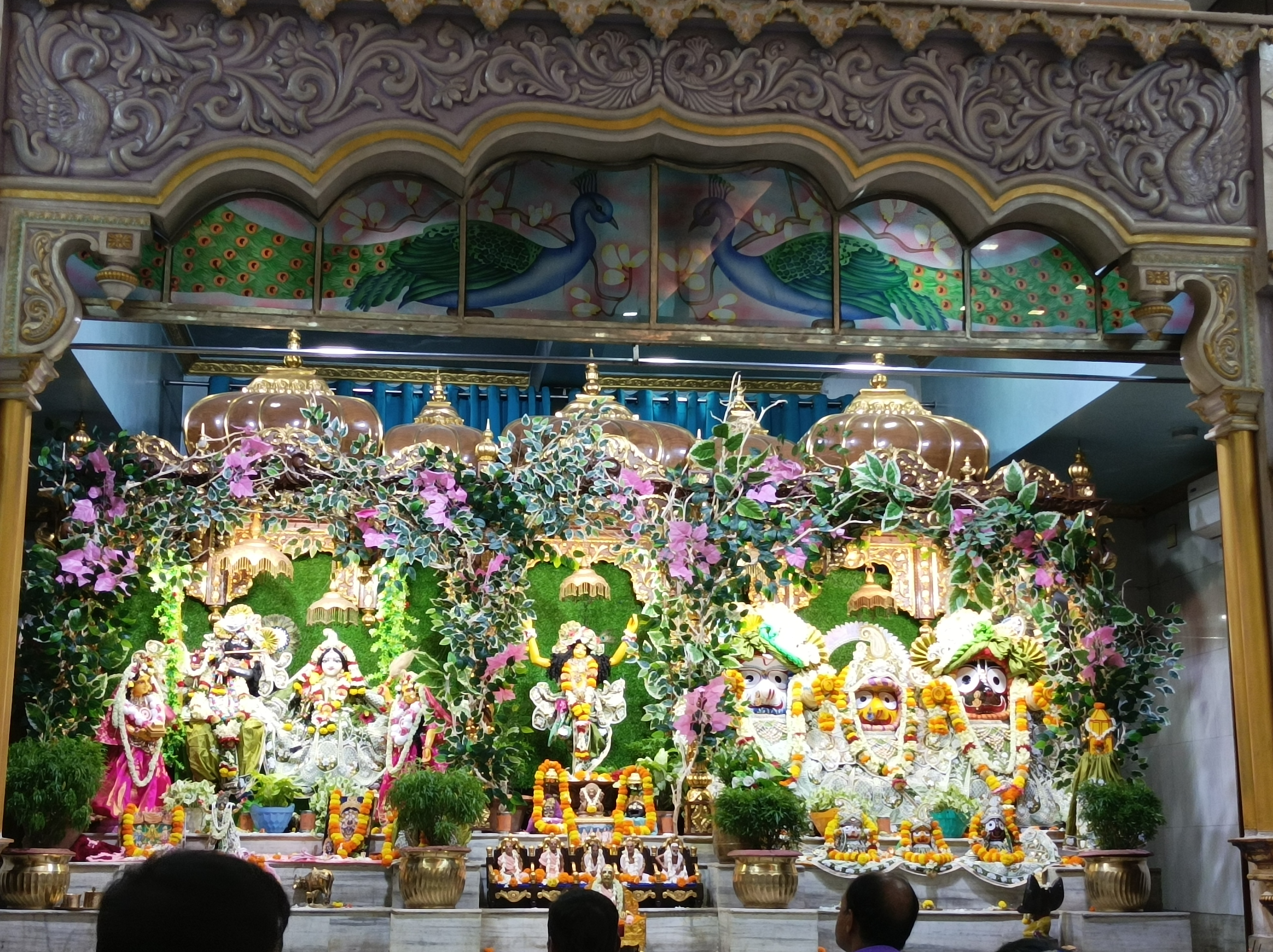
Idols of Sri Sri Radha Madhava, Jagannath, Balarama, Subhadra and Chaitanya Mahaprabhu at the Temple of the Vedic Planetarium (ISKCON Mayapur).

== Transport ==
Kolkata is approximately 100 km from Mayapur. The nearest airport is Netaji Subhas Chandra Bose International Airport. The region can be accessed by road and rail, and the nearest railway station is Nabadwip Dham.There are local trains from howrah regularly

== Gallery ==
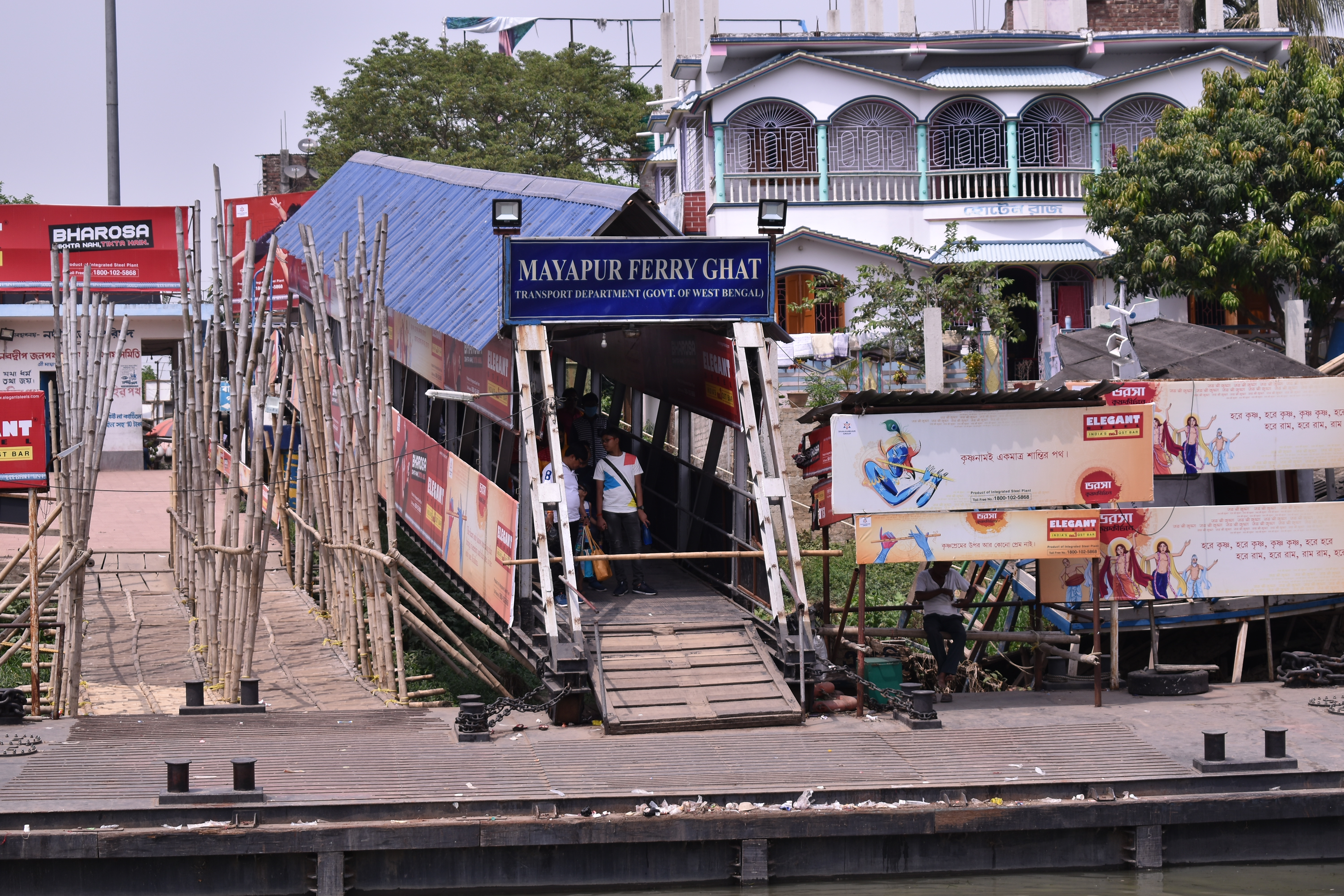
Mayapur Ferry ghat

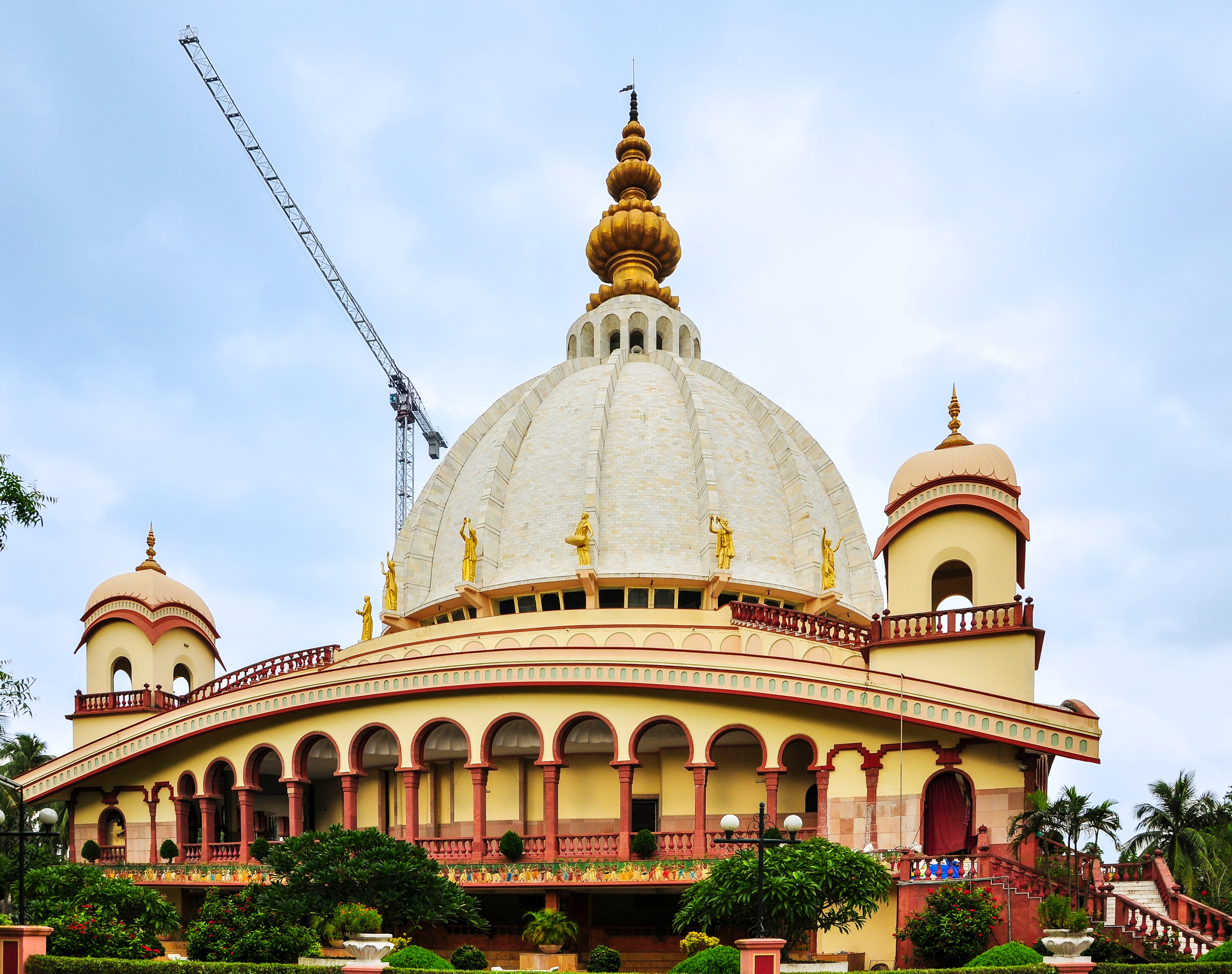
Samadhi Mandir of Srila Prabhupada

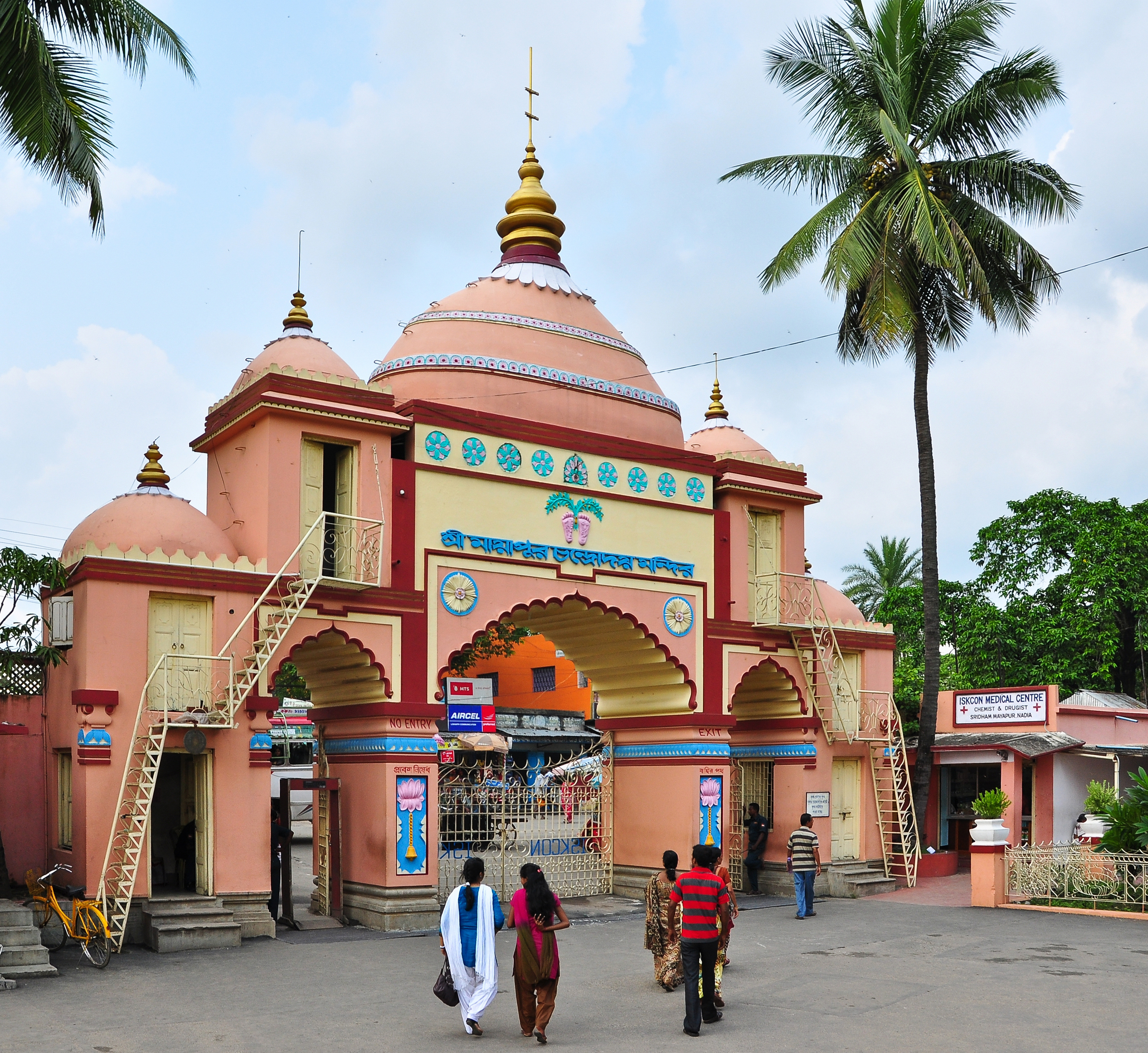
Main gate of ISKCON Mayapur

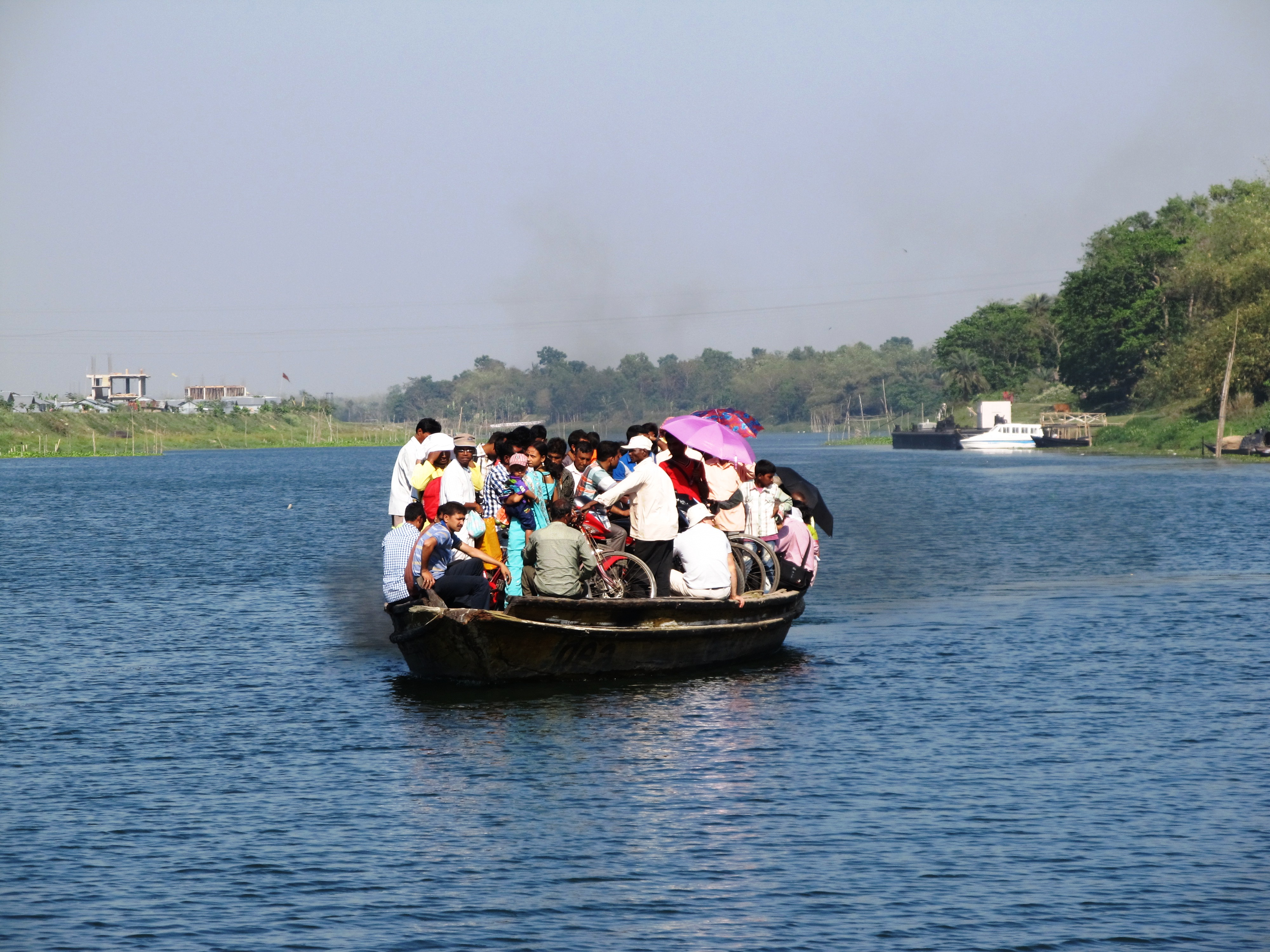
The Ganges river at Mayapur

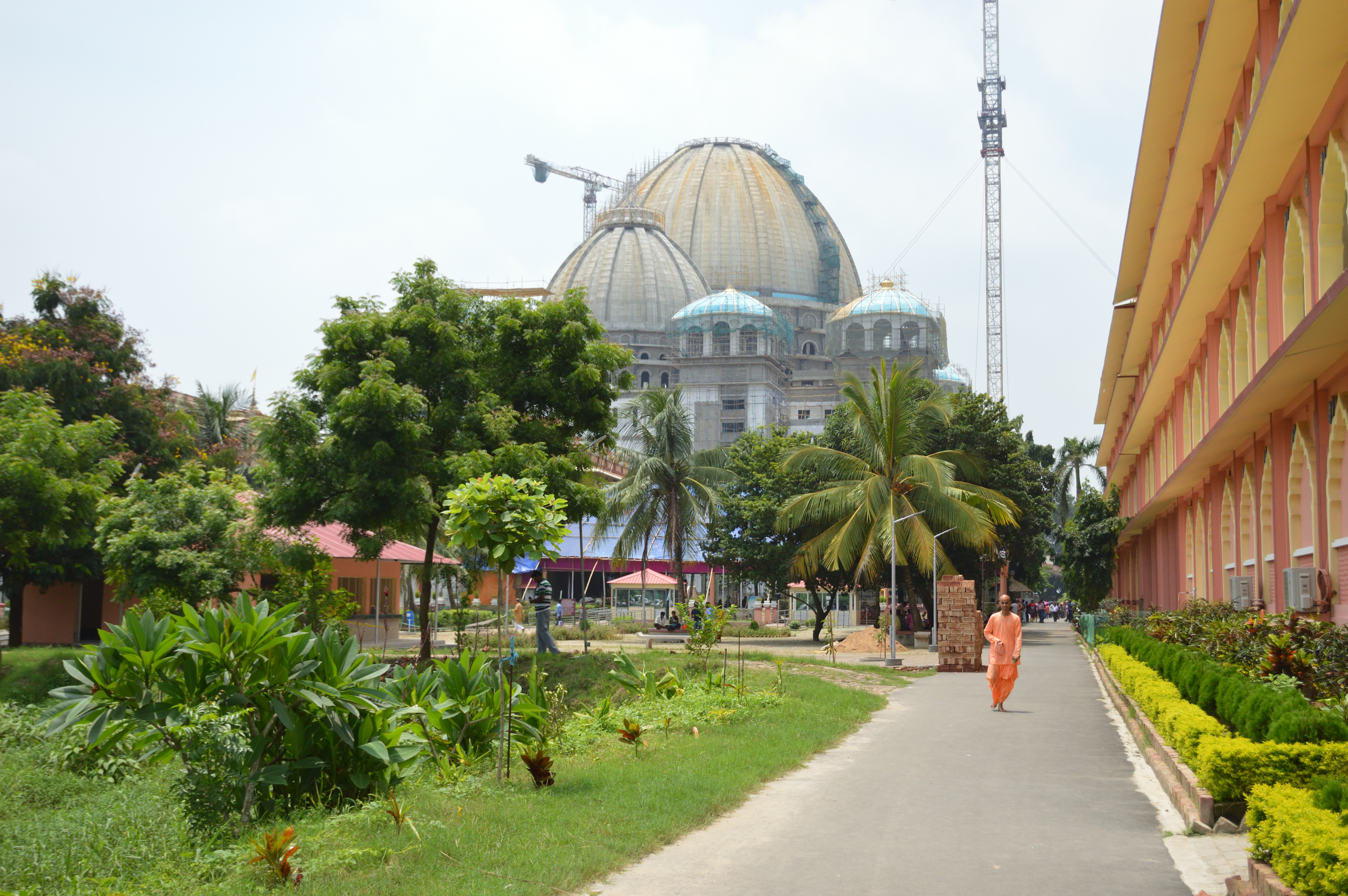
ISKCON Campus

== See also ==
- Nabadwip
- Nrisingha Temple, Nadia
- Nityananda
- Vrindavan
- Temple of the Vedic Planetarium
