= Temple of the Vedic Planetarium =

Hindu temple complex in India

Coordinates: 23.4249°N 88.3892°E

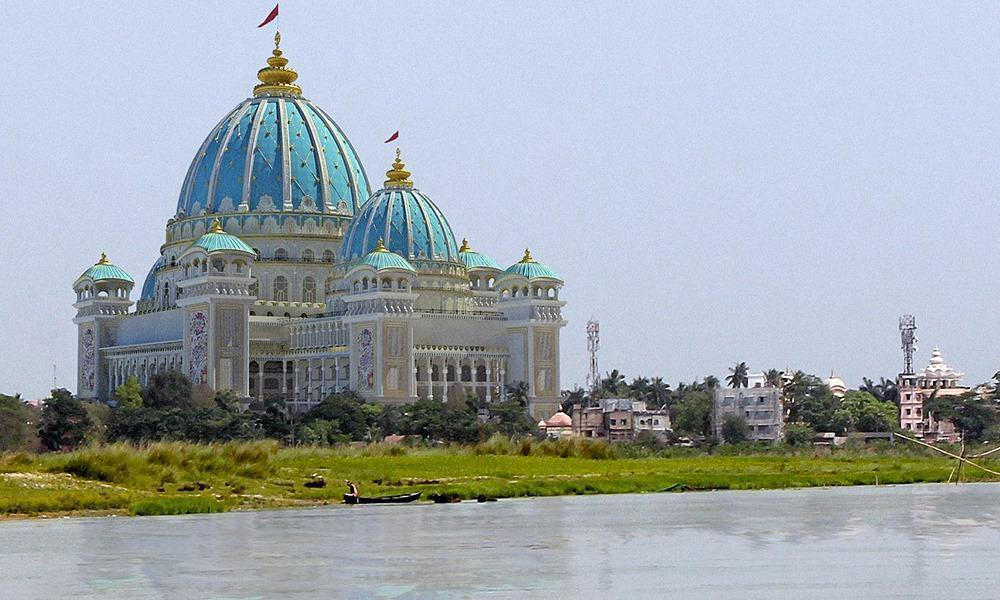
- View of the Mayapur Chandrodaya Mandir in the complex from the Ganges.

Religion
- Affiliation: Hinduism
- Festivals: Gaura Purnima; Chandan Yatra; Ratha Yatra; Radhashtami
- Governing body: ISKCON

Location
- Location: Mayapur
- State: West Bengal
- Country: India
- Interactive map of Temple of the Vedic Planetarium

Architecture
- Founder: A. C. Bhaktivedanta Swami Prabhupada

Website
- tovp.org

The Temple of the Vedic Planetarium is a modern Hindu temple and planetarium complex under construction since 2009 in Mayapur, West Bengal, India. Serving as the global headquarters of the International Society for Krishna Consciousness (ISKCON), the temple is of particular significance to followers of Gaudiya Vaishnavism, a tradition associated with Chaitanya Mahaprabhu. The complex includes the Sri Mayapur Chandrodaya Mandir, one of the main temples within the premises, which is dedicated to the worship of the Pancha Tattva deities, Radha Madhava along with the Ashta-sakhis, and Narasimha. Upon completion, it will be the largest religious monument in the world, with its opening scheduled for 2027. The project chair is Alfred Brush Ford, also known as Ambarish Das, a great-grandson of Henry Ford and an initiated disciple of Srila Prabhupada.

== Location ==
The complex is in the Ganges Delta region at the confluence of the Ganges and Jalangi rivers in the Nadia district of the Indian state West Bengal. The area is located 11 metres (36 ft) above the mean sea level. Ganges flows on the western side of the temple premises, while Jalangi river flows on the southern side. The Temple of the Vedic Planetarium is part of the ISKCON complex in Mayapur, identified by Bhaktivinoda Thakur in 1894 as the true birthplace of Chaitanya Mahaprabhu. A. C. Bhaktivedanta Swami Prabhupada founded Mayapur as a place of pilgrimage in the 20th century.

== Architecture ==
The temple complex consists of several buildings and structures, namely the Sri Sri Radha Madhava Mandir, Srila Prabhupada's Pushpa Samadhi Mandir and Srila Prabhupada's Bhajan Kutir. Also a large temple under construction named Temple of the Vedic Planetarium belongs to the Mayapur Chandradoya Mandir premises.

The Temple of the Vedic Planetarium's blue dome, inspired by the Capitol Building, features intricate Vedic cosmological elements like Mount Meru and a "universal chandelier", symbolizing a unique fusion of architecture and spirituality.

== Shrines ==
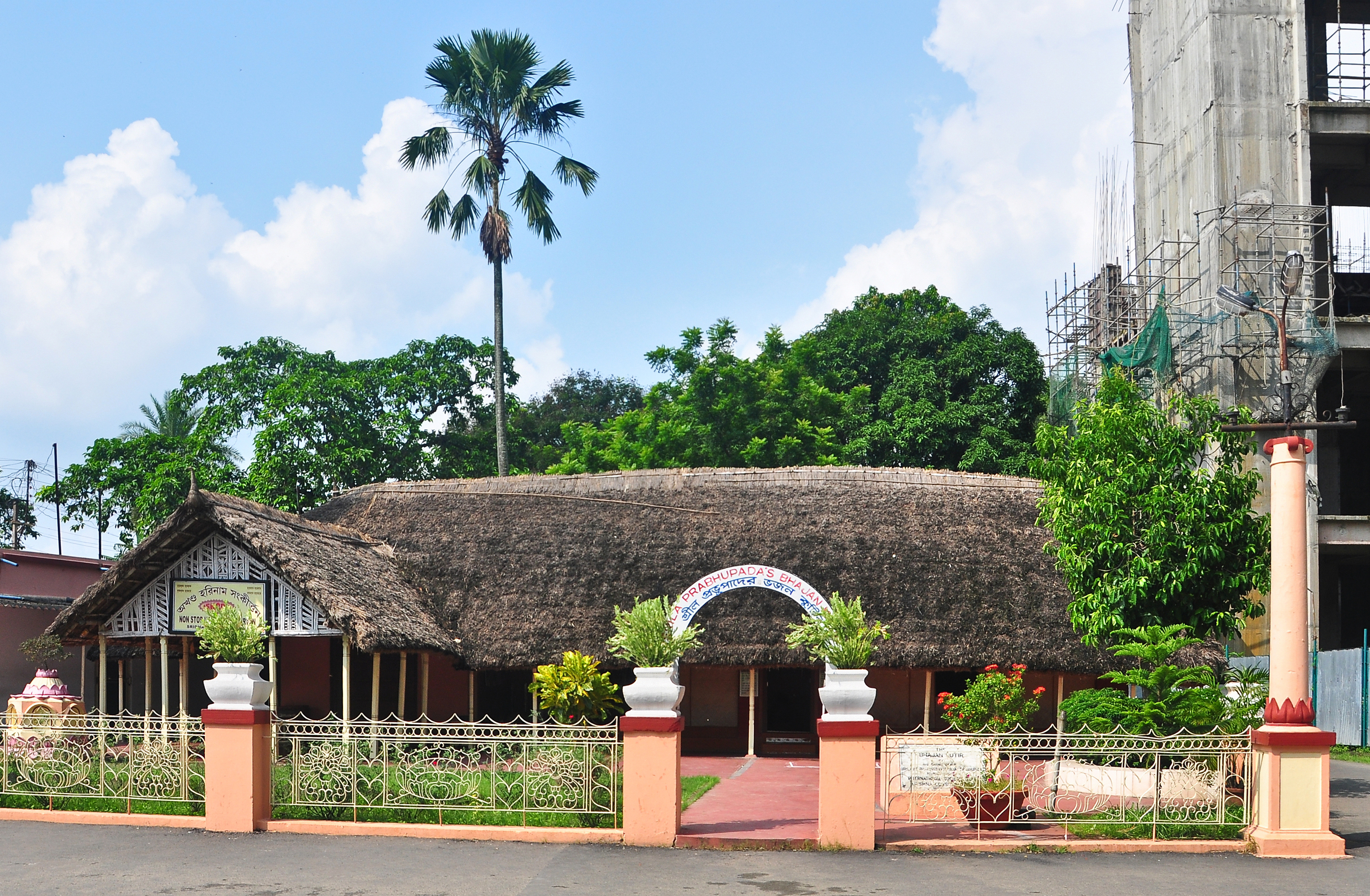
Bhajan Kutir

The main altar of Sri Sri Radha Madhav Mandir has a life size Radha Madhav, surrounded by Ashta-sakhis (eight principal gopi friends). Madhava (Krishna) stands in flute-playing posture, and Radha stands on his left. There is a second altar for Pancha Tattva (Sri Chaitanya and his four associates). In the center of this temple is the merciful deity of Narasimhadeva. The deity was installed here after the temple was attacked by dacoits in 1986. A large brass idol of Srila Prabhupada is worshiped at the Pushpa Samadhi Mandir. The Samadhi Mandir has extensive gardens. A large diorama exhibit inside the mausoleum depicts the life of Srila Prabhupada and his struggle to establish ISKCON. The outer walls of the temple are decorated with terra-cotta art depicting various descriptions of Srimad-Bhagavatam. Bhajan Kutir is a renovated thatched hut where Srila Prabhupada stayed from 1972 to 1973 when the first main building (Lotus Building) was built. The Kutir has an deity of Nitai Gaurasundar made of neem wood. The Temple of Vedic Planetarium houses the deity of Radhakrishna, a combined form of the Hindu god Krishna with his chief consort and shakti Radha.
