= Ford family (Michigan) =

American family

- Business family
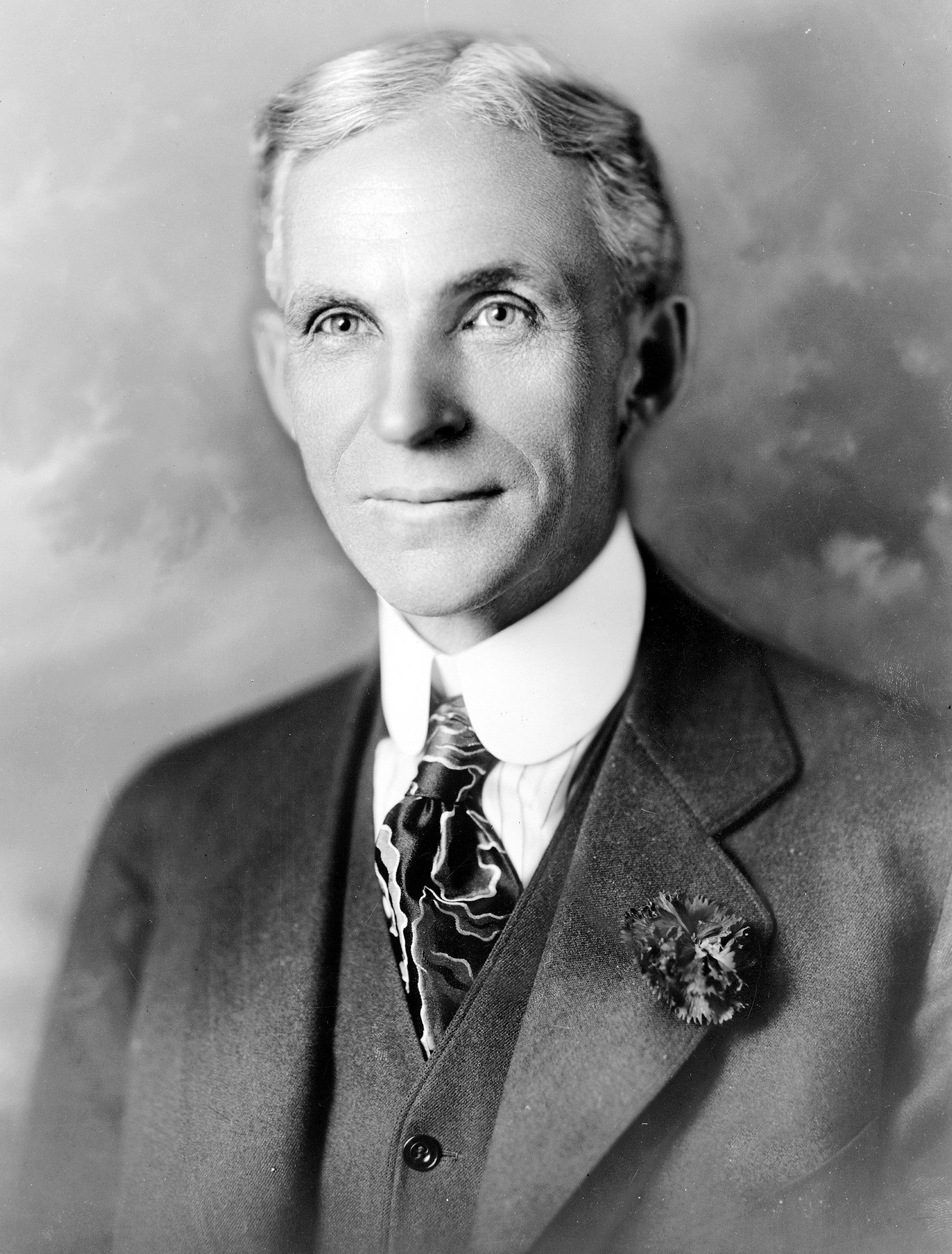
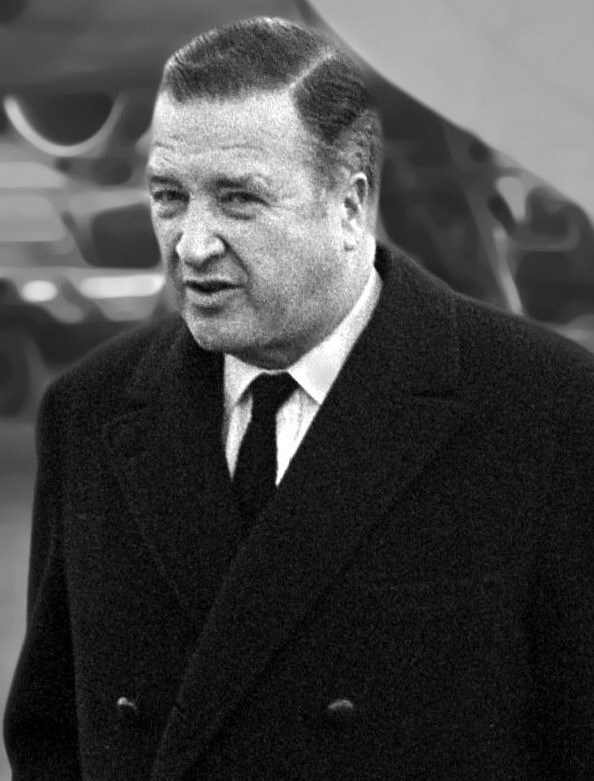
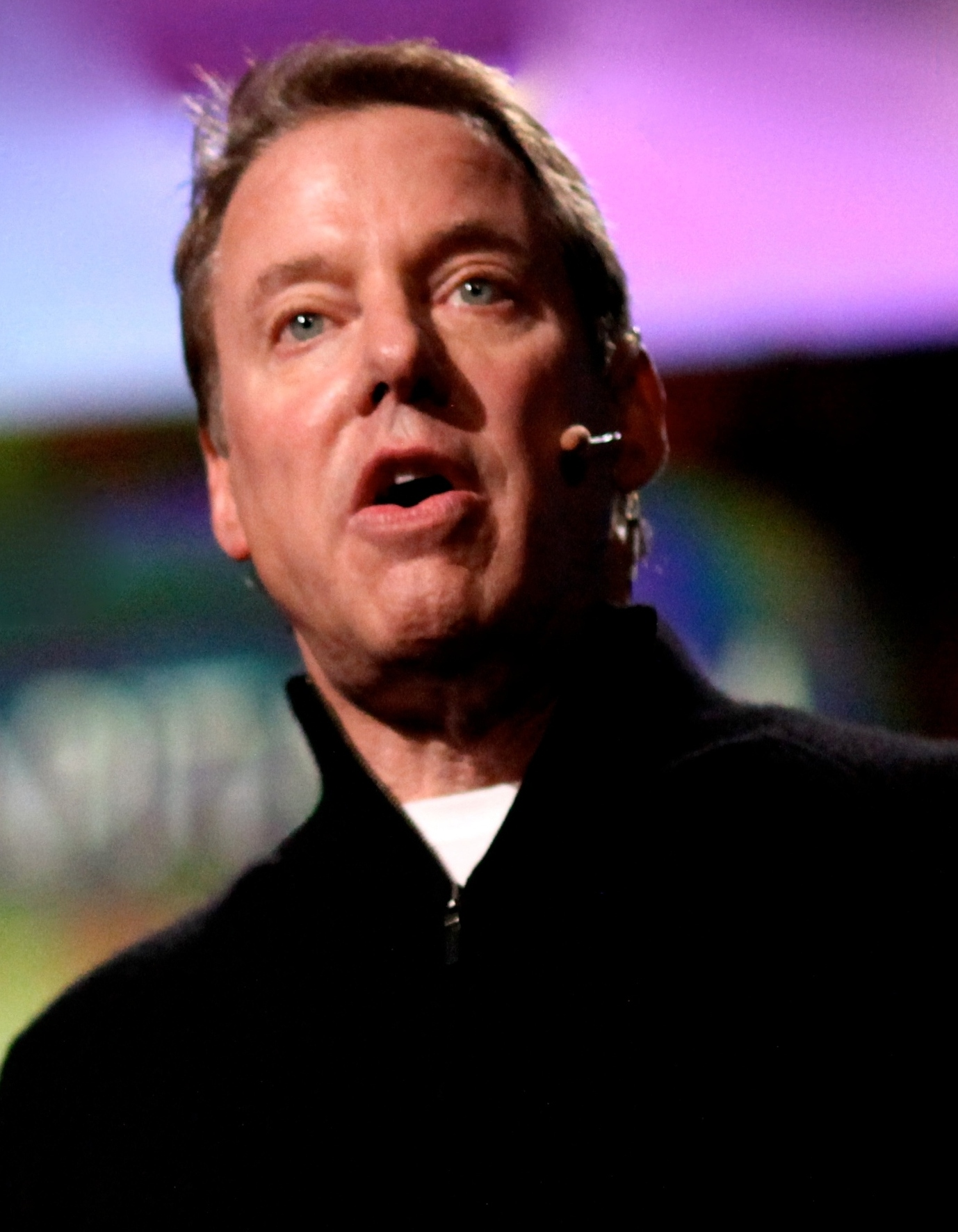
- Henry Ford Henry Ford II William Clay Ford Jr.
- Current region: Detroit, Michigan, U.S.
- Founded: 1847; 179 years ago
- Founder: William Ford
- Current head: William Clay Ford Jr.
- Members: Henry Ford; Edsel Ford; Henry Ford II; Benson Ford; Josephine Clay Ford; William Clay Ford Sr.; Edsel Ford II; Alfred Ford; Sheila Ford Hamp; William Clay Ford Jr.; Elena Ford and others
- Connected members: Clara Bryant Ford; Eleanor Clay Ford; Martha Firestone Ford; Stavros Niarchos and others
- Connected families: Firestone; Niarchos
- Estates: Fair Lane; Edsel and Eleanor Ford House

The Ford family is an American family from the U.S. state of Michigan. They are best known for their control of the Ford Motor Company automobile manufacturer which was originally founded by Henry Ford in the early twentieth century. Henry's grandson William Clay Ford Sr. and his family have controlled the Detroit Lions franchise of the National Football League since 1964. The Ford family are also members of the Episcopal Church.

Although the Ford family's ownership stake in the automaker had declined to less than 50% of the company's equity as of 2010, the family retained operational control through a special class of stock that was established early in the company's history and retained when the company made its initial public offering in 1956. The family owns all of the company's Class B shares, which are collectively entitled to elect 40% of the company's board of directors, with the remaining 60% elected by the holders of the company's publicly traded common stock.

== Family tree ==
William Ford (1775–1818)	Rebecca Jennings (1776–1851)
Samuel Ford (1791–1842)	Jonathan Thomas Ford (1799–1864)	Thomasina Smith (1803–1847)	Robert Ford (1803–1877)	George Ford (1811–1863)	Henry Ford (c. 1813–?)	Stephen Ford (c. 1815–?)
Rebecca Ford [Flaherty] (1824–1895)	William Ford (1826–1905)	Mary Litogot (1839–1876)	Jane Ford [Smith] (1829–1851)	Mary Ford (c. 1832–1882)	Nancy Ford [Flaherty] (1834–1920)	Henry Ford (1834–1901)	Samuel Ford (1838–1884)
Henry Ford (1863–1947)	Clara Jane Bryant (1866–1950)	John Ford (1865–1927)	Margaret Ford [Ruddiman] (1867–1960)	Jane Ford (1869–1906)	William Ford (1871–1959)	Robert Ford (1873–1877)
Edsel Bryant Ford (1893–1943)	Eleanor Lowthian Clay (1896–1976)
Henry Ford II (1917–1987)	Anne McDonnell (1919–1996)	Benson Ford Sr. (1919–1978)	Edith McNaughton (1920–1980)	Walter Buhl Ford II (1920–1991)	Josephine Clay Ford (1923–2005)	William Clay Ford Sr. (1925–2014)	Martha Parke Firestone (b. 1925)
Stavros Spyros Niarchos (1909–1996)	Charlotte McDonnell Ford (1941–2025)	Anne Ford (b. 1943)	Edsel Bryant Ford II (b. 1948)	Walter Buhl Ford III (1943–2010)	Eleanor Clay Ford [Sullivan] (b. 1946)	Josephine Clay Ford [Ingle] (b. 1949)	Alfred Brush Ford (b. 1950)
Elena Anne Ford-Niarchos (b. 1966)	Benson Ford Jr. (b. 1949)	Lynn Ford [Alandt] (b. 1951)	Martha Parke Ford [Morse] (b. 1948)	Sheila Firestone Ford [Hamp] (b. 1951)	William Clay Ford Jr. (b. 1957)	Elizabeth Hudson Ford [Kontulis] (b. 1961)

== Businesses ==
The following is a list of businesses in which the Ford family have held a controlling or otherwise significant interest.

- Dearborn Independent
- Detroit Lions
- Fontinalis Partners
- Ford Lio Ho Motor
- Ford Motor Company
- Ford Motor Company of Canada
- Ford Otosan
- Ford Times
- Getrag Ford Transmissions
- Matford
- Pentastar Aviation
- Philco-Ford
- Samcor
