= Eleanor Clay Ford =

American philanthropist and art patron (1896-1976)

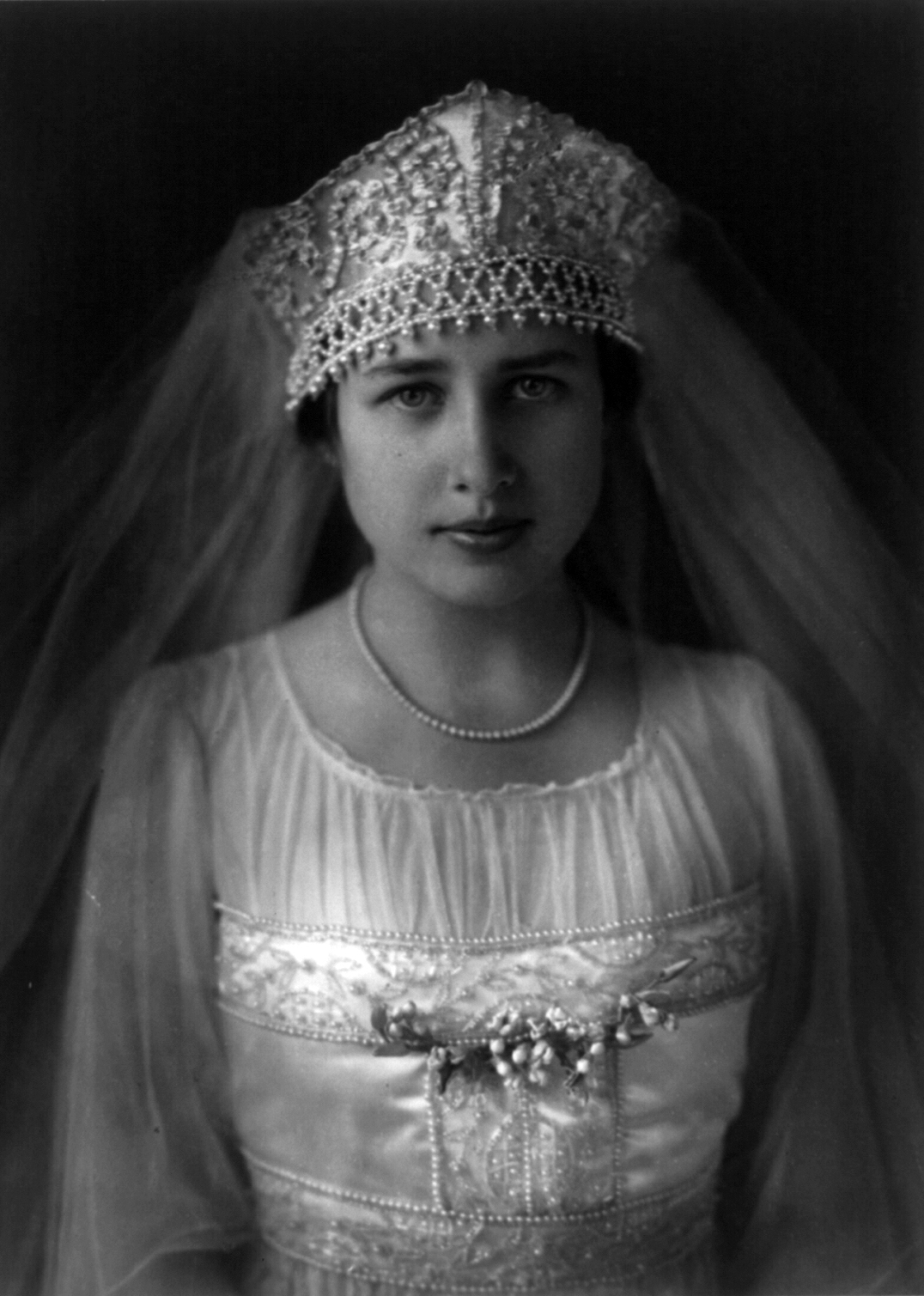
- Born: Eleanor Lowthian Clay; June 6, 1896; Detroit, Michigan, U.S.
- Died: October 19, 1976 (aged 80); Grosse Pointe Shores, Michigan, U.S.
- Burial place: Woodlawn Cemetery; 42.443958, -83.126944
- Spouse: Edsel Ford (m. 1916; died 1943)
- Children: Henry Ford II; Benson Ford; Josephine Clay Ford; William Clay Ford

Eleanor Clay Ford (born Eleanor Lowthian Clay; June 6, 1896 - October 19, 1976) was an American philanthropist, art patron, and the wife of Edsel Ford.

== Early life ==
Eleanor Clay Ford was born on June 6, 1896, to William Clay and Eliza Hudson in Detroit, Michigan. The youngest of three children, she was educated at the Detroit Home and Day School (University Liggett School). An active student, Eleanor was captain of the school basketball team, a member of the drama club, and manager of the school's yearbook, Rivista.

Her father, William Clay, passed away when Eleanor was twelve years old, at which time she, her mother, and sister would live with her uncle, businessman J.L. Hudson, of the Hudson's Department Store in Detroit. Socially-minded, prior to marriage, she taught at a local settlement school.

== Marriage & family life ==
Eleanor met Edsel Ford at Annie Ward Foster's Dancing School when she was fourteen. She was courted by Edsel Ford for nearly five years and was married in her uncle's home on Boston Boulevard in the East Boston Historic District in Detroit on November 1, 1916. The two were married by Reverend H. Lester of the Central Methodist Episcopal Church. The ceremony, a small, private affair, was attended by notable friends, colleagues, and business partners of Henry Ford, including Thomas Edison, Harvey Firestone, and John and Horace Dodge. After the ceremony, the couple departed for a two-month honeymoon, with stops in the American West, including the Grand Canyon and San Francisco, before their final destination of Hawaii.

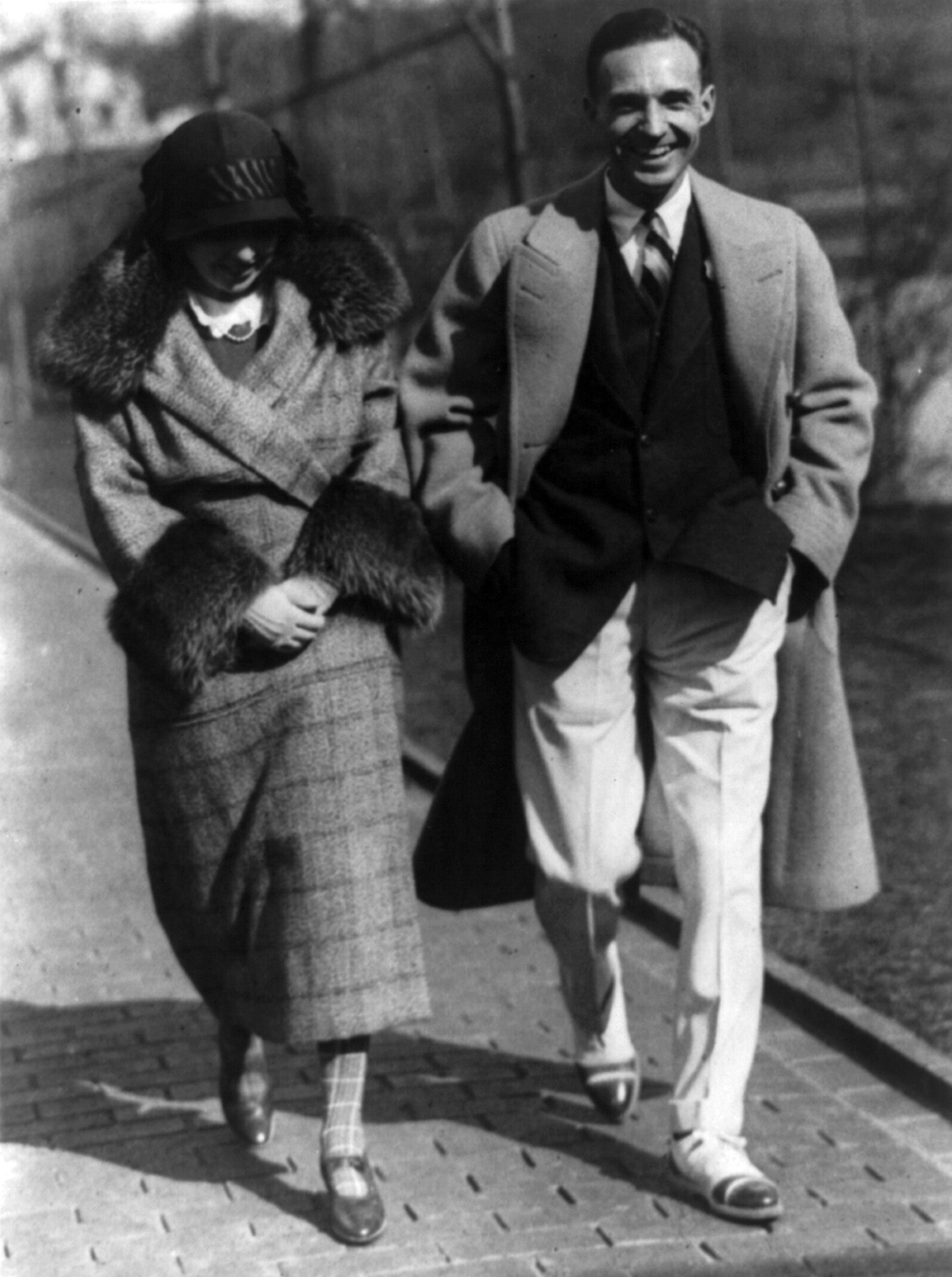
Edsel and Eleanor Ford

Upon return from their honeymoon, Eleanor and Edsel moved into their first home, known as the "Honeymoon Cottage," together in the Indian Village neighborhood of Detroit. They lived at this home until January 1921, when they moved to a home on Jefferson Avenue in Detroit. The pair had four children: Henry Ford II (1917-1987), Benson (1919-1978), Josephine Clay "Dody" (1923-2005), and William Clay (1925-2014). The family would live at the Jefferson Avenue home until their Gaulker Pointe estate was completed in 1929.

=== Gaukler Pointe ===
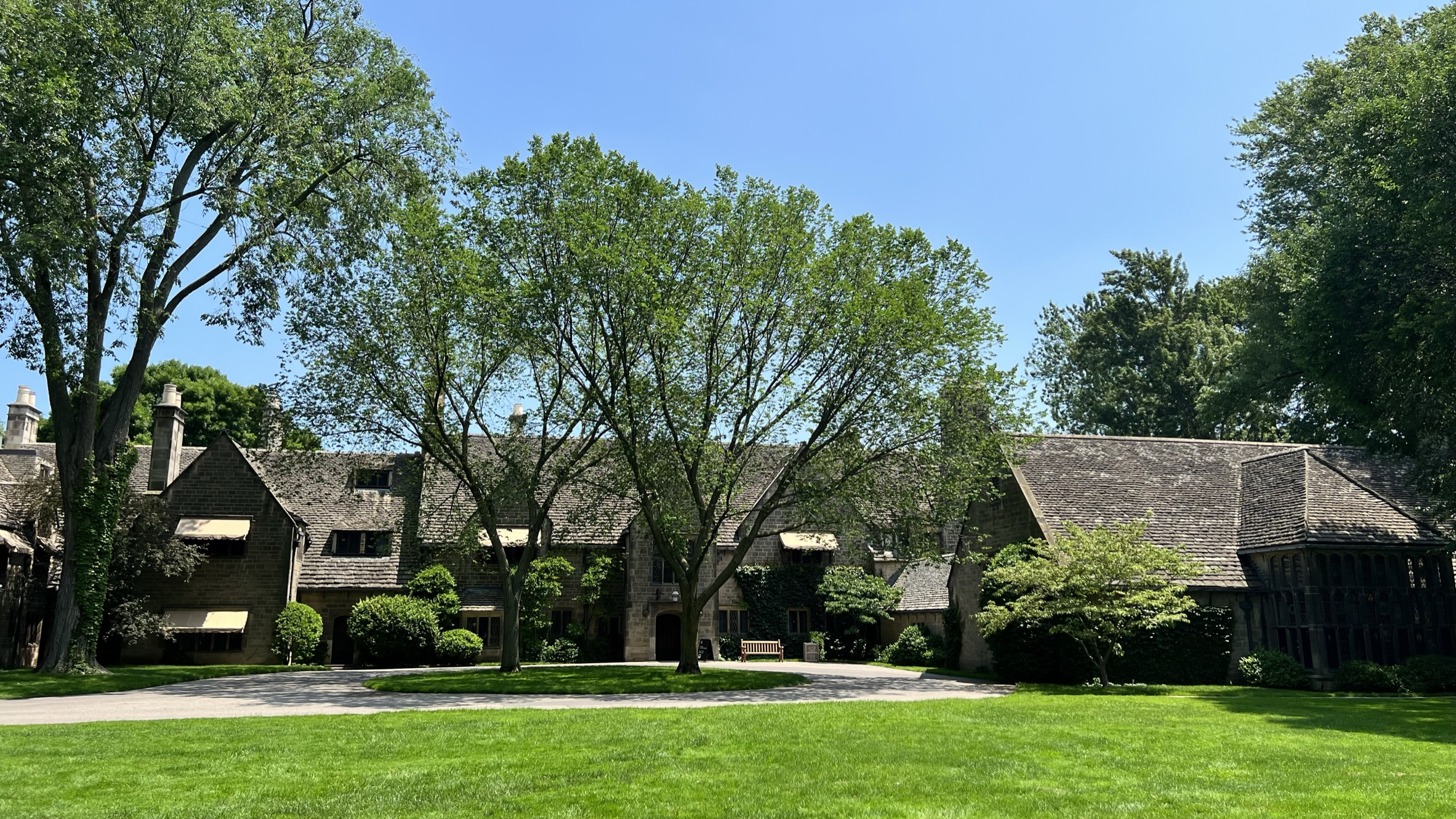
Edsel and Eleanor Ford House, Grosse Pointe Shores, MI - Front facade

Gaulker Pointe, now known as the Ford House, was the estate of Edsel and Eleanor Ford in Grosse Pointe Shores.

In 1911, Henry and Clara Ford purchased the Gaulker Pointe property with the intent to build their estate on the site, deciding later to build Fair Lane, closer to their roots in Dearborn. Retaining the property, Henry later sold the property in 1925 to Edsel and Eleanor Ford. On this land, on Lake St. Clair, the pair built a Cotswold-style home designed by Albert Kahn upon 125-acre landscapes designed by Jens Jensen. Construction began in 1926 and was completed in 1929, after post-construction fitment of several architectural elements originally from English manor homes collected by the Fords, including fireplaces, wood paneling, and a staircase. Buildings on the Estate included a power house, a gatehouse, a pool house, and a miniature child's playhouse.

The pair raised their four children in this home. Edsel Ford died in this home in 1943, and in 1946, Eleanor sold 43 acres to the city of Grosse Pointe Woods for the construction of a park. In her last will and testament, Eleanor stated, "Elsewhere in our country, and in England and other parts of Europe, ways have been found to preserve such residences for some form of public use, and they remain as witnesses to the past, as a part of the history of the area, and as an enrichment in the lives of future generations." Eleanor left a significant endowment at the time of her death to establish a museum at the property, stating, "Where once there were many extraordinary residences, mine is the last to remain, for the changes in the manner of living...and in our attitudes have resulted in the demolition of all the others. I wanted it to be used for the benefit of the public. In 1978, the property opened to the public for tours as a historic house museum and is listed on the National Register of Historic Places.

=== Other properties ===
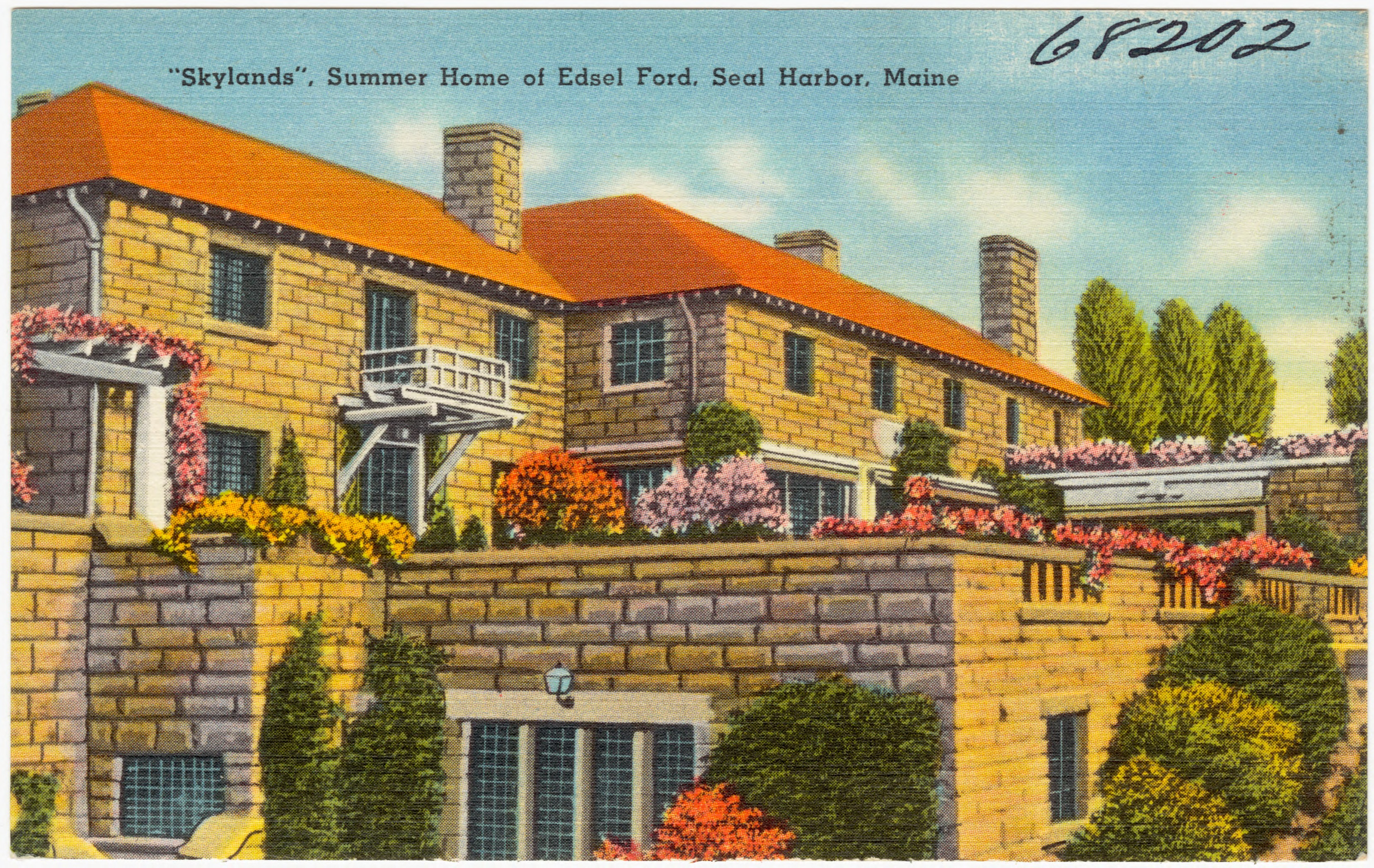
Postcard of Skylands, summer home of Edsel and Eleanor Ford in Seal Harbor, ME

Edsel and Eleanor owned several vacation properties in addition to their Gaulker Pointe property. These residences included a home on the Hobe Sound in Florida, a residence known as "Skylands" in Seal Harbor, Maine, and a year-round property near White Lake, Michigan, known as "Haven Hill." Eleanor was instrumental in the purchase of "Skylands," as she vacationed in that region as a child, and the property was built adjacent to John D. Rockefeller Jr., whose son, Nelson, was a close friend of the young Fords. The Haven Hill property was utilized as a "nerve retreat" for Edsel Ford and his family, and consisted of five primary structures, which included a gatehouse, stables, a barn, a carriage house, and the main residence referred to as "the Lodge." In 1946, Eleanor sold the estate to the Michigan State Park System, now the Michigan Department of Natural Resources, for what would become the Highland State Recreation Area.

== Public life ==
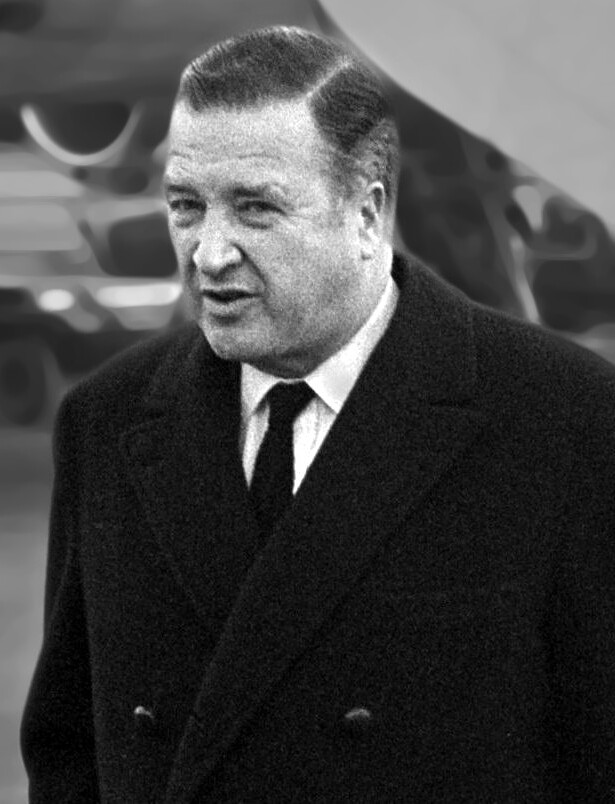
Edsel and Eleanor Ford's son, Henry Ford II

Eleanor Clay Ford was a leading figure in Detroit, a philanthropist, and often referred to as the "Grand Dame" of the Ford Family. She held considerable power within the Ford Motor Company, especially after her husband's death, as a major shareholder. She is credited, along with Clara Ford, for convincing Henry Ford to confirm Henry Ford II's appointment to President of Ford Motor Company in the wake of Edsel's death. She did so by threatening to sell the near 41% of the company shares she inherited from Edsel.

In addition to her influence in Ford Motor Company as a shareholder, she served on the Board of Directors as one of fifteen women directors in the company's history.

=== Philanthropy and patronage ===
Eleanor Ford provided personal and financial support for a multitude of Detroit organizations during her lifetime. These organizations included the Detroit branch of the National Association for the Advancement of Colored People (NAACP), Merrill-Palmer Institute, the Women's Committee of the United Community Services, Henry Ford Hospital, the United Foundation, the Detroit Community Fund, the Detroit Symphony, and the Ford Foundation.

After Edsel's death, Eleanor served on the Board of Trustees of Henry Ford Hospital as an active member for 53 years until her death, remaining a significant benefactor to the hospital throughout her life.

Similarly, Eleanor served as a trustee of the Museum of Modern Art (MoMA) in New York in 1948.

==== Detroit Institute of Arts (DIA) ====
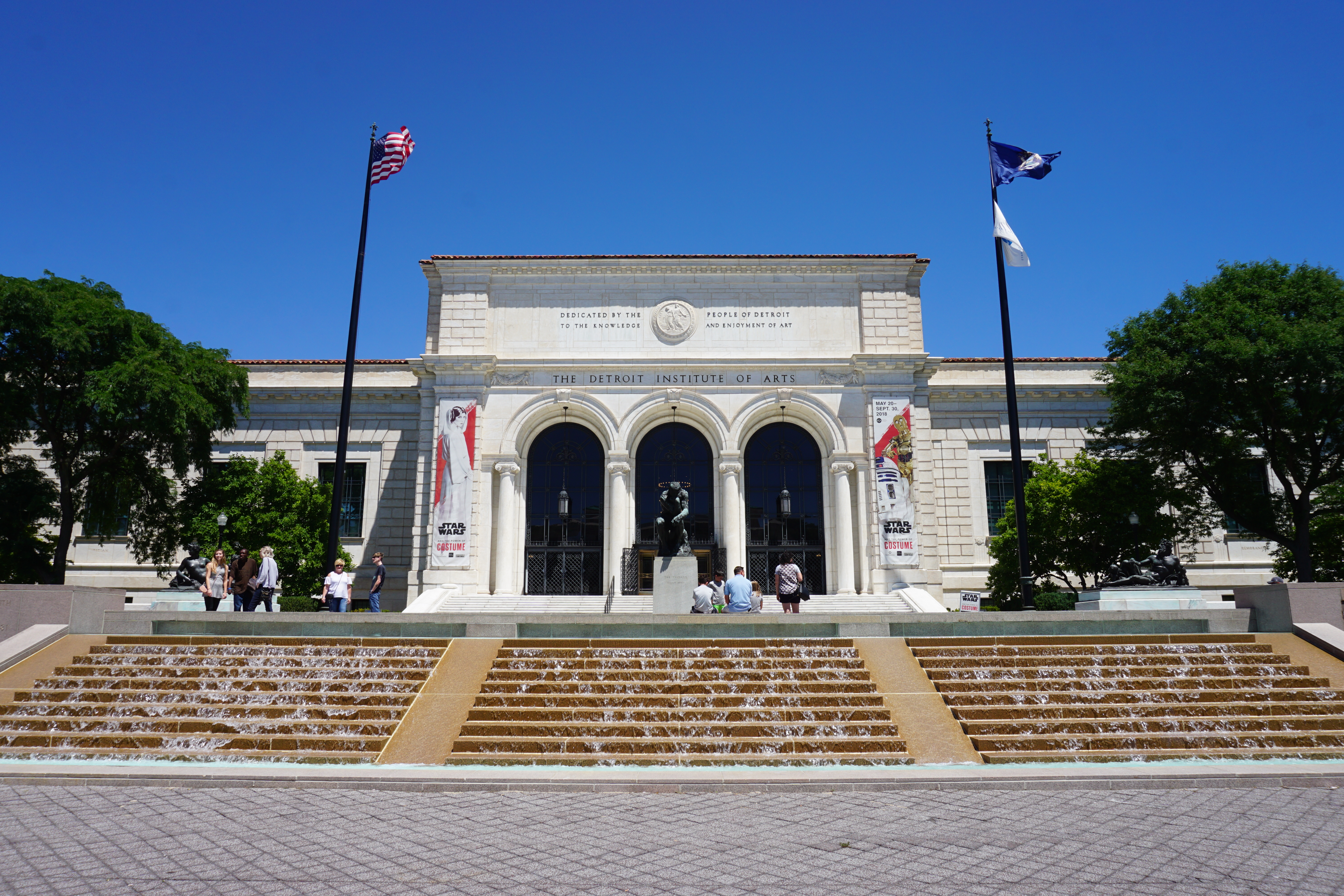
Detroit Institute of Arts, Detroit, MI - Woodward Avenue facade

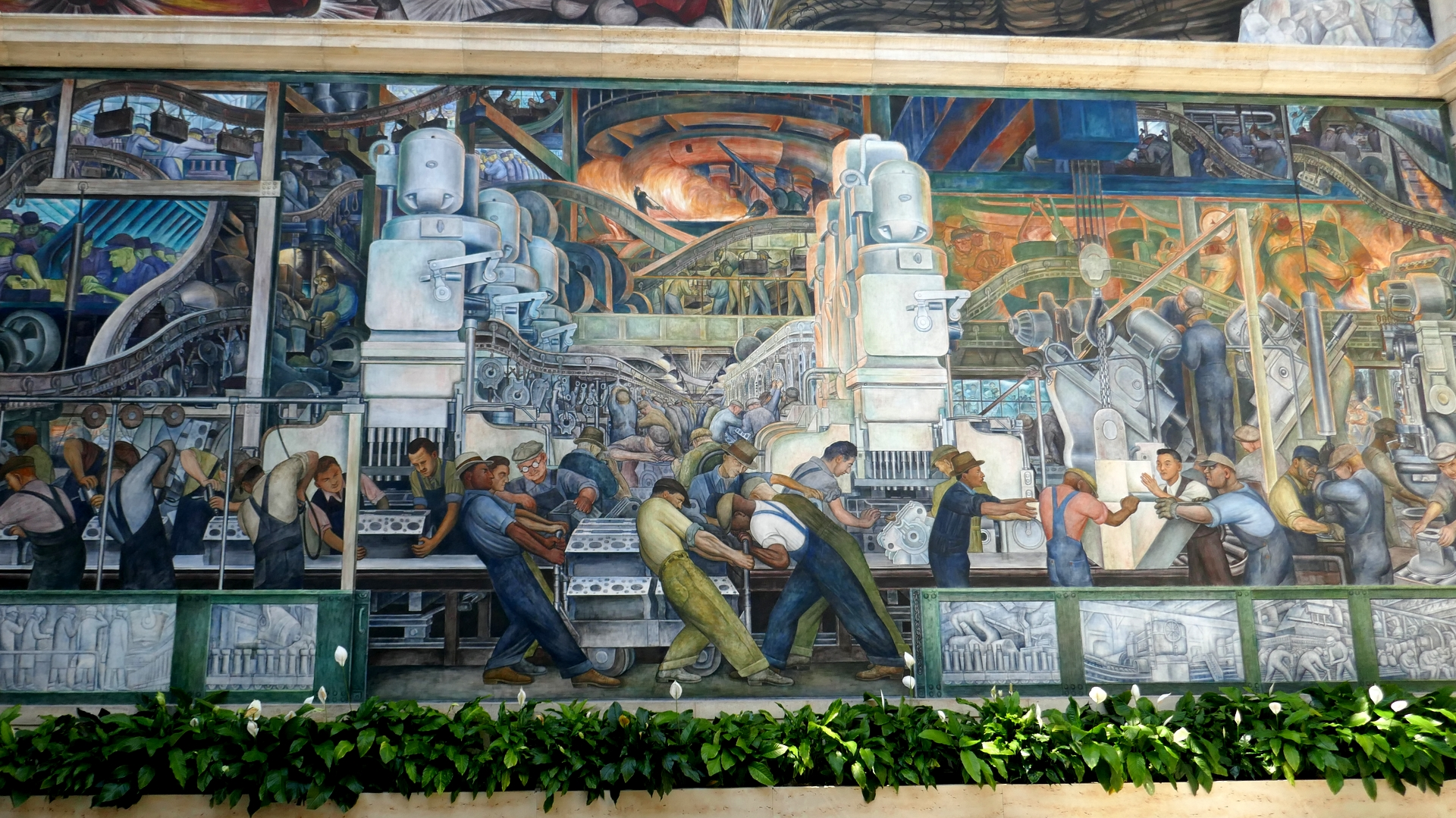
Detroit Institute of Arts, Detroit Industry murals (portion) by Diego Rivera in Rivera Court

An avid art collector and patron of the arts, Eleanor provided significant funding for the Detroit Institute of Arts (DIA) from 1924 to 1945. Edsel and Eleanor received an arts and art history education from the organization's first director (from 1925 to 1943), William R. Valentiner, which informed their extensive fine arts collection. Similarly, she was heavily influenced by her cousin Robert Hudson Tannahill, another significant donor to the organization, in the purchases made for their collection. Much of this collection would later be donated to the DIA, particularly after their respective deaths in 1943 and 1976. One of the most significant collection pieces to which the Fords were benefactors is the Detroit Industry fresco murals created by Diego Rivera in the institution's Rivera Court.

Her donations and support were major contributions to the south wing, and a $1 million donation from Ford would lead to the creation of the Department of African, Oceanic, and New World Cultures in the institution. Additionally, many of her contributions enabled the endowment of exhibitions and educational opportunities.

== Later life and death ==
Eleanor Clay Ford died on October 19, 1976 at Henry Ford Hospital in Detroit.
