= Benson Ford (1924 ship) =

Lake freighter built 1924, scrapped 1986

MV Benson Ford
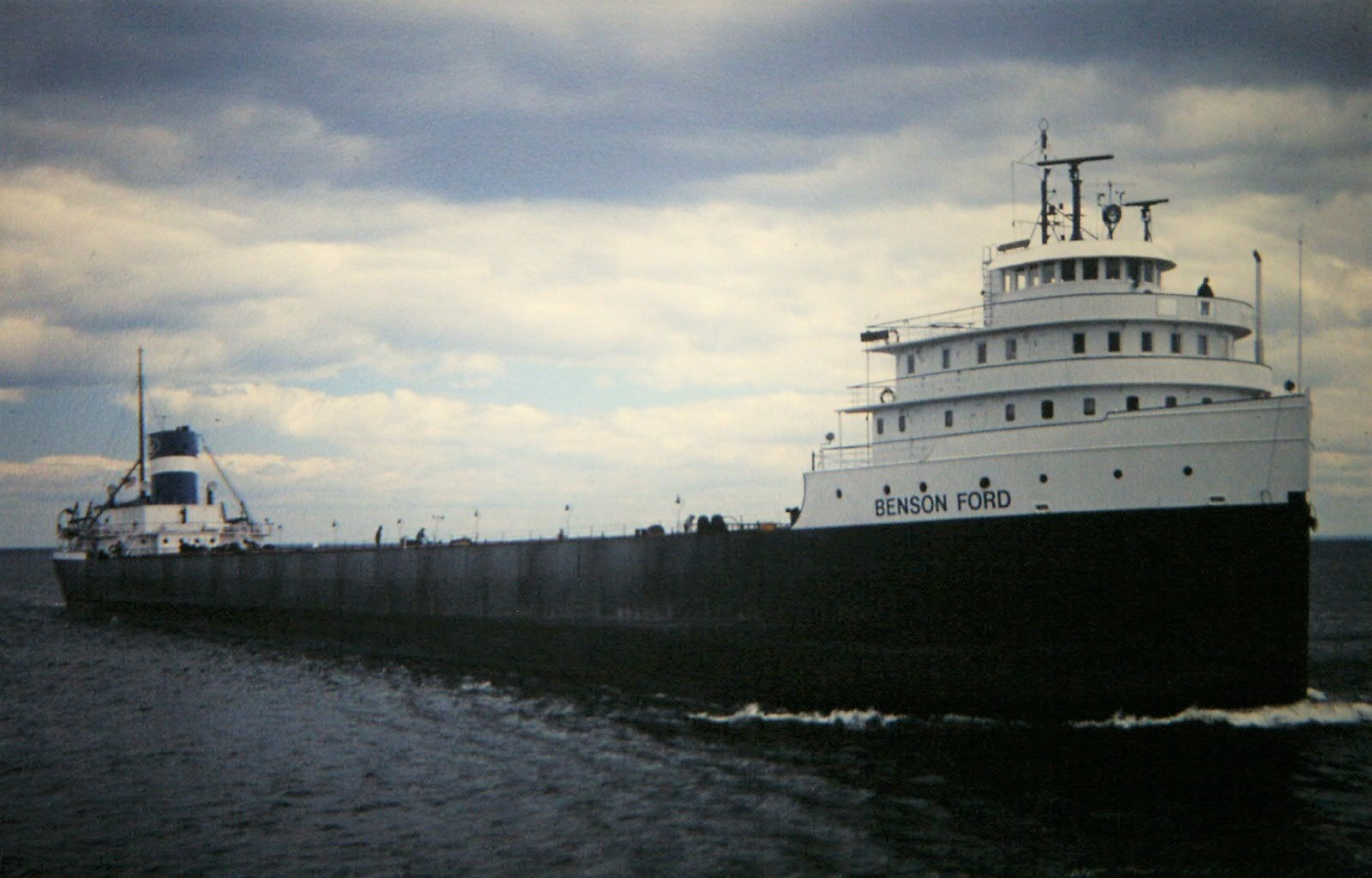
- MV Benson Ford in the Duluth Ship Canal in July 1978

History

United States
- Owner: Ford Motor Company/Rouge Steel Company (1924–1981) Frank J. Sullivan, Jr (1982-1999) Bryan Kasper (1999-Present)
- Operator: Ford Motor Company/Rouge Steel Company
- Port of registry: Detroit, Michigan
- Builder: Great Lakes Engineering Works
- Laid down: as MV Benson Ford
- Christened: 1924 April 26
- Completed: 1924
- Maiden voyage: 1924 August 2
- Out of service: December 1981
- Renamed: MV John Dykstra II, later MV Frank J. Sullivan
- Identification: USCG ID: 223909*IMO number: 5041554
- Fate: Scrapped 1986 by Marine Salvage Ltd. in Port Colborne, Ontario
- Notes: The forward cabin and pilothouse of MV Benson Ford was converted into a private island residence in 1986 which is now located on a cliff on South Bass Island near the village of Put-in-Bay in Lake Erie.

General characteristics
- Length: 612 ft (187 m)
- Beam: 62 ft (19 m)
- Depth: 32 ft (9.8 m)
- Propulsion: 1x Sun-Doxford 4 cylinder opposed piston diesel engine
- Speed: 12.7 miles per hour (11.0 kn)
- Capacity: 15,000 tons

MV Benson Ford was a lake freighter built for hauling raw material to Ford Motor Company's River Rouge manufacturing plant in Dearborn, Michigan. The ship was named for Benson Ford Sr., grandson of the late Henry Ford.

== History ==
=== Design and construction ===
MV Benson Ford was constructed in 1924 at Great Lakes Engineering Works in Ecorse, Michigan, for the Ford Motor Company/Rouge Steel Company, as one of two “state-of-the-art” bulk carriers that were ordered by Henry Ford to transport raw materials such as coal and iron ore, the sister ship was MV Henry Ford II, which was built by the American Ship Building Company in Lorain, Ohio. Rather than being powered by coal fired steam propulsion engines like most ships of the day were, the two Ford ships were had 3350 horsepower Sun Doxford diesel propulsion engines and electrically powered systems. They also had luxurious passenger accommodations for Henry Ford and his guests.

In order to be an efficient carrier in the ore and coal trades, MV Benson Ford was constructed with large cargo holds.

== Retirement, scrap, and current day ==
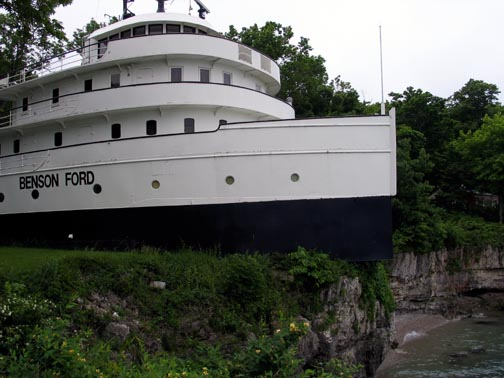
The MV Benson Ford as it sits today on a cliff on South Bass Island, Ohio

The first MV Benson Ford was decommissioned, so the Benson Ford name could be used for another ship in the Ford fleet SS Benson Ford III (now the MV Kaye E. Barker for the Interlake Steamship Company) and out of service in December 1981, it was later renamed the Dykstra and then the Frank J. Sullivan. Frank J. Sullivan, Jr. purchased this vessel and renamed it to honor his father who served in the Great Lakes shipping industry his entire life. Sullivan, Jr. had intentions of renovating the ship and adding it to his lake fleet, but this soon proved to be uneconomical he decided to preserve it and turn it into an island retreat. It was most recently purchased by the Kasper family of Sandusky, Ohio, and is their private island retreat. The ship can be seen by on the Jet Express high-speed ferry route from Port Clinton, Ohio.
