= Nrisingha Temple, Nadia =

Temple in West Bengal

Nrisingha Temple
- নৃসিংহ মন্দির
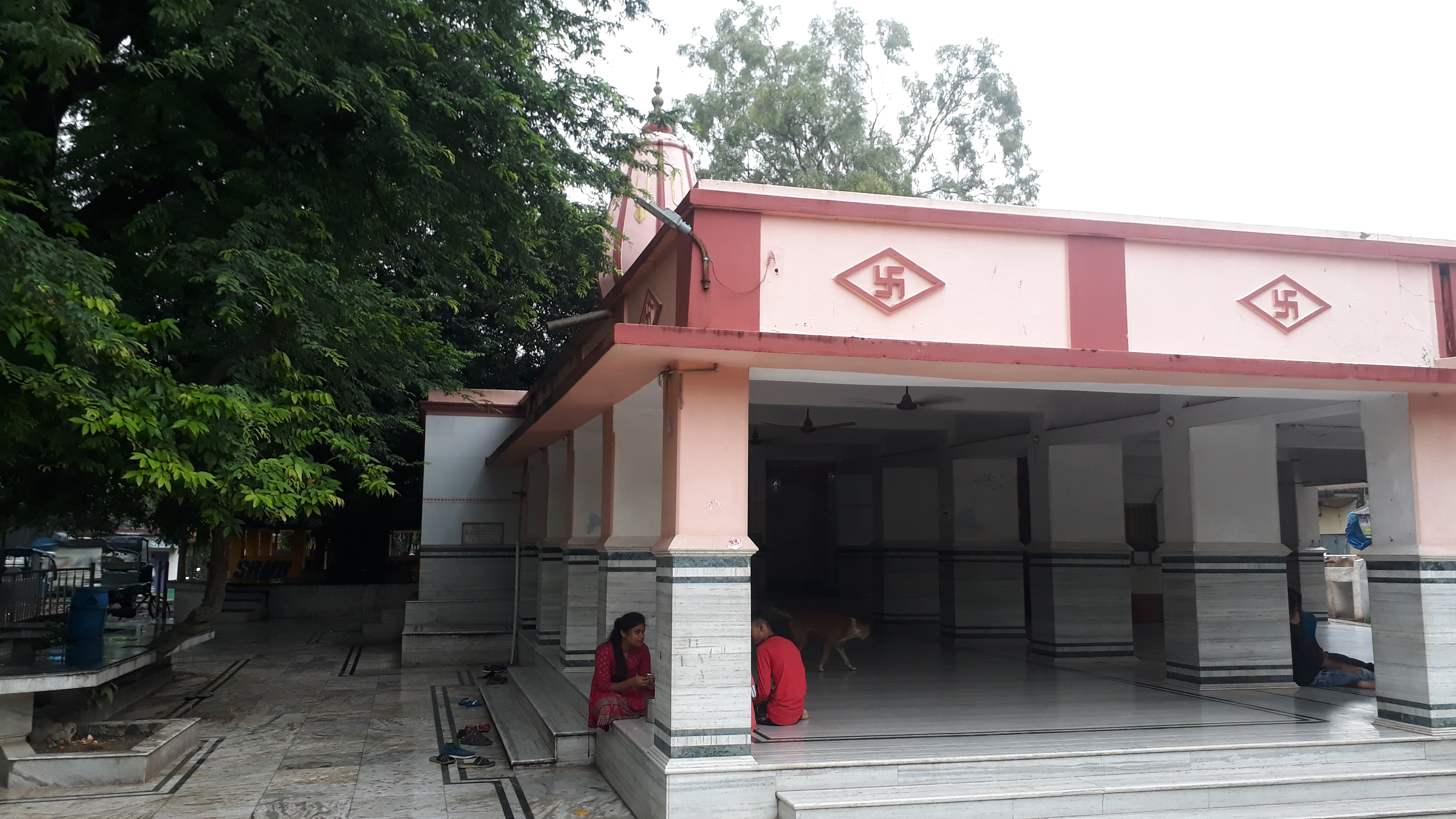
- Nrisingha Temple

Religion
- Affiliation: Hinduism
- District: Nadia district
- Deity: Narasimha

Location
- Location: Nrisinghapally, Nabadwip-Krishnagar road
- State: West Bengal
- Country: India
- Interactive map of Nrisingha Temple

Architecture
- Creator: Raja Khistish Chandra Roy (reconnoiter)
- Completed: 1896 (reconstructed)

Nrisingha Temple, Nadia, is an old Narasimha temple situated at Thakurtala, Nrisinghapally, beside Nabadwip-Krishnagar road in Nadia district, in the Indian state of West Bengal.

== History ==
There is a history that this temple existed right from the time of Satya Yuga. Lord Narasimha came here to wash the blood from his claws after killing Hiranyakasipu. A pond is situated beside the temple. According to history this pond was the part of the Mandakini River. Since then this place was known as Narasimha Kshetra or Nrisinghapally. Chaitanya Mahaprabhu and his associate Jeev Goswami often came to this temple.

Krishnachandra Roy, King of Krishnanagar helped to establish the Shrine of Narasimha. The temple was reconstructed in 1896 by Raja Khistish Chandra Roy of Krishnagar.
