= Josephine Clay Ford =

American philanthropist

- Born: Josephine Clay Ford; July 7, 1923; Dearborn, Michigan, U.S.
- Died: June 1, 2005 (aged 81); Detroit, Michigan, U.S.
- Spouse: Walter Buhl Ford II (m. 1943; died 1991)
- Children: 4, including Alfred
- Parents: Edsel Bryant Ford (father); Eleanor Lowthian Clay (mother)
- Family: Ford

Josephine Clay "Dody" Ford (July 7, 1923 – June 1, 2005) was an American philanthropist and the only granddaughter of Henry Ford.

== Early life ==
Josephine was born in Dearborn, Michigan, on July 7, 1923. She was the only daughter and the third child of Edsel Ford and his wife, Eleanor Lowthian Clay. Her brothers included Henry Ford II, who was chairman and CEO of Ford Motor Company, and William Clay Ford Sr.

Her father was the only child of Henry Ford, the founder of Ford Motor Company.

== Personal life ==
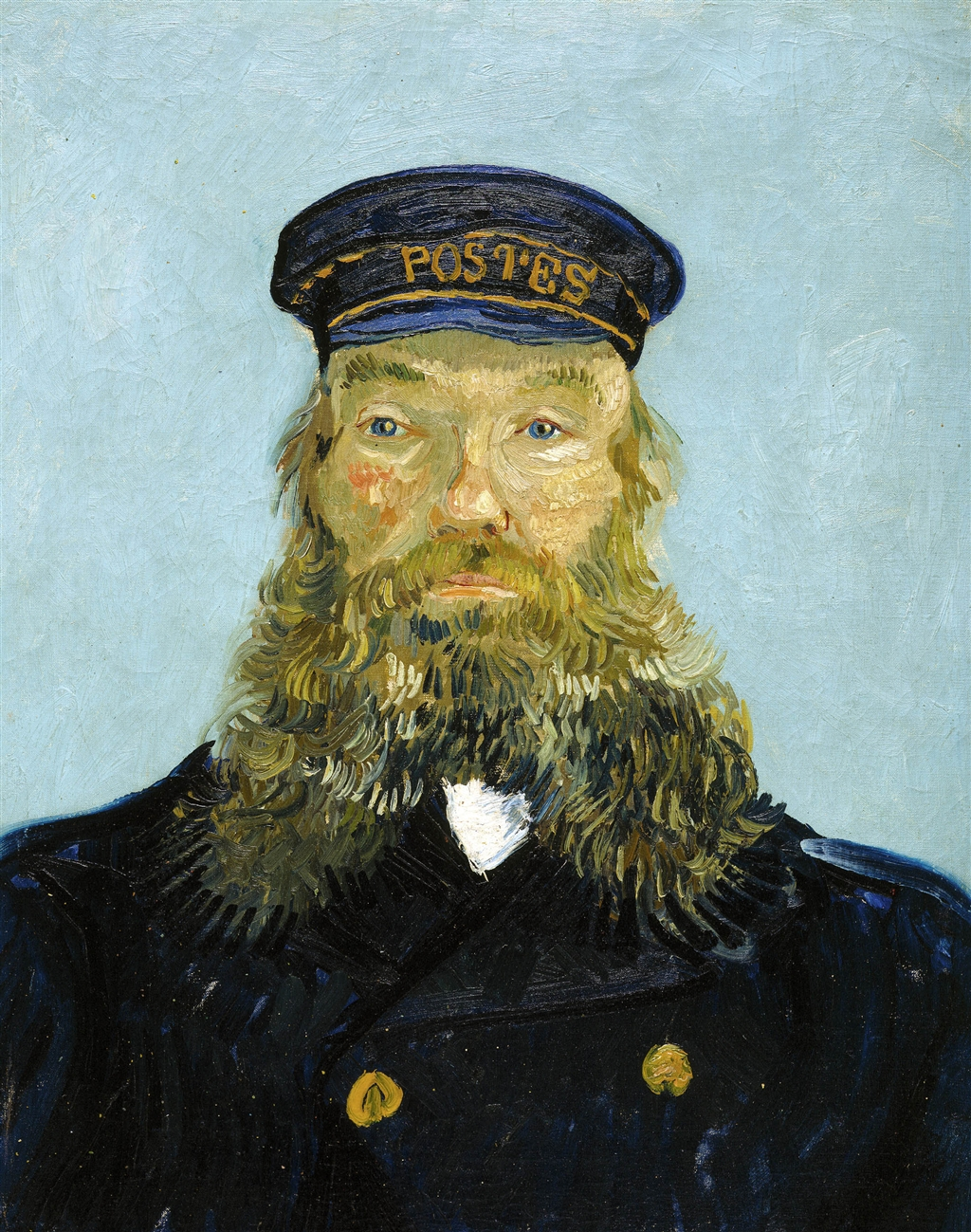
Van Gogh's Portrait of the Postman Joseph Roulin, donated by Ford to the Detroit Institute of Arts

In 1943, she married Walter Buhl Ford II (1920–1991, not a relative) whose family were prominent in the chemical business in the downriver suburbs of Detroit. He was a descendant of the other prominent families of Detroit including the banking Fords, the Buhl family and Brush family. Walter Ford was himself involved in interior and industrial design and was the chairman and chief executive of Ford & Earl Design Associates. They lived in Grosse Pointe Farms, Michigan, and together were the parents of two sons and two daughters:

- Walter Buhl Ford III (1943–2010)
- Eleanor Clay "Nonie" Ford Sullivan (b. 1946), who was married to Frederic Avery Bourke Jr. in 1967. Bourke is a part owner of Dooney & Bourke, the leather company. They divorced and she remarried, to John Sullivan Jr., and lives at 960 Fifth Avenue in New York City.
- Josephine Clay "Joey" Ford Ingle (b. 1949), who married John William Ingle Jr. in 1971.
- Alfred Brush Ford (b. 1950), who joined the Hare Krishna movement and renamed himself Ambarish Das.

Dody and her husband were also art collectors and owned paintings by Vincent van Gogh, Pierre-Auguste Renoir and Pablo Picasso. Walter died in 1991 of pancreatic cancer. Dody died on June 1, 2005, at the Henry Ford Hospital in Detroit.

=== Philanthropy ===
In 2001, Time magazine estimated her net worth at approximately $416 million. In 2005, at the time of her death, she owned more than 13 million shares in Ford.

Josephine and Walter Ford were major contributors to the College for Creative Studies (a $20 million donation in 1997) and the Detroit Institute of Arts among other institutions. Dody donated Van Gogh's Portrait of the Postman Joseph Roulin, which was valued at $40 million, to the Detroit Institute of Arts in 1996. She also donated large amounts of money for cancer research leading to the formation of the Josephine Ford Cancer Center.

== See also ==
- Ford family (Michigan)
