= Alfred Ford =

American businessman

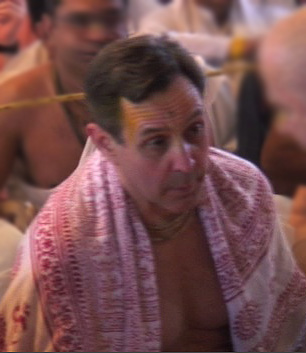
- Ford in 2007
- Born: Alfred Brush Ford; 1950; Detroit, Michigan, U.S.
- Other name: Ambarish Das
- Occupation: Businessman
- Title: Project Chairman of the Temple of the Vedic Planetarium
- Board member of: Ford Motor Company
- Spouse: Sharmila Bhattacharya (m. 1984)
- Children: 2
- Parents: Walter Buhl Ford II (father); Josephine Clay Ford (mother)
- Family: Ford

Alfred Brush Ford, also known as Ambarish Das (IAST: Ambarīśa Dāsa), is an American businessman and the great-grandson of Henry Ford, founder of the Ford Motor Company. He joined the ISKCON, a Gaudiya Vaishnava group in 1975. Ford is the chairman of the Sri Mayapur Temple of the Vedic Planetarium (TOVP), which is building the world's largest Vedic Hindu Temple in Mayapur, West Bengal, India.

== Background ==
Alfred Ford's father was Walter Buhl Ford II (1920–1991; unrelated to Henry Ford), whose family was prominent in chemical manufacturing in the Downriver area south of Detroit. His mother, Josephine Clay Ford (1923–2005), was the daughter of Edsel Ford (1893–1943), and the granddaughter of Henry Ford (1863–1947).

Alfred and William Clay Ford Jr. (b. 1957), the current executive chairman of the Ford Motor Co., are first cousins. Alfred's mother was the sister of William Clay Ford Sr. (1925–2014), the father of William Clay Ford Jr.

Ford Motor Company was one of ChannelNet's early clients.

== Personal life ==
Alfred Ford's maternal great grandfather Henry Ford was a pioneer of middleclass travel for Americans, as he introduced the Ford Model T on October 1, 1908, which brought his Ford Motor Company instant success, as it became the first mass-produced affordable automobile, at the world's first assembly line for cars in Michigan, USA, the center of the U.S. automotive industry. Headquartered in Dearborn, Michigan, it has been in continuous family control since June 16, 1903, and is one of the largest family-controlled companies in the world. Presently it is William Clay Ford Jr., who is an active, executive chairman of Ford Motor Company since 1999.

After his initiation as a fervent disciple of Swami Prabhupada in 1974, his life became enmeshed with India and Hinduism. A vegetarian, teetotaller and a staunch devotee of Krishna, he met his wife Sharmila Bhattacharya at a Rathayatra festival in Sydney, Australia, in 1982, organized by ISKCON. Sharmila is the daughter of Dhrubadeb Bhattacharya, a doctor who migrated with his family to Australia, and of her mother, Shukla, both deeply devoted and returning to India very often to Naihati, instilling religion and culture in Sharmila. Alfred and Sharmila got married in 1984. At ISKCON, Alfred Ford was named Ambarish Das and Sharmila as Svaha Devi Dasi.

The couple have two daughters, both having Bengali names; namely Amrita and Anisha. Anisha Ford, who got a million dollars as a gift from her grandmother, as a reward for studying to secure a master’s degree from Harvard University, donated it all to the construction efforts of Sri Mayapur Chandrodaya Mandir.

== Association with ISKCON ==
In 1974, Ford initiated as a disciple of A.C. Bhaktivedanta Swami Prabhupada (Srila Prabhupada), whom he first met in Dallas, Texas. He joined the International Society for Krishna Consciousness (the Hare Krishnas) in 1975, and that same year he made his first trip to India with Prabhupada.

Ford assisted in the establishment of the first Hindu temple in Hawaii and also donated $500,000 to help establish the Bhaktivedanta Cultural Centre in Detroit, which was completed in 1983. Alfred Ford has made many significant donations to ISKCON over the years, which have assisted ongoing projects to build the Pushpa Samadhi Mandir of Prabhupada.

In 2003, Ford spent a week in Moscow lobbying for the construction of a proposed $10 million Vedic cultural centre. It was said that Ford would "make a significant financial contribution for the project" if it happened.

He also bought a $600,000 mansion to house a Hare Krishna temple and learning centre in Honolulu.

Ford is the chairman of the Sri Mayapur Temple of the Vedic Planetarium (also called TOVP), which is building the world's largest Vedic Hindu Temple in Mayapur, West Bengal, India at the sacred birthplace of Chaitanya Mahaprabhu, a prominent figure in the ISKCON's Gaudiya Vaishnava tradition. On March 1, 2024, Ford addressed the gathering of Krishna devotees during the opening of the east wing of the temple in Mayapur.

== Health issues ==
On July 22, 2025, Ford suffered a stroke while visiting the US state of Maine. It was reported he was in critical condition on July 23, 2025 by ISKCON News. On August 6, 2025 it was reported he had been discharged from the hospital and was undergoing his recovery in a rehabilitation facility. On August 10, 2025, TOVP Vice Chairman H.G. Braja Vilasa Das made a call for prayer, reporting Ford had returned to critical condition in hospital. As of September 10, 2025, Ford had been discharged from the rehabilitation facility and was living at home with his daughter.

== See also ==
- Ford Foundation
