= Brooks Firestone =

American businessman and politician from California

Member of the California State Assembly from the 35th district
- In office December 5, 1994 - November 30, 1998
- Preceded by: Jack O'Connell
- Succeeded by: Hannah-Beth Jackson

Personal details
- Born: June 18, 1936 (age 90)
- Party: Republican
- Spouse: Catherine "Kate" Boulton (m. 1958)
- Relations: William Eleroy Curtis (great-grandfather); Harvey S. Firestone (grandfather); Harvey S. Firestone Jr. (uncle)
- Children: 4, including Andrew Firestone
- Parents: Leonard Firestone (father); Polly Curtis (mother)
- Education: Columbia College (A.B.)
- Occupation: Businessman, politician, author

Military service
- Branch/service: United States Army

Anthony Brooks Firestone (born June 18, 1936) is an American businessman and politician.

The son of Leonard Firestone, a grandson of Harvey Samuel Firestone and Idabelle Smith, and a nephew of Harvey Firestone Jr., he was educated at The Webb School, and graduated from Columbia University with an A.B. in economics in 1961. He worked for Firestone until 1972, when he quit the company, and moved his family to the Santa Ynez Valley in California.

He represented the 35th District in the California State Assembly for two terms (1994–1998). In 1998, he ran for the United States House of Representatives to succeed the late Walter Capps, but lost the Republican nomination to Tom Bordonaro, who went on to lose the general election to Lois Capps, the widow of the prior incumbent. Firestone operated the San Antonio Ranch, Firestone Vineyard, Prosperity Wines, and other businesses.

His son, Adam, and his son-in-law, David Walker, both together co-run Firestone Walker Brewing Company; his other son, Andrew, appeared on ABC's show The Bachelor.

In the 2004 election for the District 3 seat on the Santa Barbara County Board of Supervisors, Firestone defeated John Buttny, Slick Gardner and Steve Pappas. As a supervisor, Firestone was criticized for his plan to get rid of the county's Oak Tree Protection ordinance, a historic 1998 compromise between agriculture and environmental interests. He served only one term on the Board, suffering health problems in 2008, the last year of his term.

In his personal life, Firestone has written and published three books, including the Valley Animals Series: Valley Animals (2010) and More Valley Animals (2020), and the semi-autobiographical Evensong. In 2020 these titles were published and re-distributed by Polyverse Publications.
