= Andrew Firestone =

American TV reality show personality (born 1975)

- Born: Andrew Boulton Firestone; July 10, 1975 (age 51); Santa Barbara, California, U.S.
- Occupations: Businessman, television personality
- Spouse: Ivana Bozilovic (m. 2008; div. 2025)
- Children: 3
- Parents: Brooks Firestone (father); Catherine Boulton (mother)
- Relatives: Leonard Firestone (grandfather); Harvey S. Firestone (great-grandfather); Idabelle Smith Firestone (great-grandmother); William Eleroy Curtis (great-great-grandfather)

Andrew Boulton Firestone (born July 10, 1975) is an American television personality and businessman.

== Early life ==
Educated at Stevenson School and Westminster School, he graduated from the University of San Diego in business administration where he also was a member of the football team, in 1998.

== Career ==
=== Professional career ===
Andrew Firestone is principal and founder of StonePark Capital, a Santa Barbara-based hospitality firm that focuses on the acquisition and development of select-service hotels. As of 2023, the firm manages seven hotels, totaling more than 569 guest rooms. Five of those properties are on the Central Coast: La Quinta Inn and Suites in San Luis Obispo and Santa Barbara, as well as Mason Beach Inn, Courtyard by Marriott and The Waterman Hotel in Santa Barbara.

=== The Bachelor ===
Firestone was the third bachelor on the ABC reality series The Bachelor. On the show, premiered in March 2003, Firestone courted 25 bachelorettes, progressively eliminating them, and eventually selected one of the group for a continuing relationship. Andrew selected and proposed to Jen Schefft, who accepted and moved to California to be with him. The couple decided to go their separate ways in December 2003 but remained friends.

=== Other television appearances ===
In 2005, Firestone participated in the sixth Celebrity Poker Showdown tournament on Bravo. He won his first-round game but placed third in the tournament championship. Firestone played for the charity Direct Relief.

In 2006, Firestone appeared in an episode of VH1's Celebrity Paranormal Project.

Firestone is the host of a lifestyle series entitled Billionaires Car Club, distributed by American Television Distribution. It first aired in May 2008.

Firestone also made an appearance on episode two of Flavor of Love Girls: Charm School on VH1.

Firestone and his wife have appeared in television advertisements for the Baby Bullet.

== Personal life ==
On July 5, 2008, Firestone married actress/model Ivana Bozilovic at St. Mark's in the Valley Episcopal Church in Los Olivos, California. He announced their divorce on August 30, 2025. Firestone and Bozilovic have three children: sons Adam Brooks (b. March 21, 2009) and Shane (b. January 27, 2014), and daughter Anja Jasmine (b. April 15, 2011).

His brother, Adam, and his brother-in-law, David Walker, both together co-run Firestone Walker Brewing Company.

Andrew is also a long time supporter and former board member of MOXI, The Wolf Museum of Exploration + Innovation in Santa Barbara.

Preceded by Aaron Buerge	The Bachelor; Season 3	Succeeded by Bob Guiney
