= William Eleroy Curtis =

American journalist and writer

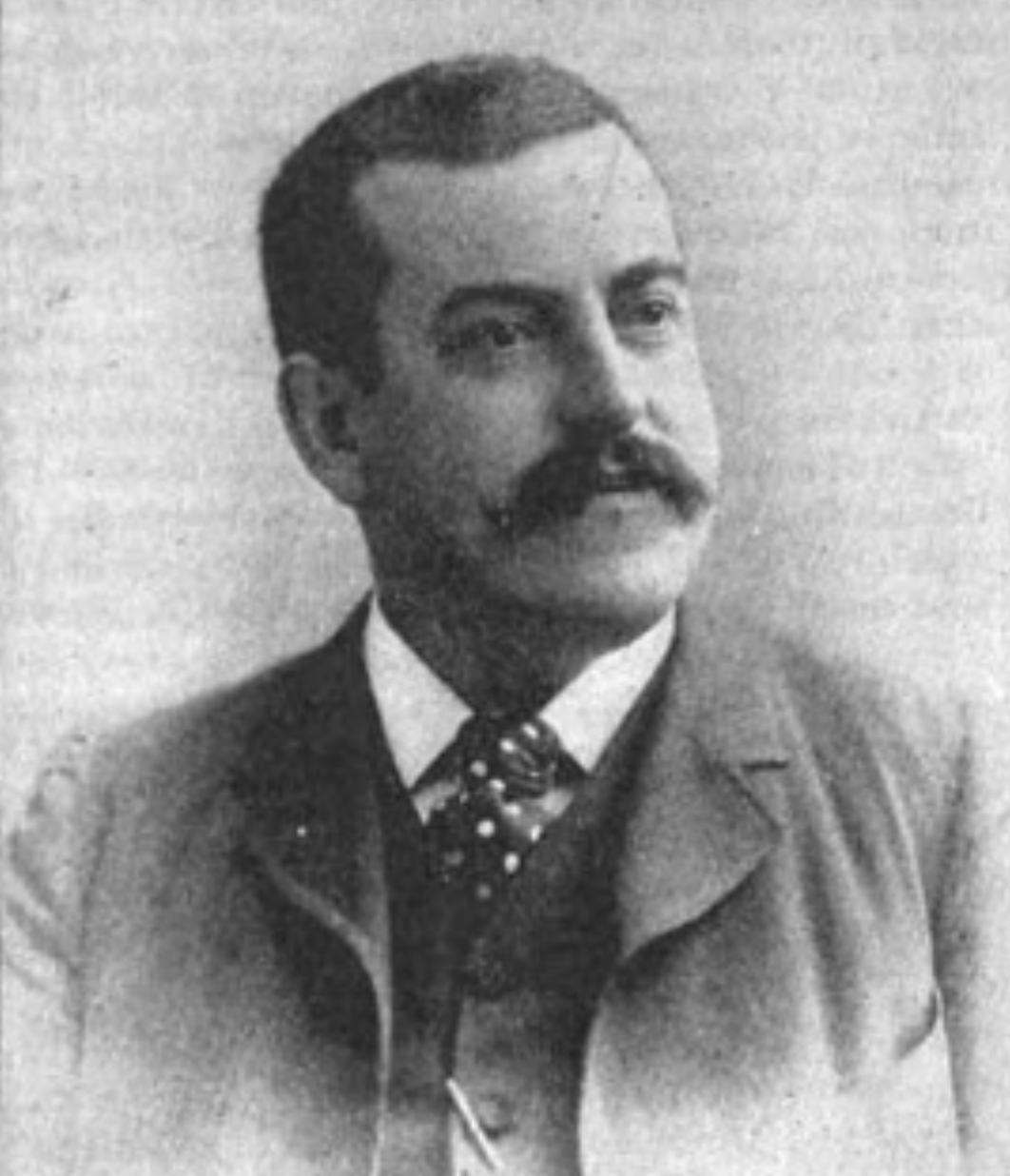
- Picture printed in Review of Reviews, June 1892
- Born: November 5, 1850; Akron, Ohio
- Died: October 5, 1911 (aged 60); Philadelphia, Pennsylvania
- Burial place: Rock Creek Cemetery, Washington, D.C.
- Education: Western Reserve College (BA, MA, Litt.D)
- Known for: Advocacy for Pan-Americanism, analysis of Latin America and international trade, newspaper coverage of Reconstruction and the Old West, Travel literature
- Political party: Republican
- Spouse: Cora Belle Kepler
- Children: 3
- Relatives: Brooks Firestone (great-grandson); Kitty Cone (great-granddaughter); Andrew Firestone (great-great-grandson)

William Eleroy Curtis (November 5, 1850 – October 5, 1911) was an American journalist, author, diplomat, political activist, and exhibitor. He was a prominent proponent of Pan-Americanism. Curtis' partisan reporting earned him patronage appointments and advanced his ideological goals. His career reflected the influence of bias, cronyism, and imperialism on journalism during the Gilded Age. Curtis held a series of leadership roles in the State Department, as well as the supranational organizations which anticipated the Organization of American States.

== Early life ==
Curtis was born on November 5, 1850, in Akron, Ohio, the second son of Eleroy Curtis, a Presbyterian minister, and Harriet Eliza Coe. Harriet was the daughter of Reverend Harvey Coe, the first elected trustee of Western Reserve College. After graduating from high school in Clinton, New York, Curtis attended Western Reserve College. While a freshman, he applied for a typesetter position at The Cleveland Leader, but was assigned reporting work instead. Curtis graduated with a Bachelor of Arts in 1871. Curtis worked for the Erie Dispatch in 1871, followed by the Toledo Commercial in 1872.

== Journalistic career ==
=== Chicago Inter-Ocean ===
In 1873, he joined the reporting staff of the Chicago Inter-Ocean. Embedded with George Armstrong Custer's 7th Cavalry during the 1874 Black Hills Expedition, Curtis was widely credited as the first to report the discovery of gold in the Dakota Territory; this revelation precipitated the Black Hills Gold Rush. His adamant praise of Custer contributed to the officer's popular image as a tragic hero who furthered the "manifest destiny" of the United States.

Shortly after returning from the Black Hills, Curtis was dispatched to report on the aftermath of the Coushatta massacre in Louisiana. He subsequently gave extensive coverage to the activities of the Ku Klux Klan and members of the White League. As a consequence, the Klan placed a $5,000 bounty on his head (equivalent to $142,000 in 2025). His reports were used by Republicans seeking to tether Democrats to Neo-Confederate hate groups ahead of the 1874 midterm elections. Curtis then wrote about the Brooks–Baxter War from Arkansas.

In 1874, Curtis tracked down for an interview, and was subsequently taken prisoner by, the James–Younger Gang, a prominent gang of highwaymen. While being held hostage, he was able to obtain their story, which was published in the Inter-Ocean. In the spring of 1875, he was named head of the Inter-Ocean bureau in Washington, D. C., and would remain at that post until August 1880. His first book, a novel titled Tibbalses Folks, was published in 1875.

Curtis returned to the Chicago office of Inter-Ocean in August 1880, where he became the editor-in-chief. Curtis was the Fourth President of the Chicago Press Club, performing that role in 1883.

In 1883, Curtis observed anthropologist Frank Hamilton Cushing's life among the Zuni people of New Mexico. When U.S. Army Captain Henry Ware Lawton and Major William F. Tucker claimed 800 acres overlapping a traditional Zuni farming village – omitted from the 1877 reservation borders – for cattle ranching, Cushing urged Curtis and Boston Herald reporter Sylvester Baxter to begin a press campaign on behalf of the Zuni land claim. This publicity culminated in a May 1883 executive order which expanded the reservation to include the contested village.

Curtis was a founding member of the Gridiron Club in 1885, a prestigious organization of Washington, D.C. journalists renowned for its annual dinner. He stayed with the Inter Ocean until 1886.

=== Chicago Record ===
In 1887, Curtis joined the Chicago Record, becoming manager at the Washington D. C. bureau. He served as a reporter-at-large and wrote a daily column. In 1888, the Chicago Record sent Curtis to cover the Russian nihilist movement.

After completing his work for the 1893 World's Fair, Curtis became an international contributor for the Record, filling the role until December 1906. Starting from 1903, Curtis' letters on foreign locales and contemporary issues received wider circulation in regional newspapers throughout the United States. Subordinates who attempted to modify Curtis' writings, such as fellow Chicago newsman Edward Price Bell, were often rebuffed by their editors; Bell attributed this to Curtis' status as a "celebrity journalist" who was unusually popular and politically influential.

Curtis served as President of the Gridiron Club in 1903. In 1905, Curtis was Vice President of the Society of American Authors.

== Political involvement ==
Curtis and the Inter Ocean publicly supported the renomination of President Chester A. Arthur at the 1884 Republican National Convention. Although Arthur's campaign was unsuccessful and never in serious contention, the lame duck President rewarded Curtis' partisanship with his first diplomatic appointment as Secretary of the Latin American Trade Commission. The nomination encountered opposition from Illinois Senator John A. Logan, the unsuccessful Republican nominee for Vice President in the 1884 election, who blamed the pro-Arthur effort for needlessly fracturing the party. Logan also resented Curtis' reporting on his son-in-law William Tucker's land speculation at the Zuni Indian Reservation and accused Curtis of making "damaging disclosures... to the Democratic National Committee." Curtis denied this, threatening to mobilize his press resources against Logan's 1885 re-election if the Senator did not relent. Nonetheless, Curtis was confirmed and Logan was victorious.

Some of Curtis' contemporaries publicly criticized his political machinations, such as when The Nation asserted in October 1889 that it was "a well known fact that his pen has long been for hire." In 1896, Curtis was employed as a "special agent" by the Subcommittee on Reciprocity and Commercial Treaties of the United States House Committee on Ways and Means.

Correspondence indicates that Curtis was an informal advisor to President Theodore Roosevelt. In January 1902, Curtis wrote to the President to compare the American occupation of the Philippines to instability in the Bosnia Vilayet prior to the 1878 Austro-Hungarian invasion. He suggested that then-Governor William Howard Taft visit the Condominium of Bosnia and Herzegovina to observe how this situation was purportedly resolved. In January 1903, Curtis recommended that Roosevelt remove Victor E. Nelson, the US consul at Bergen, Norway, who had become unpopular due to allegations of corruption. Nelson resigned by March 2, 1903. In February 1905, Curtis gave Roosevelt advance notice of a month-long tour of five Southern states, offering to interview any person or cover any topic that the President desired. Curtis also counseled US Secretary of State Elihu Root on how to improve press relations.

== Pan-Americanism ==
Curtis ardently supported regular and friendly relations, as well as eventual economic and political integration, between all countries of The Americas, earning the nickname "The Patagonian". From late 1884 until he returned in the fall of 1885, Curtis held the title "envoy extraordinary and minister plenipotentiary to the republics of Central and South America" in his capacity on the Latin American Trade Commission. The group visited various capital cities throughout the region, laying the groundwork for hemispheric multilateralism, researching local economies, and advancing the interests of US exports. However, officials in Chile, Argentina, and Brazil – all under robust British influence at the time – were offended by the Americans' behavior.

Curtis seized on these travels to publish The Capitals of Spanish America in 1888. Domestically, the book raised his profile as an expert on Latin American affairs. However, The Capitals of Spanish America was regarded as superficial and inaccurate in Latin America itself. Curtis' political commentaries and cultural perceptions were often considered chauvinistic by his Latin American counterparts. A notable exception was Cuban nationalist José Martí's favorable review of Curtis' 1887 Harper's Monthly commentary on Argentine industry. Martí felt that Curtis was proposing symbiotic trade relations, and considered this a welcome alternative to continued exploitation by the Spanish Empire.

In 1889, Secretary of State James G. Blaine named Curtis as the State Department's executive agent in charge of planning the First International Conference of American States. The Latin American delegates, citing their dislike of The Capitals of Spanish America and Curtis' lack of Spanish fluency, protested his appointment. They demanded his replacement by two bilingual secretaries. Before the summit began on January 20, 1890, Curtis led ninety-eight people – including thirty-six Latin American delegates – on a six-week train tour of the United States, intended to instill camaraderie and showcase American industrial capacity.

Curtis was made Director of the Commercial Bureau of American Republics in 1890. The Bureau was a "hemispheric agency," meant to represent eighteen governments. Curtis, rather than the government, paid the $3,000 annual rent for the Bureau's offices near Lafayette Square. He served until 1893, when he was asked to resign by President Grover Cleveland. Curtis' lobbying secured the "reciprocity provision" within the 1890 McKinley Tariff, enabling the president to place duties on certain food and animal products only if other countries raised taxes on American goods first.

In 1908, he was appointed as a member of the executive committee for the Pan-American Committee of the United States.

=== World's Fair and museum curation ===
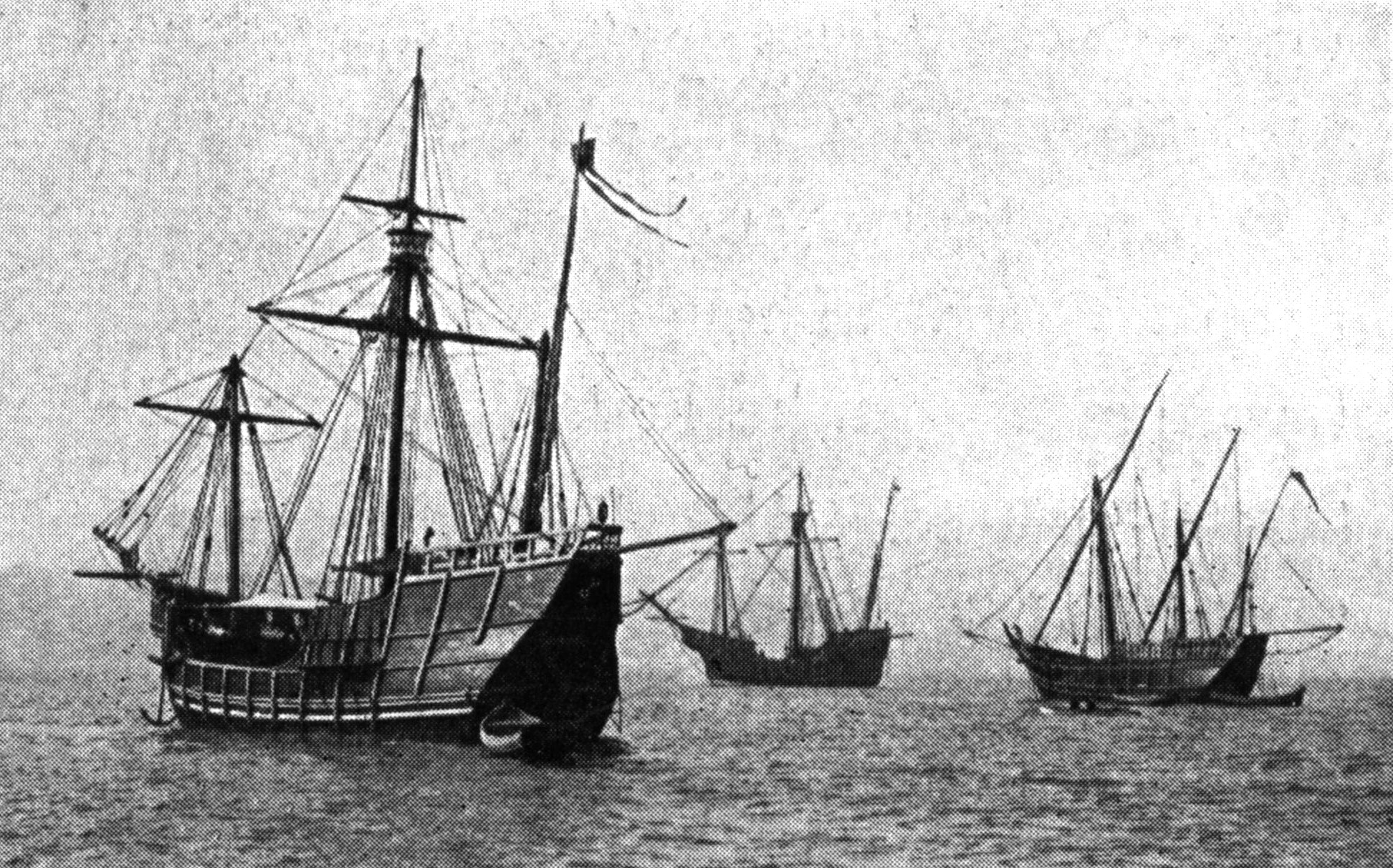
1893 replicas of the Niña, Pinta, and Santa María

Curtis served as chief of the Latin American Department for the 1893 World's Columbian Exposition, controlling a budget of $100,000 (equivalent to $3,600,000 in 2025). Curtis also represented the State Department on the Government Board of Management, an independent agency established by Congress to allocate funds for the exhibits of nine US cabinet departments at the exposition.

In 1891, Curtis went on another diplomatic tour of South America, convincing each country to send exhibits to Chicago. Curtis was a special envoy to the Queen Regent of Spain and Pope Leo XIII during 1892. His delegation sought assistance for commemorating Christopher Columbus' discovery of the Americas at the fair. Curtis conceived the display of replicas of the three ships commanded by Columbus in 1492. He also formulated a full-scale replica of La Rábida Friary, where Columbus had stayed prior to his voyage. To emphasize the connection of the Spanish monarchy to the discovery of the Americas, Curtis wrote extensively about the life and family of Cristóbal Colón, 14th Duke of Veragua, a direct descendant of Columbus and Spain's representative at the World's Fair.

In 1894, Curtis was an incorporator of the Field Museum of Natural History in Chicago; subsequently, he delivered many Latin American artifacts to the museum and was named an honorary curator.

== Personal life and death ==
Curtis married Cora Kepler on December 23, 1874. The couple would have three children: George Kepler, Eleroy, and Elsie Evans Curtis. In 1901, Curtis was awarded a Doctor of Letters by his alma mater, Western Reserve University. Curtis was the 1903 commencement speaker for Western Reserve University. He received a Doctor of Letters from Amherst College in 1907. In June 1911, Curtis was awarded an honorary Doctor of Laws from the University of Illinois. His son, Eleroy Curtis, attended Princeton University and worked with his father at the Chicago Record-Herald (formerly the Chicago Record).

On October 5, 1911, Curtis died suddenly of "apoplexy" at The Bellevue-Stratford Hotel in Philadelphia. He was 60 years old. Condolence messages were sent or published from public figures whom Curtis had known and advised, including President Taft, Vice President James S. Sherman, former vice president Charles W. Fairbanks, future vice president Charles G. Dawes, architect Daniel Burnham and former Associated Press president Victor Lawson. Longtime secretary of agriculture James Wilson, naturalist and surgeon H.C. Yarrow, newspaper publisher H. H. Kohlsaat, U.S. Army colonel Alexander Rodgers, and farm equipment manufacturer Charles M. Russell II were among the pallbearers at Curtis' funeral.

In 1932, Curtis' granddaughter, Polly Curtis, married Leonard Firestone, heir to the Firestone Tire and Rubber Company. In 1942, another granddaughter, Molly Mattis, married Captain Hutchinson Cone Jr., the son of US Navy Rear Admiral Hutchinson I. Cone. Through this marriage, Curtis was the great-grandfather of disability rights activist Curtis "Kitty" Cone. Also in 1942, a third granddaughter, Elsie Mattis, married longtime Illinois Congressman William L. Springer.

== Bibliography ==
During his career, Curtis wrote over thirty books:

- Tibbalses Folks (1875)
- Life of Zachariah Chandler (1879)
- A Summer Scamper. Inter-Ocean Publishing Company, 1883.
- Children of the Sun. Inter-Ocean Publishing Company, 1883.
- The Capitals of Spanish America. Harper, 1888.
- The Land of the Nihilist: Russia: Its People, Its Palaces, Its Politics. A Narrative of Travel, in the Czar's Dominions. Belford, Clarke, and Company, 1888.
- Trade and Transportation Between the United States and Spanish America. United States Government Printing Office, 1889.
- Handbook to the American Republics (1890)
- Guatemala (1891)
- Costa Rica (1891)
- Ecuador (1891)
- The United States and Foreign Powers. Flood and Vincent, 1892.
- The Existing Autographs of Christopher Columbus (1893)
- The Relics of Columbus: An Illustrated Description of the Historical Collection in the Monastery of La Rábida. The William H. Lowdermilk Company, 1893.
- Recent Discoveries Concerning the Early Settlement of America in the Archives of the Vatican (1894)
- The Yankees of the East: Sketches of Modern Japan. Stone and Kimball, 1896.
- The Authentic Letters of Columbus. Field Columbian Museum, 1895.
- Venezuela: A Land Where It's Always Summer. Harper, 1896.
- Today in France and Germany (1897)
- Between the Andes and the Ocean. Herbert S. Stone and Company, 1900.
- The True Thomas Jefferson. J. B. Lippincott Company, 1901.
- The True Abraham Lincoln. J. B. Lippincott Company, 1902.
- The Turk and His Lost Provinces: Greece, Bulgaria, Servia, Bosnia. Fleming H. Revell Company, 1903.
- Denmark, Norway, and Sweden. Saalfield Publishing, 1903.
- Today in Syria and Palestine. Fleming H. Revell Company, 1903.
- Modern India. Fleming H. Revell Company, 1905.
- Egypt, Burma, and British Malaysia. Fleming H. Revell Company, 1905.
- One Irish Summer. Duffield and Company, 1909.
- Around the Black Sea. Hodder & Stoughton, 1911.
- Letters on Canada (1911)
- Turkestan: The Heart of Asia. Hodder & Stoughton, 1911.
