= Eric Gugler =

American architect and artist (1889–1974)

- Born: March 13, 1889; Milwaukee, Wisconsin, U.S.
- Died: May 17, 1974 (aged 85); Orangetown, New York, U.S.
- Education: Armour Institute; School of the Art Institute of Chicago; Columbia University; American Academy in Rome
- Occupations: Architect; interior designer; sculptor; muralist
- Years active: 1911–1974
- Spouse: Anne Tonetti (m. 1932)
- Military career
- Allegiance: United States
- Branch: United States Army
- Unit: American Camouflage Corps
- Conflicts: World War I

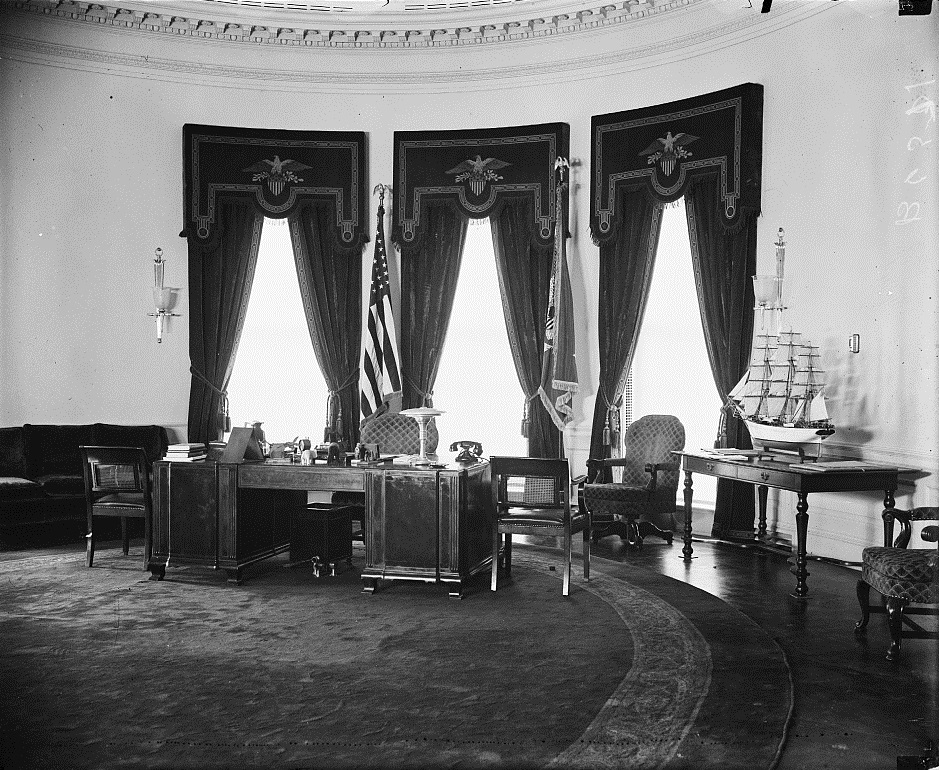
The newly built Oval Office in 1934.

Eric Gugler (March 13, 1889 – May 17, 1974) was an American Neoclassical architect, interior designer, sculptor and muralist. He was selected by President Franklin D. Roosevelt to design the Oval Office.

== Early life ==
Gugler was born in Milwaukee, Wisconsin, the son of printer and engraver Julius Gugler and his wife Bertha Bremer.

He studied at the Armour Institute in Chicago, Illinois, and the School of the Art Institute of Chicago. He graduated from Columbia University in 1911, and was awarded the 1911 McKim Fellowship in Architecture. He studied at the American Academy in Rome, 1911–1914. He returned to the United States, and worked in the offices of McKim, Mead & White.

During World War I, he served in the American Camouflage Corps (Company A, 40th Engineers, U.S. Army).

== Career ==
He opened his own architectural office in 1919.

=== Early works ===
With sculptor Paul Manship and muralist Francis Barrett Faulkner, Gugler created the American Academy in Rome War Memorial (1923–24). Installed beneath a portico in the courtyard of the Villa Aurelia, it features a pink marble bench flanked by kneeling doughboys, and surmounted by an arched mosaic mural of a lone sailor steering his boat through rough seas beneath the constellations.

Gugler altered a rowhouse at 319 East 72nd Street, Manhattan into Manship's residence and studio in 1925. Gugler later bought a 5-foot (1.52 m) diameter glass sphere etched with the constellations. He lent this to Manship, who created multiple sculptures inspired by it. For what became the Aero Memorial (plaster 1933), Manship modeled Zodiac figures in clay directly atop the glass sphere, then cast them in plaster and bronze. In projects together and separately, Gugler and Manship repeatedly returned to the idea of spheres, heavenly bodies and signs of the Zodiac. (Note: Manships's Celestial Sphere (1939) at United Nations Headquarters in Geneva, Switzerland is a larger (and rotating) version of the Aero Memorial. Gugler's original design (1958) for the Theodore Roosevelt Memorial was a giant armillary sphere. Manship and Gugler collaborated on an armillary sphere for the 1964 New York World's Fair.)

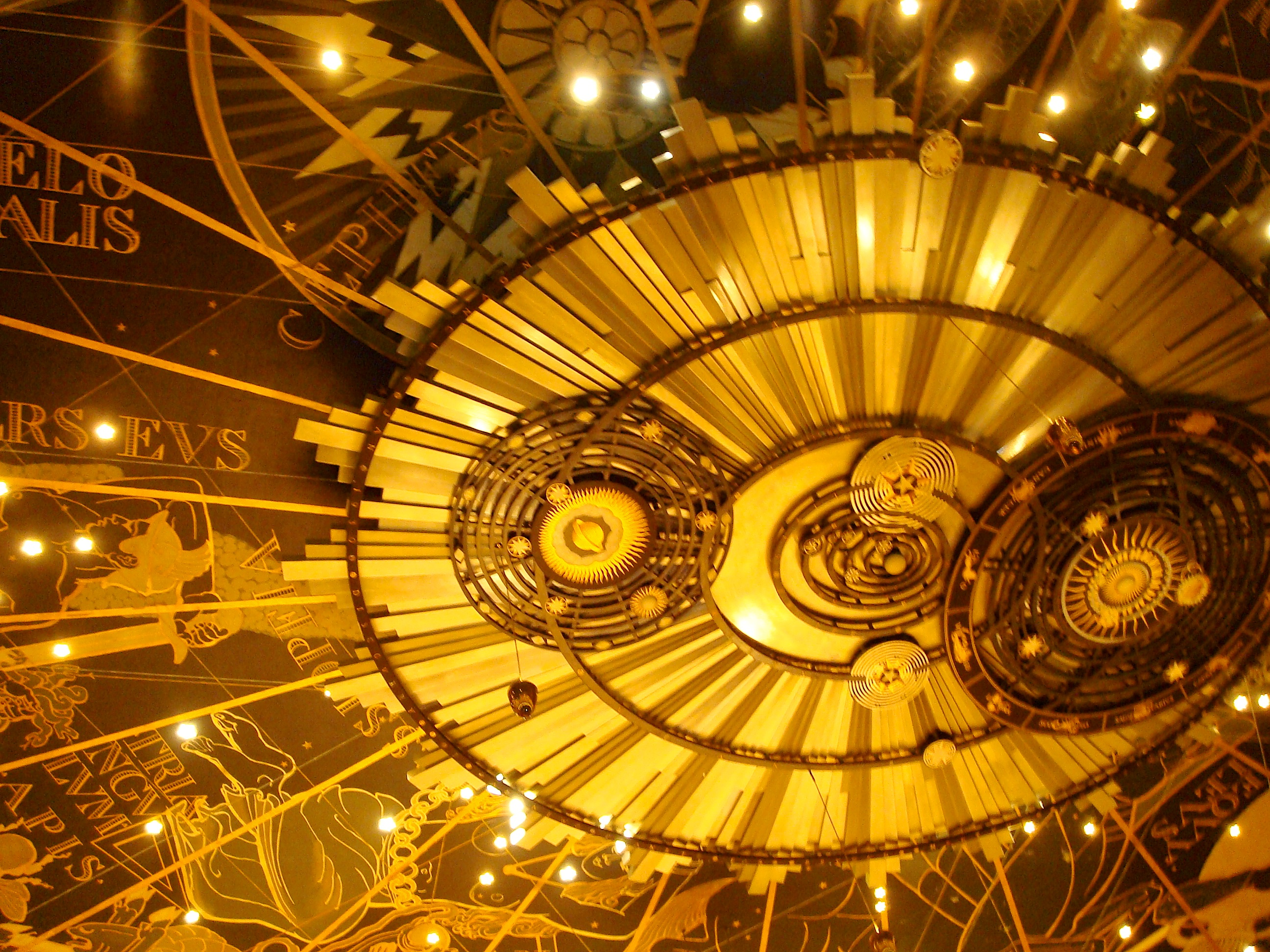
Forum Auditorium ceiling mural (1931), Harrisburg, Pennsylvania

Gugler and architect Roger Bailey won a 1929 design competition for the World War I memorial for the City of Chicago. Because of the Great Depression, the $3,000,000-to-$5,000,000 project was never built. Gugler designed a massive obelisk as a World War I memorial for Battery Park, at the southern tip of Manhattan. It also was never built.

Gugler and muralist Ricard Brooks created large Art Deco murals for the 1,883-seat Forum Auditorium of the Pennsylvania State Library and Education Building (1931) in Harrisburg. The walls of the semi-circular hall feature mural maps of ancient empires. The vast celestial ceiling mural depicts constellations and signs of the Zodiac, and incorporates lighting and ventilation fixtures. The building, by architects William Gehron and Sidney Ross, also features architectural sculpture by Lee Lawrie, Carl Paul Jennewein and Harry Kreis. The auditorium is home to the Harrisburg Symphony Orchestra.

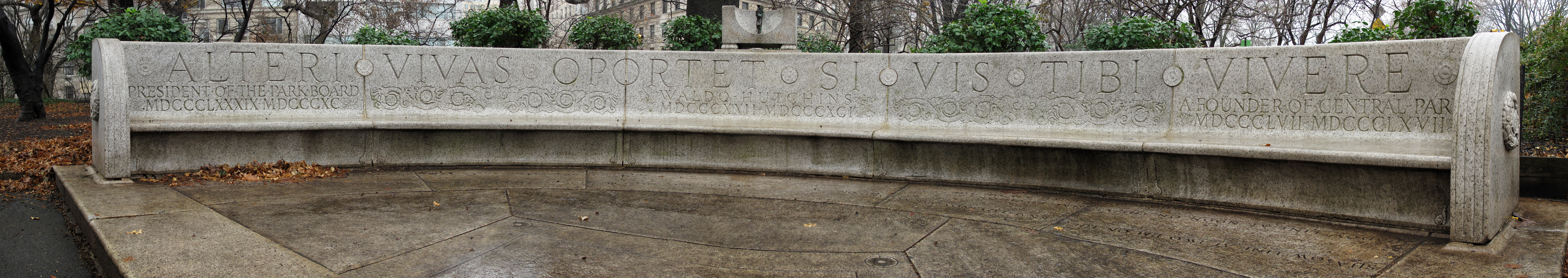
Waldo Hutchins Memorial Bench, Central Park, NYC (1932)

In New York City's Central Park, overlooking Conservatory Water, is the Waldo Hutchins Memorial Bench, a curved Concord white granite exedra designed by Gugler. The bench is almost 4 feet (1.2 m) tall, 27 feet (8.2 m) wide, and weighs several tons. It was executed in 1932 by the Piccirilli Brothers studio, the firm that carved the Lincoln Memorial in Washington, D.C. The bench has a small sundial, a variation on a 3rd century BC Hellenistic period Berossus sundial, at its back designed by sculptor Albert Stewart. The sundial features a small Art Deco bronze gnomon sculpture of a female dancer trailed by a wind-blown gown and flowing scarves at its center. The gnomon sculpture was modeled by sculptor Paul Manship.

Gugler collaborated with architect Henry J. Toombs on Georgia Hall (1932–33), the main building of Franklin D. Roosevelt's Warm Springs Institute in Warm Springs, Georgia.

=== The White House ===
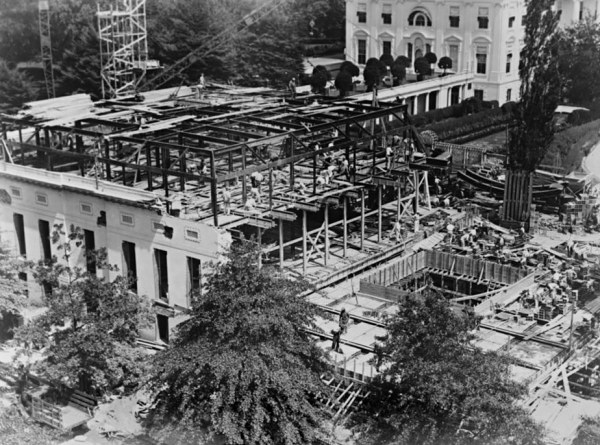
West Wing under construction, 1934.

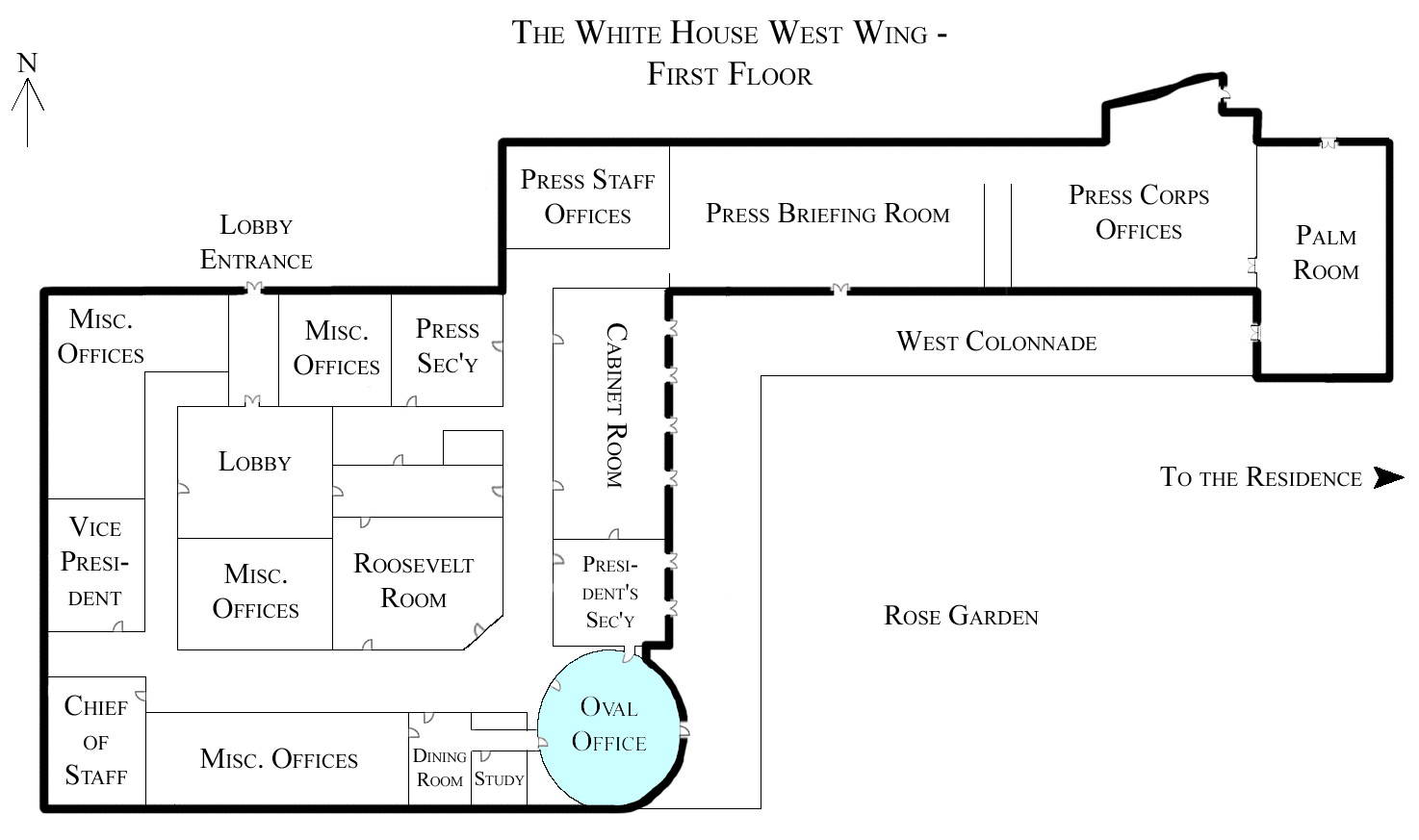
Location of the Oval Office in the West Wing.

Dissatisfied with the size and layout of the West Wing, President Franklin D. Roosevelt engaged Gugler to redesign it in 1933. To create additional space without increasing the apparent size of the building, he excavated a full basement, added a set of subterranean offices under the adjacent lawn, and built an unobtrusive "penthouse" story. The directive to wring the most office space out of the existing building was responsible for its narrow corridors and cramped staff offices. His most visible addition was the expansion of the building eastward for a new Cabinet Room and Oval Office.

Gugler served as consulting architect to the White House, 1934–48. He designed the Honduras mahogany case for the Steinway & Sons grand piano (1938) – serial number 300,000 – in the East Room. Albert Stewart modeled the large gilded eagles that are its legs. Dunbar Beck painted its gold-leaf mural that depicts five scenes of indigenous American music—a New England barn dance, a cowboy with guitar, a Virginia reel, a pair of black field hands singing, and Native American ceremonial dancers.

For the State Dining Room mantel, in 1945 Gugler designed the inscription of John Adams's 1800 benediction for the White House:

I pray Heaven to bestow the best of Blessings on this House and all that shall hereafter inhabit it. May none but honest and wise Men ever rule under this roof.

=== Later works ===
Gugler was a preservationist architect, and headed the 1939 restoration of Federal Hall National Memorial, on Wall Street in Manhattan. He was prominent in the 1940s public campaign opposing the demolition of Fort Clinton, Manhattan. He contributed to the restoration of The Grange, Alexander Hamilton's house in Manhattan; The Octagon House in Washington, D.C.; and other historic buildings.

He served as chairman of the Joint Advisory Committee on Planning and Development of the United Nations Headquarters, 1946–1948.

In the 1940s and 1950s, Gugler expanded the campus of Wabash College in Crawfordsville, Indiana, designing Waugh Hall, Campus Center (now Sparks Center), Wolcott and Morris Dormitories, Lilly Library, and Baxter Hall. He collaborated with sculptors James Earle Fraser and Donald De Lue on the Harvey S. Firestone Memorial (1950), in Akron, Ohio. He designed the setting for Fraser's Mayo Memorial (1952), in Rochester, Minnesota.

With sculptor Paul Manship and landscape architect Ralph E. Griswold, Gugler designed the Sicily–Rome American Cemetery and Memorial (1956), in Nettuno, Lazio, Italy, where more than 7,800 U.S. soldiers from World War II are buried. Gugler's chapel ceiling mural depicts the positions of the stars and planets on January 22, 1944, at the hour when the Battle of Anzio commenced. Manship and Gugler were awarded the National Sculpture Society's Henry Hering Medal, for noteworthy collaboration between sculptor and architect.

Gugler collaborated with Manship on an ornate armillary sphere for the 1964 New York World's Fair. They also collaborated on the FDR Memorial Block (1965), outside the National Archives Building in Washington, D.C.; and the Theodore Roosevelt Memorial (1967), on Theodore Roosevelt Island in the Potomac River, opposite the national capital.

==== Hall of Our History ====
Gugler spent decades working on a project he called The Hall of Our History. Conceived in 1938 as a national monument that would illustrate American history through sculpture, it was intended for a site at Pine Mountain, Georgia, near Franklin D. Roosevelt's Little White House. World War II put the idea on hold, but it was revived post-war as a shrine to the late president. Former First Lady Eleanor Roosevelt supported and helped to publicize the Georgia project. A corporation was organized to shepherd it through to completion, but the estimated $25,000,000 cost and obscure location made fund-raising difficult, and the corporation was dissolved in 1954.

The project was resurrected in 1957, proposed for one of the most prominent locations in the United States: Arlington Ridge Park, on the west side of the Potomac River, between Arlington National Cemetery and the Marine Corps War Memorial. This was the visual terminus of the National Mall, on axis with the U.S. Capitol, the Washington Monument, and the Lincoln Memorial.

=== Business ===
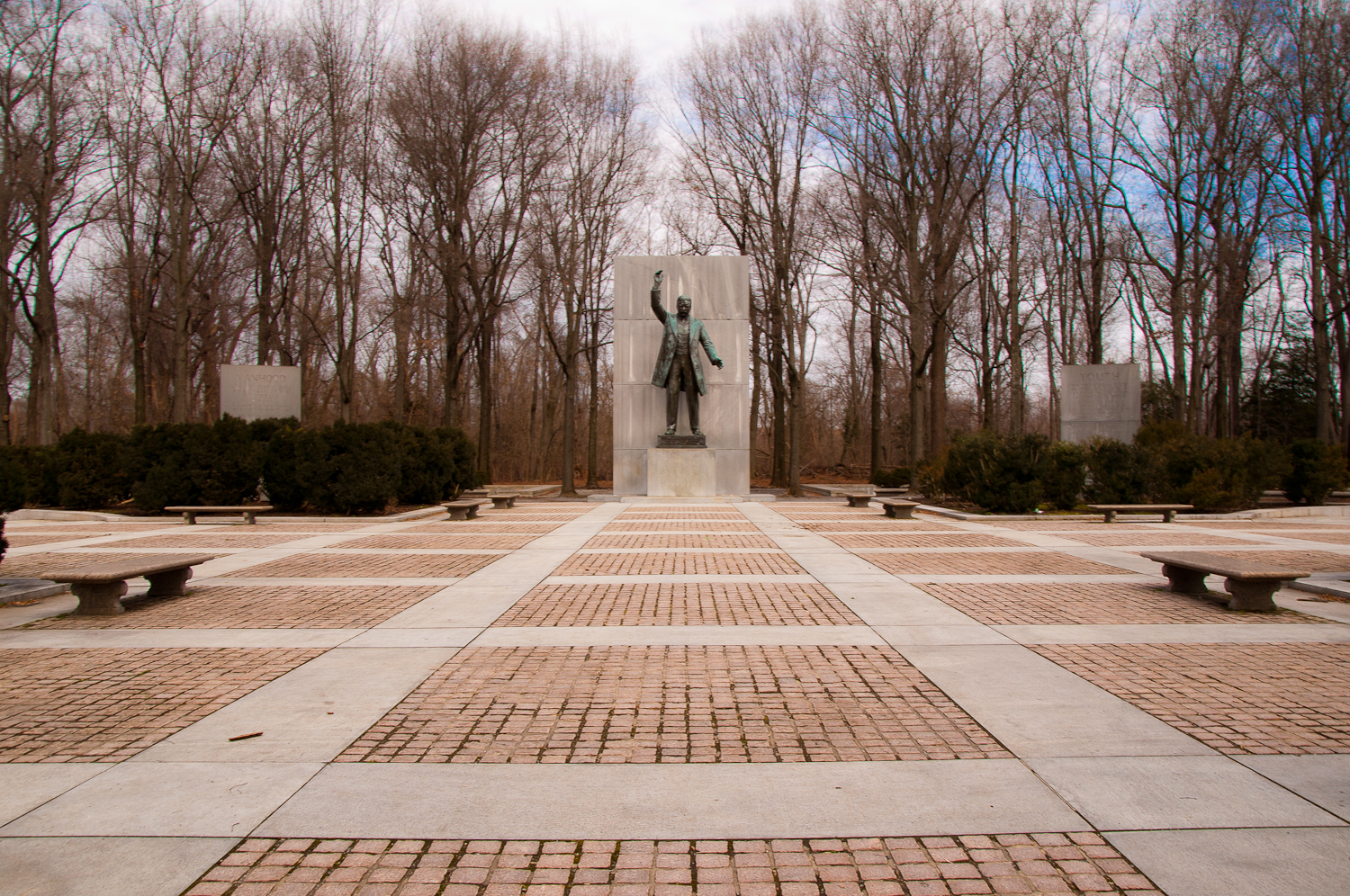
Plaza, Theodore Roosevelt Memorial (1967), Washington, D.C.

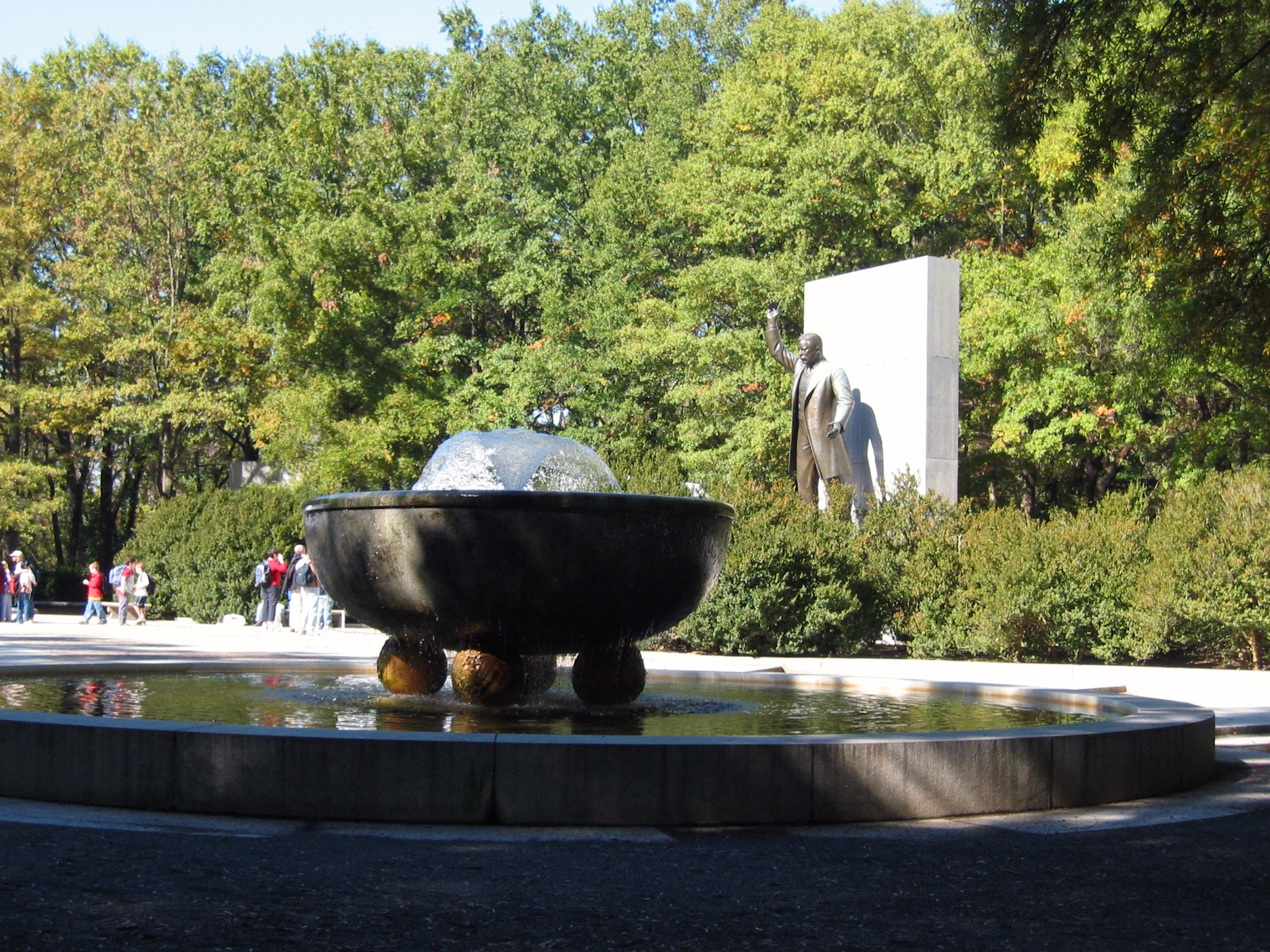
Fountain, Theodore Roosevelt Memorial (1967), Washington, D.C.

Gugler maintained his own office at 101 Park Avenue (17th floor), Manhattan, and collaborated on projects with architects such as Roger Bailey, Walker O. Cain, Ferdinand Eiseman, Henry G. Emery, Henry Powell Hopkins, and Henry J. Toombs. He formed a partnership with architects Richard A. Kimball and Ellery Husted.

=== Honors ===
Gugler served as a trustee of the American Academy in Rome, 1918–1945. He was elected a member of the National Academy of Design in 1941, and an academician in 1946. He was a member of the National Sculpture Society, a member of the National Institute of Arts and Letters, and a trustee of the American Scenic and Historic Preservation Society. He became a member of the American Institute of Architects in 1921, and was elected an AIA Fellow in 1939.

== Personal life and death ==
Gugler married Broadway actress and dancer Anne Tonetti in 1932. They were part of an artist's colony at Sneden's Landing in Orangetown, New York. He designed their house there, "Green Barn", where he died in 1974.

Gugler donated his White House papers to its Office of the Curator. His widow donated additional papers to the Archives of American Art at the Smithsonian Institution.

Paul Manship's relief portrait of Anne and Eric Gugler (1932) is at the Smithsonian American Art Museum.

== Selected works ==
- American Academy in Rome War Memorial (1923–24), Villa Aurelia, Rome, Italy, with sculptor Paul Manship and muralist Francis Barrett Faulkner.
- Murals for Forum Auditorium (1931), Pennsylvania State Library and Education Building, Harrisburg, Pennsylvania, with muralist Richard Brooks.
- Waldo Hutchins Memorial Bench (1932), Central Park, New York City, with sculptors Albert Stewart and Paul Manship.
- The White House:
  - Rebuilding of the West Wing (1933–34)
  - Oval Office (1933–34)
  - Cabinet Room (1933–34)
  - Steinway Grand Piano (1938), with sculptor Albert Stewart and muralist Dunbar Beck.
  - Inscription for State Dining Room mantel (1945)
- Business Systems and Insurance Building (1939), 1939 New York World's Fair, Queens, New York City, with architects John B. Slee and Robert H. Bryson.
- Master plan and alterations to Forman School (1939–40), Litchfield, Connecticut.
- "Chip Chop", Katharine Cornell summer residence (1937–45), Martha's Vineyard, Massachusetts.
- Harvey S. Firestone Memorial (1944–50), Akron, Ohio, with sculptors James Earle Fraser and Donald De Lue.
- Dr. William and Dr. Charles Mayo Memorial (1943–52), Mayo Park, Rochester, Minnesota, with sculptor James Earle Fraser.
- Sicily–Rome American Cemetery and Memorial (1950–56), Nettuno, Lazio, Italy, with sculptor Paul Manship and landscape architect Ralph E. Griswold.
- Armillary Sphere (1964), Flushing Meadows, Queens, New York City, with sculptor Paul Manship.
- Franklin D. Roosevelt Memorial Block (1965), outside National Archives Building, Washington, D.C., with sculptor Paul Manship.
- Eleanor Roosevelt Memorial Bench (1966), United Nations Garden, New York City.
- Theodore Roosevelt Memorial (1963–67), Roosevelt Island, Washington, D.C., with sculptor Paul Manship.
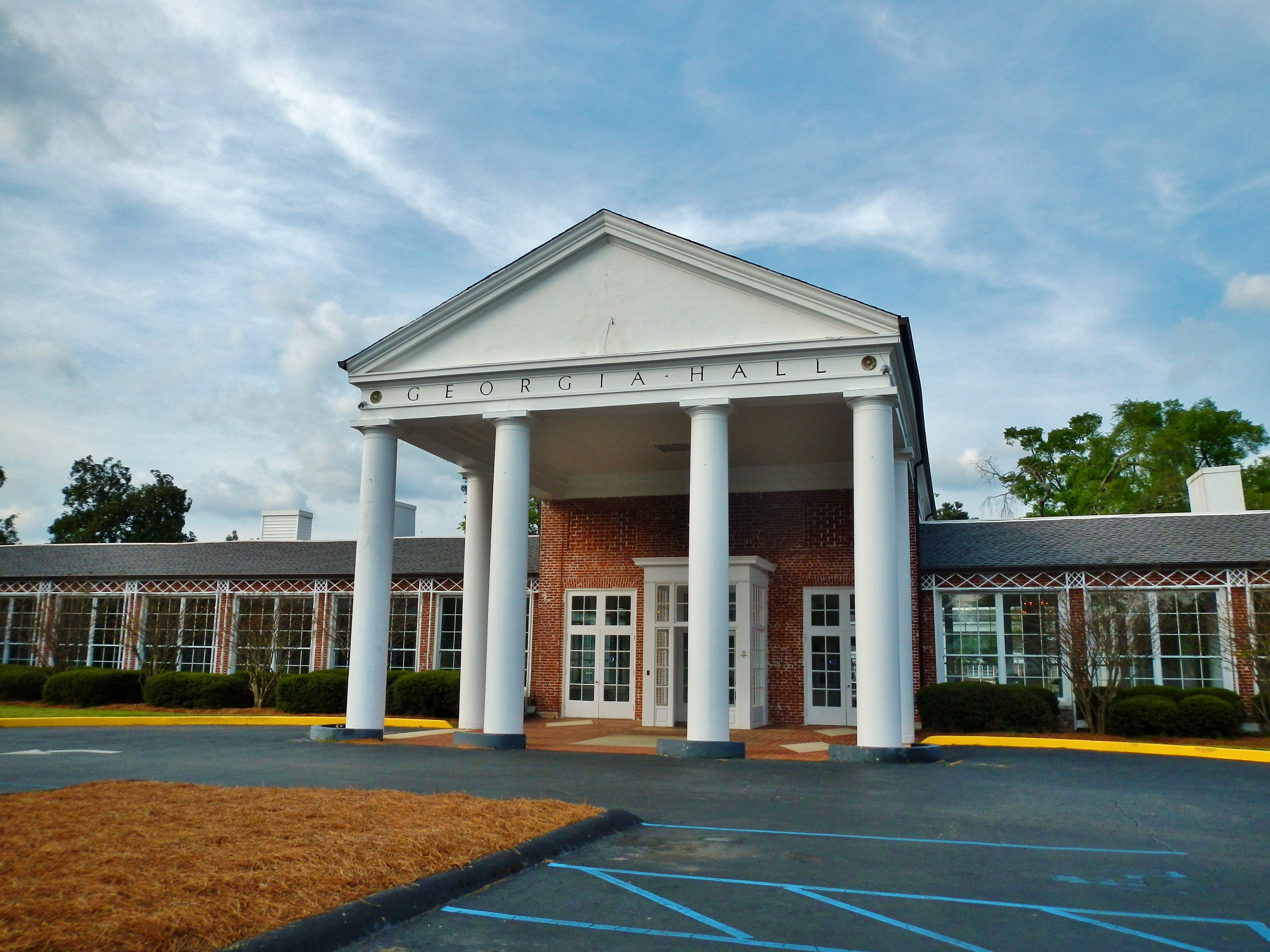
Georgia Hall (1933), Warm Springs, Georgia, with architect Henry J. Toombs

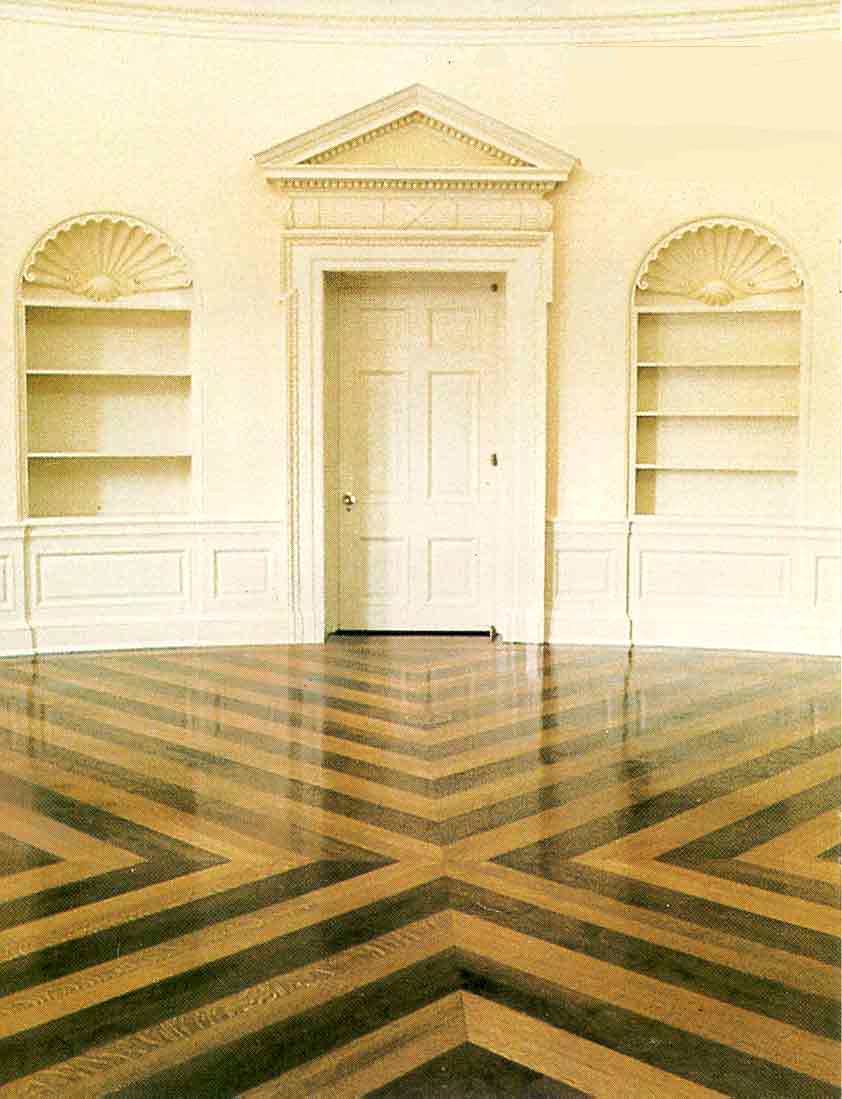
Gugler's 1934 design for the Oval Office floor was finally executed in 2005.

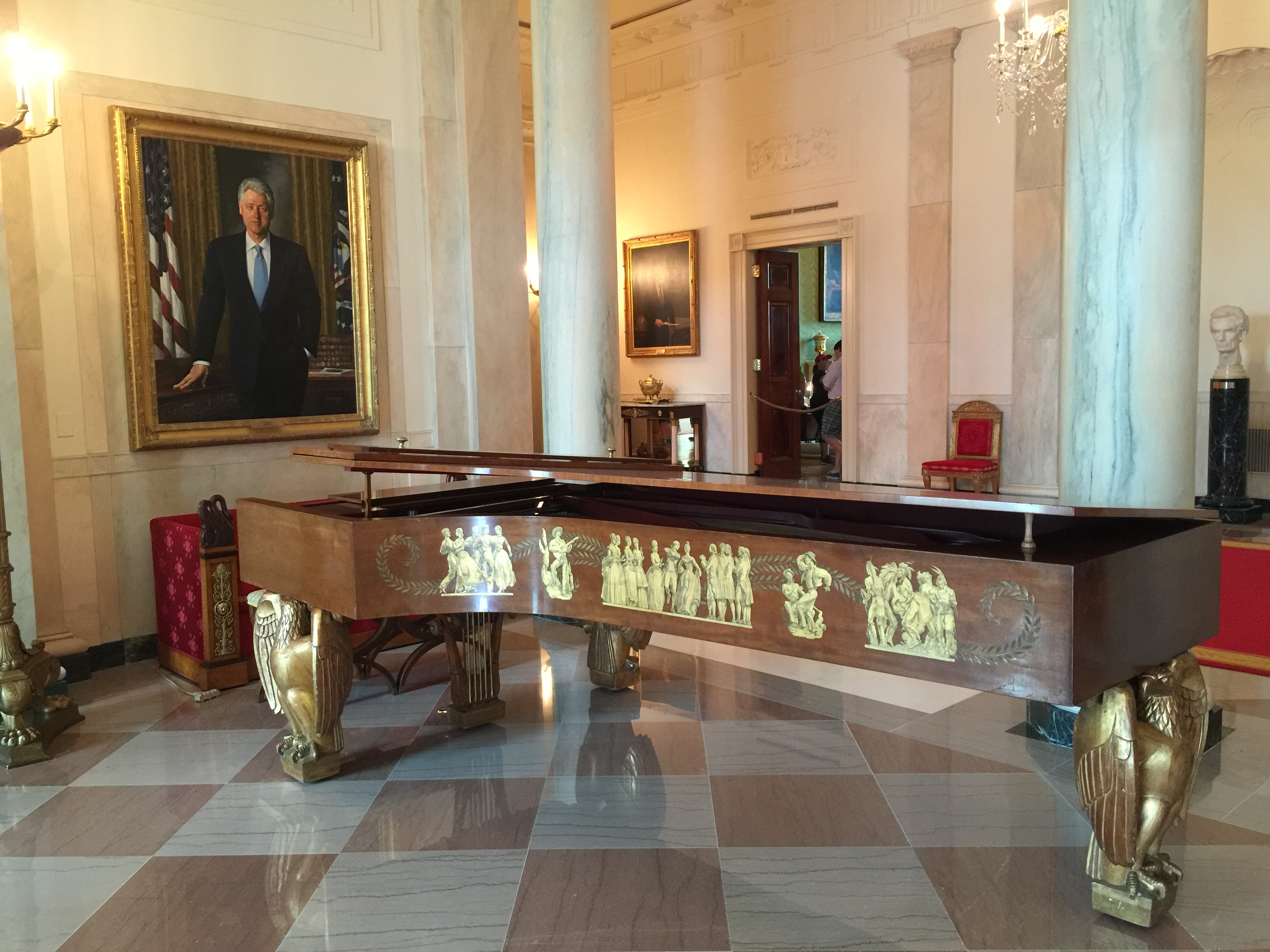
White House Steinway Piano (1938)

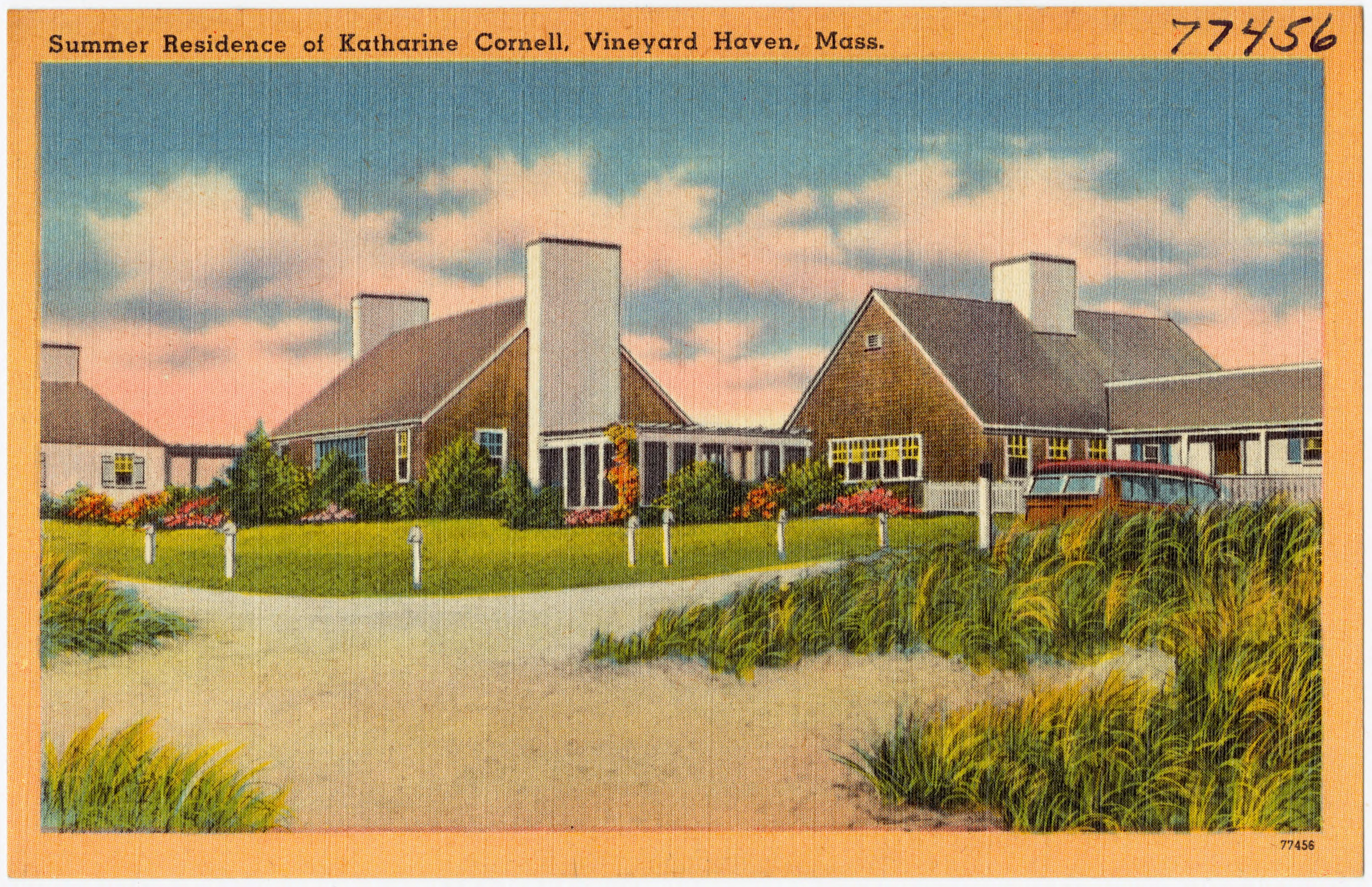
"Chip Chop" (1945), Martha's Vineyard, Massachusetts

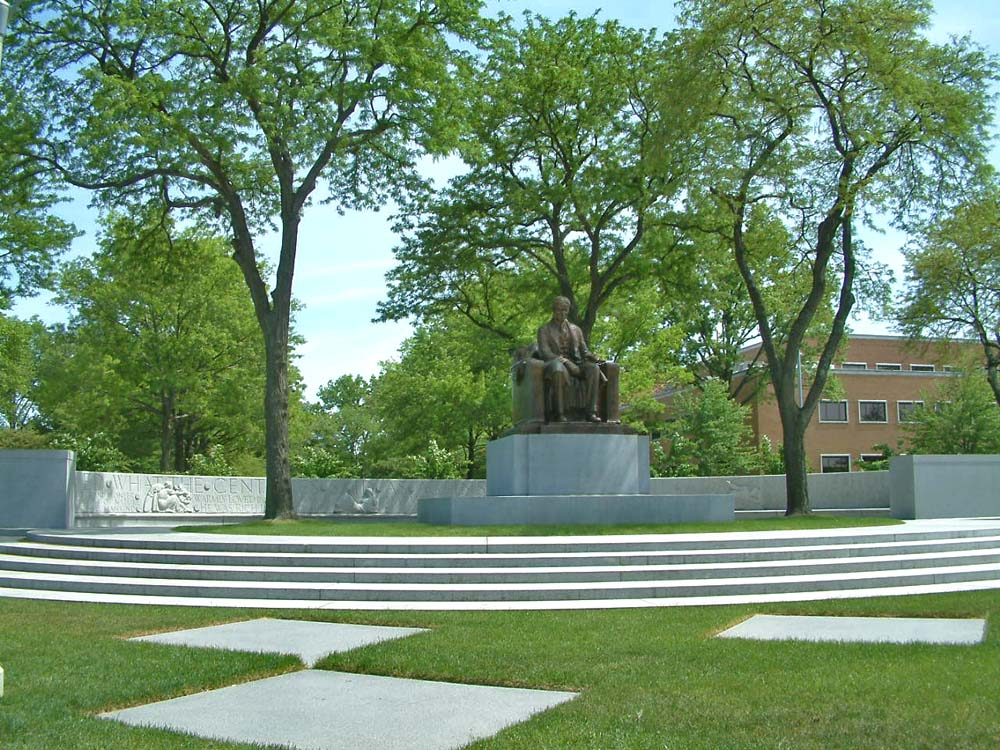
Harvey S. Firestone Memorial (1950), Akron, Ohio.

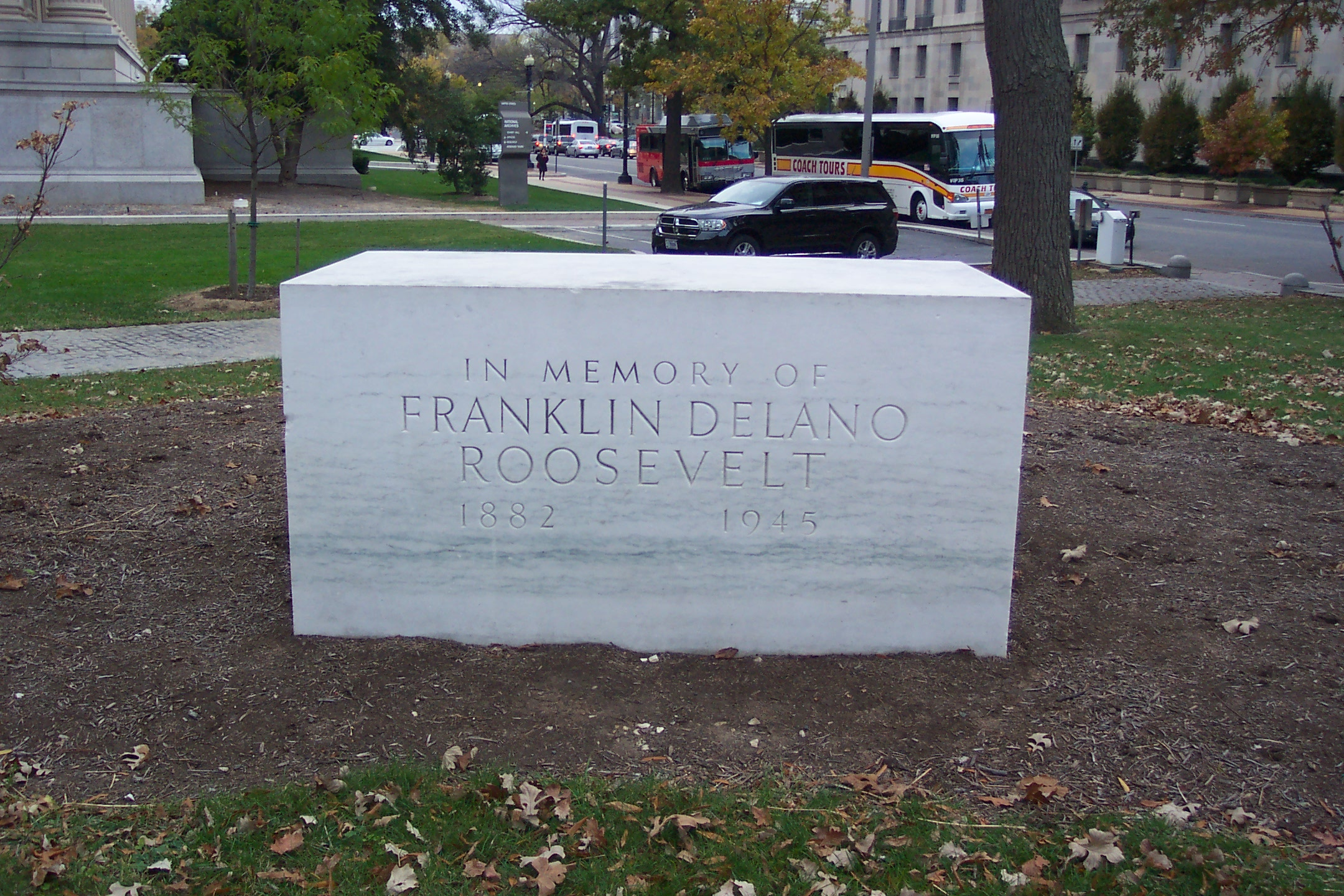
FDR Memorial Block (1965), National Archives Building, Washington, D.C.
