= Leonard Firestone =

American diplomat (1907–1996)

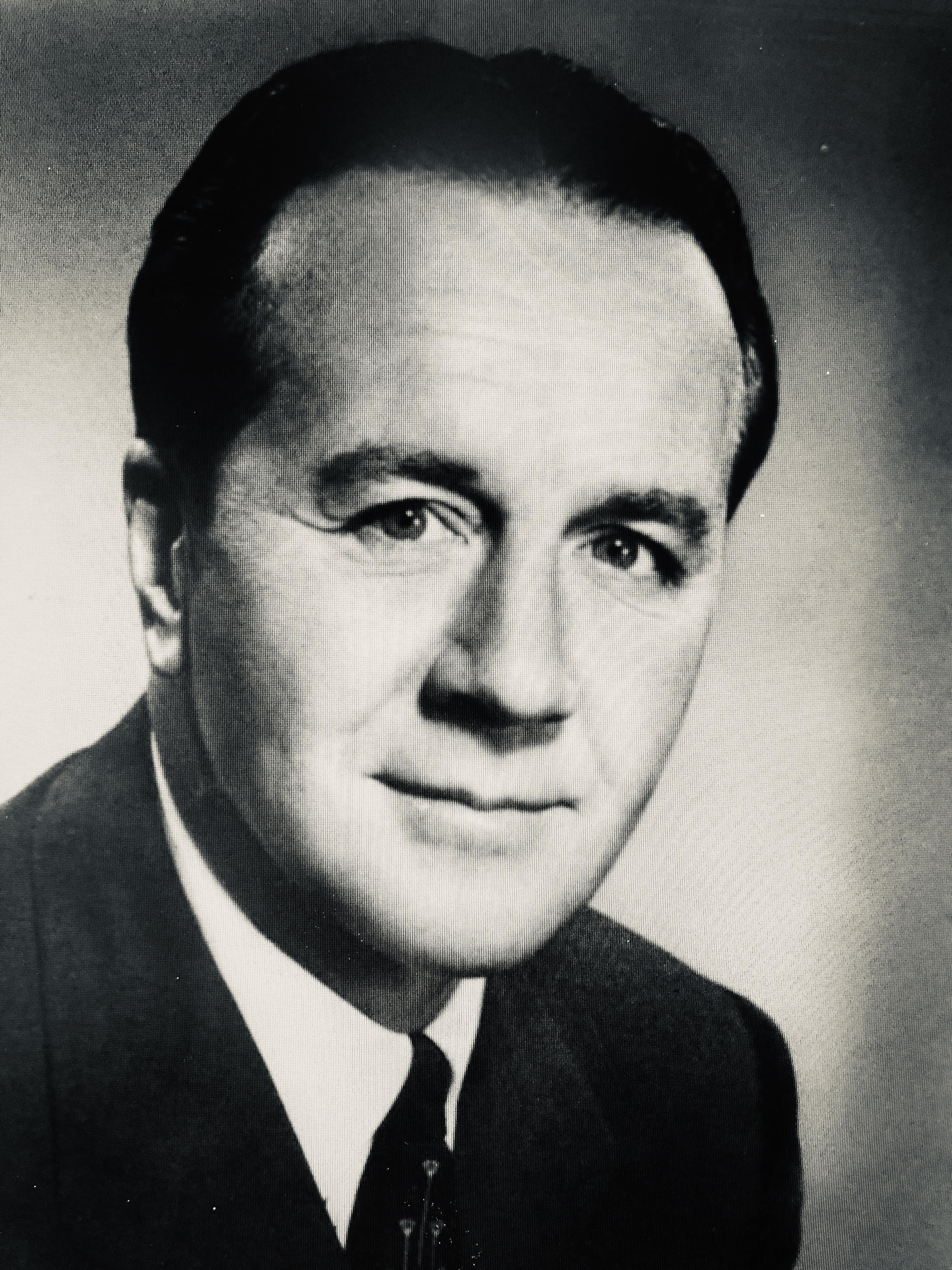

United States Ambassador to Belgium
- In office June 14, 1974 – January 20, 1977
- President: Richard Nixon; Gerald Ford
- Preceded by: Robert Strausz-Hupé
- Succeeded by: Anne Cox Chambers

Personal details
- Born: Leonard Kimball Firestone; June 10, 1907 Akron, Ohio, U.S.
- Died: December 24, 1996 (aged 89) Pebble Beach, California, U.S.
- Spouses: Polly Curtis (m. 1932; died 1965) Barbara Knickerbocker Heatley (m. 1966; died 1985) Caroline Hudson Lynch (m. 1987)
- Relations: Harvey S. Firestone Jr. (brother); Andrew Firestone (grandson)
- Children: 3, including Brooks
- Parents: Harvey S. Firestone (father); Idabelle Smith (mother)
- Education: Princeton University
- Profession: Businessman; diplomat

Leonard Kimball Firestone (June 10, 1907 – December 24, 1996) was an American businessman, diplomat, and philanthropist.

== Early life and education ==
He was born on June 10, 1907, in Akron, Ohio, to Harvey S. Firestone and Idabelle Smith Firestone. He was educated at The Hill School, and graduated from Princeton University in 1931, where he played golf and polo. He was a member of Alpha Kappa Psi, and later became a member of Bohemian Grove.

== Career ==
=== Business ===
After graduating from college, Firestone was employed by the family company in sales positions. In 1935, he was appointed sales manager and in 1939, became a director of Firestone. He was named president of Firestone Aviation Products Company in 1941. In May 1951 he was appointed to the executive committee of the California branch of the Committee on the Present Danger.

He was commissioned in the United States Navy as a lieutenant, but was assigned to inactive status to become president of Firestone Tire and Rubber Company in 1943. In 1966, he was the target of an abortive multimillion–dollar kidnap plan. He retired as president of Firestone's California operations in 1970.

Inspired by a 10–year local weather study, Firestone and two neighboring ranchers developed vineyards in Santa Ynez, California, in 1972. Firestone planted 250 acres (1.0 km^{2}) of vines, including 60 acres (240,000 m^{2}) of Chardonnay.

In 1975, his son Brooks decided to leave the family business and relocated his family to the Santa Ynez Valley. In partnership with his father, he founded the first commercial winery to crush grapes in Santa Barbara County. The vineyard served as the basis for the major development in California as a global source of wine.

=== Politics and diplomacy ===
A staunch Republican, Firestone was a delegate to the Republican National Convention from California in 1944 (alternate), 1948 and 1952. In 1954 he was elected to the city council of Beverly Hills.

Firestone was chairman of the Nelson Rockefeller 1964 presidential campaign. Firestone was appointed U.S. ambassador to Belgium by President Richard Nixon in 1974, and was reappointed by President Gerald Ford, serving until 1976. He was later chairman of the Richard Nixon Foundation.

In January 1977, former president Ford and Betty Ford moved into a home next to Firestone at Thunderbird Country Club in Rancho Mirage, which later led to the foundation of the Betty Ford Center.

=== Philanthropy ===
Firestone was a contributor to charities and served as president of the trustees of the University of Southern California and president of the World Affairs Council of L.A. He was a board member of several organizations.

Firestone took a particular interest in charities associated with alcohol abuse, and was cofounder of the Betty Ford Center in 1982. He was also director of the National Council of Alcoholism and also the Eisenhower Medical Center. Firestone also served on the advisory board of the ABC Recovery Center and was a major contributor to the expansion at the ABC Center.

== Personal life ==
In 1932, he married Polly Curtis, granddaughter of journalist and diplomat William Eleroy Curtis. They had three children, including Kimball Firestone and Brooks Firestone, who owned Firestone's Culinary Tavern in Frederick, Maryland. Polly died in 1965 of cancer. He then married Barbara Knickerbocker Heatley on March 4, 1966. She died in 1985 of cancer as well. He married Caroline Hudson Lynch on January 11, 1987, the daughter of the owner of Oklahoma Ada and Atoka Railroad and former spouse to Edmund Lynch, whose father co-founded Merrill Lynch. His grandson is reality TV personality Andrew Firestone. Leonard Firestone was buried at Columbiana Cemetery in Columbiana, Ohio.

== See also ==
- List of kidnappings

Diplomatic posts
Preceded by Robert Strausz-Hupé	United States Ambassador to Belgium; 1974–1977	Succeeded by Anne Cox Chambers
