= Idabelle Smith Firestone =

American composer and songwriter

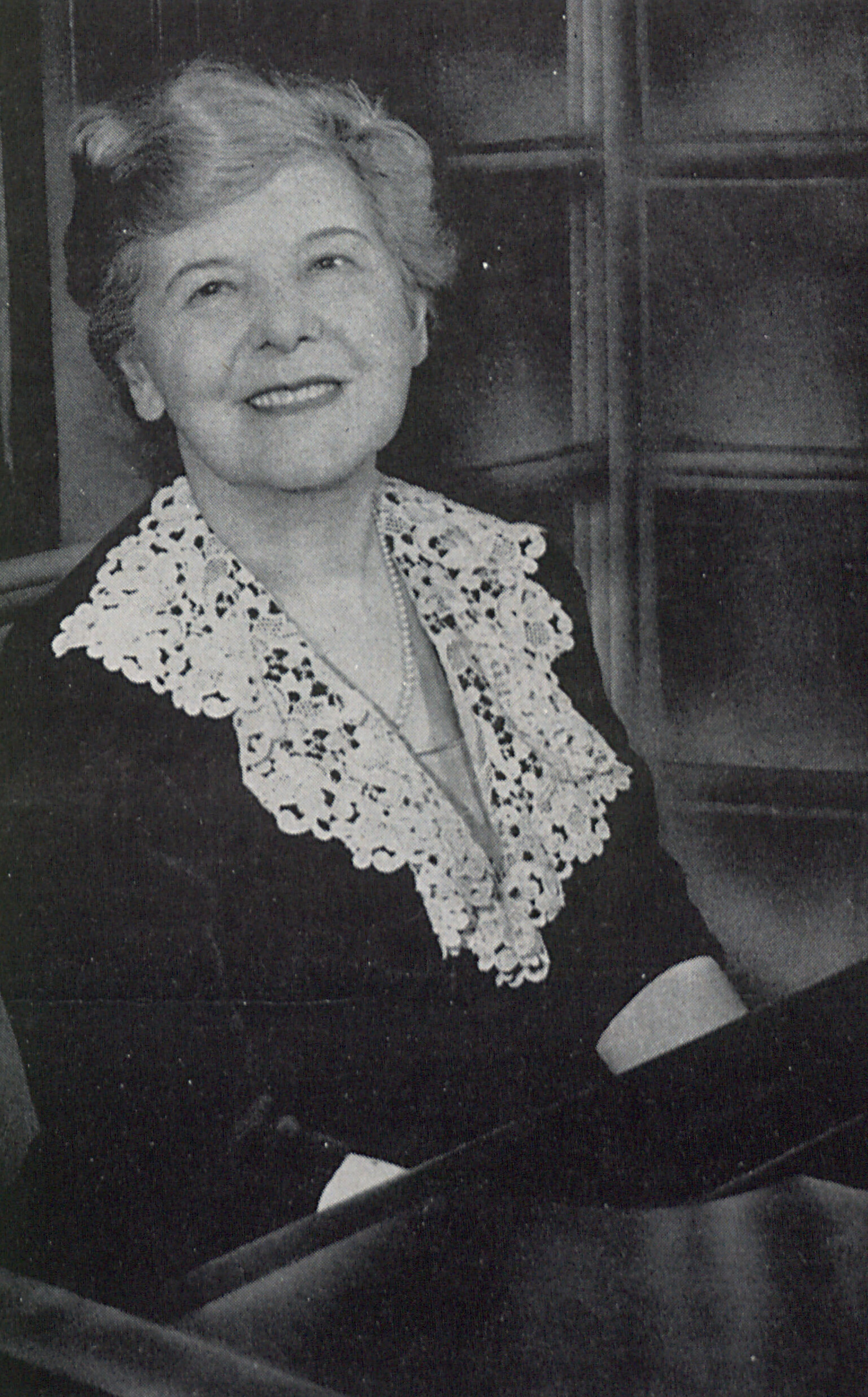
- Born: Idabelle Smith; November 10, 1874; Minnesota City, Minnesota, U.S.
- Died: July 7, 1954 (aged 79); Akron, Ohio, U.S.
- Spouse: Harvey S. Firestone (m. 1895; died 1938)
- Children: 7, including Harvey S. Firestone Jr. and Leonard Firestone

Idabelle Smith Firestone (née Smith; November 10, 1874 – July 7, 1954) was an American composer and songwriter.

== Biography ==
She was born in Minnesota City, Minnesota, to Eliza B. Allen (1843–1923) and George T. Smith (1841–1921), the youngest of five children. Her father was the inventor of a flour milling process that turns out "Patent" and "Half Patent" flour.

She learned to play piano and organ as a girl and studied music at Alma College, Ontario.

On 20 November 1895, she married Harvey S. Firestone, who had begun the Firestone Tire and Rubber Company five years earlier. She was the mother of Harvey S. Firestone Jr., and Leonard Firestone, the grandmother of Brooks Firestone, and the great-grandmother of William Clay Ford Jr., Andrew Firestone, and Nick Firestone.

She was not the only composer in the Firestone family. Her grand–daughter Elizabeth Firestone (b. 1922) composed music for the film Once More, My Darling (1949), which starred Robert Montgomery and Ann Blyth.

She died in her sleep at her home, Harbel Manor, after a long illness on July 7, 1954, at age 79 in Akron, Ohio.

== Musical career ==
She became a member of the American Society of Composers, Authors, and Publishers (ASCAP) in 1948.

Her compositions "In My Garden" and "If I Could Tell You" both were featured as theme songs for the program, "Voice of Firestone", a radio and television program of classical music from 1928 until 1959.

"In My Garden", to lyrics by Lester O'Keefe (1896–1977), was the opening and ending theme for the program in January 1938 until 1941 when licensing restrictions caused a temporary ban of its use for broadcasting due to it being ASCAP-licensed.

The new theme, "If I Could Tell You" to lyrics by Madeleine Marshall (1899–1993) was introduced in early 1941. Marshall was a singing coach, concert pianist and accompanist who taught English diction at Juilliard for over half a century. The ballad was dedicated to her husband who died in 1938 and her daughter, Elizabeth, who died the following year.

Many of Firestone's compositions were published and notated, including four orchestral works and multiple voices. Her work was often recorded and sung by opera singers of the time, including Richard Crooks, Lawrence Tibbet, Eleanor Steber, Robert Merrill, Joan Sutherland, Renata Tebaldi, and Richard Tucker.

Her eldest son, Harvey S. Firestone Jr. (1898–1973) was responsible for managing much of Firestone's later career, especially in regard to copyright issues and dealings with collaborators.

== Legacy ==
On 10 November 1973, through the support of the Harvey S. Firestone Jr. foundation, the Idabelle Firestone Audio Library was built at 290 Huntington Avenue, to house the Voice of Firestone collection and to provide listening and viewing facilities for the New England Conservatory's students.

The Idabelle Firestone School of Nursing at Akron City Hospital opened on 1 October 1929, built through Firestone philanthropy to educate women and provide quality, accessible healthcare for all. The school was demolished on 31 July 2020.

After her death, her sons made a sizeable donation to the church for the building of the Idabelle Firestone Memorial Chapel. The organ from Harbel Manor was redesigned and installed in the chapel. The new chapel was consecrated in April, 1958. Harbel Manor was torn down after Idabelle Firestone died, and the remaining property was sold.

== Works ==
- If I could tell you, for voice and piano (1940) Text: Madeleine Marshall
- In my garden, for voice and piano (1933) Text: Lester O'Keefe
- You are the song in my heart, for voice and piano (1938) Text: Margaret Speaks
- Bluebirds, for voice and piano (1941)
- Melody of love, for voice and piano (1945) Text: Madeleine Marshall
- Do you recall?, for voice and piano (1948) Text: Margaret Bristol
