= Firestone Walker Brewing Company =

American craft brewery

Coordinates: 35°35′45.2″N 120°41′45.63″W

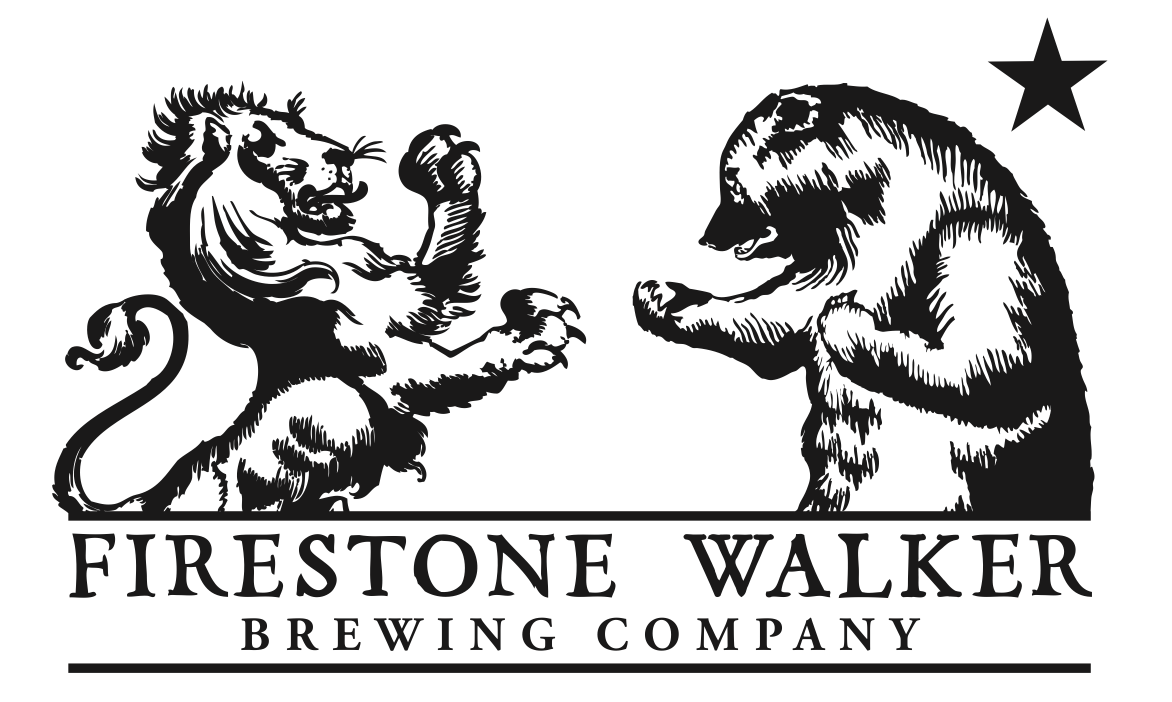
- Industry: Alcoholic beverage
- Founded: 1996
- Headquarters: Paso Robles, California
- Products: Beer
- Owner: Duvel Moortgat Brewery Adam Firestone & David Walker
- Website: www.firestonebeer.com

Firestone Walker Brewing Company is a craft brewery with operations in Paso Robles, Buellton and Venice, California. The brewery was established in 1996 by brothers-in-law Adam Firestone and David Walker. The original brewery was located on a family vineyard in Los Olivos, California. The main brewing operations moved to Paso Robles in 2001. Firestone Walker makes beers such as 805 and Mind Haze. Firestone Walker is California's second-largest craft brewery.

Firestone Walker was World Beer Cup Champion Brewery for mid-sized breweries in 2004, 2006, 2010, and 2012.

== History ==
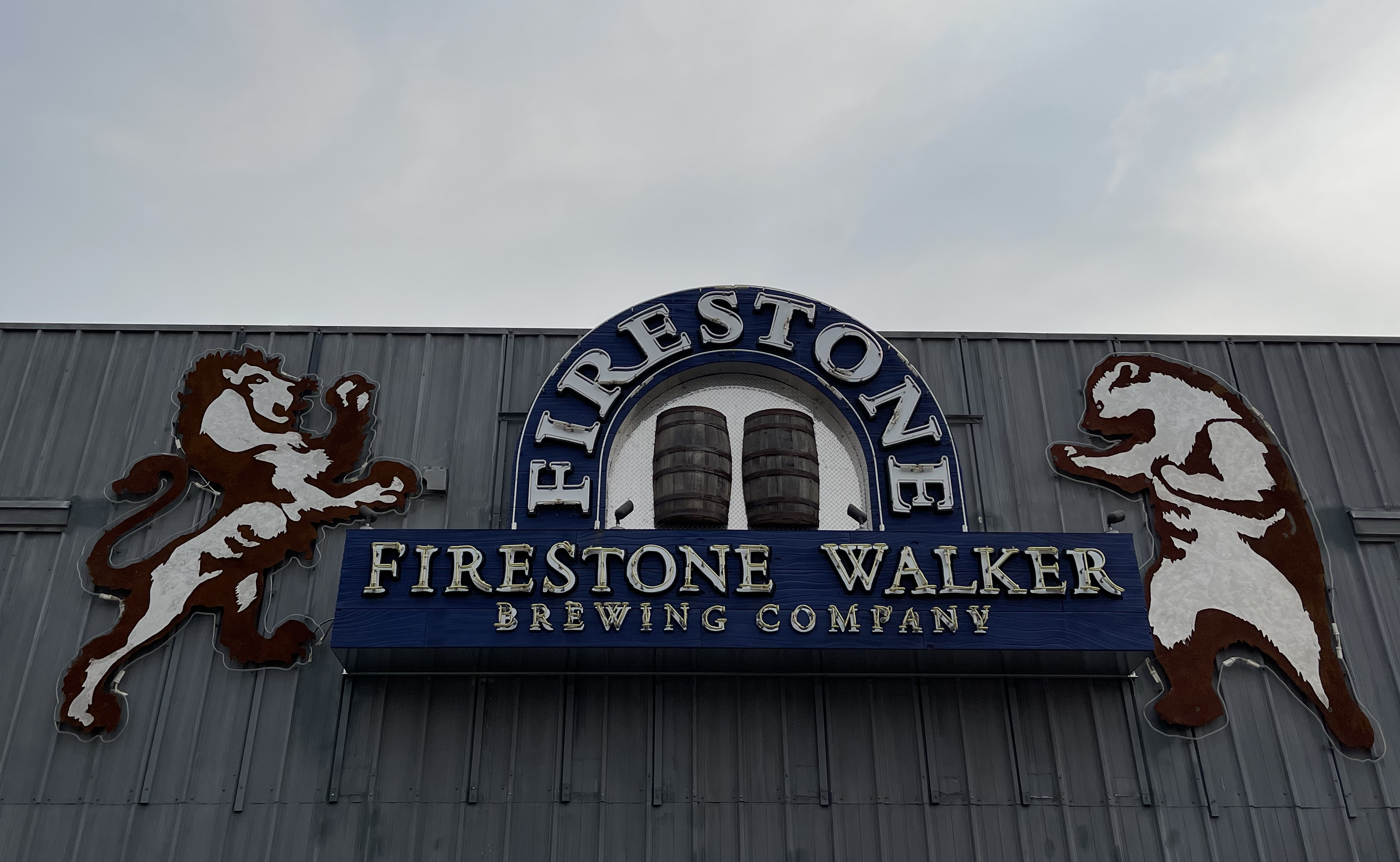
Firestone Walker taproom in Paso Robles, California, 2021

Firestone Walker Brewing Company was formed in 1996 in Santa Barbara County by David Walker and Adam Firestone, son of Brooks Firestone and great-grandson of Harvey Firestone who started the Firestone Tire and Rubber Company. The brewery started on the Firestone family vineyard in Los Olivos, California and moved to Paso Robles in 2001. The brewery’s first beer, Double Barrel Ale was made in a patented variation of the Burton union system.

In 2006 Firestone Pale Ale was named "Best Beer in America" by Men's Journal and in 2008, the company released Union Jack, an India Pale Ale. Firestone Walker started the Firestone Walker Invitational Beer Festival in 2011, for breweries that do not distribute to the West Coast.

In 2012, Firestone Walker was named "Champion Brewery and Brewmaster" in the category of Mid-Size Brewing Company at the World Beer Cup. It was a record fourth time that Firestone Walker had received this award since 2004. In 2015, Firestone Walker won the title of "Midsize Brewing Company and Brewer of the Year" at the Great American Beer Festival for the fourth time in 10 years.

In 2015, Firestone Walker merged with Duvel Moortgat Brewery of Belgium. Duvel Moortgat became the majority stakeholder in Firestone Walker. Founders David Walker and Adam Firestone remained as minority owners. Walker serves as CEO and Firestone sits on the board.

In 2012 and 2017 Firestone Walker expanded the brewhouse, and added a visitor center in the 2017 expansion.

In 2019, Paste Magazine named Firestone Walker "Best American Brewery of the Decade" for the period of 2010 to 2019.

In early 2021, Firestone Walker launched the Brewmaster's Collective, a beer club where members get beer in the mail.

== Operations ==
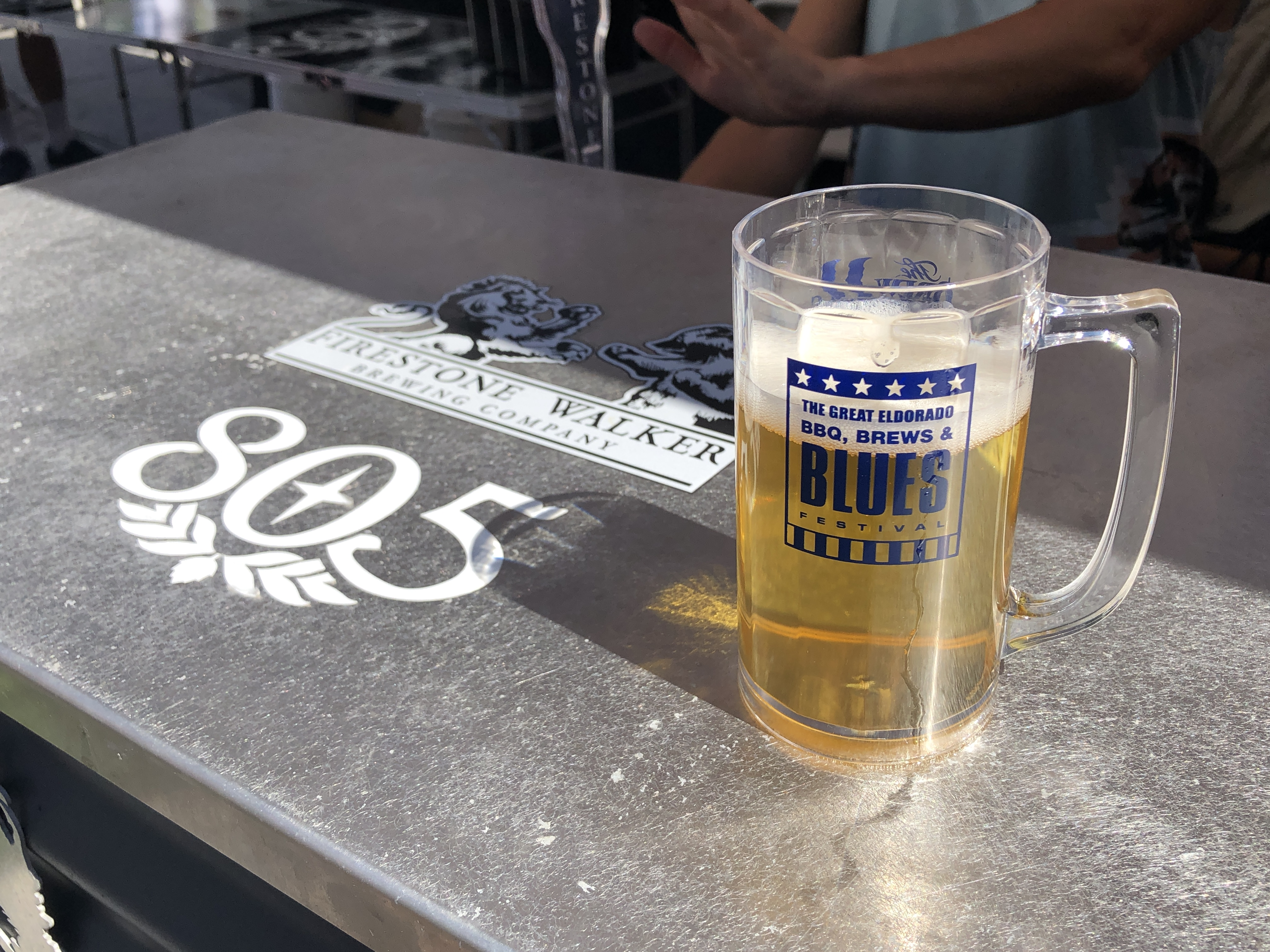
A glass of Firestone Walker beer at The Great Eldorado BBQ, Brews & Blues Festival 2019

Firestone Walker Brewing Company is one of only a few commercial brewers in the world to maintain a variation of the Burton Union fermentation system that uses interconnected oaken barrels.

In 2012, the company opened a separate wild ale facility in Buellton, California, called Barrelworks.

In 2019, Firestone Walker produced 521,000 barrels.

== Locations ==
=== Paso Robles Brewery ===
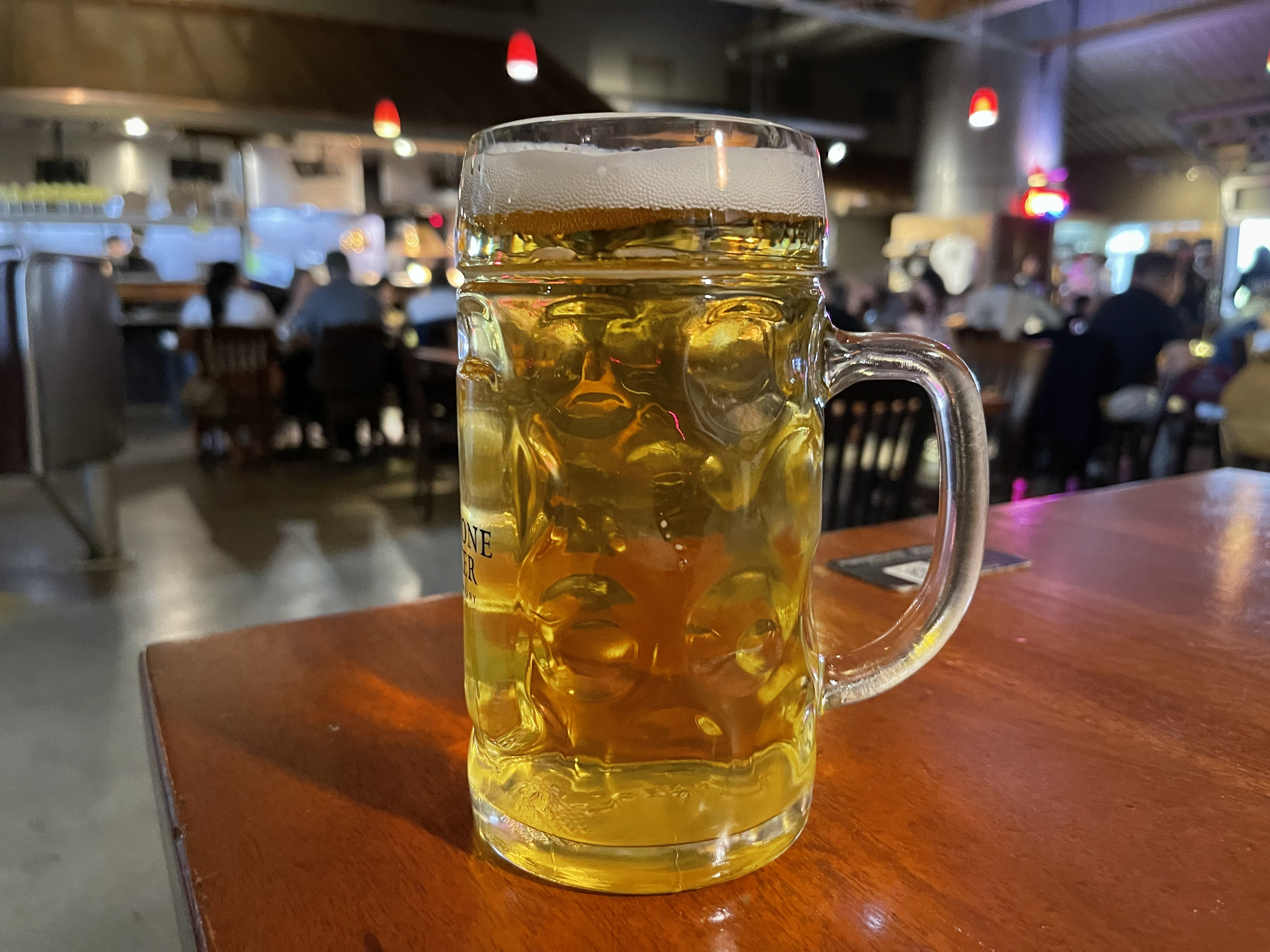
A 2021 Oktoberfest beer at the Firestone Walker brewery in Paso Robles, California

The majority of Firestone Walker beers are brewed at the main brewery in Paso Robles, California. In 2017, Firestone Walker completed a brewhouse extension that included a new visitor center. The brewhouse features vessels and equipment built by Huppmann, a brewing systems company based in Germany. The brewery campus includes a Taproom restaurant and a brewery emporium that features merchandise and tastings.

In late 2020, Firestone Walker launched a 2.1-megawatt solar array on 9.7 acres of land adjacent to the brewery. It is one of the largest on-site solar installations in the craft beer industry. The solar array accounts for a majority of the brewery's energy usage and offsets 3,000 metric tons of carbon emissions annually. The solar array is part of Firestone Walker's "Brewing for Tomorrow" initiative, which includes kettle steam recovery, water conservation and waste elimination. The brewery treats 35 million gallons of process water annually and returns it to the local aquifer. Each year, Firestone Walker feeds more than 20 million pounds of spent grain to local livestock.

The brewery's on-site wastewater treatment plant is used to purify process water and return it to the source in better condition than it was received. Steam from boiling wort is captured in a heat exchanger and is used to heat additional water, offsetting nearly 50 percent of the brewhouse's energy input.

=== Barrelworks ===
Firestone Walker opened its 7,000-square-foot Barrelworks wild ale cellar in Buellton, California, in 2013. Barrelworks beers are inspired by the Belgian sour beer tradition. The Barrelworks program is led by master blender Jim Crooks, a food science graduate and former quality control manager for the main Paso Robles brewery. Crooks first started making sour beers at the Paso Robles brewery, and the growing program later relocated to become Barrelworks. The first beer made at Barrelworks was called Feral One. Barrelworks is known for making wine-beer hybrids with local wine grapes, as well as beers made with fruits such as tangerines. The Barrelworks facility also includes a brewery Taproom restaurant.

=== Venice Propagator ===
In 2016, Firestone Walker opened its Propagator R&D brewhouse in Venice, California. The first beer brewed at the Propagator was Generation 1, a West Coast-style IPA. The Propagator features a small scale Kaspar Schulz brewhouse and operates as an R&D program for experimental brews. It also creates one-off beers available solely at the Venice location, which includes an on-site Taproom restaurant.

Firestone Walker's Mind Haze IPA was created after a year of experimentation at the Propagator. In 2021, the Propagator released Gen-5, marking the Venice location's fifth anniversary. Gen-5 is a hazy double IPA featuring Nelson Sauvin, Nectaron and Riwaka hops from New Zealand as well as Citra and Mosaic. The Propagator has been a catalyst for collaboration beers, such as Hippie Highway hazy oat IPA with There Does Not Exist and Talley Cat Sunflower IPA with Jennifer Talley. The Propagator also brews limited re-releases of Firestone Walker beers such as Wookey Jack.

== Beer Club ==
In 2021, Firestone Walker launched the Brewmaster's Collective, its first-ever beer club. Brewmaster Matt Brynildson said he had wanted to start a beer club for years, and that he drew inspiration from his local winemaking peers. The club features curated collections that are shipped to members throughout the year. The collections include specialty beers and club-exclusive beers from the brewery's Vintage and Barrelworks programs. Each collection comes with members-only provisions such as glassware, merchandise and food pairings. Membership also includes a welcome pack, virtual tastings with the brewers and other benefits.

== Brewmaster ==
Brewmaster Matt Brynildson joined Firestone Walker in 2001. He has been named "Champion Brewmaster" four times at the World Beer Cup and "Brewer of the Year" six times at the Great American Beer Festival, and has also received the Russell Schehrer Award for Innovation in Craft Brewing. Brynildson is known throughout the global beer community as an educator, collaborator and innovator.

Brynildson was an avid homebrewer while studying chemistry at Kalamazoo College in Michigan. He began his brewing industry career as a hop chemist at Kalamazoo Spice Extraction Company, starting "a lifelong love affair with hops". He later attended the Siebel Institute of Brewing Technology and joined Goose Island Beer Company, where he became head brewer at the Chicago Fulton Street production facility from 1996 to 2000.

In 2000, Brynildson moved to California to become brewmaster at SLO Brewing Company in Paso Robles. When Firestone Walker purchased the SLO Brewing facility in 2001, Brynildson stayed on board and took the helm as brewmaster of Firestone Walker.

Brynildson oversees all facets of Firestone Walker's brewing operations. He is also a brewing consultant for Hop Growers of America and has delivered hop presentations at brewing conferences and has taught at brewing schools across the United States and abroad.

Craft Beer & Brewing magazine stated in 2021, "With a background in chemistry, Brynildson has matched a technician's perfectionism to the soul of an artist, absorbing and deploying technical processes to make the best beer possible, while also exploring the creative edge of differentiation and expression that helps his beers stand apart from the crowd."

== Beers ==
=== 805 ===
In 2012, Firestone Walker released 805, a blonde ale. The beer was named in honor of the brewery's home region of the Central Coast (805 is the area code for Paso Robles, where Firestone Walker is headquartered) and was initially meant to be sold locally. However, demand spread to other parts of California and throughout the Western United States. In 2016, Firestone Walker decided to expand distribution of 805 to Arizona, Nevada and Texas. That same year, 805 became the top-selling craft beer in California. Distribution of 805 later expanded to Oregon, Washington, Hawaii, Montana and Idaho. 805 today accounts for more than 50 percent of the Firestone Walker's total beer production.

805 is recognized as one of the most successful beer brands launched in the past decade. 805 is built on grassroots marketing and the idea of a "California mindset that can be lived anywhere".

in 2021, 805 Cerveza was released as the first 805 line extension, following a test run in California. 805 Cerveza is billed as a California light beer brewed with lime.

=== Mind Haze IPA ===
Mind Haze IPA is Firestone Walker's top-selling beer next to 805. Mind Haze was launched in early 2019 as Firestone Walker's first national hazy IPA release. The beer is influenced by East Coast hazy IPAs as well as Bavarian Hefeweizens. Mind Haze was created after year of experimentation at the brewery's Propagator R&D brewhouse in Venice, California. Mind Haze is brewed with Cashmere, Mandarina, Azacca, Idaho 7 and El Dorado hops to create soft tropical fruit aromas and flavors. In 2021, Firestone Walker released Double Mind Haze, a double hazy IPA and the first extension of Mind Haze.

=== Double Barrel Ale (DBA) ===
Double Barrel Ale was the first beer brewed by Firestone Walker in 1996. Co-founder David Walker said that DBA "embodied all the hopes and dreams we had in launching the brewery." DBA is a British-style pale ale that is partially fermented in a "union" of oak barrels, inspired by the Burton Union method that was popularized in 19th century Britain. The brewery's first tap account for DBA—the Hitching Post II restaurant in Buellton, California—still carries the beer.

=== Union Jack ===
Union Jack was launched in 2007 as Firestone Walker's first IPA. Union Jack has been called "the standard bearer of the West Coast style". Union Jack has earned medals at the Great American Beer Festival, California State Fair, and European Beer Star Awards. It also earned a perfect 100 rating from Craft Beer & Brewing magazine.

=== Pivo ===
Pivo is a hoppy pilsner that was introduced in 2013. Brewmaster Matt Brynildson said that the recipe was inspired by great pilsners from Italy, Germany and the Czech Republic, and specifically by the dry hopped Tipopils by Birrificio Italiano. Beervana named Pivo as one of its 12 beers "that defined a decade".

=== Nitro Merlin Milk Stout ===
Nitro Merlin Milk Stout was introduced in draft in 2016, and in cans two years later. The cans are pressurized with nitrogen gas using a proprietary technique designed to provide an authentic draft-style nitro pour. The nitro format helps the beer achieve a smooth, creamy mouthfeel. The recipe also includes lactose, or milk sugar, to create a rounded body and mellow sweetness.

=== Anniversary Ale ===
The annual Anniversary Ale is a barrel-aged blend of beers made to commemorate the anniversary of Firestone Walker's founding in 1996. The first Anniversary Ale was called "10", marking the brewery's 10th anniversary in 2006. Each year, the Anniversary Ale is blended with the help of top local Paso Robles winemakers. The winemakers come to a blending session at the brewery each summer. They break into small groups and create their preferred blends from a variety of component beers. The individual blends are then blind tasted and voted on by the entire group, and the winning blend becomes the basis for the next Anniversary Ale. Paste Magazine observed that "the blenders and the brewery always find new, little things to make any given year stand out, whether it's occasionally letting a different beer take center stage, or incorporating new styles that have never been in the blend before."

=== Parabola ===
Parabola is a bourbon barrel-aged imperial stout that was originally created as a component for Firestone Walker's first Anniversary Ale. It was later released as a stand-alone beer. Parabola is variously aged in bourbon barrels from producers such as Heaven Hill, Elijah Craig, Four Roses, Pappy Van Winkle, Woodford Reserve, and Buffalo Trace. It carries a perfect 100-point rating on Beer Advocate.

=== Cali-Squeeze ===
Firestone Walker acquired the Cali-Squeeze brand from SLO Brewing Company in 2021. Cali-Squeeze is focused on fruit-forward hefeweizen beers and seltzers. Co-founder David Walker said that "this new brewing platform allows us to experiment in a way that doesn't impact our traditional beer programs." Firestone Walker re-branded Cali-Squeeze in the fall of 2021 under the mantra of "For a California state of mind".

== Firestone Walker Invitational Beer Fest ==
Firestone Walker launched the Firestone Walker Invitational Beer Fest in 2012. Attending breweries from around the world are personally invited by Brewmaster Matt Brynildson. The fest is held at the Paso Robles event center in Paso Robles, California. The fest is a fundraiser for Paso Robles Pioneer Day, a local nonprofit. The fest also includes local restaurants, live music, people's choice awards and "Behind the Beer" sessions with brewers. In 2017, Paste Magazine remarked that "the FWIBF is bringing together beer lineups on a yearly basis that are almost impossible to get elsewhere. The best of the best, not only from the U.S. but internationally as well." The fest typically sells all 2,500 tickets within 10 minutes of going live. The 2020 and 2021 editions were postponed due to the pandemic. The fest is scheduled to return in 2022.

== See also ==
- Firestone Vineyard
- Barrel-aged beer
