= Harvey S. Firestone =

American businessman (1868–1938)

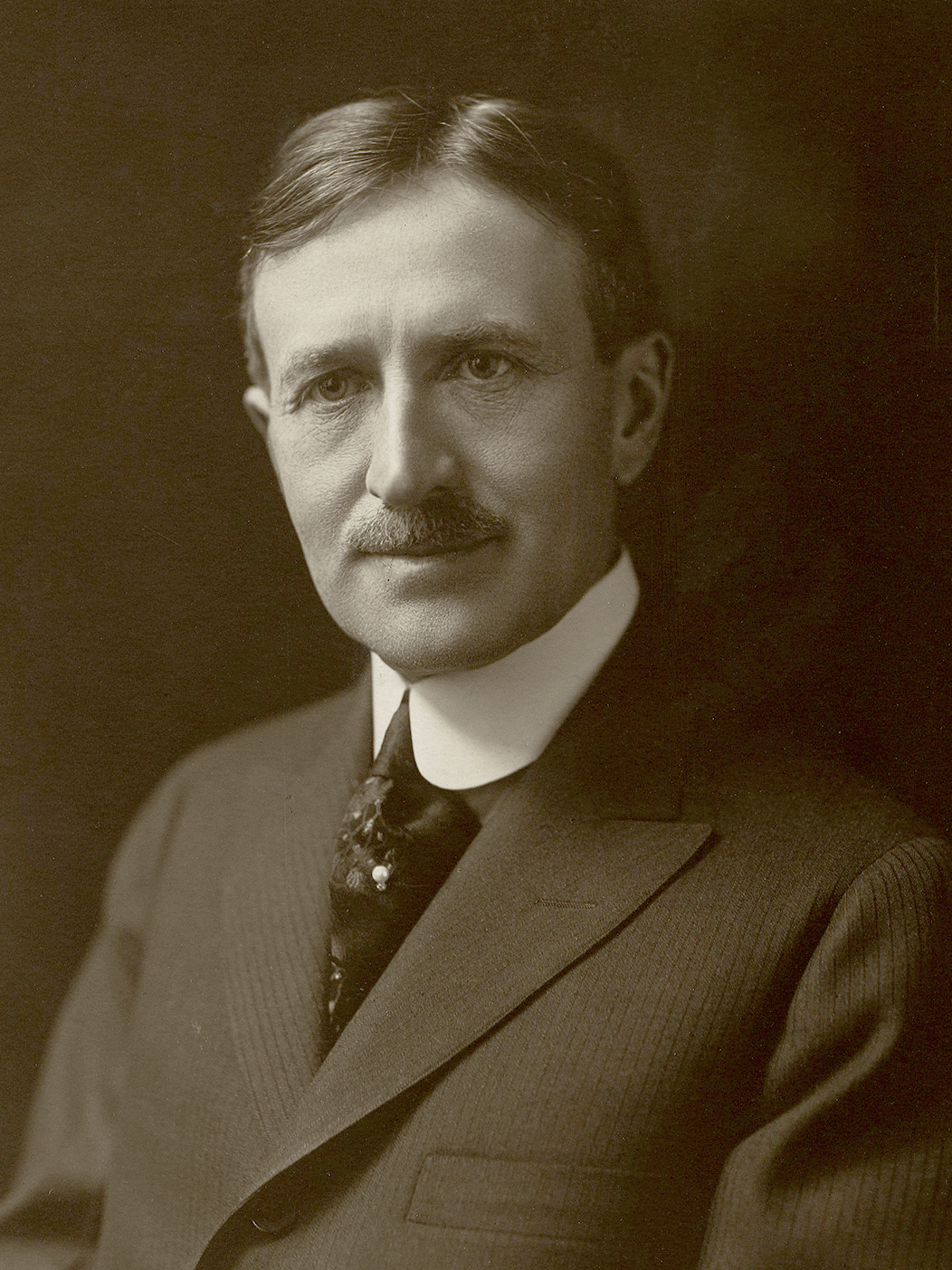
- Firestone, c. 1910
- Born: Harvey Samuel Firestone; December 20, 1868; Columbiana, Ohio, US
- Died: February 7, 1938 (aged 69); Miami Beach, Florida, US
- Occupation: Businessman
- Spouse: Idabelle Smith (m. 1895)
- Children: 7, including Harvey Jr. and Leonard
- Relatives: Brooks Firestone (grandson)

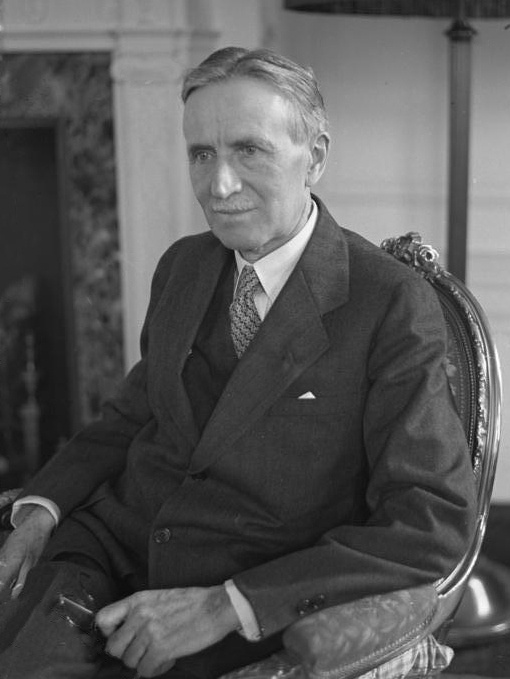
Firestone, c. 1931

Harvey Samuel Firestone Sr. (December 20, 1868 – February 7, 1938) was an American businessman, and the founder of the Firestone Tire and Rubber Company, one of the first global makers of automobile tires.

== Family background ==
Firestone was born in 1868 in Columbiana, Ohio, and grew up on the farm built by his grandfather. The family name was originally Feuerstein (German for flint or firestone); Nicholas Feuerstein, Firestone's paternal ancestor, immigrated from Alsace in 1752 and settled in Pennsylvania. He was the second of Benjamin and Catherine (née Flickinger) Firestone's three sons; Benjamin also had a son and a daughter by his first wife. In 1983, the original farm was disassembled and moved to Greenfield Village, a 90-acre (360,000 m^{2}) historical site in Michigan founded by Henry Ford, and is now part of a larger outdoor museum.

On November 20, 1895, Firestone married Idabelle Smith. They eventually had seven children. Notable great–grandchildren include: Andrew Firestone, Nick Firestone, and William Clay Ford, Jr. (the son of Henry Ford's grandson and Harvey and Idabelle's granddaughter Martha).

== Education and career ==
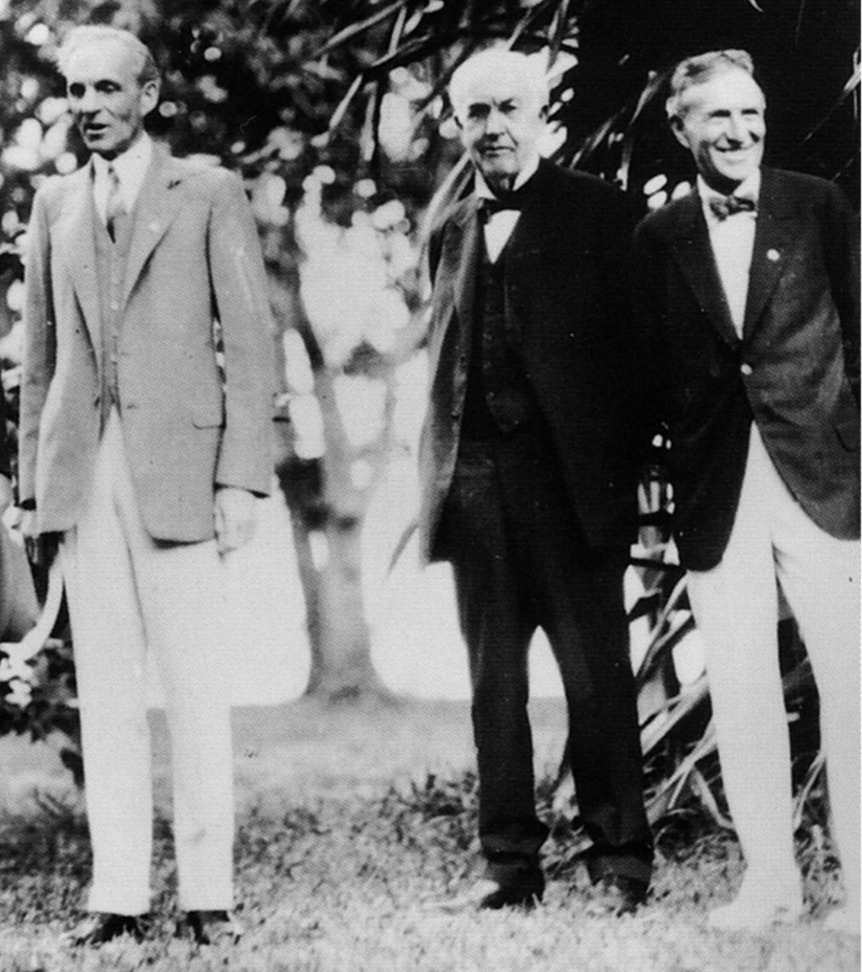
Firestone (right) with Henry Ford and Thomas Edison, c. February 1929

After graduating from Columbiana High School, Firestone worked for the Columbus Buggy Company in Columbus, Ohio before starting his own company in 1890, making rubber tires for carriages. In 1900, he founded the Firestone Tire and Rubber Company. In 1926, he published a book, Men and Rubber: The Story of Business, which was written in collaboration with Samuel Crowther.

== Liberia ==
According to a joint investigation from ProPublica and PBS, Firestone - while directly working as the head of his eponymous company - orchestrated a deal with Liberia to lease over 1 million acres of land to establish a rubber plantation, the largest in the world. This plantation took up over 10% of the country's fertile land, and the deal was set to last for 99 years. It was during this time that the Liberian government had forced indigenous villagers to work on the plantation, although investigators with the League of Nations found no evidence that Firestone itself “consciously employs labor which has been forcibly impressed". The town of Harbel was directly made as a company town for this plantation, named after Firestone and his wife, Idabelle.

This incident led his son, Harvey S. Firestone Jr., to run a public relations campaign to repair the public image of the company, portraying themselves as providing healthcare, job opportunities, and financial betterment to the region. This established an image that prevailed for decades while the company directly aided Liberian government officials in owning rubber plantations themselves, including the country's former dictator, William V.S. Tubman, who Firestone maintained close ties with.

This farm would later be compared to “an old Southern plantation" by Firestone executives. This is due to the plantation consisting of poorly paid workers who would live on company property in small, one-room dwellings with their wives and children. These dwellings lacked electricity, running water, and kitchens - with instead outhouses and communal kitchens relied on for sustenance. The workers' wives and children would often be employed as well due to a labor shortage.

== Death ==
Firestone died of coronary thrombosis at Harbel Villa, the beach front estate he acquired in Miami Beach, Florida. He was 69 years old.

== The Vagabonds ==
Firestone, Henry Ford, and Thomas Edison were generally considered the three leaders in American industry at the time, and often worked and vacationed together, calling themselves the Vagabonds, along with naturalist John Burroughs and, sometimes, Presidents Warren Harding, Calvin Coolidge, and Herbert Hoover.

== Legacy ==
The main library of Princeton University is named Firestone Library in his honor. It is among the largest university libraries in the world. On August 3, 1950, The Harvey S. Firestone Memorial, a large sculpture ensemble dedicated to Firestone, created by sculptors James Earle Fraser and Donald De Lue was dedicated at the old Firestone Tire and Rubber Company Headquarters at 1200 Firestone Parkway. It currently located at the Bridgestone Americas Technology Center in Akron, Ohio.

In 1974, Firestone was inducted into the Automotive Hall of Fame. Firestone High School in Akron, Ohio, is named in his honor. There is a Harvey S. Firestone Park in Columbiana, Ohio. The Links at Firestone Farms, a golf course in Columbiana that opened in 2003, sits on the site of the former family homestead.

He was inducted into the Motorsports Hall of Fame of America in 2013.

== See also ==
- Firestone Stadium
- Firestone Country Club
