= Firestone Vineyard =

American vineyard located in California

- Firestone Vineyard logo
- Location: California, United States
- Opened to the public: 1972
- Website: firestonewine.com

Firestone Vineyard is a family-owned estate winery on the Central Coast of the U.S. state of California, founded in 1972 as Santa Barbara County's first estate winery. Firestone Vineyard is one of the wineries along the Foxen Canyon Wine Trail.

== History ==
Firestone Vineyard was founded by members of the Firestone family in 1972, as Santa Barbara County's first estate winery. The winery was designed by Richard Keith & Associates, architects. The winery is located in rural Santa Ynez Valley near the town of Los Olivos in Santa Barbara County. It includes a barrel cellar, fermentation cellar, crush pad, tasting room and bottling line for full production. The winery is surrounded by 500 acres (2.0 km^{2}) of estate vineyards. In early 2007, Firestone Vineyard opened a companion winery in Paso Robles, with a focus on small lots of Bordeaux varietals from local vineyards.

William P. Foley acquired Firestone Winery and surrounding 400 acres (1.6 km^{2}) of land (300 acres under vine) in early August 2007 as part of a plan to expand his portfolio of small specialty wineries on the western coast. Foley owns Foley Winery in the Sta. Rita Hills AVA. As part of an evolving brokering of the deal, the Paso Robles facility - initially planned to stay in Firestone hands - was also purchased by Foley.

Firestone Walker Brewing and Curtis Winery remain in the hands of the Firestone family. Curtis Winery focuses on Rhône wines from Ambassador's and Crossroads vineyards, (which are owned by the Firestone family, and retained in the deal) and Voglezang vineyard which is independently owned.

As of July 2008, William Foley II remains the proprietor of Firestone Vineyard. Currently, Lorna Kreutz is the Director of winemaking and Daniel Spratling is the Associate winemaker.

== Climate ==
Vineyards in the Santa Ynez Valley lie on an east-to-west orientation of the surrounding mountain ranges.

Firestone Vineyards estate vineyards have an alternating climate of warm afternoons followed by cooler coastal evenings. Temperature swings of up to 50 degrees F are normal during the summer growing season which results in a long growing season. The estate vineyards soil is composed of gravelly loam with rocky subsoils.

== Paso Robles Winery ==
The Firestone Paso Robles winery focuses on small lots of Paso Robles-grown Bordeaux, including Cabernet Sauvignon and Merlot. The winery is located at the corner of California State Route 46 East and Airport Road near downtown Paso Robles and features a tasting room, barrel cellar, enclosed patio, estate vineyard and terraced gardens with picnic accommodations. Initial production is 4,000 cases annually.

Firestone Vineyard Paso Robles was opened in early 2007. Firestone Vineyard purchased Paso Robles fruit for several vintages, and the quality of the resulting wines was enough to make the decision to establish a new winery. Firestone Vineyards affiliated company Firestone Walker Brewing Company relocated its brewing operations to Paso Robles in 2001. The Paso Robles winery is managed by Andrew Firestone.

Paso Robles resides 25 miles (40 km) inland from the coast between Los Angeles and San Francisco in northern San Luis Obispo County. The coastline is bordered by the Santa Lucia Mountains, which trap heat during the daytime. In the evening coastal air moves through the Templeton Gap. This climate pattern is favored for Bordeaux wine production.

== Estates ==
Firestone Vineyard also manages Firestone Walker Fine Ales, a regional brewery founded in 1996, and Prosperity Wines, founded in 1991 by Brooks Firestone.
