= Whiz Kids (Department of Defense) =

Government think tank

The Whiz Kids was the name given to a group of experts, largely from the RAND Corporation, who U.S. Secretary of Defense Robert McNamara conferred with in his effort to modernize the management of the Department of Defense (DoD) in the 1960s. The objective was to shape an updated defense strategy in the Nuclear Age by bringing in economic analysis, operations research, game theory, and computing, along with implementing modern management systems to coordinate the massive, complex operations of the DoD with a set of techniques known as the Planning, Programming, and Budgeting System (PPBS). They were dubbed the "Whiz Kids"", an allusion to the group at Ford Motor Company that McNamara himself had been part of in the 1940s and 1950s.

== Notable personnel ==
- Harold Brown, nuclear physicist
- John M. Deutch, physical chemist and civil servant
- Alain Enthoven, economist
- William Kaufmann, nuclear strategist
- J. Edward Lundy, financial analyst
- Howard Margolis, journalist (later a social scientist)
- Merton J. Peck, economist
- Charles O. Rossotti, systems reformer
- Henry Rowen, national security expert, economist, and academician
- John H. Rubel, engineer
- Ivan Selin, research engineer
- Pierre Sprey, defense analyst
- Adam Yarmolinsky, academic, educator and author
- Richard Zeckhauser, economist
