= Whiz Kids (Ford) =

Group of ten United States Army Air Forces veterans

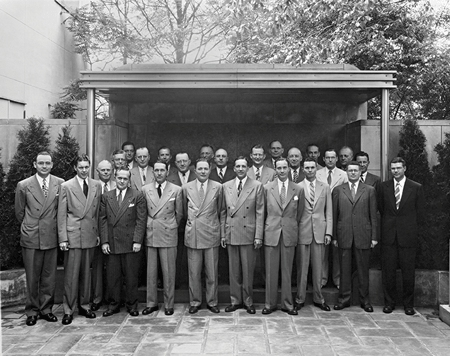
The Whiz Kids in front of the Ford Rotunda, 1946

The Whiz Kids were a group of ten United States Army Air Forces veterans of World War II who became Ford Motor Company executives in 1946.

The group was part of a management science operation within the Army Air Force known as Statistical Control, organized to coordinate all the operational and logistical information required to manage the waging of war. They participated in the broader revolution in logistical and organizational science that World War II fostered. After the war, some of the group discussed opportunities to go into business together.

== Members ==
They were led by their commanding officer, Charles B. "Tex" Thornton. The others were:

- Wilbur Andreson: left after two years to return to California and became an executive with Bekins Van Lines.
- Charles Bosworth: retired as director of purchasing.
- J. Edward Lundy: retired as chief financial officer — he remained at Ford until 1979. He was known as one of the most powerful people in the company, and as a confidant of Henry Ford II.
- Robert McNamara: who eventually became the president of Ford. He then became the United States Secretary of Defense and the President of the World Bank.
- Arjay Miller: rose through finance and became Ford president in the mid 1960s. After being dismissed in favor of Bunkie Knudsen, an executive recruited from General Motors, he became the dean of the Stanford Business School.
- Ben Mills: became general manager of the Lincoln-Mercury Division.
- George Moore: left after two years to become an automobile dealer.
- Francis "Jack" Reith: became head of the ailing Ford of France (Ford SAF) in 1953 and was a rising star after restructuring it and selling it off in 1955 to Simca. Subsequently he was the executive responsible for the Mercury Turnpike Cruiser and heavily involved in the Edsel, both sales failures. Reith left the company to run the Crosley Division of Avco in Cincinnati, Ohio, later renamed AVCO Electronics Division. Reith committed suicide in July 1960. AVCO Electronics was bought out by George Mealey in 1973 and renamed Cincinnati Electronics. In 1981 it was sold to GEC England.
- James Wright: eventually head of Ford division and the car and truck group. Retired in the early 1960s after a power struggle with executive John Dykstra.
- George Agor: a statistician in the Air Force stationed in the Aleutian Islands of Alaska. He was invited and attended the first Whiz Kids meeting that was designated for a time and place. Robert McNamara had arrived a day or so earlier and successfully lobbied to be group leader. George ultimately decided this path was not for him and returned home to Mahopac, NY and later retired as Trust Officer of the State Bank of Albany.

== Origins ==
The group was part of a management science operation within the Army Air Force known as Statistical Control, organized to coordinate all the operational and logistical information required to wage war. Thornton had been recommended to the assistant secretary of War, Robert A. Lovett, by a mutual acquaintance who thought Lovett would find use for the ambitious and energetic Thornton. Upon finding mass confusion, Thornton developed the idea of an information gathering organization within the service, and gained Lovett's support to create the organization, which recruited and trained officer candidates who were selected through intelligence testing. After the war, some of the group discussed opportunities to go into business together.

Thornton wrote to several corporations, offering their services as a group — all ten, or nothing. Henry Ford II had recently taken over the company from his ailing grandfather and, needing management help badly, agreed.

== Starting at Ford ==
The group initially worked together as one organization, the planning department, headed by Thornton. McNamara was Thornton's deputy. Miller focused on reports for senior management, Lundy on financial planning, Mills on facility and program plans, Reith on administrative budgets, and Wright, Moore and Bosworth on administrative issues. Over a few years, they all attracted favorable attention for their work, and some began to move on to other assignments.

The "Whiz Kids" helped the company to implement sophisticated management control systems to govern the company, control costs, and review strategic progress. They instituted modern recruitment and training programs and career planning, aimed to provide Ford Motors with a pool of financial talent.

== After Ford ==
Seven of the ten went on to senior management positions. Thornton left Ford in 1948 due to personality conflicts with executives Ernie Breech and Lewis Crusoe, moving on to Hughes Aircraft, and later was head of Litton Industries. McNamara went on to become the United States Secretary of Defense under President John F. Kennedy, and the team he built there inherited the "Whiz Kids" name and carried on a similar ethos of operations research.

== See also ==
- Whiz Kids (Department of Defense)
