= Henry Ford II World Center =

Office building in Dearborn, Michigan, United States

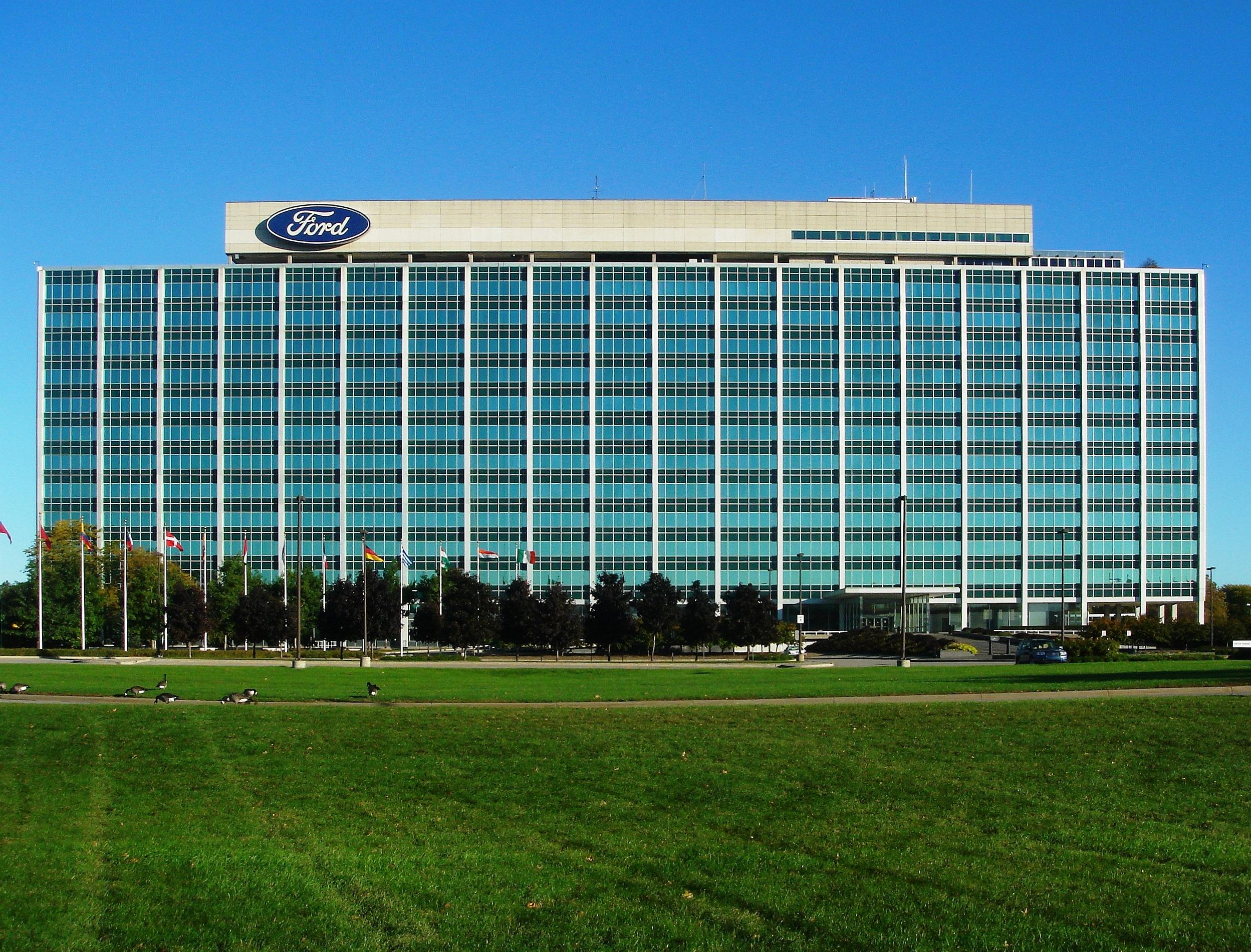
- The headquarters in 2007
- Former names: Central Staff Office Building; Ford Motor Company Administrative Center

General information
- Status: Completed
- Type: Office
- Location: 1 American Road; Dearborn, Michigan 48126; United States
- Coordinates: 42°18′55″N 83°12′37″W
- Construction started: 1953
- Completed: 1956
- Owner: Ford Motor Company

Height
- Roof: 200 ft (61 m)

Technical details
- Floor count: 12 (+ penthouse)
- Floor area: 950,000 sq ft (88,258 m^{2})

Design and construction
- Architect: Skidmore, Owings & Merrill
- Main contractor: Bryant & Detwiler

Website
- corporate.ford.com/dearborn

The Henry Ford II World Center, popularly known as the Glass House, is a 12-story, 200-foot (61 m) office tower in Dearborn, Michigan, United States. Completed in 1956, it is owned by the Ford Motor Company, and served as Ford's global headquarters from its opening until 2025. The facility was designed by Skidmore, Owings, and Merrill in the International style, with a glass facade, penthouse, and 950,000 square feet (88,000 m^{2}) of floor space, supporting a staff of 2,000.

In November 2025, Ford relocated its headquarters to a new facility in Dearborn; the company is currently in the process of moving its employees to the new facility and vacating the Glass House. It is expected to be demolished in 2027.

== Development and history ==
Prior to the Glass House, Ford's central staff occupied a headquarters, the 3000 Schaefer Building, constructed in 1928 at the corner of Schaefer Road and what is now Rotunda Drive in Dearborn. The building was subsequently occupied by the Lincoln Mercury division after completion of the Glass House, later became the Ford Parts Department and was ultimately razed in 1997.

Formally announced in 1950, the new Central Staff Office Building was delayed by construction moratoriums in place during the Korean War. Groundbreaking took place on September 29, 1953, and the building was dedicated on September 26, 1956.

While under design and construction, the building was called the Central Staff Office Building and was later referred to as the New Central Office Building to distinguish it from the company's prior headquarters nearby, known as the Administration Building, which was located at 3000 Schaefer, directly across from the Ford Rotunda building. The building was later referred to as the "Ford Motor Company Administrative Center" and was formally renamed the Henry Ford II World Center in June 1996.

In early 2016, Ford announced a redesign of the headquarters building and its surrounding campus, scheduled to begin in 2021 and projected to connect the Glass House to a series of new and existing buildings, parking decks, soccer fields and an arboretum.

=== Replacement and demolition ===
In September 2025, Ford announced that they would relocate their headquarters to a new building in Dearborn and demolish the Glass House. The new building, located roughly 3 miles west of the Glass House, opened on November 16, 2025, with construction expected to continue until 2027. The new building, designed by Snøhetta, is called The Hub, and adopted the honorific address 1 American Road upon opening. It has 2,100,000 square feet (200,000 m^{2}) of usable space, and is expected to support twice as many employees as the current facility. All employees are expected to vacate the Glass House by mid-2026, after which it is slated to be "sustainably decommissioned" and demolished in 2027.

== Architecture ==
In addition to the prominent 12-story plus penthouse office building, the Glass House includes an adjacent three-story structure accommodating an employee cafeteria, dining rooms and parking garage for 1500 cars—the two elements connected by a 400-foot (120 m) concourse. The headquarters was designed in the International Style by noted architects Gordon Bunshaft and Natalie de Blois, both with the firm Skidmore, Owings & Merrill. De Blois designed the three-story portion of the complex.

Described as a "tall city in a park," the complex was master planned by William L. Pereira and Associates of Los Angeles, requiring multiple entry points to adequately serve the concentrated daily influx of cars. Located on 174 acres (70 ha) (originally 120 acres, 49 ha) previously belonging to Henry Ford's private estate, the grounds have since 1966 also been the site for the Arjay Miller Arboretum, featuring trees and shrubs native to Michigan.

Constructed of reinforced concrete with an estimated five acres (2.0 ha) of tinted, heat-absorbing glass, and standing 200 feet (61 m) tall, the Glass House features central air conditioning, escalators on the first eight floors to augment elevators, movable interior partitions and glass partitions for primary interior corridors. To maximize interior flexibility, structural columns are located outside the exterior curtain wall or within the building's core, providing a clear interior span for office space.

In addition to the tinted, heat-absorbing glass, the facade's curtain wall was designed with 2 1/2-inch-thick (6.4 cm), lightweight sandwich panels composed of five layers: an outermost layer of 16-gauge porcelain enameled steel bonded to a 1/4-inch (0.64 cm) expanded aluminum honeycomb, a sheet of 24–gauge galvanized steel, 2-inch (5.1 cm) of cellular insulation (marketed as Foamglas) and finally an interior 18–gauge steel skin. The building used 6,616 panels in a semi-matte green color and was the largest known use of porcelain enamel composite panels in a single building at the time of its construction, using over 90,000 square feet (8,400 m^{2}) of the material.

The long side of the building's rooftop mechanical penthouse screen walls originally featured the word "FORD" in tall block lettering – later replaced with the company's trademark Blue Oval logo. In 1999, the company replaced the "Blue Oval" at the penthouse screen wall with the words "Ford Motor Company" in the company's original trademark script, referred to by Ford as the "trustmark". Ford returned the "Blue Oval" again to the penthouse screenwalls in 2003, in time for the company's centennial.

=== Reception ===
The Skidmore Owings & Merrill 1956 headquarters building won the Office of the Year Award from Administrative Management Magazine in 1956 and in 1967 an Award of Excellence from the American Institute of Steel Construction.

The columnist George Will said the building opened at "the peak of American confidence" and described the headquarters as having a "sleek glass-and-steel minimalism that characterized up-to-date architecture in the 1950s, when America was at the wheel of the world and even buildings seemed streamlined for speed".

== Artwork and illuminations ==
In 1955, Skidmore Owings & Merrill, architects of the Glass House, commissioned an 18-by-24-foot (5.5 m × 7.3 m) sculpture, a welded metal screen, by artist Thomas Fulton McClure (1920–2009) for its new headquarters, while the building was still under construction—and at the time called the "Central Staff Office Building".

For the 1996 rechristening of the building, Ford commissioned a full-size bronze statue of Henry Ford II by artist Richard R. Miller. The sculpture stands in the building's lobby and depicts Henry Ford II in an informal standing pose. The figure itself is 5 feet 10 inches (1.78 m) tall.

On the evening of September 15, 2008, the office lights at Ford World Headquarters were "strategically" illuminated to spell "Happy 100 GM", in honor of its chief rival General Motors' 100th anniversary.

In 2009, Ford illuminated the facade of the Glass House in pink for two nights, in support of the Susan G. Komen for the Cure cancer awareness program.

== See also ==
- General Motors Technical Center
- Chrysler World Headquarters and Technology Center
- Renaissance Center
- Ford Rotunda
- Greenfield Village
- Fair Lane
- Highland Park Ford Plant
- Ford River Rouge Complex
