= Semon Knudsen =

American automobile executive (1912–1998)

Semon Emil Knudsen
- Born: October 2, 1912; Buffalo, New York, U.S.
- Died: July 6, 1998 (aged 85); Royal Oak, Michigan, U.S.
- Education: Massachusetts Institute of Technology (B.S.)
- Occupations: General Motors (1939–1968); President of the Ford Motor Company (1968–1969); Chairman of White Motor Company (1971–1980)
- Spouse: Frances Anne McConnell
- Father: William S. Knudsen

Semon Emil "Bunkie" Knudsen (October 2, 1912 – July 6, 1998) was an American automobile executive.

== Early life ==
Semon Emil Knudsen was born on October 2, 1912, in Buffalo, New York. He was the son of former General Motors President, and Army three-star general William S. Knudsen. The nickname "Bunkie" is attributed to his relationship with his father and is derived from the World War I term for bunk mate. He was interested in mechanical things, particularly automobiles. When he asked for a car as a teenager, his father gave him one in pieces, which he had to assemble.

After attending Dartmouth College in 1931–1932, Knudsen transferred to the Massachusetts Institute of Technology and graduated in 1936 with a Bachelor of Science in general engineering.

== Career ==
=== General Motors ===
Knudsen began working for General Motors in 1939 with Pontiac Division and rose to management quickly, becoming general manager of the Detroit Diesel Division in 1955, a vice-president of the company and general manager of Pontiac Division in July 1956.

When appointed head of Pontiac, he was given the mission to improve the marque's sales. At that time Pontiac had a reliable but stodgy image. Knudsen brought in Pete Estes from Oldsmobile as chief engineer and hired John DeLorean away from Packard to be his assistant, with the assignment to create high performance versions of Pontiac's existing models. The Pontiac Bonneville (introduced to 1958) and the 1960s "wide-track Pontiacs" came from this effort. Pontiac also became heavily involved in NASCAR racing under Knudsen. Pontiac's new-found performance image eventually led to a dramatic rise in new car sales with the division reaching to third place in industry standings by 1962. In 1961, Knudsen submitted a request to add a new personal-luxury car to his division's lineup to better compete with the Ford Thunderbird, but the car was assigned to Buick, which introduced it as the 1963 Riviera. Knudsen then ordered his division to add sporty and luxurious appointments to the full-sized Catalina hardtop coupe, which became the Grand Prix in 1962.

Knudsen's success at Pontiac led to his promotion to general manager of the Chevrolet Division in 1961. While at Pontiac he was noted for his interest in performance, and this continued with the introduction of the Chevrolet Super Sport models. He also insisted on changes to improve the safety of the Chevrolet Corvair, which was not reported publicly until it was revealed by John DeLorean in his book On a Clear Day You Can See General Motors. Knudsen also reportedly rejected an idea to offer a Pontiac version of the revolutionary Corvair in favor of a front-engine compact car to be offered by Oldsmobile (as the F-85) and Buick (as the Special) for 1961. Pontiac introduced its version of the Buick-Olds-Pontiac compact as the Tempest for 1961, but gave that car some unique engineering features such as a slanted four-cylinder engine (half a Pontiac 389 V8), Corvair-derived rear swing axles and a transaxle (driven by a flexible shaft to eliminate the driveshaft hump for increased interior space).

=== Move to Ford and the larger Mustang ===
Knudsen was elected as executive vice-president of GM in 1967. He was head of GM's Overseas, Industrial, and Defense Operation in February 1968 when he created controversy by resigning to become president of the Ford Motor Company. Rumors at that time suggested Knudsen's move to Ford was prompted by his having been passed over for the GM presidency in favor of Ed Cole, the father of the Chevrolet small block V8 for the Corvette. Henry Ford II was looking for a seasoned executive to take charge at his company, which would allow him to spend more time on outside activities, which opened the door for Knudsen. Certain GM-like styling cues in several Ford products attributable to Knudsen began to appear with the 1970 model year, including the new 'eagle beak' on the Thunderbird (derisively nicknamed the 'Bunkie Beak' by critics for its over-strong similarity to the V-nose grille found on the 1969 Pontiac Grand Prix). Such styling cues were expanded to the completely restyled 1971 full-sized Ford line-up.

Knudsen was also credited (and heavily criticized) for ordering the design of the enlarged 1971 Ford Mustang, moving it further away yet from its pioneering pony car roots, though much of the enlargement was necessary to fit Ford's large 429 cubic-inch Cobra Jet V8 under its hood without the extensive modifications that had been required the 1969–70 Boss 429 Mustang. Compounding this was that by the time the '71 Mustang was introduced in September, 1970, the performance car market had collapsed due to exorbitant insurance premiums and increasingly stringent emission regulations; very few 429-equipped Mustangs were ordered.

=== Firing from Ford ===
Political infighting with career Ford executives, notably Lee Iacocca, led to his dismissal from Ford on September 11, 1969. Reportedly, Henry Ford II sent Ford's vice president for public relations, Ted Mecke, to Knudsen's home the previous night to inform him that he would be fired, telling Knudsen that "Henry sent me here to tell you that tomorrow will be a rough day at work." When Ford made the decision official the next day, Bunkie said "I'm shocked" to which Ford replied, "I imagine you would be." Noted for his laconic replies to difficult questions, Mr. Ford told the media "Things just didn't work out", but later reports indicated many career Ford executives allied themselves with Iacocca and were working against Knudsen. His dismissal led to a widely circulated witticism in Ford circles as the hallmark phrase of Henry Ford, "History is bunk", was turned around to "Bunkie is history".

Following Knudsen's dismissal, the presidency of Ford Motor Company would officially remain vacant for more than a year until Iacocca was promoted to that office on December 10, 1970. Iacocca himself would be dismissed in similar fashion to Knudsen some eight years later.

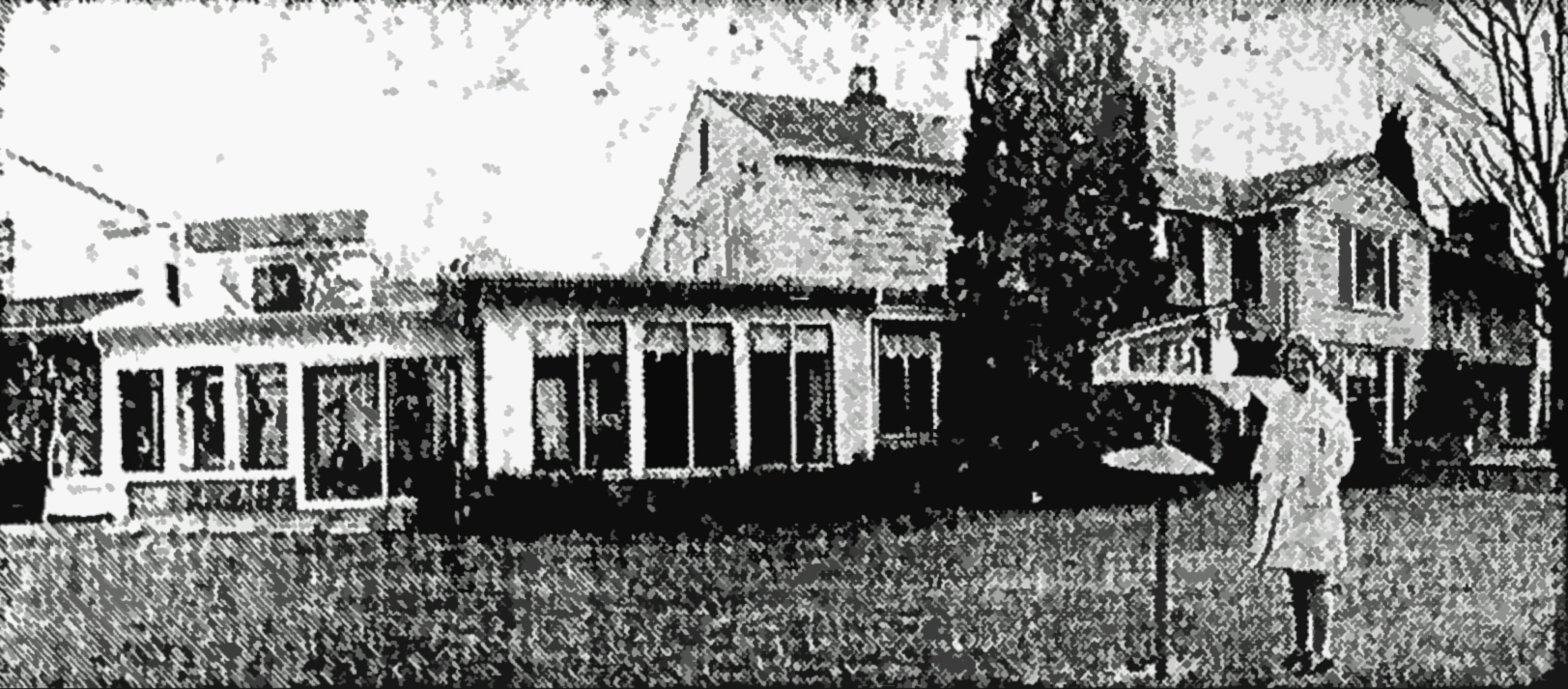
Knudsen's longtime home in Birmingham, Michigan

=== Later career ===
After Ford, Knudsen launched a company to build motor homes called Rectrans Inc.

In 1971, Knudsen became president of truck manufacturer White Motor Company in Cleveland, Ohio, where he worked until he retired in 1980 (White also became defunct that year).

He served as NASCAR National Commissioner from 1978 until his death in 1998.

== Personal life ==
Knudsen was married to Frances Anne McConnell for 58 years until her death in 1996. They had four children: Judith, Lisa, Kristina, and Peter.

== Death ==
Knudsen lived in Bloomfield Hills, Michigan before he died on July 6, 1998, at a nearby hospital in Royal Oak, Michigan.

== Awards and honors ==
- 1974 – Distinguished Service Citation Award, Automotive Hall of Fame

== Sources ==
- "Semon Emil Knudsen." Encyclopedia of American Business History and Biography: The Automobile Industry, 1920–1980. Pages 260–264.
- "Knudsen, Semon E(mil)." Current Biography, 1974: 204–206.
- "Semon Knudsen, 85, Dies; Was Prominent Auto Executive." New York Times. (July 9, 1998. Section A, Page 25, Column 3)
- Article on Knudsen at Pontiac: http://www.pontiacserver.com/mtchiefs1.html.

Business positions
Preceded by Arjay Miller	President of the Ford Motor Company; 1968–1969	Succeeded by Lee Iacocca
