= Ford Rotunda =

Former tourist attraction in the US

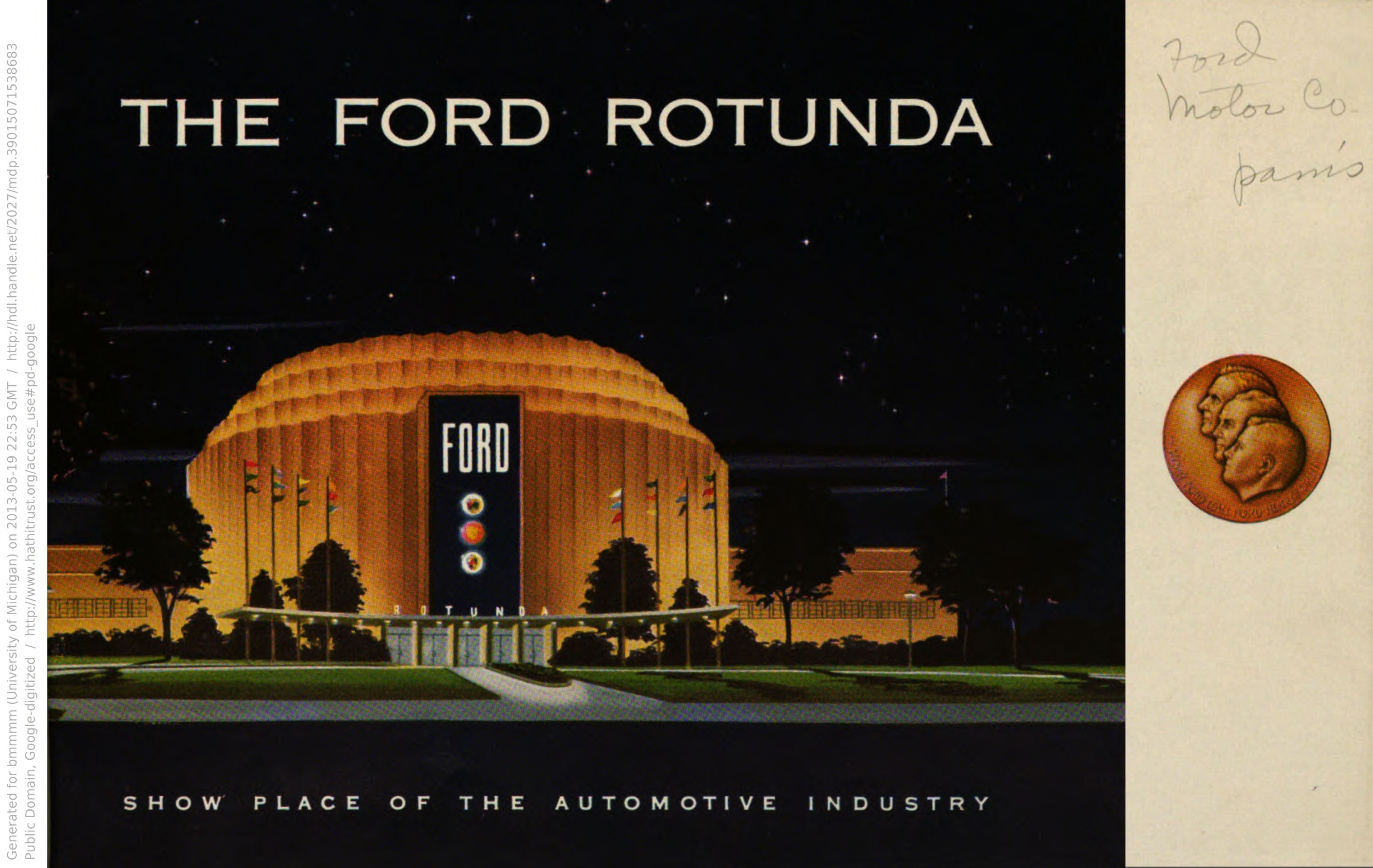

General information
- Status: Destroyed
- Location: Chicago, Illinois (original), Dearborn, Michigan (relocation), United States
- Coordinates: 42°18′43.4″N 83°10′36.1″W
- Inaugurated: 1934
- Destroyed: 1962
- Owner: Ford Motor Company

Design and construction
- Architect: Albert Kahn

The Ford Rotunda was a tourist attraction that was originally on the South Side of Chicago, Illinois, and later was relocated to Dearborn, Michigan. It was among the most popular tourist destinations in the United States, receiving more visits in the 1950s than the Statue of Liberty. It was destroyed by a fire on November 9, 1962.

The Rotunda was built for the 1934 World’s Fair in Chicago. After the World’s Fair, the Rotunda was dismantled and rebuilt in Dearborn, serving as the visitor center for what was then the equivalent of Ford Motor Company’s world headquarters. Albert Kahn, who designed the Rotunda for Ford’s exposition at the World’s Fair, was also called upon to update the design for its new purpose.

== 1933–1934 Chicago World’s Fair ==
The Ford Rotunda (also referred to as the Ford Pavilion, and the Ford Exposition Building) was built by the Ford Motor Company for the Century of Progress International Exposition (the Chicago World's Fair) held in 1933 and 1934 to house installations depicting man’s developments in transportation. The Rotunda was situated within 12 acres (4.9 ha) of the Lake Michigan shoreline on the South Side of Chicago, where Burnham Park is now. Ford did not participate in the 1933 World's Fair. This building was constructed for the 1934 World's Fair.

== Relocating to Dearborn ==
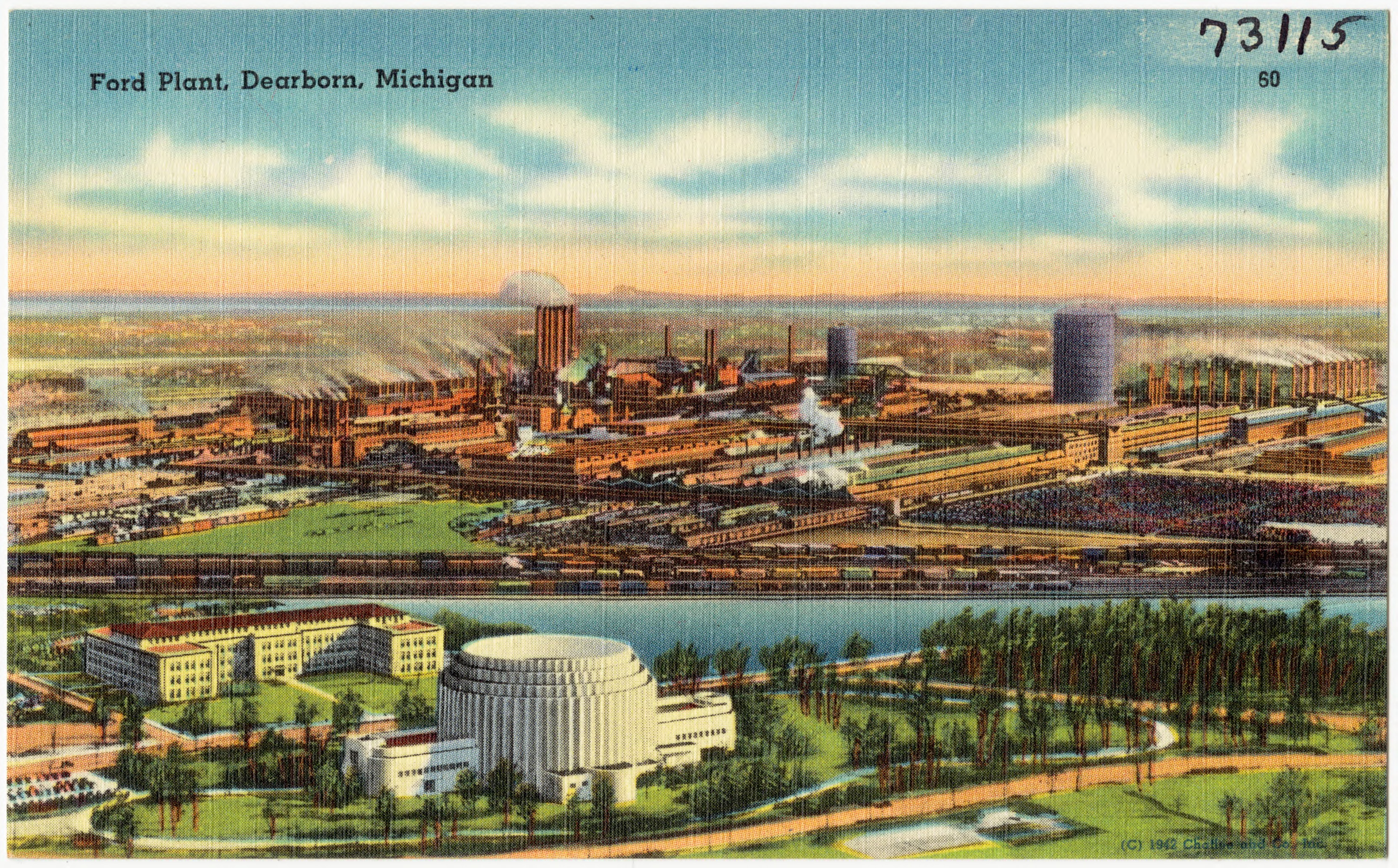
Rotunda in Dearborn, across street from Ford headquarters, over river from the Ford Rouge factory

Late in 1934 it was announced that, following the World’s Fair, the Ford Rotunda would be dismantled and shipped to Dearborn, Michigan where it was to act as a visitor center and be reconstructed using more permanent materials. It was constructed on a 13.5 acres (5.5 ha) site across Schaefer Rd. from the original Ford Administration Building and near the later Ford World Headquarters. It was constructed with a steel framework weighing 1,000 short tons (910 t) with 114,000 sq ft (10,600 m^{2}) of Indiana limestone attached to it, matching the administration building. It stood 10 stories high and measured 210 ft (64 m) at the base and had a center courtyard with a diameter of 92 ft (28 m). Two additional wings were also added to the permanent location in Dearborn that anchored the center section.

The Rotunda had a completely new look after being reassembled at its new location; the building resembled four gears stacked in decreasing sizes. Inside the Rotunda were murals showing the River Rouge assembly line. On the grounds of the Rotunda was a .75 mi (1.21 km) track, including 19 reproductions of what Ford called the Roads of the World, including the Appian Way, the Grand Trunk Road, the Oregon Trail, and Detroit’s Woodward Avenue where visitors would be driven in the latest Ford vehicles. The Rotunda was reopened to the public on May 14, 1936 after more than a year of construction. Fred Waring’s band played for more than 22,000 visitors at the grand opening. Movie stars, celebrities, business leaders, heads of state, and millions of people came to learn about and celebrate the Ford Motor Company.

During World War II, attendance dwindled due to gas rationing so the Rotunda was closed to the public and served as office space and a school for the Army Air Corps, with barracks set up across Rotunda Drive. The theater inside the Rotunda was used as a movie hall to entertain soldiers. In 1946, ten young army officers, soon to be known as the Whiz Kids, first met Henry Ford II over lunch at the Rotunda.

In anticipation of re-opening in 1952, the Rotunda underwent extensive remodeling. Seeking to enclose the open center court with a roof, Ford engineers calculated the weight of a conventional steel-framed dome at 160 short tons (150 t), which the Rotunda structure could not support. In its first real-world application, inventor R. Buckminster Fuller designed a lightweight geodesic dome weighing 18,000 lb (8,200 kg), solving the problem, and becoming a tourist attraction in its own right. On June 16, 1953, the rotunda was reopened to the public as a part of Ford’s 50th Anniversary celebration and as a highlight included 50 huge birthday candles, mounted and lit along the rim of the rotunda.

Ford utilized the Rotunda’s popularity to call attention to new model introductions, and was used as a venue to photograph its automobiles and hold special events. The Rotunda was used for dealer presentations, press events and other business meetings. In the first 12 months of re-opening nearly 1.5 million people visited the Rotunda to see the displays, ride the cars, and tour the Rouge. In 1958 the new Lincoln Continental was introduced to the press under a 100-foot-tall (30 m) model of the Eiffel Tower and in 1959 just after Alaska became the 49th state, a display was built featuring mountains, fisherman and a stuffed grizzly bear in the Rotunda. Flower shows and custom car shows were also held in the Rotunda.

One of the brands introduced at the Rotunda was the ill-fated 1958 Edsel, introduced during the late 1950s, a depressed economic period where buyers wanted smaller, more economical cars. This was the start of the American compact car race and the Edsel division was discontinued shortly after the 1960 models and a production run of two years.

In 1953, the annual Christmas Fantasy was held for the first time at the Rotunda and nearly half a million people visited that year. A 37-foot-tall (11 m) Christmas tree was displayed. An elaborate Santa’s workshop and a life-size nativity scene that the National Council of Churches called the “largest and finest” in the country, as well as animated characters from children’s stories, a 1/24th scale 15,000-piece miniature circus with 800 animals, 30 tents, and 435 toy figurines of circus performers and customers. The Christmas Fantasy was held for nine years at the Rotunda and in that time nearly 6 million people visited. For an essay/memoir about the Christmas Fantasy years, see Amy Kenyon's "Sally Draper at the Ford Rotunda" in Eclectica Magazine, 2016.

The Rotunda was the fifth most popular tourist destination in the 1950s, after Niagara Falls, the Great Smoky Mountains National Park, the Smithsonian Institution and the Lincoln Memorial. It was more popular than Yellowstone Park, Mount Vernon, the Washington Monument and the Statue of Liberty.

== Destruction ==
On Friday, November 9, 1962, shortly after 1 pm, a fire began on the roof of the Rotunda. The fire started as workers were waterproofing the building in preparation for that year’s Winter Spectacular. The alarm rang at 1:12 pm and, despite efforts of the entire Dearborn fire brigade, the walls of the Rotunda collapsed at 1:55 pm. The official report from the Dearborn Fire Department read: "Plastic dome on light aluminum construction over interior court of building collapsed spreading fire to combustible content (Christmas Fantasy display)."

A group of 118 schoolchildren from South Bend, Indiana, had just exited the building and, from the parking lot across the street, witnessed the first flames as they appeared; also present were two truant students from Detroit who were arrested at the scene. Around 60 employees escaped safely, with the only casualty being John Riley, 58, of Dearborn, a building engineer, who suffered a burn on his arm and shoulder and was treated for smoke inhalation.

It was estimated that damages totaled over $15 million (equivalent to nearly $115.5 million in 2013 when adjusted for inflation). Along with the destruction of the Rotunda, the fire consumed each of the 1963 Ford models which were on display, several one-of-a-kind "dream cars," each valued at $100,000 in 1962, and $250,000 worth of Christmas decorations intended for the Winter Spectacular. The Ford Rotunda also housed the Ford Archives, which survived the blazes intact due to a special carbon dioxide (cardox) fire protection system. These archives – then considered the most complete single collection of its kind – consisted of over 14 million items, including business papers, memorabilia, and over 250,000 photographs. A year later, in December 1963, these archives were donated to the Edison Institute (known today as the Henry Ford Museum).

The site of the Ford Rotunda was left empty until the Michigan Technical Education Center (M-TEC) opened on the site in 2000.

The road in front of the Rotunda's former location retains its name, Rotunda Drive.

== Second Ford Rotunda at 1964 New York World's Fair ==
The building itself was a 900-foot-long building with a 12-story glass rotunda at its center, hence the name. The building also contained 65 towering pylons at one end and a large exhibition hall at the other, requiring enough steel to erect a skyscraper 125 feet square and 22 stories high. Since the emphasis was on the automobile, part of the tour of the Rotunda took place in automatically operated Ford-built convertibles riding on a special roadway. The pavilion featured a number of exhibits designed by Walt Disney. This exhibit was seen by over 12 million visitors.

=== Rides ===
- Magic Skyway: Fair-goers, seated in convertibles, were first taken for a ride through plastic tunnels around the outside of the Rotunda for a sweeping view of the grounds, then onto the exhibit building and the fantasy-land within.
- City of Tomorrow: a futuristic city with towering metal spires and the glittering glass of bubble-shaped buildings.
- Hall of Science: highlighted Philco-Ford laboratory research projects, like laser light, sound of stars being picked up with a radio, and a display of new materials Ford would use in later cars.
- Ford World: a 20-foot-diameter, 12-ton, rotating globe highlighting the Ford Motor Company’s operations around the world.
- Drama of Transportation: a collection of chronologically-arranged vehicles–from an Egyptian chariot, to horse-drawn carriages, to the latest automobiles of the day.
