= John H. Rubel =

United States Department of Defense official (1920–2015)

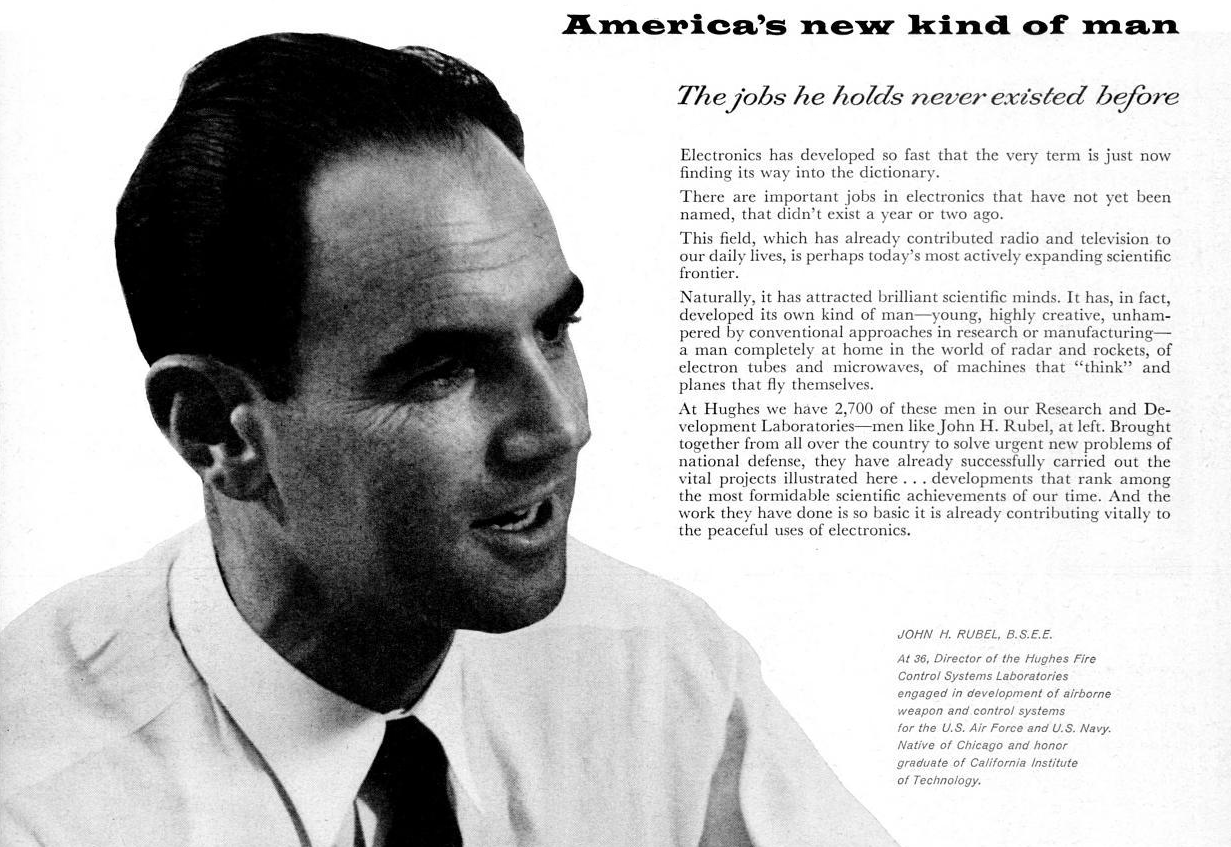
- Rubel, as shown in a Hughes advertisement in Life magazine, October 1956
- Born: April 27, 1920; Chicago, Illinois, U.S.
- Died: January 13, 2015
- Education: California Institute of Technology
- Occupation: Business executive
- Employers: General Electric; Lockheed Corporation; Hughes Electronics; Litton Industries
- Known for: Assistant Secretary of Defense for Research and Engineering; Early development of geosynchronous communications satellites

John H. Rubel (April 27, 1920 – January 13, 2015) was a business executive in the early post-World War II years of the defense electronics industry, later serving as Assistant Secretary of Defense in the Kennedy administration. He is regarded as one of Robert McNamara's so-called Whiz Kids and was an early proponent of geosynchronous communications satellites.

== Early life ==
Rubel was born in Chicago to a well-to-do Jewish family of German origins. Following the death of his father in 1927, he moved with his mother to Los Angeles, where he attended public schools and graduated from Los Angeles High School. His undergraduate degree, in engineering, was from Caltech, in 1942.

== Career ==
As a sole surviving son, his brother, Robert Jack Rubel having been killed in action, Rubel could not enlist in World War II. To contribute to the war effort, Rubel and his wife Dorothy moved to Schenectady, New York, where he was a junior engineer at General Electric. Immediately after the war, he returned to Southern California to work for Lockheed Corporation as an engineer.

In 1948, Rubel joined what was essentially a start up company within Howard Hughes' industrial empire, an organization that eventually became Hughes Electronics, then a new word. By 1956, at the age of 36, he was directing most of the avionics business, and managing 2,000 people. Featured in a Hughes advertisement as "the new man", that is, leader in a field that had not existed only a decade earlier—defense electronics, he began to gain national prominence. Rubel states that Howard Hughes personally did not like the advertising campaign, which was summarily dropped.

In 1959, still during the Eisenhower administration, Rubel was invited to become Assistant Director, to Herbert York, of Defense Research and Engineering in the Pentagon. When, after Kennedy's election, Robert McNamara became Secretary of Defense, Rubel was kept on as Assistant Secretary of Defense for Research and Engineering, one of few outsiders to join the ranks of McNamara's Whiz Kids.

As Assistant Secretary of Defense, Rubel is most remembered for his early sponsorship and support of spin-stabilized geosynchronous communications satellites, notably SYNCOM I and SYNCOM II, leading directly to the government charter of COMSAT Corporation, now a unit of Lockheed Martin Corporation, the founding of the Hughes satellite manufacturing business, now a part of Boeing Corporation, and the creation of today's satellite communications industry. He also sponsored the creation of the Titan III space launch vehicle, which became a workhorse of the space industry.

After leaving the Pentagon in 1963, Rubel worked for 10 years for Litton Industries. He supervised the design of what is regarded as the world's first highly automated modern shipyard, using serial production methods to produce large ships at Pascagoula, Mississippi. This shipyard, now a subsidiary of Huntington Ingalls Corp., is a major private employer on the Gulf coast. Among its first large production contracts the new shipyard produced, were a fleet of five LHAs (Landing Helicopter Assault ships), designed under Rubel's direction, ships with the displacement weight of a small aircraft carrier. A significant majority of U.S. Navy's surface warships have been produced in this shipyard since production began in the early 1970s.

== Other books by Rubel ==
- John H. Rubel (1998) Selected Poems, 1940-1998 (Key Say Publications, Tesuque, NM)
- John H. Rubel (2008) Doomsday Delayed: USAF Strategic Weapons Doctrine and SIOP-62, 1959–1962, Two Cautionary Tales (Hamilton Books, Lanham, MD)
- John H. Rubel (2009) Reflections on Fame and Some Famous Men (Sunstone Press, Santa Fe, NM)
