= J. Edward Lundy =

American businessman

J. Edward Lundy (January 6, 1915 – October 2, 2007) was an American automobile executive who became the chief financial officer of Ford Motor Company.

Lundy was one of the Whiz Kids, a group of 10 young and ambitious veterans of the United States Army Air Forces led by Charles B. "Tex" Thornton. Thornton offered their employment as a group to Henry Ford II, and they were hired in 1946.

He was assigned as financial planning manager, and his influence grew quickly. He was a leader in developing financial forecasting as a business management tool. He was also highly focused on recruiting, and was credited with developing a legion of executives. He reportedly kept records about the people who left Ford, and how well they were doing.

For several years he was deputy to Arjay Miller, a fellow whiz kid who rose to become president of Ford in the mid-1960s. Lundy was successively assistant controller and controller. He became chief financial officer in 1967 and remained in the position until he retired in 1979. He remained a member of the board of directors, reportedly at Henry Ford II's request, until 1985.

Some in Ford Motor Company's finance staff still use the term Lundyism to refer to grammatical, typographical, and formatting conventions in the preparation of financial reports.

== Links and Reference ==
- Automotive Hall of Fame Bio
- Detroit News "Whiz Kids" article
- The Whiz Kids; John A. Byrne; Doubleday, N.Y., 1993
