= Arjay Miller =

American businessman

- Born: Rawley John Miller Jr. March 4, 1916; Shelby, Nebraska, U.S.
- Died: November 3, 2017 (aged 101); Woodside, California, U.S.
- Education: University of California, Los Angeles (BS); University of California, Berkeley
- Occupations: President of the Ford Motor Company (1963–1968); Dean of the Stanford Graduate School of Business (1969–1979)
- Spouse: Frances Fearing (m. 1940; died 2010)
- Children: 2
- Awards: Automotive Hall of Fame

Arjay Miller (March 4, 1916 – November 3, 2017) was one of the ten Whiz Kids hired by Henry Ford II of the Ford Motor Company. He served as president of Ford Motor Company between 1963 and 1968, until he was abruptly fired by Henry Ford II. He then went on to become the dean of the Stanford Graduate School of Business.

== Early life ==
Rawley John Miller Jr. was born on March 4, 1916, to Rawley John Miller and Mary Gertrude Miller in Shelby, Nebraska. The youngest of eight children, he adopted the name Arjay from his sister, who nicknamed him after the first and second initials of his father, Rawley John. At the age of 16, he moved to California. He graduated from University of California, Los Angeles (UCLA) with a Bachelor of Science degree in banking and finance in 1937. After UCLA, he enrolled as a graduate student at University of California, Berkeley in an economics program, but did not complete a dissertation.

== Personal life ==
Miller met Frances Fearing while attending UCLA and they got married in 1940. They remained married for 70 years until her death in 2010. They had two children, Kenneth and Ann.

== Career ==
He worked as an economist with the Federal Reserve Bank of San Francisco. He attempted to enlist in the U.S. military for World War II and was rejected due to poor eyesight. He was later drafted to the U.S. Army Air Forces where he taught pilots on a flight simulator. He enrolled in a statistical program for officers at Harvard University, and joined the Army Air Forces's Office of Statistical Control, where he worked with others to track the logistics of air operations and training for the remainder of the war.

At the rank of captain, Miller along with nine others from the Office of Statistical Control, famously called the Whiz Kids, sought opportunities to get hired on as a "package deal" to bring their logistics expertise to the public sector. The group made an agreement with Henry Ford II, and were hired on to the Ford Motor Company. Miller was hired in 1945 as part of the Ford finance department's analysis unit. By January 1961, Miller was promoted to Vice President for Finance. He was named President of Ford Motor Company in May 1963, succeeding John Dykstra. Along with fellow Whiz Kid, Robert S. McNamara, Miller is remembered as helping Ford to add safety options to their automobiles in the mid-1950s.

During his time as President, Ford unveiled the Mustang, and responded to the need for more automotive safety features after Ralph Nader's 1965 book on the automotive industry's design flaws, Unsafe at Any Speed. After the Detroit race riots of 1967, Miller formed the Economic Development Corporation of Greater Detroit in 1968, and served as the chairman until June 1969. In 1968, Henry Ford II abruptly named Semon Knudsen as President and moved Miller to vice chairman, a role created for him. In 1969, he left Ford's management team, though he stayed on Ford's board until 1986.

In July 1969, Miller replaced Ernie Arbuckle as dean of the Stanford Graduate School of Business. He remained as dean for 10 years, until retiring from the post in 1979. While dean, he is credited with establishing Stanford's Public Management Program in 1971.

Miller co-founded the Public Policy Institute of California with Bill Hewlett and Roger Heyns in 1994, served as the chair of the board of directors from 1995 to 1998, and remained a member of the board until 2006. He was the founding chairman of the board and a life trustee of the Urban Institute. He was named an honorary trustee of the Brookings Institution, and a board member of the Mellon Foundation, the William and Flora Hewlett Foundation, and SRI International. He served on the boards of a number of companies, including Wells Fargo, The Washington Post, Levi Strauss & Co., Utah International (mining company), and Burlington Northern Railroad.

== Death ==
Miller died on November 3, 2017, in Woodside, California, at the age of 101.

== Awards and honors ==
- Automotive Hall of Fame, 2006 inductee

== Legacy ==
- Arjay Miller Scholars, an award at Stanford Graduate School of Business for the academically highest 10 percent of a graduating class
- Frances and Arjay Miller Prize in Social Innovation, a fellowship award given to students at Stanford Graduate School of Business
- Arjay and Frances Fearing Miller Chair in Public Policy, endowed chair at the Public Policy Institute of California
- Arjay and Frances Miller Chair in Federal Economic Policy, endowed chair at the Brookings Institution
- Arjay Miller Michigan Arboretum, an attraction at the Ford World Headquarters

Business positions
Preceded by John Dykstra	President of the Ford Motor Company; 1963–1968	Succeeded by Semon Knudsen
