= Merton J. Peck =

American economist (1925–2013)

Merton J. Peck (December 17, 1925 – March 1, 2013) was an American economist.

Peck was born in Cleveland, Ohio. During World War II, he served in the United States Army Signal Corps. After the war, he graduated from Oberlin College with a bachelor's degree and a masters and doctorate from Harvard University. His doctoral advisor was Edward S. Mason.

After earning his doctorate, he taught at the University of Michigan, Harvard, and finally Yale University in 1963, where he stayed until 2003. During this time, he served on the Council of Economic Advisers from 1968 to 1969. He was also a Whiz Kid under Robert McNamara.

In 2013, he died in Florida.
