= Henry Ford II =

American businessman (1917–1987)

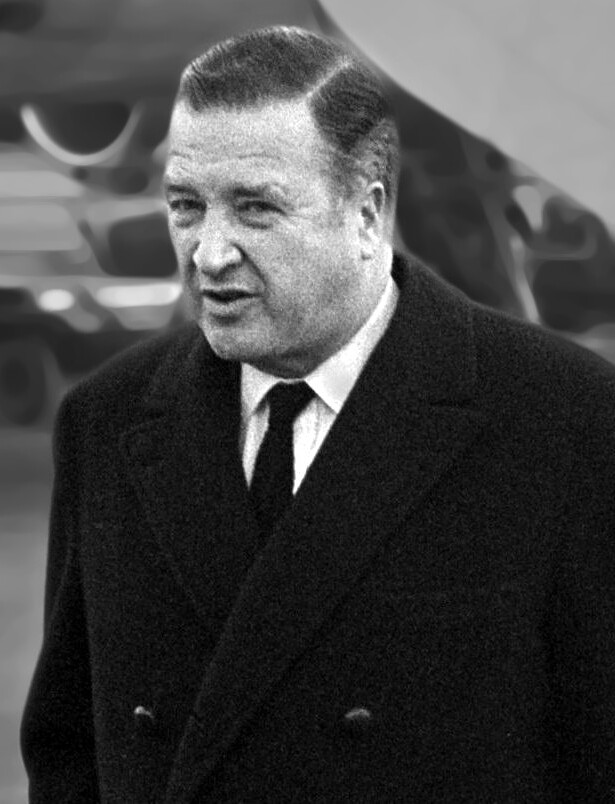
- Ford in 1963
- Born: Henry Ford II; September 4, 1917; Detroit, Michigan, U.S.
- Died: September 29, 1987 (aged 70); Detroit, Michigan, U.S.
- Other name: Hank the Deuce
- Education: Yale University (did not graduate)
- Occupation: Automobile executive
- Employer: Ford Motor Company (1943–1982)
- Title: President of Ford Motor Company (1945–1960); CEO of Ford Motor Company (1945–1979); Chairman of Ford Motor Company (1960–1980)
- Spouses: Anne McDonnell (m. 1940; div. 1964); Maria Cristina Vettore (m. 1965; div. 1976); Kathleen Roberta King (m. 1980)
- Children: 3, including Edsel II
- Parents: Edsel Bryant Ford (father); Eleanor Lowthian Clay (mother)
- Relatives: William Clay Ford Sr. (brother); Sheila Ford Hamp (niece); Henry Ford I (grandfather)
- Family: Ford

Henry Ford II (September 4, 1917 – September 29, 1987), commonly known as "Hank the Deuce," was an American businessman in the automotive industry. He was the oldest son of Edsel Ford and oldest grandson of Henry Ford I.

He served as president of the Ford Motor Company from 1945 to 1960, chief executive officer (CEO) from 1947 to 1979, and chairman of the board of directors from 1960 to 1980. Under his leadership, Ford Motor Company became a publicly traded corporation in 1956. From 1943 to 1950, he also served as president of the Ford Foundation.

== Early life ==
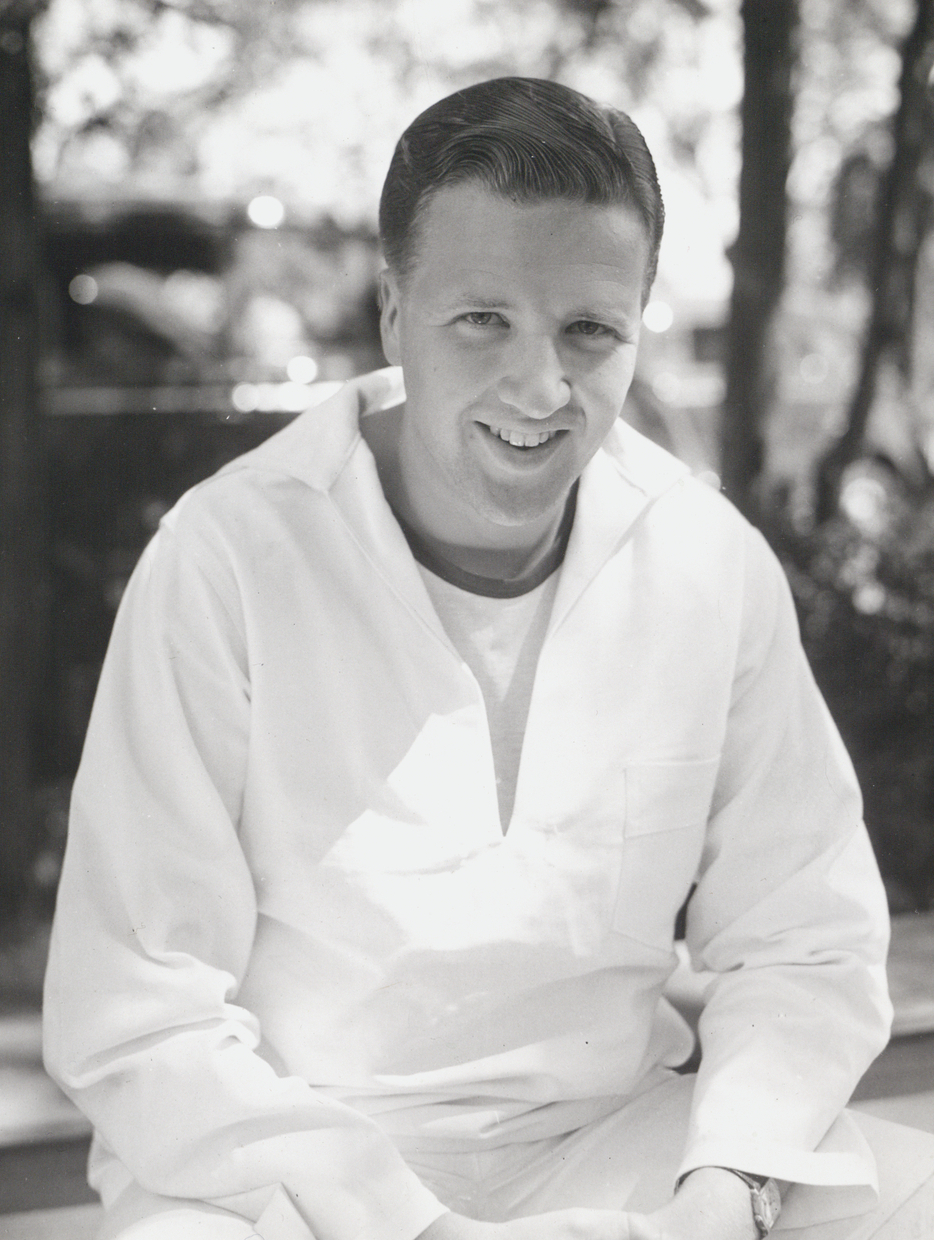
Henry Ford II in 1940

Henry Ford II was born in Detroit, Michigan, to Eleanor Clay Ford and Edsel Ford on September 4, 1917. He, along with his brothers Benson and William, and sister Josephine, grew up amid affluence. He graduated from The Hotchkiss School in 1936. He attended Yale University, where he served on the business staff of The Yale Record, the campus humor magazine, but left in 1940 before graduation. During this time, he became a member of the Zeta Psi fraternity.

His niece, Sheila Ford Hamp, William's daughter, is the current owner of the National Football League's Detroit Lions. His brother was principal owner from 1963 until his death in 2014. William's widow, Martha Firestone Ford, assumed control of the franchise until passing it to Sheila in 2020.

== Career ==
When his father Edsel, president of Ford, died of cancer in May 1943 (during World War II), Henry Ford II was serving in the US Navy and unable immediately to inherit the presidency of the family-owned business. The elderly and ailing Henry Ford I, company founder, decided to re-assume the presidency, though mentally inconsistent, suspicious, and considered no longer fit for the presidency position by most of the company's directors. For the previous 20 years, although he had long been without any official executive title, the elder Ford had maintained de facto control over the company; the board and the management had never seriously defied him, and this moment was not different. The directors elected him, and he served until the end of the war. During this period, the company began to decline, losing over $10 million a month (equivalent to $230,000,000 in 2025). The administration of President Franklin D. Roosevelt considered a government acquisition of the company to ensure continued war production, but the idea never progressed to execution.

Henry Ford II left the Navy in July 1943 and joined the company's management a few weeks later. He assumed presidency of the business on September 21, 1945. Since it had been assumed that Edsel Ford would continue in his capacity as president of the company for much longer than turned out to be the case, Henry Ford II had by then received little preparation for the position. He inherited the company during a chaotic period; its European factories had suffered a great deal of damage during the war, the company was losing money, and domestic sales were in decline.

Henry Ford II immediately adopted an aggressive management style. One of his first acts as company president was to place John Bugas in charge of company management, dismissing much of his grandfather's inner circle, especially Harry Bennett, chief of the Ford Service Department, whom the elder Ford had hired in 1921 to oversee security at the vast Ford Rouge Plant complex, and nearly two decades later had become a lightning rod in efforts to prevent unionization of the Ford labor force, by violent means if necessary. Next, acknowledging his inexperience, Henry II hired several seasoned executives to support him. He hired former General Motors executives Ernest Breech and Lewis Crusoe away from the Bendix Corporation. Breech was to serve in the coming years as the young Ford's business mentor, and the Breech–Crusoe team would form the core of Ford's business expertise, offering much-needed experience.

Additionally, Ford hired ten young up-and-comers, known as the "Whiz Kids". These ten, gleaned from an Army Air Forces statistical team, Ford envisioned as giving the company the ability to innovate and stay current. Two of them, Arjay Miller and Robert McNamara, went on to serve as presidents of Ford themselves. A third member, J. Edward Lundy, served in key financial roles for several decades and helped to establish Ford Finance's position as a major worldwide financial operation. As a team, the "Whiz Kids" are probably best remembered as the design team for the 1949 Ford, which they took from concept to production in 19 months, and which re-established Ford as a formidable automotive company. It was reported that 100,000 orders for this car were taken the day it was introduced to the market.

Ford became president and CEO of Ford Motor Company in 1945. In 1956, the company became a publicly traded corporation and dedicated its new world headquarters building. During his term as CEO of Ford, he lived in Grosse Pointe, Michigan. On July 13, 1960, he was elected chairman before resigning as president on November 9, 1960. He would resign as CEO on October 1, 1979, and as chairman on March 13, 1980. His nephew, William Clay Ford Jr. would later assume these positions after 20 years of non-Ford family management of the company. During this interim, the family's interests were represented on the board by Henry's younger brother William Clay Ford Sr., as well as Henry's son Edsel Ford II and his nephew William Clay Ford Jr.

During the early 1960s Ford engaged in lengthy negotiations with Enzo Ferrari to buy Ferrari, with a view to expanding Ford's presence in motorsport in general and at the Le Mans 24 Hours in particular. However, negotiations collapsed due to disputes over control of Ferrari's Scuderia Ferrari racing division. The collapse of the deal led him to launch the Ford GT40 project, intended to end Ferrari's dominance at Le Mans (the Italian marque won the race six consecutive times from 1960 to 1965). In 1966, after two difficult years in 1964 and 1965, the GT40 Mark IIs had top 3 finishes at both the Daytona 24 Hours and the Sebring 12 Hours before taking the first of four consecutive wins at Le Mans.

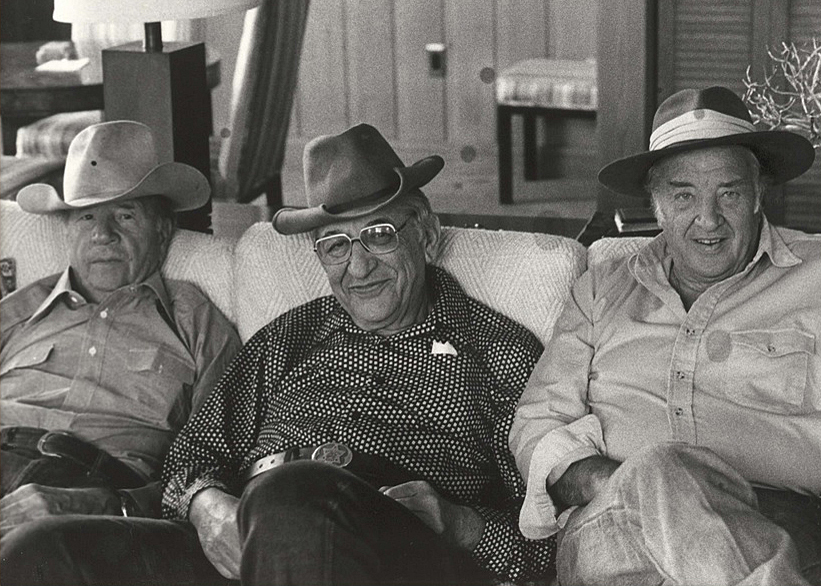
Henry Ford II (right) with Max Fisher (center) and John Bugas at the latter's Wyoming ranch

In the late 1960s, Ford became personally involved in the development of the Lincoln Continental Mark III. He gave his enthusiastic approval for both the final exterior and interior designs. The result was a Ford Motor Company flagship that single-handedly made Lincoln profitable and spawned a three-decade market rivalry between the Lincoln Mark series and Cadillac's Eldorado series. During this time, Ford also reformed the company's European operations, merging the previously separate (and competing) British and German subsidiaries into a single Ford of Europe with a common product line and merged manufacturing operations. During the 1970s, Ford of Europe expanded substantially, with new factories in Saarlouis and Valencia, the latter becoming one of Ford's biggest plants outside the US.

In 1973–74, as it became clear that the U.S. automobile market would begin to favor smaller, more fuel-efficient cars, Ford's then-President Lee Iacocca was highly interested in buying powertrains from Honda Motor Company as a way to minimize the cost of developing a small Ford car for the North American market, such as a modified version of Ford of Europe's Ford Fiesta. The plan was rejected by Henry Ford II, who said, "No car with my name on the hood is going to have a Jap engine inside." Although the Ford Motor Company had been selling a Mazda compact pickup truck as the Ford Courier since late 1971, Ford did not like the idea of flagship North American passenger car models moving in that direction. Ford Motor Company did go on to adapt to the era in which Japanese, German, and American participation in a globalized automobile industry became tightly integrated. For example, Ford's relationship with Mazda was well developed even before the end of Henry Ford II's period of influence. However, in Iacocca's view, it lagged several years behind GM and Chrysler, due to Henry Ford II's unappealable influence, before others led it forward despite his resistance.

Henry Ford II's management style caused the company's fortunes to fluctuate in more ways than one. For example, he allowed the offering of public stock in 1956, the IPO raising $650 million for the company (equivalent to $7.7×10^{9} in 2025); but the "experimental car" program instituted during his tenure, the "Edsel", cost the company almost half that. Likewise, Henry Ford II hired in 1964 the creative Lee Iacocca, who was fundamental to the success of the Ford Mustang, but fired him due to personal disputes in 1978. (On the break in their relationship, Iacocca quoted Ford as saying, "Sometimes you just don't like somebody." Iacocca later retorted, "If a guy is over 25 percent a jerk, he's in trouble. And Henry was 95 percent.")

Henry Ford II formally retired from all positions at Ford Motor Company on October 1, 1982, upon reaching the company's mandatory retirement age of 65, but remained the ultimate source of authority at Ford until his death in 1987.

== Awards and achievements ==
- 1969, awarded the Presidential Medal of Freedom from President Lyndon B. Johnson
- 1983, inducted into the Automotive Hall of Fame

== Personal life ==
Henry Ford II was married three times:

- Anne McDonnell (1919–1996), a daughter of James Francis McDonnell. They married in 1940 and divorced in 1964. The Fords had three children including Edsel Ford II
- Maria Cristina Vettore (1929–2008), formerly wife of Robin Willoughby Merivale Austin, a Canadian in the British Royal Navy; she and Ford married in New York City in 1965 and divorced in 1976.
- Kathleen DuRoss (born Kathleen Roberta King, 1940 – 2020), she and Ford were married in Carson City, Nevada, in 1980. By this marriage, Ford had two stepdaughters.

Ford died of pneumonia in Detroit at Henry Ford Hospital on September 29, 1987, at age 70. After a private funeral service at Christ Church Grosse Pointe, his remains were cremated and the ashes scattered.

== Legacy ==
- The Henry Ford II World Center, the official title of the Ford World Headquarters in Dearborn, Michigan
- The Henry Ford II Honors Program, the official honors program of Henry Ford College
- Henry Ford II High School, in Sterling Heights, Michigan, is named for him

== Filmography ==
- The Ford 50th Anniversary Show (1953) – Broadcast live on CBS and NBC and called both "a landmark in television" and "a milestone in the cultural life of the '50s".
- Thunderball (1965) – Extra at the Nassau Casino (uncredited)

== In popular culture ==
Henry Ford II is portrayed by Tracy Letts in the 2019 film Ford v Ferrari (released under the title "Le Mans '66" in some parts of Europe).

He appears in a few scenes in the 2002 movie Monday Night Mayhem. Footage of him appears in the documentary television series The Cars that Built America.

== See also ==
- Ford family (Michigan)
- Ford Foundation

== Notes ==
Business positions
Preceded by Charles E. Sorensen	Executive Vice-President of Ford Motor Company; April 10, 1944 – July 1, 1946	Succeeded by Ernest R. Breech
Preceded by Henry Ford	President of the Ford Motor Company; September 21, 1945 – November 9, 1960	Succeeded by Robert McNamara
Preceded by Henry Ford	CEO of the Ford Motor Company; September 21, 1945 – October 1, 1979	Succeeded by Philip Caldwell
Preceded by Ernest R. Breech	Chairman of the Ford Motor Company; July 13, 1960 – March 13, 1980	Succeeded by Philip Caldwell
