= Defense strategy =

Defense strategy may refer to:

- Military strategy
- Defense (legal)
