= Ford World Headquarters =

Office building in Dearborn, Michigan, United States

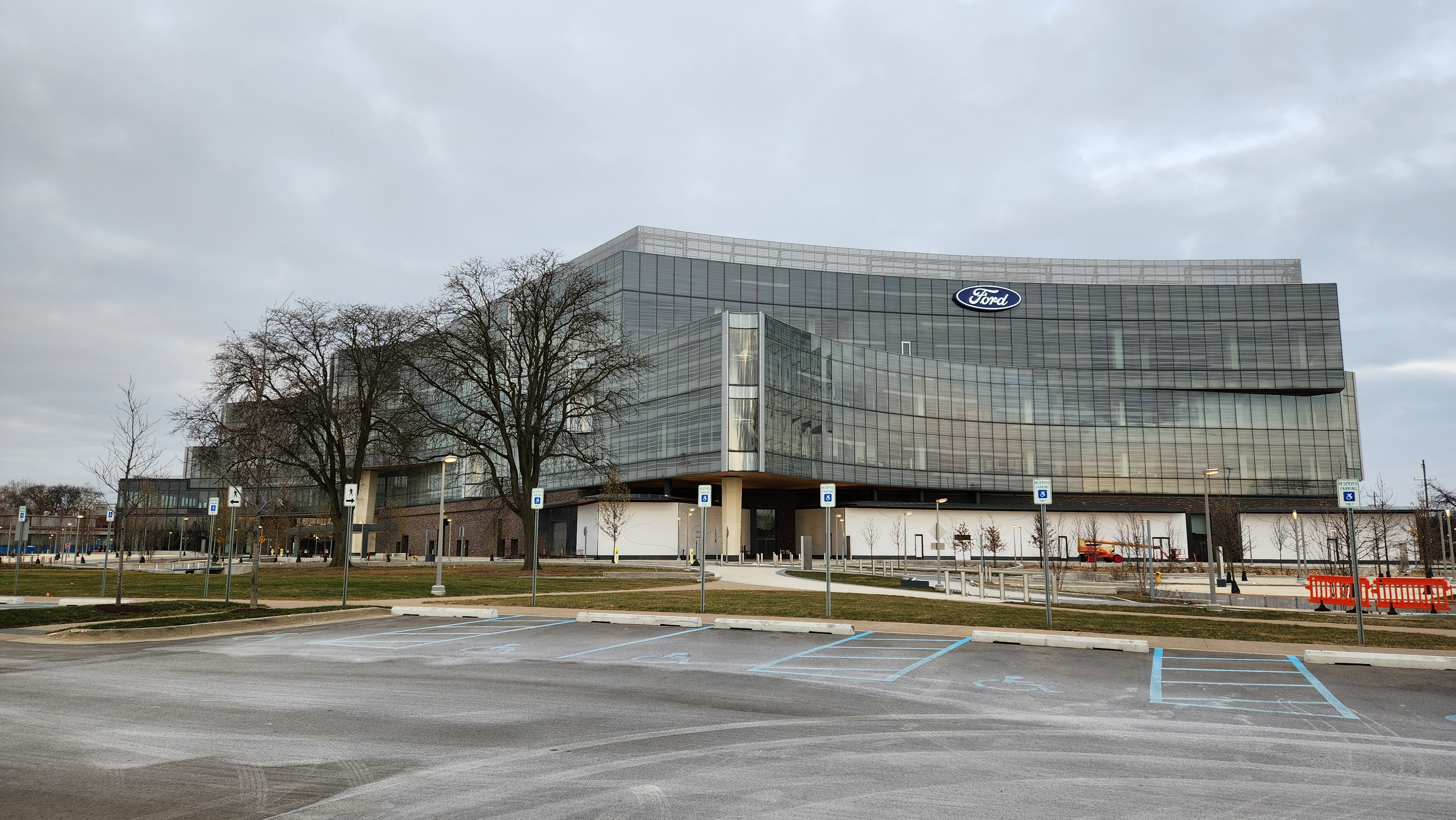
- Exterior in 2025
- Alternative names: Central Campus Office Building; The Hub

General information
- Status: Completed
- Type: Office building
- Location: 2100 Carroll Shelby Way; Dearborn, Michigan 48124; United States
- Coordinates: 42°18′00.2″N 83°14′09.8″W
- Construction started: December 2020
- Estimated completion: 2027
- Owner: Ford Motor Company

Technical details
- Floor count: 4
- Floor area: 2,100,000 sq ft (195,096 m^{2})
- Lifts/elevators: 36

Design and construction
- Architect: Snøhetta
- Main contractor: Barton Malow

Website
- corporate.ford.com/dearborn

The Ford World Headquarters (alternatively known as the Central Campus Building and the Hub) is an under-construction office building in Dearborn, Michigan, United States. It has served as the global headquarters of the Ford Motor Company since 2025, though construction on portions of the building will continue through 2027. Designed by Snøhetta, the four-story building includes 2,100,000 square feet (200,000 m^{2}) of floor space, containing Ford's administrative offices, as well as product development facilities.

== History ==
From 1956 to 2025, Ford's headquarters were located in a 12-story office tower near the interchange of Michigan Avenue and M-39 in Dearborn, known since 1996 as the Henry Ford II World Center, and commonly called the Glass House. Prior to the Glass House, Ford's central staff were based in the 3000 Schaefer Building, constructed in 1928 at the corner of Schaefer Road and what is now Rotunda Drive in Dearborn. The building was subsequently occupied by the Lincoln Mercury division after completion of the Glass House, later became the Ford Parts Department and was ultimately razed in 1997.

In 2016, Ford announced a wide-ranging redevelopment of its Research and Engineering Campus in Dearborn, and hired SmithGroupJJR to develop plans for the project. The 10-year project would have consolidated the roughly 30,000 Ford employees across 70 buildings in Dearborn into the Research and Engineering Campus and the Henry Ford II World Center, with expansions and renovations also planned for the latter. Updated plans, developed by Snøhetta and released by then-CEO Jim Hackett in 2019, included the Hub, then planned as a figure-eight-shaped building.

The site of the Hub, across Oakwood Boulevard from The Henry Ford, was previously occupied by Ford's Product Development Center (PDC). The PDC, completed in 1955, was demolished in December 2020 to make way for the new facility. Groundbreaking occurred that month on the new building, which was then only reported to be a larger research and development facility; it was not until September 2025 that Ford announced that the building would replace the Glass House as its global headquarters.

The new facility was dedicated as the Ford World Headquarters on November 16, 2025, in a public grand opening ceremony with tours of the interior. On opening, it adopted the honorific address 1 American Road, which was previously the address of the Glass House. All employees from the Glass House are expected to move into the new building by mid-2026, though construction will continue on portions of the new building through 2027.

== Architecture ==
The Hub anchors an ongoing redevelopment of Ford's Research and Engineering Campus, master-planned by Snøhetta. The relocation of Ford's administrative headquarters to the campus was intended to consolidate Ford's workforce and bring senior management closer to product development facilities, allowing for increased collaboration and interaction between employees in different departments. Ford reports that 14,000 employees will work within a 15-minute walk of the Hub when the project is completed.

The contemporary building was constructed primarily from concrete and steel, with a large glass façade. It contains a total of 2,100,000 square feet (200,000 m^{2}) of floor space, capable of supporting 4,000 employees. It contains 34 passenger elevators and two freight elevators.

== See also ==
- General Motors Technical Center
- Chrysler World Headquarters and Technology Center
- Renaissance Center
- Ford Rotunda
- The Henry Ford
- Ford River Rouge Complex
