= COOKFOX Architects =

Architecture firm based in New York City

Coordinates: 40.740688°N 73.994726°W

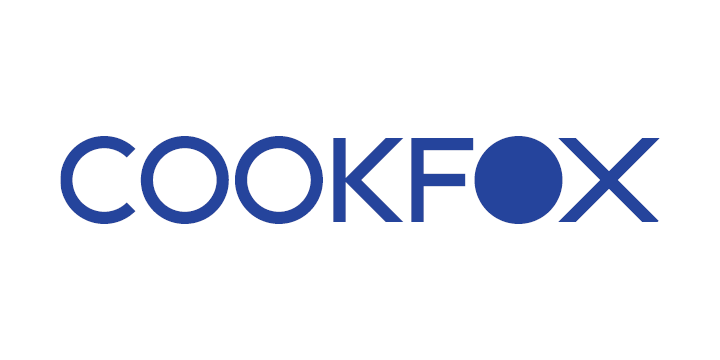
- Formerly: Cook+Fox Architects
- Type: Private
- Industry: Architecture, Design, Interior Design
- Founder: Rick Cook, Bob Fox
- Headquarters: New York, New York
- Website: https://cookfox.com/

COOKFOX Architects (formerly Cook+Fox Architects) is an American architecture firm based in New York City founded in 2003 by architects Rick Cook and Bob Fox. The firm is known for environmentally responsive architecture, biophilic design, adaptive reuse projects, and high-performance commercial buildings. COOKFOX gained international recognition for the design of the Bank of America Tower at One Bryant Park, one of the first commercial skyscrapers in the United States to receive LEED Platinum certification.

The practice has designed projects including Terminal Warehouse, St. John's Terminal, 25 Park Row, and the redevelopment of the Stephen Sondheim Theatre. The firm’s work frequently incorporates landscape integration, daylighting, energy efficiency, and occupant wellness strategies.

== History ==
Rick Cook established Richard Cook & Associates in the early 1990s, developing projects focused on contextual urban architecture and historic districts in New York City.

In 2003, Cook partnered with Bob Fox, formerly of FXFOWLE Architects, to form Cook+Fox Architects, later renamed COOKFOX Architects. The firm emerged during a period of growing interest in sustainable urban architecture in New York City and became associated with environmentally responsive commercial development.

The firm gained widespread attention through its work on the Bank of America Tower at One Bryant Park, completed in 2009 for the Durst Organization. The skyscraper was among the earliest large-scale office towers to pursue advanced sustainability strategies including underfloor air distribution, water conservation systems, and high-performance façade design.

During the 2010s and 2020s, COOKFOX expanded its portfolio to include large adaptive reuse developments and mixed-use residential projects throughout New York City. These included the redevelopment of Terminal Warehouse in West Chelsea and St. John’s Terminal in Hudson Square.

== Design Philosophy ==
COOKFOX’s work is frequently associated with biophilic design principles and environmentally responsive architecture. Architectural critics and publications have noted the firm’s emphasis on integrating vegetation, daylight, outdoor space, and natural materials into dense urban environments.

The firm’s projects often incorporate terraces, green roofs, operable façades, stormwater management systems, and landscaped communal spaces intended to strengthen occupants’ connection to nature.

Architectural Record described the redevelopment of Terminal Warehouse as combining historic preservation with contemporary workplace design and sustainability strategies.

== Selected Projects ==
=== Bank of America Tower (One Bryant Park) ===
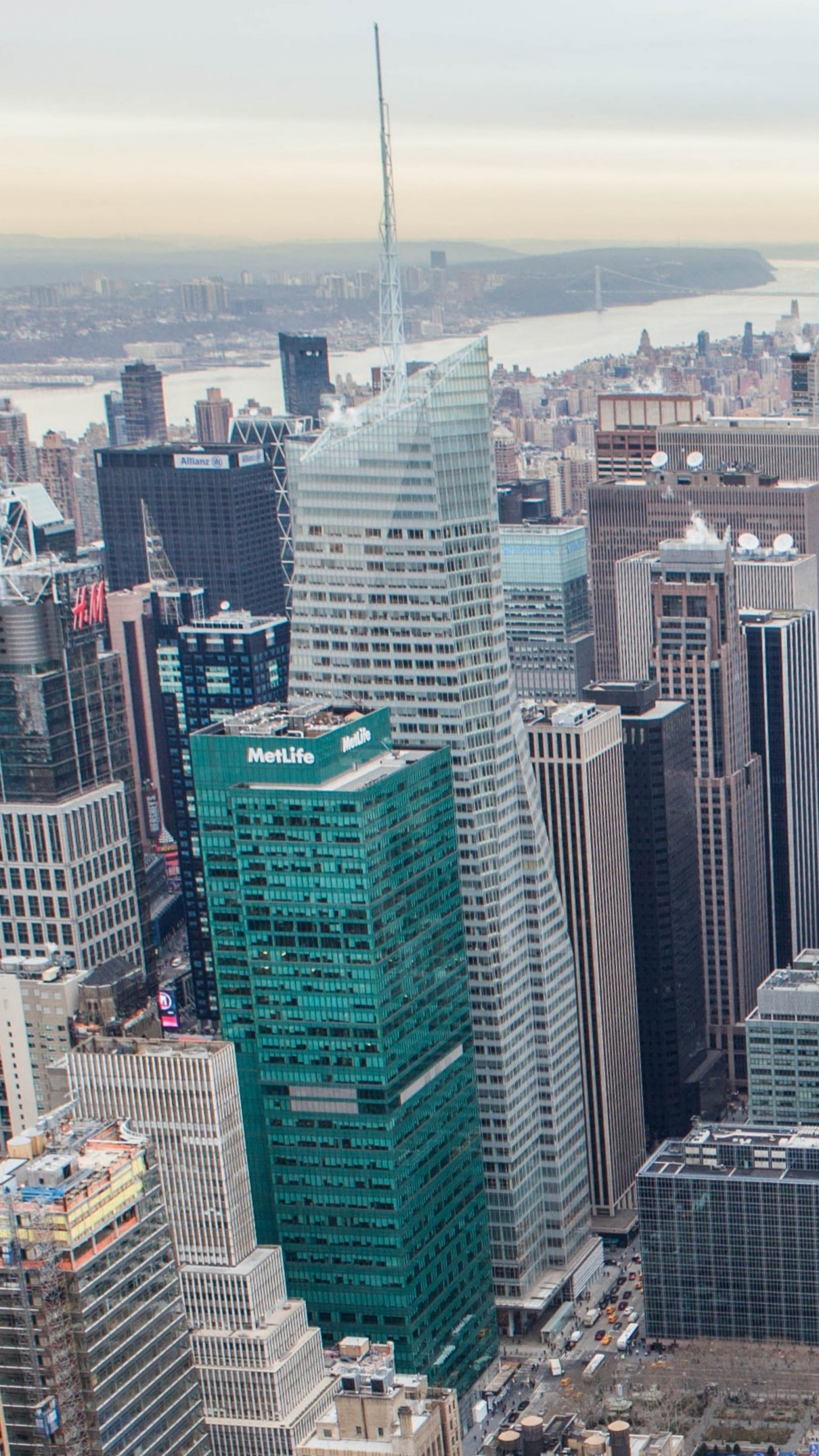
One Bryant Park.

Completed in 2009, the Bank of America Tower at One Bryant Park in Midtown Manhattan was designed by COOKFOX in collaboration with Adamson Associates Architects. The 55-story tower became one of the first commercial high-rise office buildings to achieve LEED Platinum certification.

The project incorporated advanced environmental systems including rainwater harvesting, high-efficiency glazing, daylight optimization, and underfloor air distribution.

=== St. John’s Terminal ===
COOKFOX designed the redevelopment of St. John’s Terminal in Hudson Square, adapting the former rail terminal into a large office complex later occupied by Google.

The project involved the preservation and expansion of the 1930s structure, incorporating landscaped terraces, public open space, and extensive adaptive reuse strategies intended to reduce embodied carbon emissions.

=== Bruce Springsteen Center for American Music ===
The Bruce Springsteen Center for American Music (BSCAM) is a 32,000-square-foot museum, archive, research center, and performance venue at Monmouth University in Long Branch, New Jersey. Designed by COOKFOX Architects and opened in 2026, the mass-timber building features a weathering-steel façade inspired by the state’s industrial heritage, exhibition galleries devoted to Springsteen and the broader history of American music, and a 240-seat auditorium. The project received coverage in The New York Times, The Philadelphia Inquirer, Wallpaper*, Fast Company, The Architect’s Newspaper, Metropolis, and The New Republic.

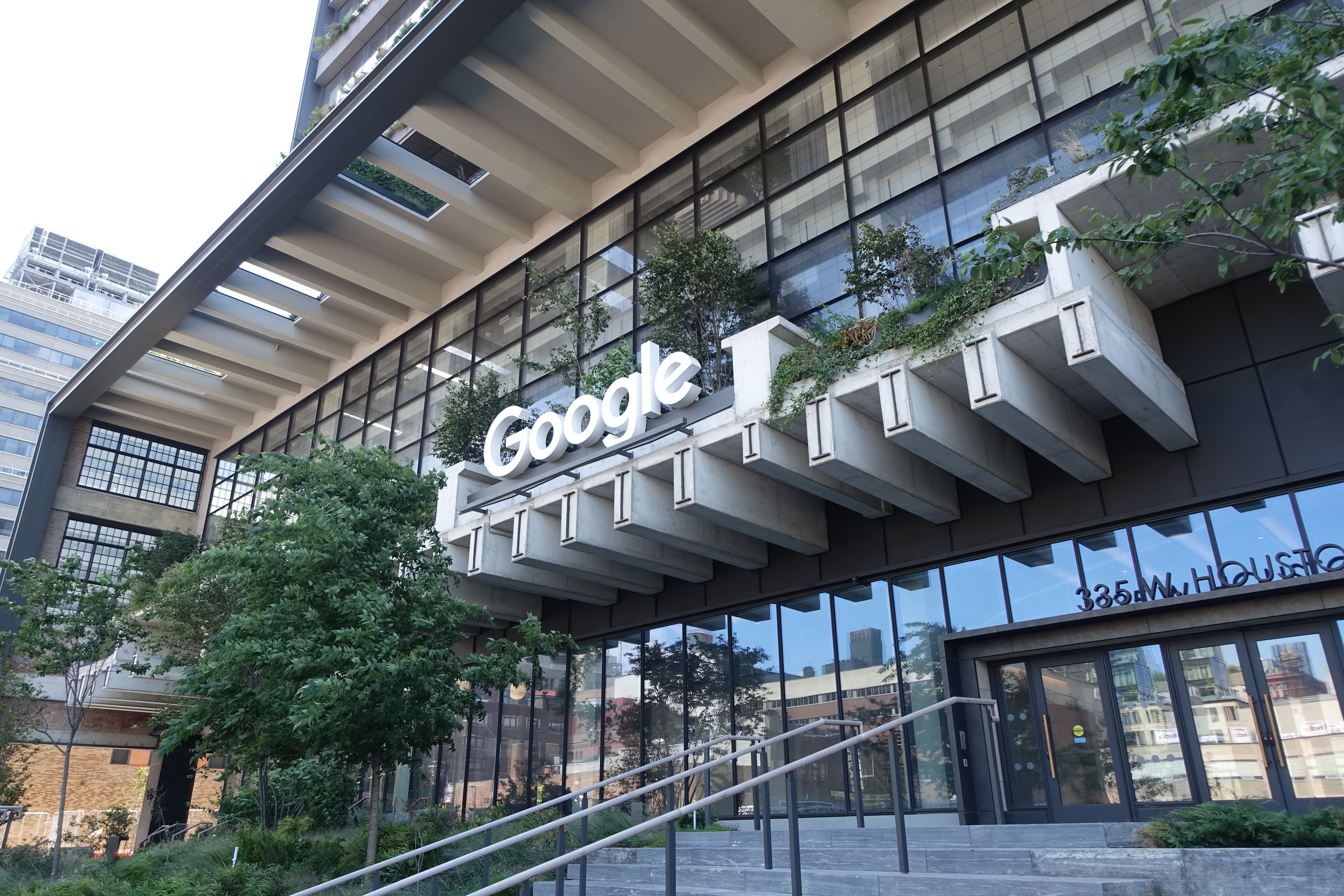
Google's headquarters at St. John's Terminal.

== Recognition ==
COOKFOX and its principals have received awards from organizations including the American Institute of Architects, the New York Landmarks Conservancy, and the New York School of Interior Design.

The firm’s projects have been featured in publications including Architectural Record, Metropolis, The Wall Street Journal, The New Yorker, and The New York Times.
