= Rick Cook =

Rick Cook may refer to:

- Rick Cook (architect) (born 1960), New York City architect
- Rick Cook (writer) (born 1944), American author of novels and stories
