= Eugene M. Grant =

American businessman (1918–2018)

- Born: Eugene Martin Greenberg; July 17, 1918; New York City, New York, U.S.
- Died: April 3, 2018 (aged 99); Westchester County, New York, U.S.
- Education: City College of New York; University of Michigan; Columbia Law School
- Occupations: Real estate investor, civic leader
- Spouse: Emily Louise Geldsaler
- Children: 3
- Parent: Samuel Greenberg

Eugene Martin Grant (July 17, 1918 – April 3, 2018) was an American real estate investor, philanthropist and civic leader. He owned several buildings in Manhattan, New York City.

== Early life ==
Eugene M. Grant was born as Eugene Martin Greenberg on July 17, 1918, in Hell's Kitchen in New York City. His father, Samuel Greenberg, had immigrated from Russia as a teenager and later became a real estate investor.

Grant graduated from the City College of New York, the University of Michigan, and the Columbia Law School. During World War II, he served in the United States Army.

== Career ==
Grant began his career by "building housing for returning veterans" with his father's company, Samuel Greenberg & Co. Shortly after, he began investing in real estate with Lionel Bauman. Together, they purchased 88 Central Park West. They subsequently purchased the old Saks building at the corner of 34th Street and Broadway.

In 1962, they purchased St. John's Terminal. He founded his own company, Eugene M. Grant & Co., in 1971. He sold his stake in St. John's Terminal in 2013.

== Civic activities ==
Grant was the chairman of the UJA-Federation of New York and the Jewish Museum. He was a founding member of the board of regents of the Center for Security Policy.

== Personal life and death ==
Grant married Emily Louise Geldsaler, of Toronto. They had three daughters. They resided in Mamaroneck, New York.

Grant died on April 3, 2018, at the age of 99. He was survived by his wife of 68 years, their three daughters (Terry, Andrea and Carolyn), and extended family. His funeral was held on April 5 at the Larchmont Temple in Larchmont, New York.

== Awards and honors ==
Eugene and his wife Emily were recognized among The New Jewish Home's Eight Over Eighty Gala 2014 honorees.
