= Bob Fox (architect) =

American architect

Robert F. Fox Jr. (born 1941) is an American architect.

== Education ==
Fox received his Bachelor of Architecture from Cornell University in 1965. It was there that he met Associate Professor Werner Seligmann, who would have a lasting impact on his architectural career. Fox later received his Master of Architecture from Harvard University in 1972.

== Career ==
In 1978, Fox co-founded Fox & Fowle Architects (now FXCollaborative) with Bruce Fowle. Fox & Fowle completed more than 30 major projects in New York City under Fox's direction. Among them was the influential 4 Times Square – also formerly known as the Condé Nast Building – which set new standards for energy-efficient skyscrapers. 4 Times Square received numerous design awards, including the prestigious National Honor Award and the Excellence in Design Award from the American Institute of Architects. In 2002, after a 25-year partnership, Fox left Fox & Fowle Architects to open Robert Fox Architects.

In 2003, Fox teamed with Rick Cook to form Cook + Fox Architects (now COOKFOX Architects). The firm is best known for the Bank of America Tower at One Bryant Park, a 2,100,000-square-foot (200,000 m2) skyscraper that is the first commercial high rise to receive the United States Green Building Council's Leadership in Energy and Environment Design (LEED) Platinum Certification.

In 2006, Fox co-founded Terrapin Bright Green, a sustainable design consultancy firm committed to creating a healthier world through research and solutions that reconnect people with nature. That same year, Fox was named as the only architect to serve on Mayor Michael Bloomberg's Advisory Council for the Office of Long-Term Planning and Sustainability.

Fox is the founding chairman of Urban Green Council, was the first recipient of the Cooper Hewitt's “Urban Visionary” Award for the Advancement of Science and Art, and was awarded the U.S. Green Building Council's highest honor, the Leadership Award for service to the green building community. Fox has exhibited work and lectured internationally on sustainable design and environmental stewardship. He has also taught courses at Cornell University, Yale University, and the Graduate School of Design at Harvard University.
