= St. John's Terminal =

Building in Manhattan, New York

Coordinates: 40.7291°N 74.0100°W

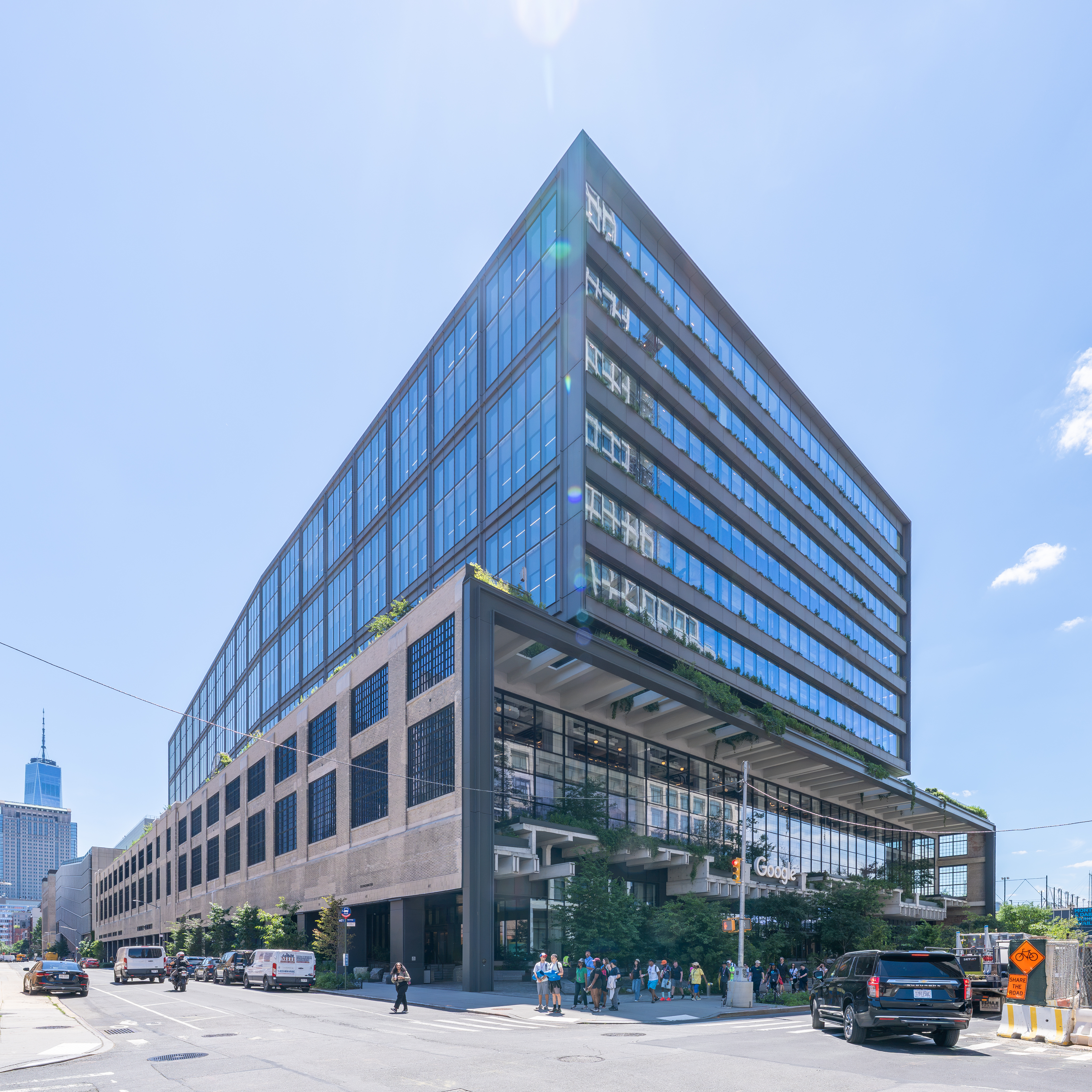
(2026)

St. John's Terminal, also known as 550 Washington Street, is a building on Washington Street in the Hudson Square neighborhood of Manhattan in New York City. Designed by Edward A. Doughtery, it was built in 1934 by the New York Central Railroad as a terminus of the High Line, an elevated freight line along Manhattan's West Side used for transporting manufacturing-related goods. The terminal could accommodate 227 train cars. The three floors, measuring 205,000 square feet (19,000 m^{2}) each, were the largest in New York City at the time of their construction.

The building was used as a freight terminal until 1960, when the freight line was decommissioned. Afterward, the building was acquired by Eugene M. Grant and Lionel Bauman, who turned the structure into a warehouse and office building. The space was used by tenants such as banks Merrill Lynch & Co. and Manufacturers Hanover Corporation, the latter of which constructed a fourth story in 1966. The terminal was largely used by Merrill Lynch by the early 1990s. Afterward, St. John's Terminal was used for corporate real estate and offices.

Eugene Grant sold a majority ownership stake in the building to a joint venture of Atlas Capital Group, Fortress Investment Group, and Westbrook Partners in 2013. The developers initially planned a mixed-use development on the site, with residences, retail, and offices, using air rights purchased from the adjoining Pier 40. Though the plans were modified in response to community input, the plans stalled in 2017, and Oxford Properties and Canada Pension Plan bought the southern three-quarters of the site in early 2018. Oxford and CPP hired COOKFOX Architects to design an office redevelopment with nine additional stories above the original three floors; AAI Architects, P.C. was the architect of record. The building was purchased in 2021 by Google, which planned to occupy the building as part of a Hudson Square campus. The redevelopment was completed in February 2024.

== Rail terminal ==
St. John's Terminal was built by the New York Central Railroad as the southern terminus to the High Line, an elevated segment of the West Side Line on the west side of Manhattan. Prior to the development of the High Line, the West Side Line terminated at a ground-level structure at St. John's Park. By the early 20th century, there were frequent collisions along the street-level route, leading the New York Transit Commission to order in January 1929 that all grade crossings on the West Side Line be removed. The street-level route was to be replaced with a viaduct as part of the West Side Improvement Project, which the Interstate Commerce Commission approved in December 1929.

By early 1930, the NYCR was acquiring land for the elevated Spring Street freight terminal, which would replace the old ground-level St. John's Park terminal. Plans for the new terminal were announced that July. The building was to measure 1,250 feet (380 m) long between Clarkson Street to the north and Spring Street to the south, and it would have an average width of 250 feet (76 m) between West Street to the west and Washington Street to the east. The terminal would replace eighty-eight existing tenements, which were already being demolished. Though plans for the above-ground section of the terminal had not been finalized, it was expected to be either four or seven stories tall based on subsurface conditions. Preliminary designs for a 12-story structure, designed by Edward A. Doughtery, were filed with the New York City Department of Buildings in March 1931. According to a later New York Times article, there were plans for the building to be 17 stories tall. By that November, the site had largely been cleared.

The NYCR had hoped to rent out the space on the higher floors for commercial purposes. The structure would have contained 3.6 million square feet (330,000 m^{2}) had it been built to that size. The plans called for tracks on the second floor, capable of accommodating 190 railcars, as well as loading docks at ground level. The work entailed closing off King, Charlton, and Spring Streets and a bridge over Houston Street. In February 1932, the NYCR requested a $7.5 million loan to fund the West Side Improvement, including the new freight depot. Initially, $10 million would be spent to build a portion of the terminal to meet "current needs". That November, revised plans were filed for a three-story building with a projected cost of $2.5 million. According to a contemporary New York Times article, the reduction of size was due to cost, as the original structure would have $12.5 million. However, a later Times article cited opposition from brokers as a reason for reducing the building's height. The building would serve only the NYCR's own direct purposes as a rail terminal; the structure had pilings capable of handling a larger building should the situation change.

The Spring Street Terminal and the elevated rail viaduct were dedicated on June 29, 1934, with ceremonies at the terminal building. With the opening of the new terminal, the NYCR filed plans to abandon the nearby Franklin Street station, which was being used to make local deliveries. The terminal quickly became known as St. John's Park Terminal because the old terminal had been so well known. The building was noted for its unusually large floor areas compared to other Manhattan buildings, where properties are usually subdivided more narrowly. The floors, measuring 205,000 square feet (19,000 m^{2}) each, were the largest in New York City at the time of their construction. Each story could accommodate a load of 300 pounds per square foot (14 kPa). The terminal itself was large enough to accommodate 227 train cars. The third floor was leased in 1937 to the Borden Company, which used that space as a warehouse for refrigeration equipment.

== Warehouse and office building ==
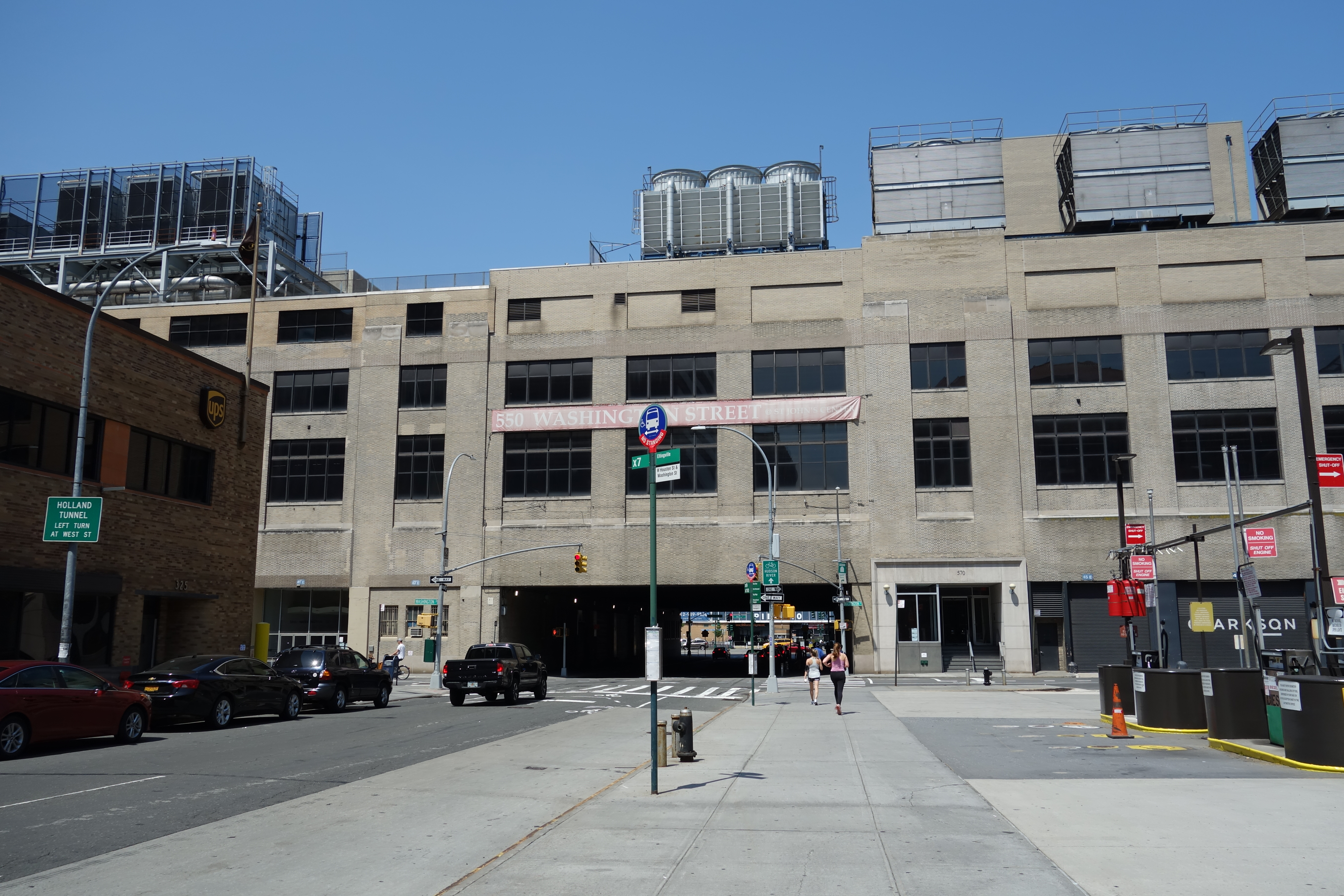
550 Washington Street in 2018, with the original three floors and the fourth floor later addition

Rail freight declined after World War II, affecting traffic on the West Side elevated freight line. In January 1960, the New York Central was granted permission to cease rail service to St. John's Terminal.

Eugene M. Grant and Lionel Bauman purchased St. John's Terminal in 1960 or 1962. The building was renovated into 750,000 square feet (70,000 m^{2}) of offices. Among the first tenants of the St. John's Terminal Building was the Oberly & Newell Lithographic Corporation, Other office tenants included McKenzie Service Inc., a bookbinding firm; the Railway Express Agency; and N. Erlanger Blumgart & Co., one of the oldest textile companies in New York City. City Specialty Stores, a specialty store, occupied a warehouse facility on the entire third floor, renovating that story with a cafeteria, clinic, restrooms, and air-conditioning. Additionally, a tennis club took up some space on the roof. The tennis club's lease was arranged after broker William J. Hirschman, who was using a helicopter to look for suitable space, spotted the roof of St. John's Terminal. The Manufacturers Hanover Corporation, a bank that also occupied space in the building, added a fourth story in 1966 to consolidate its investment operations. The additional floor spanned 135,000 square feet (12,500 m^{2}). During 1968, investment bank Merrill Lynch & Co. leased 125,000 square feet (11,600 m^{2}) across the terminal.

Grant and Bauman started to advertise St. John's Terminal as a cheap office location in the 1980s. The cheap office space attracted tenants such as Bloomberg L.P. By 1991, Merrill Lynch occupied 700,000 square feet (65,000 m^{2}) in St. John's Terminal and was negotiating to occupy another 300,000 square feet (28,000 m^{2}) of space. By then, the building was called St. John's Center, and its floors were being marketed at $12 per square foot ($130/m^{2}).

== Redevelopment ==
=== Canceled mixed-use plans ===
In January 2013, Grant sold his 50.1 percent controlling stake for $250 million to a joint venture of Atlas Capital Group, Fortress Investment Group, and Westbrook Partners. That November, Atlas and the Hudson River Park Trust signed a memorandum of understanding (MOU) in which Atlas would buy unused air rights above Pier 40, directly to the west. Atlas would use the air rights to redevelop the St. John's site over the following ten years, starting with the northern section of St. John's Terminal. The MOU was first publicized in May 2014. News of the MOU generated much public and political opposition, especially from Manhattan elected officials, who objected that the MOU had been made secretly. This led to the cancellation of the MOU the next month.

In September 2014, Atlas proposed purchasing 250,000 square feet (23,000 m^{2}) of air rights from Pier 40. The air rights transfer would enable the addition of between 150 and 200 affordable housing units facing away from the river. The project would also include condominiums and retail. The redevelopment would proceed in two phases because Bloomberg LP still occupied part of the terminal site. In August 2015, Westbrook Partners bought a $200 million ownership stake, giving it majority control of the building. The Hudson River Park Trust agreed that October to sell air rights above Pier 40.

Cookfox announced plans for the St. John's Terminal site in November 2014. The northern end of the site would contain the largest residential building, a 430-foot-tall (130 m) tower with market-rate residences. There would also be 175 senior-housing units, 40,000 square feet (3,700 m^{2}) of retail, and 105,000 square feet (9,800 m^{2}) in the basement that could be used for big-box retail. The center of the site would contain a residential building with affordable and market-rate units, a residential building entirely composed of market-rate units, and a garden connecting the towers. At the south end of the site would be a 350-unit hotel and a mews. The former railroad loading platforms would be converted into a park similar to the High Line. In total, the development would contain 1,586 units. Some 200,000 square feet (19,000 m^{2}) of air rights from Pier 40, as well as 500,000 square feet (46,000 m^{2}) of additional rights from an "upzoning", would be used to increase the floor area ratio from 5 to 8.7. Neighborhood groups, including the Greenwich Village Society for Historic Preservation, expressed concerns that the additional office space would make the development excessively large.

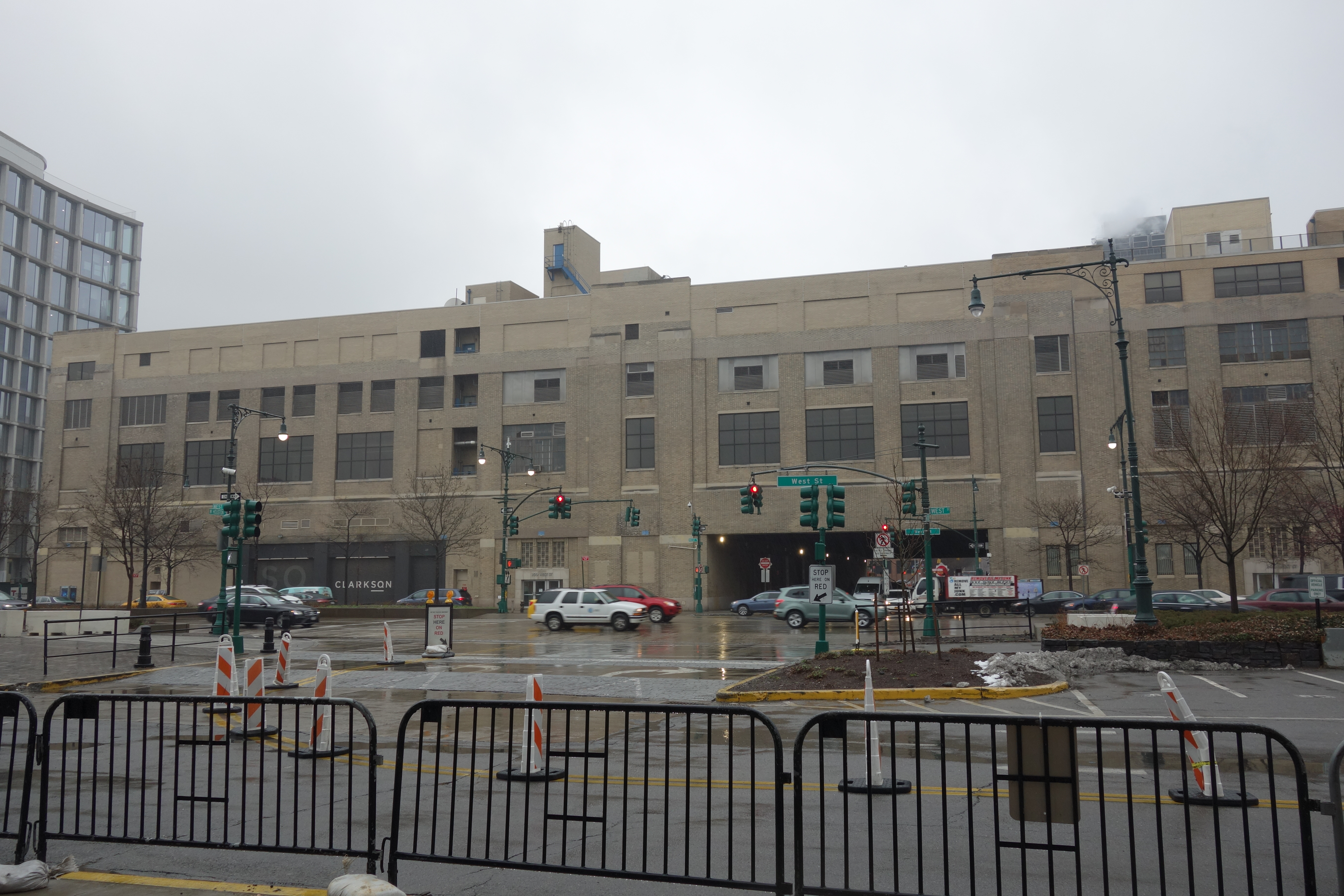
West front of St. John's Terminal viewed from Pier 40 in 2018

A Uniform Land Use Review Procedure meeting was held in June 2016 to discuss the proposed air-rights transfer from Pier 40. At the meeting, residents of West Village and Hudson Square expressed concerns that the air-rights transfer could set a precedent for excessively large transfers for future projects. These concerns were repeated at a meeting that August. Residents said the redevelopment could exacerbate traffic congestion and discussed whether St. John's Terminal needed a planned 772-space parking lot. The developers altered the plans in October 2016, eliminating the elevated park and big-box retail space. Following the revisions to the plans, Atlas and Westfield anticipated that the redevelopment could be delayed, leading to concerns that the Hudson River Park Trust might not receive money to repair Pier 40. The New York City Council approved the transfer of air rights from Pier 40 in December 2016, and Atlas and Westfield purchased the air rights for $100 million in May 2017. In the meantime, the building was used as an event space, Skylight Clarkson Square and Skylight Clarkson North. By late 2017, Brookfield Properties was discussing whether to join Atlas and Westfield in the project.

=== Google campus ===
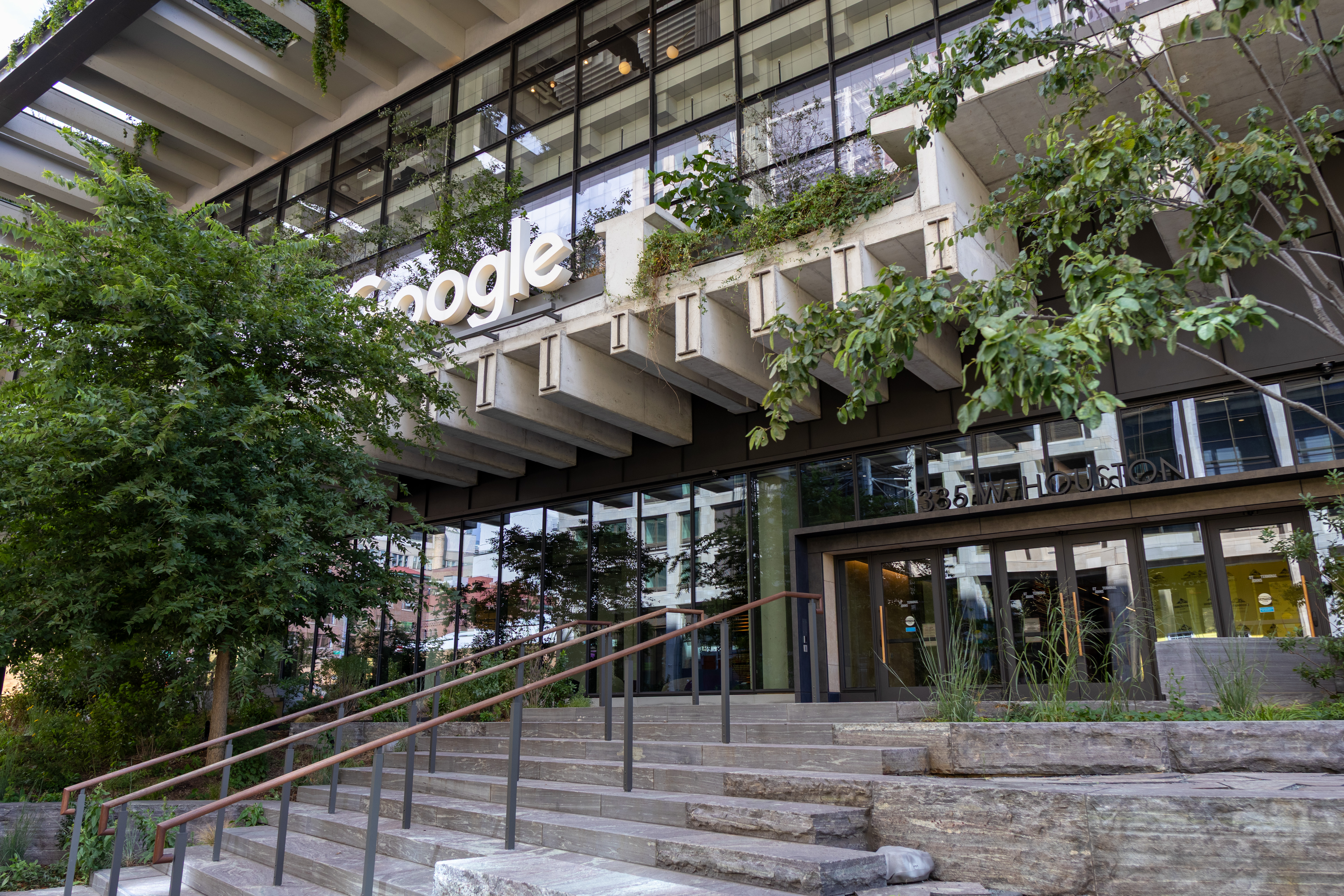
Exterior of Google's NYC headquarters at St. John's Terminal in September 2025

Oxford Properties entered the joint venture for the project in October 2017. The following January, Oxford paid Westfield and Atlas $700 million for the portion of the St. John's Terminal site south of Houston Street. Canada Pension Plan was the junior partner in the project, with a 40 percent stake in the development. Deutsche Bank provided $400 million of financing for the acquisition. That October, Cookfox Architects announced their designs for the redevelopment of the St. John's Terminal site, which called for a wholly commercial development. According to Oxford's U.S. development executive Dean Shapiro, the firm had planned a taller building but instead decided to create a low structure with large floor plates of 100,000 square feet (9,300 m^{2}). The first and second floors would have ceilings of up to 28 feet (8.5 m), while a new glass annex would rise nine stories above the existing third floor, with ceiling heights of 16 feet (4.9 m). According to renderings, the existing fourth story of the terminal would be removed to make way for the addition. The overpass over Houston Street would be eliminated. Three outdoor decks would be created on the redeveloped structure. AAI Architects, P.C. served as the architect of record.

Google began redeveloping the buildings at 345 and 315 Hudson Street to create a "Google Hudson Square" campus in 2018, along with the redevelopment of 550 Washington Street. The redeveloped building would be 12 stories tall and contain 120,000 square feet (11,000 m^{2}) on each floor. Work began in 2019 when the structure over Houston Street was demolished, as was the section of the terminal north of Houston Street. By early 2020, the floor slabs of the expanded building were being constructed. Oxford received a $973 million loan from Wells Fargo in February 2020, and the new addition topped out that November. Metropolis magazine wrote that, by reusing the existing structure, Google reduced the project's embedded emissions by 78,400 metric tons (86,400 short tons; 77,200 long tons).

Google began leasing space in the completed parts of the campus in 2020–2021, although the company did not immediately move in due to the COVID-19 pandemic. In September 2021, Google announced it was purchasing the 550 Washington Street building outright for approximately US$2.1 billion, using it as an additional corporate office. This was comparable to the price of Google's $1.9 billion purchase of the Port Authority Building at 111 Eighth Avenue in Chelsea in 2010 and Google's $2.4 billion purchase of Chelsea Market in 2018. New York is Google's second largest city by number of employees in its offices, behind only its main Mountain View, California, offices in Silicon Valley. At the time, many office employees were continuing to work from home due to the COVID-19 pandemic, but Google officials expressed optimism that the office space would be filled when the renovation was completed. Google finalized its acquisition of the building in April 2022, and Google formally opened its office on February 21, 2024. After the St. John's Terminal offices opened, Google sought to sublease parts of its space at 345 Hudson Street.

==== Architecture and design ====
St. John's Terminal in 2022, with construction for Google still ongoing

As part of the Google redevelopment, prefabricated, modular slabs of precast concrete were constructed using bridge-construction methods. Two mechanical cores of 14 stories, each with emergency staircases and 14 elevator shafts connecting the roof to the basement, were also built. The precast structure contains a steel framing to stabilize the original terminal building, allowing the newer stories to be built without bracing. The prefabricated slabs and the steel frame were built using the same two cranes. Following the expansion, the building rises 232 feet (71 m) high, with 12 stories. On the northern elevation of the building (facing Houston Street), where the old terminal has been cut away, the track beds of the old terminal are visible, overhanging the main entrance. Due to its large width–height ratio, the building has been referred to as a "groundscraper"; Justin Davidson, architecture critic for Curbed, called the development "a city within a building".

The interiors of the Google offices were designed by Gensler. The entry hall is three stories high with a kitchen, seating areas, and a coffee bar. The workstations are clustered into 60 groups as part of a "neighborhood seating" layout, in which teams are assigned specific areas. There is also a double-level, 330-seat auditorium with Guastavino-like tile designs. The spaces are decorated with New York City–related details; for example, the conference rooms depict wooden construction walls and assorted objects, while a Google sign in the lobby has depictions of items such as taxicabs and the Statue of Liberty. There are also plants inside the offices. Following the project's completion, the building has had nearly 1.5 acres (0.61 ha) of native plants on its roof garden, as well as a rainwater collection system with a capacity of 92,000 U.S. gallons (350,000 L; 77,000 imp gal). There are also solar panels on the roof, in addition to wood salvaged from the Riegelmann Boardwalk on Coney Island.

=== Northern site redevelopment ===
The 1.3-acre site formerly occupied by the portion of St. John's Terminal north of Houston Street is being developed into a two-tower housing complex (570 Washington Street and 80 Clarkson Street) by Zeckendorf Development, Atlas Capital Group, and The Baupost Group. The developers acquired the site in February 2022. The planned development will contain a mix of affordable senior housing and condominiums. The senior housing is at 570 Washington Street, which has 176 rental apartments and measures 400 feet (120 m) tall, with 29 stories. The taller tower is at 80 Clarkson Street, which has either 131 or 133 condominiums and measures 450 feet (140 m) tall, with 36 stories. Both towers have limestone facades with bronze window frames, along with multiple setbacks. COOKFOX Architects and SLCE Architects were hired to design both buildings.

Blackstone Inc. provided a $322 million loan to the developers in 2022 to acquire the site and begin development. Further financing was provided in 2024. In August 2025, a housing lottery was initiated for 122 of the senior housing units. The condominiums were priced at up to $63 million, amid a trend of wealthy buyers increasingly acquiring property in Lower Manhattan.

== See also ==
- Googleplex
- St. John's Park
- West Side Line
