= Rick Cook (architect) =

American architect

Richard A. Cook (born 1960) is an American New York City-based architect, best known for designing the Bank of America Tower at One Bryant Park, a 2,100,000-square-foot (200,000 m^{2}) skyscraper that is the first commercial high rise to receive the United States Green Building Council's Leadership in Energy and Environmental Design (LEED) Platinum Certification.

In 1992, Cook became a founding partner in the firm Richard Cook & Associates. He developed a portfolio ranging from master planning to various commercial and residential projects, including The Caroline, one of the largest new buildings ever completed in a New York City historic district; the Chelsea Grande, which received a Charter Award from the Congress for New Urbanism; and 360 Madison Avenue, which was called "the best new building in years" by the New York Sun.

Cook joined with his longtime mentor and friend Robert F. Fox, Jr. to form COOKFOX (formerly Cook+Fox Architects) in 2003. To date, COOKFOX has completed 4 LEED Platinum projects in New York City, including the firm's own studio, Skanska's full floor office in the Empire State Building, One Bryant Park, and St. John's Terminal. COOKFOX designed the award-winning redevelopment of the Historic South Street Seaport neighborhood and the new Henry Miller's Theatre- the first green Broadway theater. COOKFOX also designed the Center for Friends Without a Border, a visitor center for the Angkor Hospital for Children in Siem Reap, Cambodia. As part of their involvement with this project, COOKFOX implemented “The Green Initiative,” a social venture to fund five local NGOs through the production of sustainable fuels; the project was a semi-finalist in the 2010 Buckminster Fuller Challenge.

== Significant works ==
=== Institutional projects ===
Project	Location	Year
Ross Institute Center for Well-Being	East Hampton, NY	2001
Stephen Sondheim Theater	New York, NY	2009
Center for Friends Without a Border	Siem Reap, Cambodia	2008
Neeson Cripps Academy	Phnom Penh, Cambodia	2017
Marymount School of New York	New York, NY	2024
Bruce Springsteen Center for American Music	Long Branch, NJ	2026

=== Workplace projects ===
Project	Location	Year
360 Madison	New York, NY	2001
401 West 14th Street	New York, NY	2008
The Bank of America Tower at One Bryant Park	New York, NY	2009
300 Lafayette	New York, NY	2019
512 West 22nd Street	New York, NY	2019
555 Greenwich	New York, NY	2023
St. John's Terminal	New York, NY	2024
Terminal Warehouse	New York, NY	2026

=== Residential projects ===
Project	Location	Year
Chelsea Grande	New York, NY	2000
Atalanta	New York, NY	2001
The Caroline	New York, NY	2001
Historic Front Street	New York, NY	2004
The Hegeman	Brooklyn, NY	2012
150 Charles	New York, NY	2015
City Point	Brooklyn, NY	2016
Betances Residence	Bronx, NY	2022
378 West End Avenue	New York, NY	2023
Armani Residences	New York, NY	2025
80 Clarkson Street	New York, NY	
