= Brooklyn Grange =

Rooftop farming and green roofing business in NYC

- The Grange
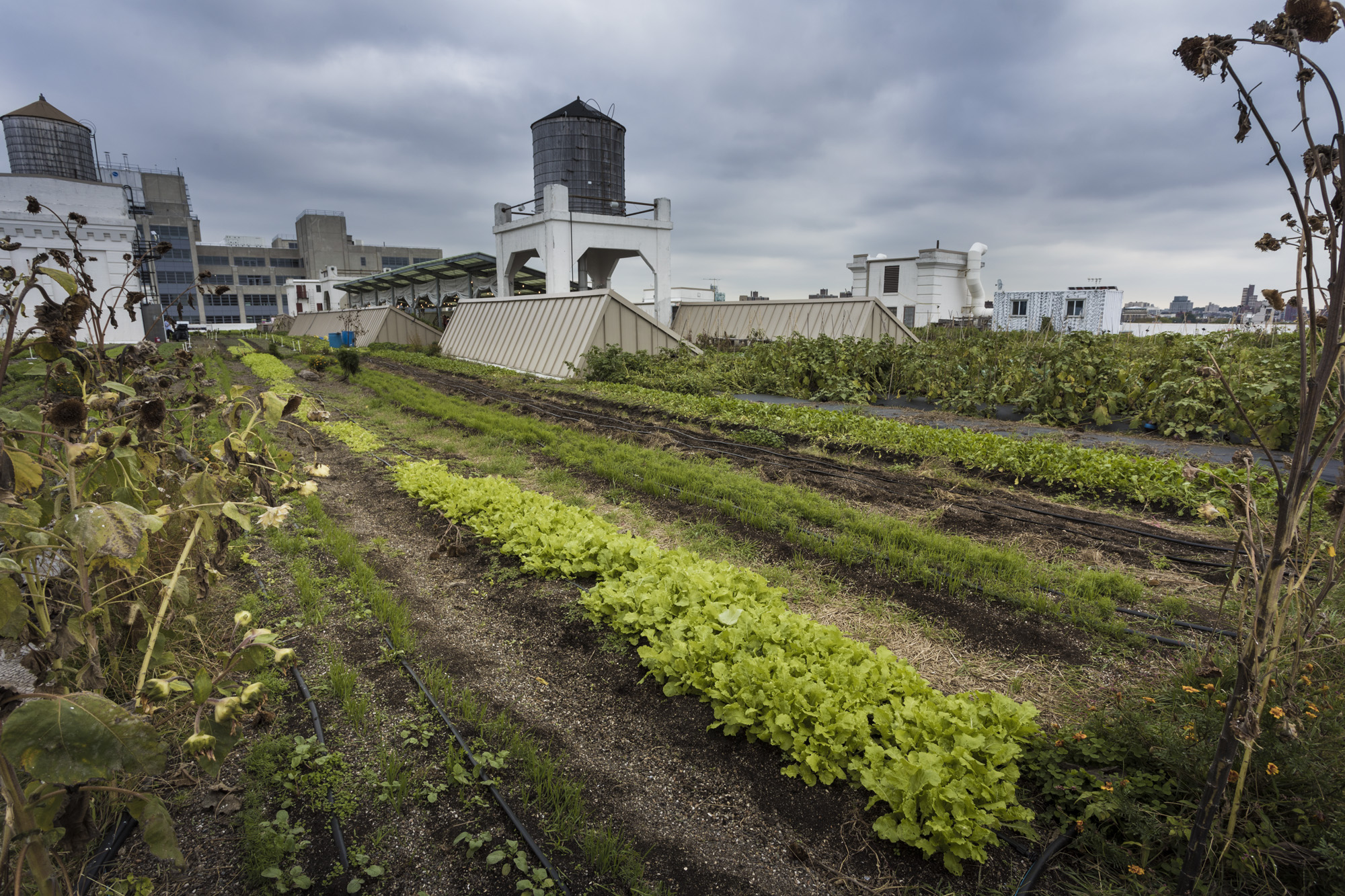
- Interactive map of Brooklyn Grange
- Type: Roof garden, Urban Farm
- Location: New York City
- Area: 140,000 sq ft (13,000 m^{2})
- Created: April 2010
- Facilities: 3
- Website: brooklyngrangefarm.com

Brooklyn Grange is a 5.6-acre organic urban rooftop farm in New York City, growing vegetables and honey for local restaurants, markets, and community-supported agriculture. The farm is located on three rooftops in Brooklyn and Queens. The first rooftop farm was established in 2010 on a 43,000 square feet building straddling Astoria and Long Island City areas. The second location was built in 2012 atop the Brooklyn Navy Yard and the third farm, established in 2019, is located at Liberty View in Sunset Park, Brooklyn. All three locations encompass 140,000 square feet of space, making it the largest rooftop farm in New York City. Annually, 80,000 pounds (36,000 kg) of organic vegetables are grown.

The Grange also operates New York City's largest apiary, with over 40 naturally managed beehives, which yields approximately 1,500 pounds (680 kg) of honey annually. The Grange was co-founded in April 2010 by Ben Flanner (President), Anastasia Plakias (Vice President), and Gwen Schantz (COO). The group took out loans, contributed their own savings, and found initial investors to fund the project. The Brooklyn Navy Yard farm was financed in part by a US$592,730 grant from the NYCDEP's Green Infrastructure Grant Program. Brooklyn Grange provides urban farming, green roof consulting, and installation services to clients worldwide as well as partner with numerous non-profit organizations throughout New York.

== Background ==
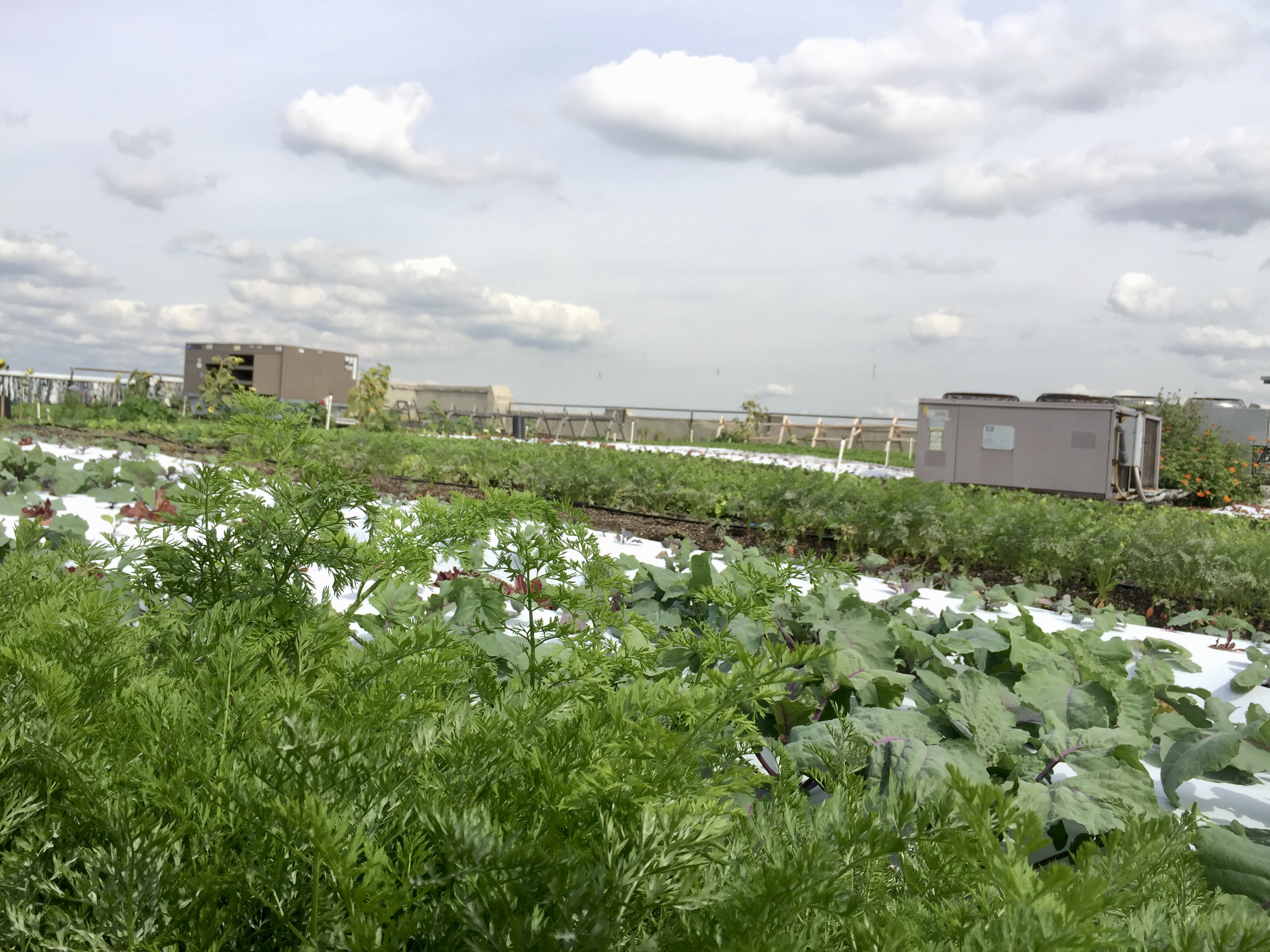
Long Island Grange rooftop, with the visible white root barrier in background

All three farms consist of green roof systems laid down before the soil. For the first farm off of Northern Blvd, the construction took six days of craning 3,000 pounds (1,400 kg) of soil sacks, seven building stories up to the roof. Brooklyn Grange laid down a series of drainage plates distributed by Conservation Technologies. The system is as follows: a layer of root-barrier, which prevents the plants’ roots from penetrating the surface of the roof; a thick layer of felt; drainage mats with small cups to hold excess water from heavy rainstorms (the soil and plants wick this stored water up in dry conditions to keep water use down), and finally, a thin layer of felt to prevent the drainage mats from filling up with soil.

At the Brooklyn Navy Yard location the farm has a green roof system which consists of a lightweight drainage aggregate, with a layer of similar felt above to filter the solid particles and keep the system together.

The soil is sourced from Skyland, Pennsylvania, a green roof media supplier. Almost a million pounds of the blend made up of Rooflite, an engineered soil mix that contains no actual soil, has been used. The stones from the Rooflite material make the soil lighter in weight and also slowly break down to add trace minerals needed for plant nutrition. The beds are about 8 feet (2.4 m) to 12 feet (3.7 m) deep and include shallow walkways.

== Brooklyn Farmer ==
Brooklyn Grange's expansion is documented in the 2013 film Brooklyn Farmer, which premiered at Doc NYC in November 2013. The documentary follows the Brooklyn Grange team as they expanded their farm to the second rooftop location at the Brooklyn Navy Yard. It also explored the unique challenges inherent in operating a large, urban rooftop farm. The film focused on Head Farmer Ben Flanner to explore the day-to-day operations of the farm and COO Gwen Schantz to look at the organization as a business. The film was directed by Michael Tyburski and produced by Burke Cherrie and Ben Nabors in association with Group Theory.
