= Burger & Lobster =

British restaurant chain

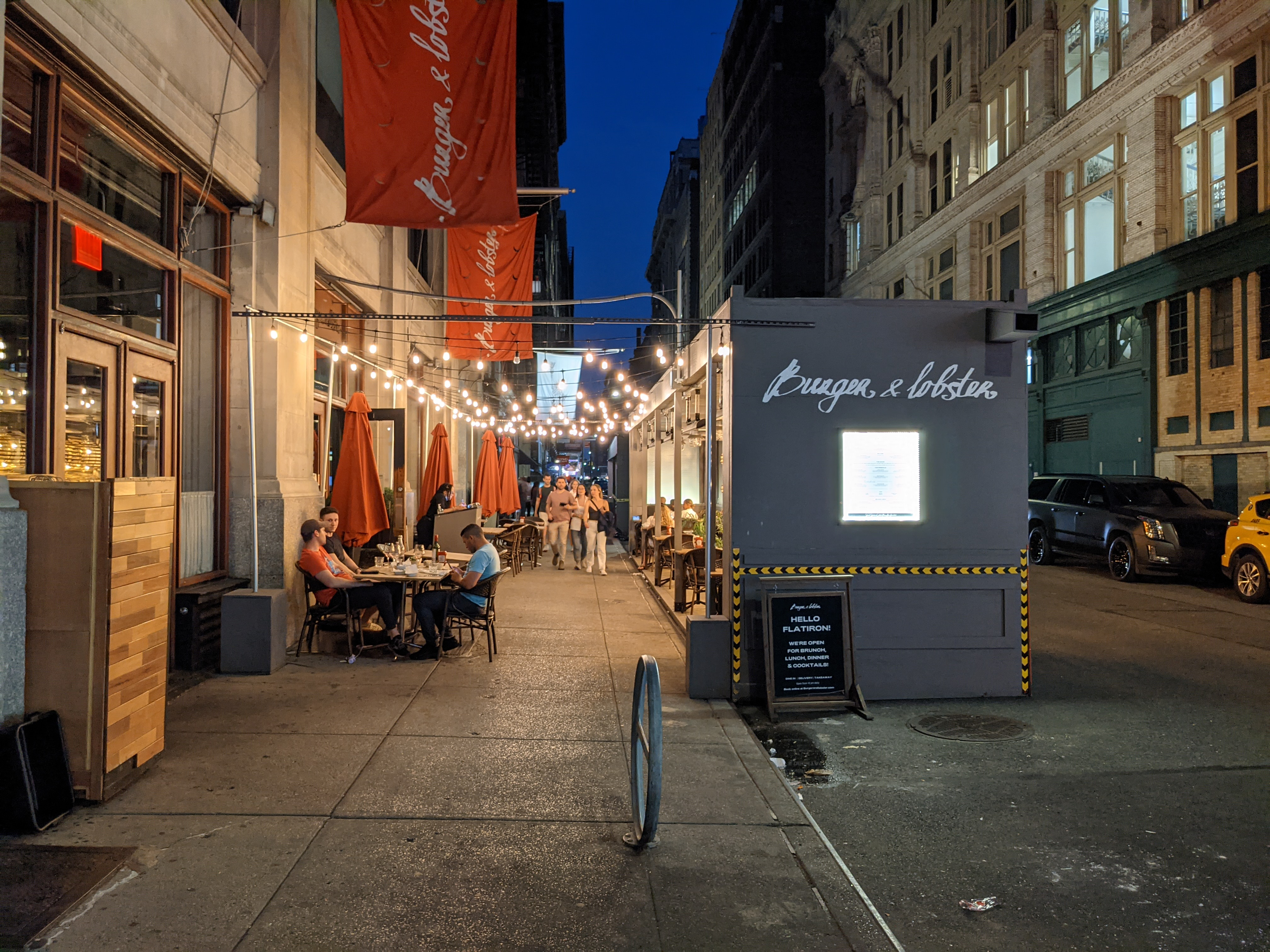
Burger & Lobster, New York City in 2021

Burger & Lobster is a British restaurant chain.

Burger & Lobster was founded in 2011 by Misha Zelman, Roman Zelman, Ilya Demichev, and George Bukhov-Weinstein.

Misha Zelman was CEO until September 2025, when he was succeeded by Dino Sura, managing director for the company's UK and US sites.

As well as the UK, they have branches in Thailand, Kuwait, Malaysia, Philippines, Qatar and the US.
