= Terminal Warehouse =

Historic building in Maryland, USA

- U.S. National Register of Historic Places
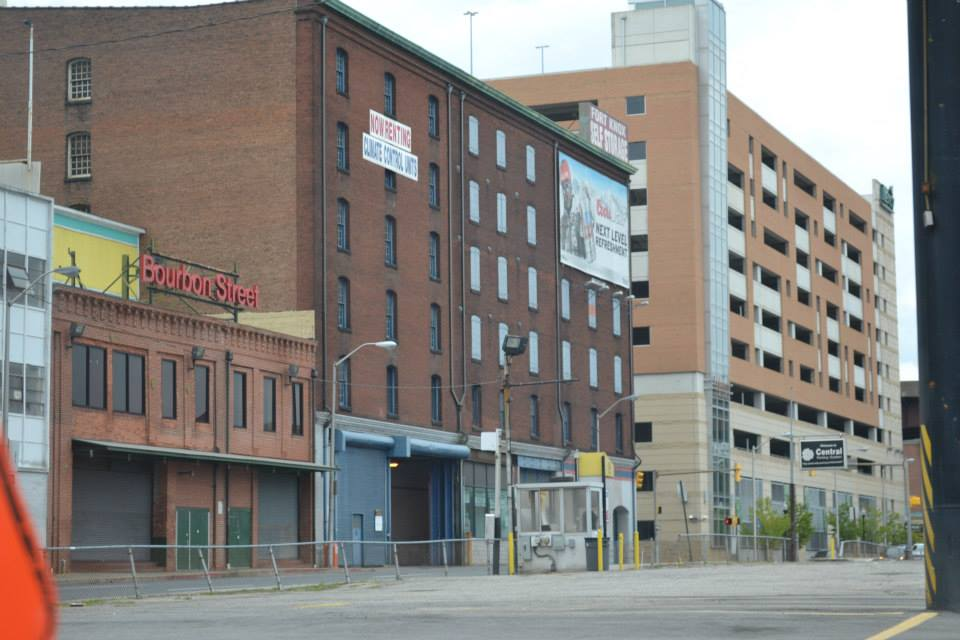
- Warehouse in 2013

- Location within Baltimore Location within Maryland Location within the United States
- Location: 211 E. Pleasant St., Baltimore, Maryland
- Coordinates: 39°17′36″N 76°36′40″W
- Area: 0.6 acres (0.24 ha)
- Built: 1894
- Architect: Owens, Benjamin B.; Et al.
- NRHP reference No.: 78003144
- Added to NRHP: November 14, 1978

Terminal Warehouse, also known as the Flour Warehouse of Terminal Corporation, is a historic warehouse building located at Baltimore, Maryland, United States. It has a common bond brick exterior accented by a rusticated brownstone foundation built originally in 1894, with a steel beam addition constructed in 1912. It was designed by noted Baltimore architect Benjamin B. Owens.

Terminal Warehouse was listed on the National Register of Historic Places in 1978.
