= Cosentini Associates =

U.S. engineering firm

- Established: 1952
- Founder: William R. Cosentini
- Headquarters: 498 Seventh Avenue; New York, NY 10018; United States
- Services: Mechanical, Electrical, Plumbing, Fire Protection, IT/AV/Security, Lighting Design, Sustainable Services, Code Consulting and Fire Engineering, Commissioning
- Website: www.cosentini.com

Cosentini Associates is an engineering firm that provides consulting engineering services for the building industry.

== Company history ==
Cosentini Associates was founded in 1952 by William Randolph Cosentini as W.R. Cosentini and Associates. William Cosentini was the second born child of Italian immigrant parents Eugenio and Vincenza Cosentini. He earned his MA in mechanical engineering from New York University. Two years after founding the company, William Cosentini died in 1954 at 41 years of age.

The company was established to provide consulting services in the mechanical and electrical engineering disciplines. What started out as a six-person firm has grown to employ more than 300 workers. The company is headquartered at 498 Seventh Avenue in New York City. The firm also has offices in other US cities including Boston, Chicago, Philadelphia and Houston.

In 1999, Cosentini was acquired by Tetra Tech, Inc., a nationwide alliance offering consulting, engineering, and technical services.

== Notable projects ==
=== 1950s ===
- SUNY Albany's Uptown Campus, Edward Durell Stone
- Time-Life Building (Chicago), Wallace Harrison of Harrison, Abramovitz, and Harris

=== 1960s ===
- Huntington Hartford Museum, Edward Durell Stone
- Ford Foundation Building, Kevin Roche and John Dinkeloo of KRJDA
- Habitat 67, Moshe Safdie
- IBM Pavilion, 1964-1965 New York World's Fair, Eero Saarinen
- Israel Museum, Alfred Mansfeld, Armand Bartos, and Frederick Kiesler
- New England Aquarium, Peter Chermayeff of Cambridge Seven Associates

=== 1970s ===
- Field Museum of Natural History restoration, Harry Weese
- Grand 1894 Opera House renovation, Hardy Holzman Pfeiffer
- IDS Center, Philip Johnson
- John F. Kennedy Presidential Library and Museum, I. M. Pei
- John Hancock Tower, Henry N. Cobb of I. M. Pei & Partners
- Solar One, Mária Telkes
- Solow Building, Gordon Bunshaft of Skidmore, Owings & Merrill
- Washington Metro, Harry Weese

=== 1980s ===
- 499 Park Avenue, James Ingo Freed of I. M. Pei & Partners
- Carnegie Hall Tower, César Pelli
- Crystal Cathedral, Philip Johnson
- Lipstick Building, Philip Johnson
- AT&T Building, Philip Johnson
- United Airlines Terminal at O'Hare International Airport, Helmut Jahn of Murphy/Jahn Architects

=== 1990s ===
- 4 Times Square, Bruce Fowle of Fox & Fowle
- Capella Tower, James Ingo Freed of Pei Cobb Freed & Partners
- Daniel Patrick Moynihan United States Courthouse, KPF
- Disney Animation Building, Robert A. M. Stern
- Guggenheim Museum Bilbao, Frank Gehry
- Rodin Pavilion, KPF
- United States Holocaust Memorial Museum, James Ingo Freed of Pei Cobb Freed & Partners, with Finegold Alexander & Associates
- The Forum Shops at Caesars

=== 2000s ===
- First World Towers, KPF
- IAC Building, Frank Gehry
- Linked Hybrid, Steven Holl
- National Museum of the American Indian, Douglas Cardinal, Johnpaul Jones, and GBQC Architects
- Newman Vertical Campus at Baruch College, KPF
- Lewis Science Library at Princeton University, Frank Gehry
- Richard B. Fisher Center for the Performing Arts at Bard College, Frank Gehry
- Time Warner Center, David Childs of Skidmore, Owings & Merrill
- Walt Disney Concert Hall, Frank Gehry
- Vdara

=== 2010s ===
- 11 Times Square, Bruce Fowle of FXFOWLE
- Millennium Place, Handel Architects
- New World Center, Frank Gehry
- Shanghai Tower, Gensler

=== Unbuilt ===
- Atlanta Symphony Center, Santiago Calatrava
- Chicago Spire, Santiago Calatrava
