= 3 Times Square =

Skyscraper in Manhattan, New York

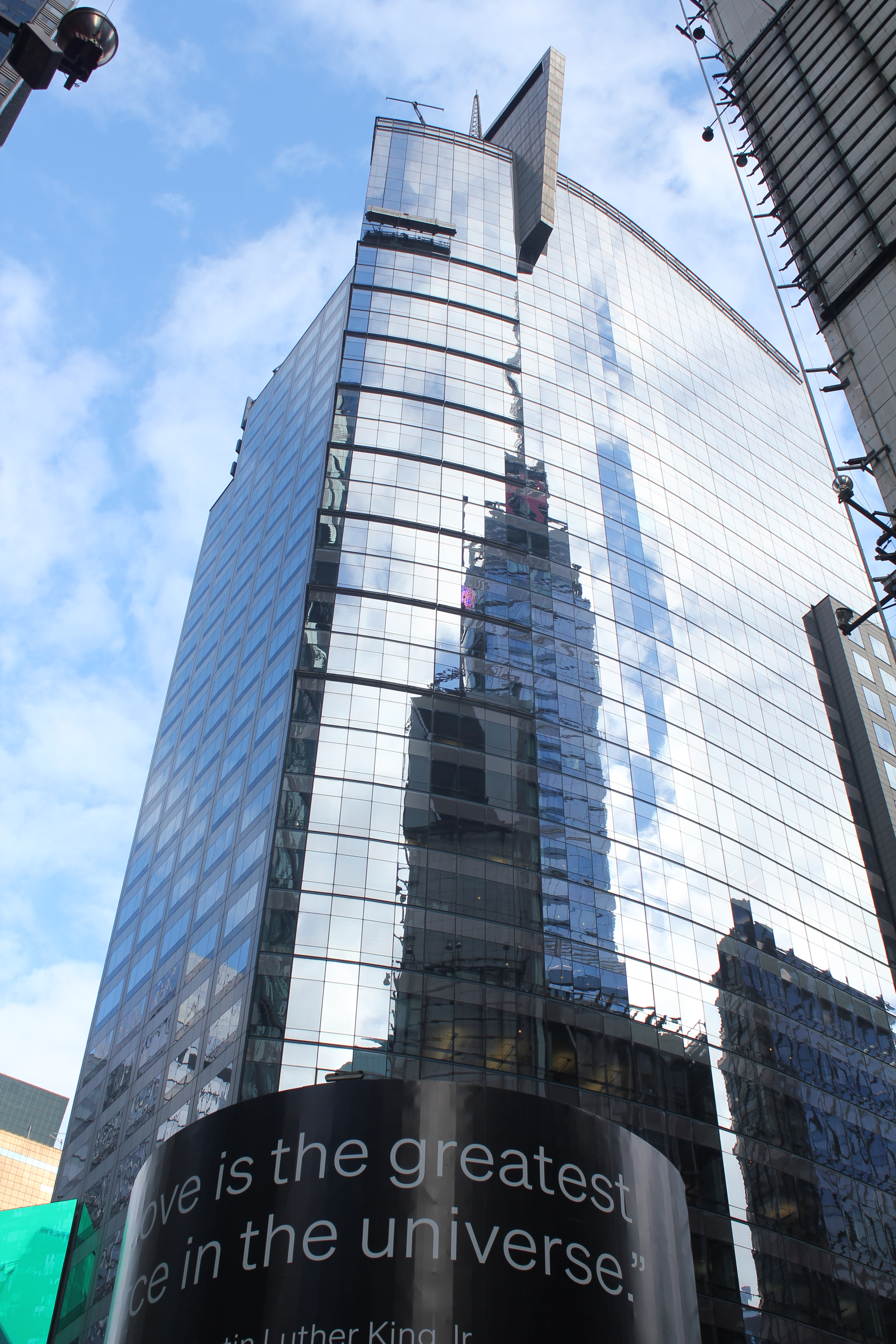
- The southwest corner as seen from 42nd Street and Seventh Avenue

General information
- Status: Completed
- Type: Commercial
- Location: 3 Times Square; Manhattan, New York 10036, U.S.
- Coordinates: 40°45′24″N 73°59′13″W
- Construction started: 1998
- Opening: 2001
- Owner: New York City Economic Development Corporation

Height
- Architectural: 555 ft (169 m)
- Antenna spire: 659 ft (201 m)
- Roof: 486 ft (148 m)
- Top floor: 448 ft (137 m)

Technical details
- Floor count: 30
- Floor area: 855,000 ft^{2} (79,400 m^{2})

Design and construction
- Architect: Fox & Fowle
- Developer: Rudin Management, Reuters
- Structural engineer: Severud Associates
- Main contractor: Tishman Construction

3 Times Square, also known as the Thomson Reuters Building, is a 30-story skyscraper at Times Square in the Midtown Manhattan neighborhood of New York City, New York, U.S. Located on Seventh Avenue between 42nd and 43rd Street, the building measures 555 feet (169 m) to its roof and 659 feet (201 m) to its spire. The building was designed by Fox & Fowle and developed by Rudin Management for news-media company Reuters. The site is owned by the New York City Economic Development Corporation, though Rudin and Reuters have a long-term leasehold on the building.

Fox & Fowle planned a portion of the facade as a glass curtain wall, though the northeast corner and the south facade are made of masonry. The eastern facade has a curving curtain wall with a wedge atop the southeast corner, as well as a triple-height lobby facing Seventh Avenue. The building contains 855,000 square feet (79,400 m^{2}) of floor space, much of which was originally taken by Reuters. The lowest three stories contain retail space and an entrance to the Times Square subway station.

During the 1980s and early 1990s, Park Tower Realty and the Prudential Insurance Company of America had planned to develop a tower for the site as part of a wide-ranging redevelopment of West 42nd Street. After the successful development of the nearby 4 Times Square, Reuters proposed consolidating its headquarters at Times Square in 1997, enlisting Rudin Management as a development partner. Work started in 1998 and the building was completed in 2001, with Reuters occupying the vast majority of the space. The building was jointly owned by Reuters and Rudin for two decades, and a renovation of the interior was announced in 2021.

== Site ==
3 Times Square is on the western side of Seventh Avenue, between 42nd and 43rd Street, at the southern end of Times Square in the Midtown Manhattan neighborhood of New York City, New York, U.S. The land lot is L-shaped and covers 29,630 ft^{2} (2,753 m^{2}), with a frontage of 200 ft (61 m) on Seventh Avenue, 131 feet (40 m) on 42nd Street, and 164 feet (50 m) on 43rd Street. 3 Times Square is at the eastern end of a city block that also contains the Todd Haimes, Lyric, and New Victory theaters. Other nearby buildings include 229 West 43rd Street and 1501 Broadway to the north, 1500 Broadway to the northeast, One Times Square and 4 Times Square to the southeast, the Times Square Tower and 5 Times Square to the south, and the New Amsterdam Theatre to the southwest.

An entrance to the New York City Subway's Times Square–42nd Street station, served by the 1, 2, 3, 7, <7>, N, Q, R, W, and S trains, is within the base of the building on 42nd Street. The subway entrance in the building is on 42nd Street, about 75 feet (23 m) west of its original location at the corner with Seventh Avenue. The entrance consists of a canopy extending above the sidewalk, as well as a staircase down to the station mezzanine. It was originally planned with escalators, but the entrance was downsized during the building's construction. A "Low Headroom" sign had to be placed on the entrance because of its reduced size.

3, 4, and 5 Times Square and the Times Square Tower comprise a grouping of office buildings that were developed at Times Square's southern end in the late 1990s and early 2000s. The surrounding area is part of Manhattan's Theater District and contains many Broadway theaters. The site on the northwest corner of 42nd Street and Seventh Avenue had historically been occupied by the Victoria Theatre, which operated from 1899 to 1915. The former theater then became the Rialto Theatre, which opened in 1916. The Rialto was rebuilt in 1935 and continued to operate until 1998, sharing a building at 1481 Broadway with several storefronts. The theater building, in its final years of operation, had a 500-seat theater and 12,000 square feet (1,100 m^{2}) in retail.

== Architecture ==
3 Times Square was designed by Fox & Fowle and developed by the Rudin family under Rudin Management. Swanke Hayden Connell Architects designed the interiors. Severud Associates was the structural engineer, while Tishman Construction was the main contractor. Other companies involved with the project included geotechnical consultant Langan Engineering, elevator contractor Otis Worldwide, and mechanical, electrical, and plumbing engineer Jaros, Baum & Bolles. The building serves as the New York City offices of Thomson Reuters. Officially, the New York City Economic Development Corporation owns the structure.

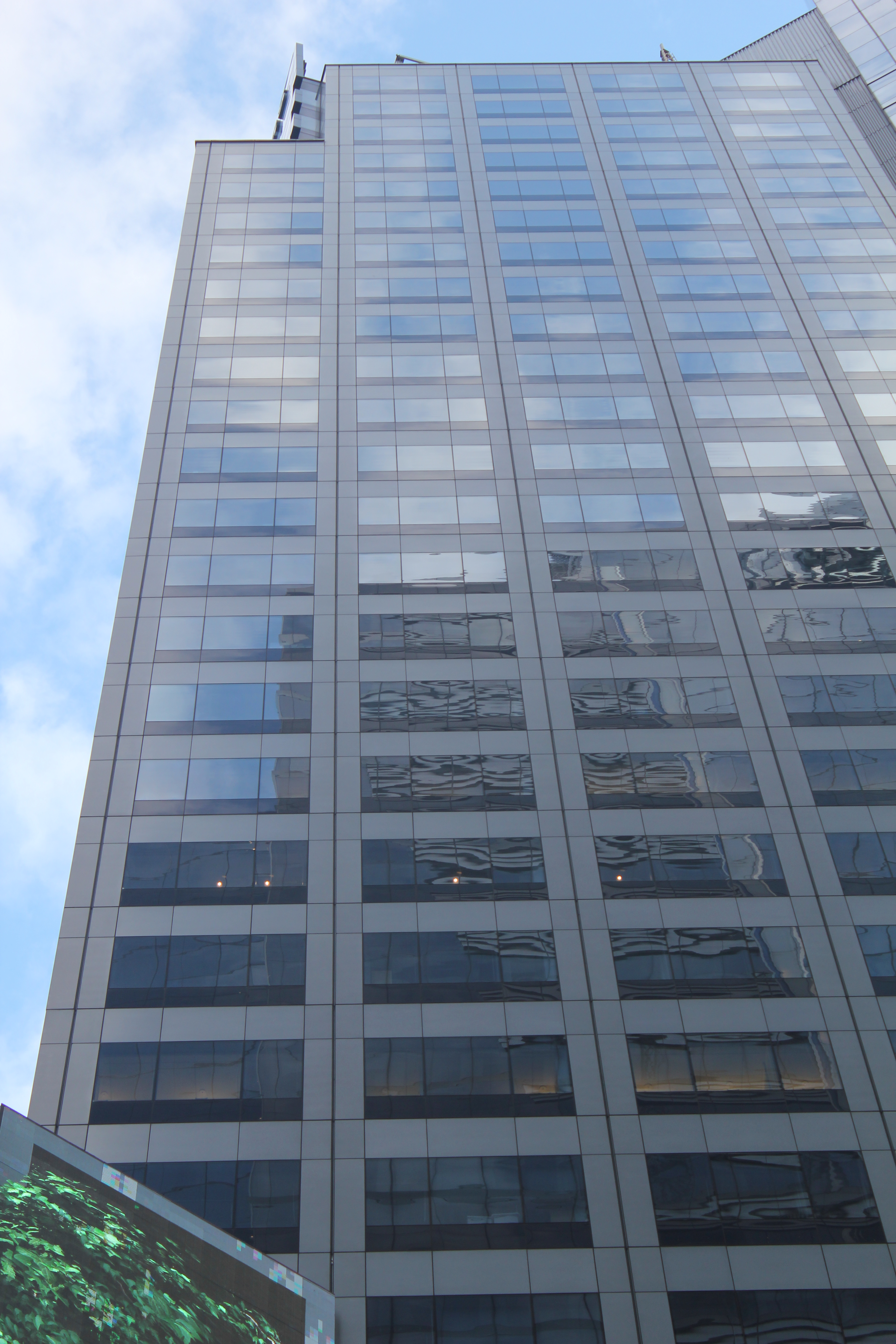
Masonry facade on 42nd Street

3 Times Square has 30 usable floors above ground. The building measures 555 feet (169 m) to its architectural tip and 659 feet (201 m) to the top of the spire. The main roof is only 486 feet (148 m) high. 3 Times Square has 855 thousand square feet (79,400 m^{2}) of space. The building is part of the 42nd Street Development Project and, thus, could bypass many city zoning rules such as those relating to floor area ratio (FAR). Bruce Fowle of Fox & Fowle estimated that the building had a FAR of 31, while The New York Times stated that the FAR was only 25.

=== Form and facade ===
The building's form was intended in part as a homage to the former Rialto Theatre. The Seventh Avenue portion of the facade is a curtain wall with a curve pointing southwest toward the nearby theaters on 42nd Street. The curved wall was intended to represent Reuters's corporate identity. At the top of the facade's southeastern corner is an illuminated blue wedge. Originally, this wedge had the Reuters logo. The wedge's presence allowed views of the nearby 5 Times Square from Times Square itself. The roof of the building had several satellite dishes, representing the building's satellite broadcasts.

Fox & Fowle designed a masonry facade on the corner of Seventh Avenue and 43rd Street, as well as along 42nd Street. The architects wanted the masonry facade to relate to surrounding masonry buildings such as 1501 Broadway and the New Victory Theatre. In addition, the masonry facade contrasts with the curtain wall on Seventh Avenue. The corner of Seventh Avenue and 42nd Street has a seven-story cylindrical "rotunda", which was intended to attract pedestrians to the retail base. The rotunda is made of cast stone and architectural terracotta. The main entrance to the building is through the lobby, accessed from the middle of the Seventh Avenue facade. The lobby wall originally contained view of the fourth-floor newsroom. The lobby on Seventh Avenue was redesigned with a triple-height glass wall. The glass wall contains a screen that is intended to refract light from other parts of Times Square. According to William Rudin of Rudin Management, the lobby was redesigned as a "sanctuary from all that's happening outside".

The windows allow natural light to illuminate the offices, though it also serves to deflect much of the heat energy. According to Robert Fox of Fox & Fowle, the walls blocked heat so efficiently that, when considering the amount of heat generated by the building's occupants, the building did not need a heating system even during winter. The walls deflect the ultraviolet rays from sunlight.

==== Signage ====
William Rudin had initially been opposed to exterior signage on 3 Times Square's facade. He said he changed his mind after seeing that the signage on the Morgan Stanley Building, several blocks north, had increased the value of that building. Furthermore, the New York state government required the building to contain at least 14,000 square feet (1,300 m^{2}) of signage. Ultimately, 3 Times Square was designed with approximately 34,000 square feet (3,200 m^{2}) of signage. (Note: The building has 33,938 square feet (3,152.9 m^{2}) of signage. Rudin had given a different figure of 36,000 square feet (3,300 m^{2}).) There were originally supposed to be numerous news zippers on the facade, like those at One Times Square, but Fox & Fowle ultimately decided to use full-screen displays rather than zippers. The signs were designed by Edwin Schlossberg's firm, though George Stonbely helped make the signs. Advertising agency R/GA designed the programming for the signage.

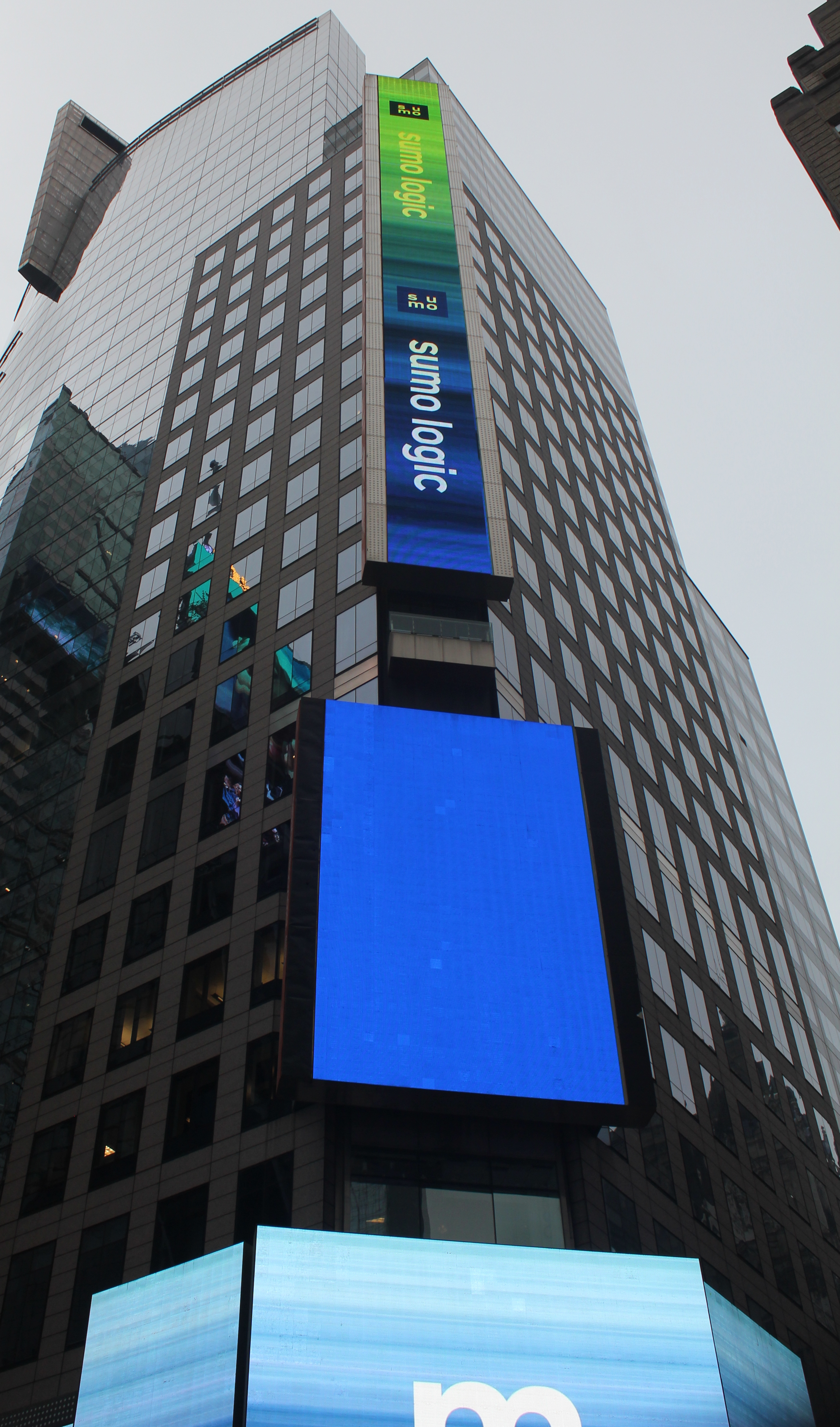
Reuters's sign on Seventh Avenue and 43rd Street

Reuters and subsidiary Instinet were allocated 15,169 square feet (1,409.2 m^{2}) of signage. The Reuters sign, a 14-story-tall display at the corner of Seventh Avenue and 43rd Street, is composed of 14 panels. Near street level is a horizontal "crossbar" with nine screens just above the base. On the corner, above the "crossbar", is a screen measuring 28 by 46 feet (8.5 by 14.0 m); a balcony, originally designed for Instinet's president; and a vertical sign, measuring 13 by 169 feet (4.0 by 51.5 m). The Reuters signage has 5.6 million LEDs and was used to display graphics, financial information, and other data. Rudin rented out another 12,769 square feet (1,186.3 m^{2}) of signage. Some 6,000 square feet (560 m^{2}) was for Prudential Financial, which had funded the project. (Note: A press release cited a figure of 5,000 square feet (460 m^{2}) for Prudential.) Prudential's sign is placed at Seventh Avenue and 42nd Street and consists of five types of illumination. It had a logo measuring 40 feet (12 m) high as well as Prudential's name on a banner measuring 120 feet (37 m) wide. An additional sign for Chase Bank, measuring 127 feet (39 m) wide, was installed on the corner "rotunda" in 2004.

=== Mechanical features ===
Rudin and Reuters had developed 3 Times Square with green building features in part because it was eligible for a green-building tax credit passed in 2000. 3 Times Square is designed to reduce energy consumption by 30% compared to an office building of similar size. The Rudin family initially decided against installing fuel cells or photovoltaic panels in the building, as had been used at Fox & Fowle's previous design for 4 Times Square. (Note: Architectural writer Robert A. M. Stern erroneously stated that 3 Times Square had two fuel cells of 400 kilowatts (540 hp) each, but The New York Times specifies that the fuel cells are at 4 Times Square.) The building was designed so it could collect power from fuel cells or PV panels if they were installed in the future. There are five generators on the roof, each capable of 750 kilowatts (1,010 hp), for powering Reuters's offices in case of emergencies. An additional generator powers the building's main mechanical systems during emergencies.

The heating plant includes two absorption chillers. The building is cooled by electric- and gas-powered cooling units, which can be activated or deactivated based on electrical rates. The coolers consists of two 650-ton gas chillers and two 1,350-ton electric chillers, as well as water-side economizers. There is also central air-handling equipment on each story. In addition, the office stories' ventilation systems contain filters with a minimum efficiency reporting value of 15, making them among the most efficient filters on the MERV scale. Air filters have been included in the building since its original design.

=== Interior ===
Structurally, the underlying rock is capable of supporting 40 short tons per square foot (390 t/m^{2}), which obviated the need for caissons in the foundation. There is about 79,000 square feet (7,300 m^{2}) or 80,000 square feet (7,400 m^{2}) of retail space at the base. The retail space includes a lower concourse level, as well as the first three above-ground stories of the building. Because the retail space in 3 Times Square is smaller than in its predecessor building, the Rudin family decided to market the space toward large tenants. On the 43rd Street side, the Rudin family also acquired a building facing 43rd Street, which had office space and a driveway for the adjacent New Victory Theatre. New loading docks were built with 3 Times Square's construction, one of which was allocated for the New Victory. The lobby has security checkpoints with turnstiles.

The office stories each have 28 to 35 thousand square feet (2,600 to 3,300 m^{2}) of space. The floors of 3 Times Square are arranged around a mechanical core with elevators, stairways, and other functions. The elevators contain a destination dispatch system, wherein passengers request their desired floor before entering the cab, and touchless entry points. Generally, each story has a slab-to-slab height of 13.33 feet (4.06 m) as measured between the floor and ceiling. The 2nd and 4th stories are 18 feet (5.5 m) tall; the 3rd, 5th, 6th, and 7th stories are 14 feet (4.3 m); and the 8th and 9th stories are 16 feet (4.9 m).

The ceilings contain the HVAC and lighting systems, allowing the office stories to be arranged flexibly. Reuters originally occupied 21 stories and arranged its offices in a modular layout. The eighth story originally contained an Instinet trading floor with 200 workstations across 22,000 square feet (2,000 m^{2}). Two broadcast studios for Reuters were designed for the lower stories. and a newsroom was on the 19th story. Rudin and Reuters also installed high-speed communications wires connecting the building's offices. As part of the 2021 renovation, an amenity space was built on the 16th floor facing Times Square. The space has a lounge, cafe, dining area, and an event space for up to 220 people, as well as a fitness center. A library is also planned for the space. Outdoor spaces are also present at the eighth, 20th, and 22nd stories.

== History ==
=== Planning ===
==== Early plans ====
The Empire State Development Corporation (ESDC), an agency of the New York state government, had proposed redeveloping the area around a portion of West 42nd Street in 1981. Four towers designed by Philip Johnson and John Burgee were to be built around 42nd Street's intersections with Broadway and Seventh Avenue, including one at the present-day site of 3 Times Square. (Note: The sites were: Northwest corner of 42nd Street and Seventh Avenue: now 3 Times Square; Northeast corner of 42nd Street and Broadway: now 4 Times Square; Southwest corner of 42nd Street and Seventh Avenue: now 5 Times Square; South side of 42nd Street between Seventh Avenue and Broadway: now 7 Times Square (Times Square Tower)) The tower on 3 Times Square's site would have been 29 stories tall with 705,000 square feet (65,500 m^{2}). These towers would have been redeveloped by George Klein of Park Tower Realty, though the Prudential Insurance Company of America joined the project in 1986. In 1988, the ESDC convinced Prudential to give up part of the 3 Times Square site to New 42nd Street so the New Victory Theater could have a delivery entrance. Furthermore, as part of the West Midtown special zoning district created in 1982, the New York City government had allowed new buildings in Times Square to be developed with an increased floor area ratio. To ensure the area would not be darkened at nightfall, the city passed zoning regulations that encouraged developers to add large, bright signs on their buildings.

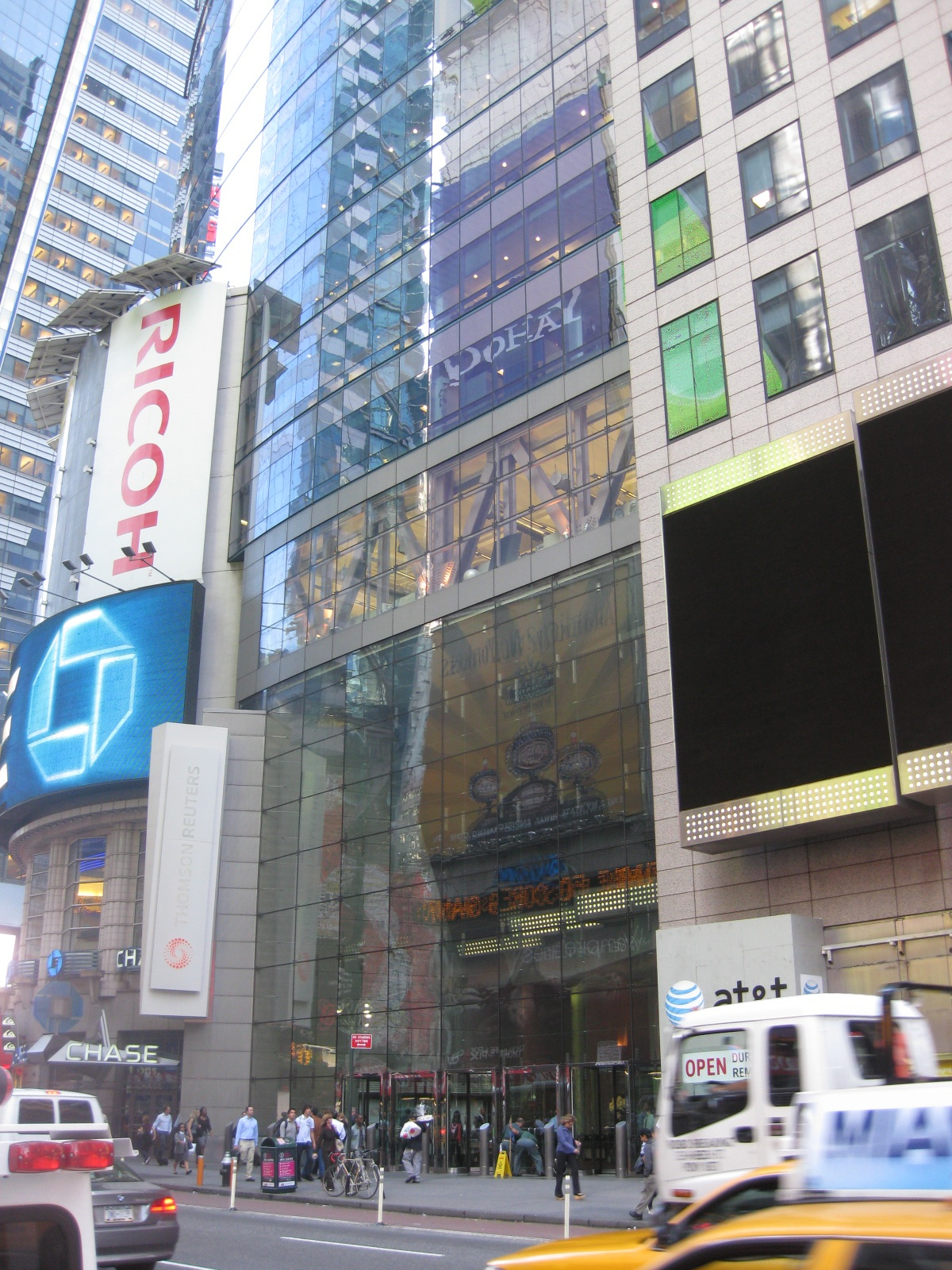
Main entrance at the center of the Seventh Avenue facade

The Durst Organization opposed the redevelopment for 15 years, citing concerns over the subsidies that were to be given to the developers, which in turn would decrease the value of the Dursts' buildings. The Dursts' opposition, along with Prudential and Park Tower's inability to secure tenants for the proposed buildings, led government officials to allow Prudential and Park Tower to postpone the project in 1992. By then, Prudential had spent $300 million on condemning the sites through eminent domain. The partners retained the right to develop the sites in the future, and the ESDC's zoning guidelines remained in effect. In exchange for being permitted to delay construction of the sites until 2002, Prudential and Park Tower were compelled to add stores and install large signage on the existing buildings. The Rialto was thus renovated in 1995 as part of the interim plan for Times Square.

Klein ceded decision-making power for the sites to Prudential, which decided to exit the real-estate market altogether, selling off all four sites. Prudential and Klein dissolved their partnership in 1996. The same year, Douglas Durst acquired the site at the northeast corner of Broadway and 42nd Street, and he developed 4 Times Square there.

==== Reuters proposal ====
Prudential decided to market the three other sites after the successful development of 4 Times Square. In March 1997, Prudential indicated its intent to sell the sites' development rights or lease the sites to developers. Among the interested developers was Durst, who was negotiating for the northwest corner of 42nd Street and Seventh Avenue. Durst had hired Fox & Fowle, architects of 4 Times Square, to design an office building of up to 800,000 square feet (74,000 m^{2}). He was discussing with news agency Reuters, publisher Ziff Davis, and financial firm Morgan Stanley as possible anchor tenants for a building on that site. Klein started discussing a possible partnership with Durst on the development of the site, but Durst's proposal did not succeed.

By August 1997, Reuters had become the primary contender for the site, planning a headquarters there. The company was looking to consolidate over 1,800 workers from 13 locations in New York City. The following month, Reuters enlisted Rudin Management as its development partner. The building was to be 32 stories high and contain 855,000 square feet (79,400 m^{2}). (Note: One New York Times article cited the building's area as 844,000 square feet (78,400 m^{2}), contrary to other articles from the time.) The Rudin family had agreed to lease out some space that Reuters would not occupy. Reuters planned to occupy 506,000 square feet (47,000 m^{2}), while Rudin planned to lease out about 330,000 square feet (31,000 m^{2}) of unused office space and 80,000 square feet (7,400 m^{2}) of retail space. The development would make Reuters one of several large companies to build their U.S. headquarters in Manhattan. After the Rudin family and Reuters signed an agreement in October 1997, they realized the site was too small to accommodate an 855,000-square-foot building under zoning law. Having failed to convince Prudential to transfer development rights from a nearby site, Rudin and Reuters paid New 42nd Street $2.8 million for an adjacent four-story building on 43rd Street. The Rudin family and Reuters signed a modified agreement in February 1998.

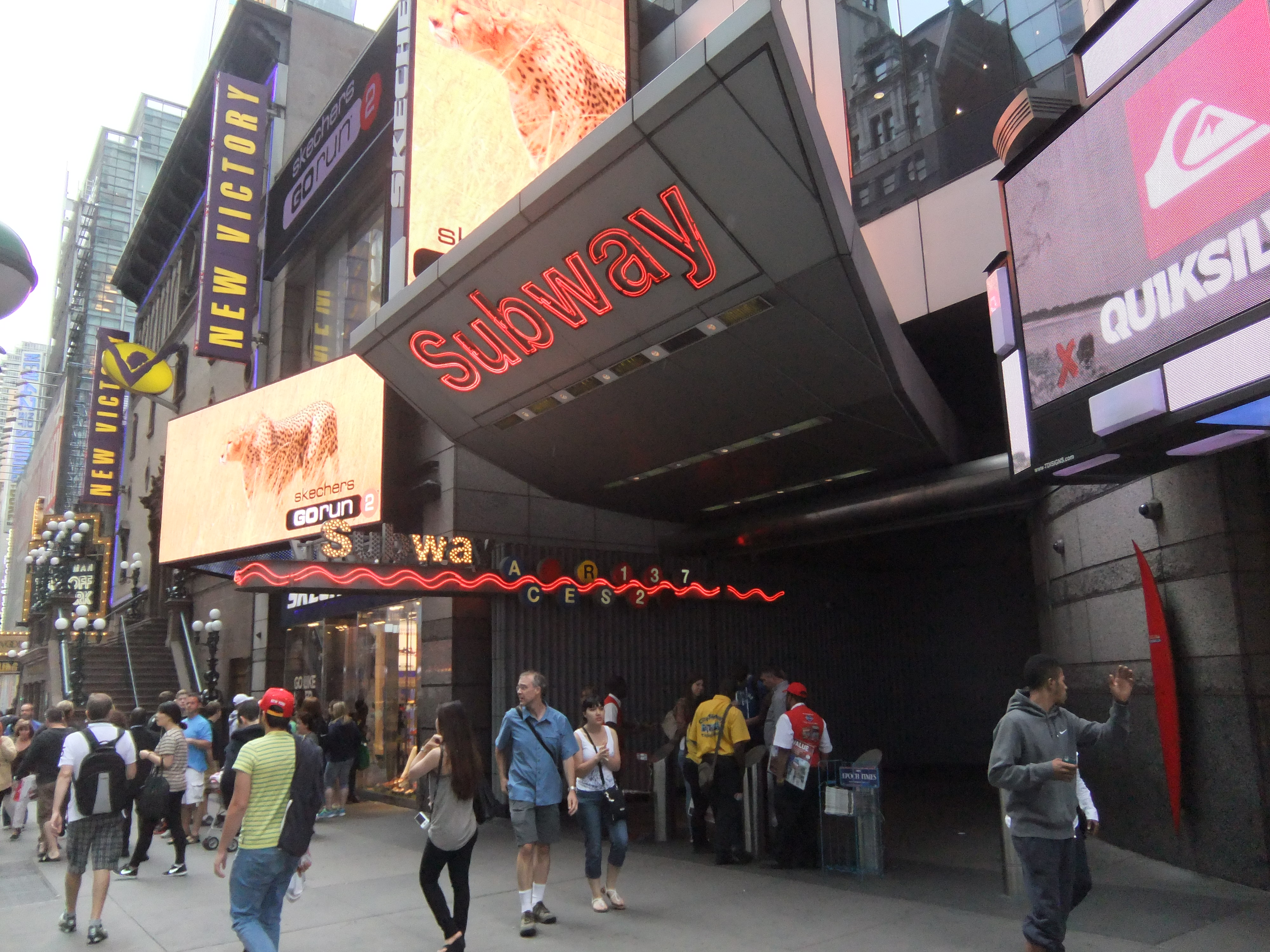
Rudin Management paid $1.3 million so it would not have to add escalators to 3 Times Square's subway entrance.

The administration of mayor Rudy Giuliani agreed to give Reuters tax exemptions to encourage the development of the $400 million headquarters. This consisted of a $12.5 million, 20-year sales tax exemption on materials and equipment, as well as a $13.5 million exemption, to be granted if Reuters created new jobs during this time. The tax breaks were controversial, with one critic saying that Times Square had become the "corporate welfare capital of the world". As part of 3 Times Square's construction, Rudin Management was compelled to add a new entrance to the Times Square–42nd Street station, with a stairwell at least 12 feet (3.7 m) wide, as well as two escalators. In April 1998, the Metropolitan Transportation Authority (MTA) allowed the Rudin family to be exempt from adding escalators in exchange for a $1.3 million payment. In addition, the MTA would pay for a canopy above the entrance for $250,000. An MTA inspector subsequently alleged that the Rudins should have paid $4 million to $5.9 million for not including the escalators.

=== Construction ===
By early 1998, demolition of buildings on the site of the Reuters Building was underway. Tishman Construction, the main contractor for the building, subcontracted the substructure work to Urban Foundation. The work consisted of excavating the 32,000-square-foot (3,000 m^{2}) site to a depth of 32 feet (9.8 m). The basements of the old buildings on the site, which extended 10 feet (3.0 m) deep, were removed. The excavation process was complicated by the presence of two nearby historic structures, the subway tunnels, and the three streets bordering the site. While the underlying rock was strong enough that it could bear the weight of the building, Urban Foundation reinforced the foundations of the nearby buildings with concrete.

A groundbreaking ceremony for the building occurred on January 11, 1999. 3 Times Square and its three neighboring developments would collectively add almost 4 million square feet (370,000 m^{2}) of office space. All four projects were being marketed with a Times Square address, which until the early 1990s had not been popular in the city's real estate market. At the time, rents for commercial space around Times Square were increasing drastically. Prudential loaned $270 million to Rudin for the building's construction. By August 1999, the building's steel superstructure was being erected, despite a shortage in skilled ironworkers citywide. Chinese "sidewalk artists" hung their portraits on the plywood construction fence that surrounded the site, prompting the New York City Police Department to clear the artists from the sidewalk every night.

The building topped out on December 10, 1999. The next month, the surrounding section of Seventh Avenue was closed temporarily after a debris and a piece of wood fell from the construction site. Reuters ultimately expanded its space to 625,000 square feet (58,100 m^{2}). The vacant office space was taken by Bain & Company, which leased 50,000 square feet (4,600 m^{2}) in February 2000, and the Bank of Montreal (BMO), which leased 102,000 square feet (9,500 m^{2}) that June. After BMO's lease, all of the office space was signed for. About 50,000 square feet of retail space and 15,000 square feet (1,400 m^{2}) of signs remained to be leased.

=== Usage ===
==== Reuters offices ====
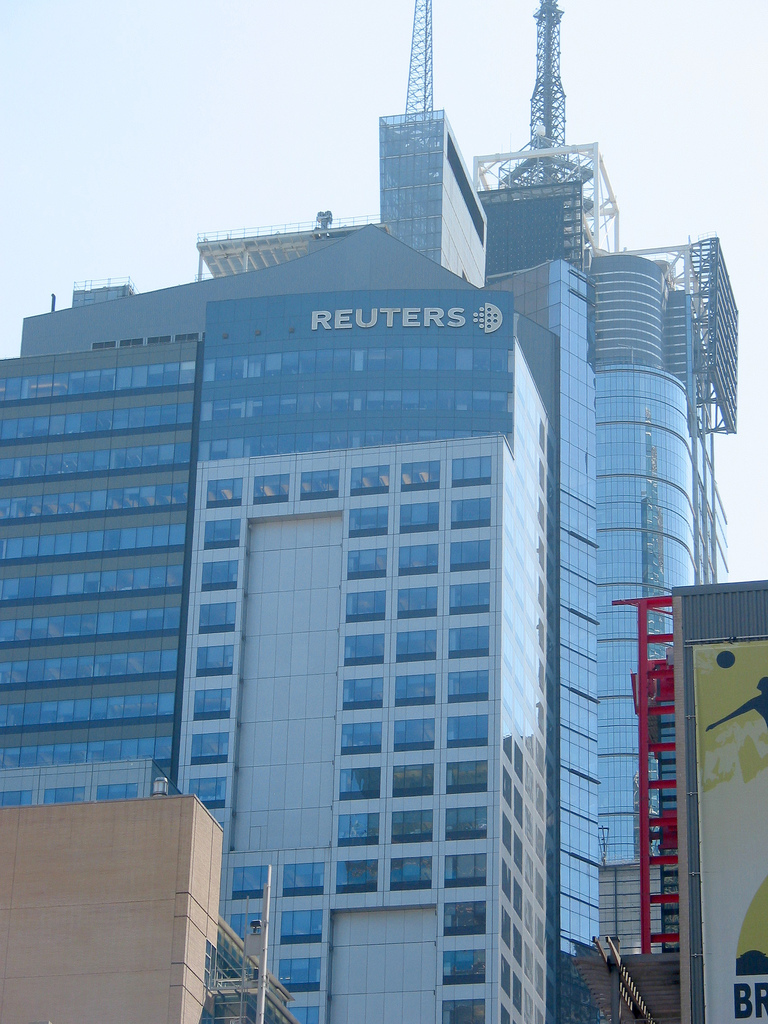
Western facade

The Instinet trading floor opened on May 7, 2001, with 700 employees. Reuters opened its 19th-floor newsroom two weeks later on May 22. The Reuters headquarters officially opened on June 4, 2001, with speeches from former U.S. Treasury secretary Lawrence Summers and former UN ambassador Richard Holbrooke. In addition to Instinet's employees, Reuters had 1,100 workers at the building. Despite the September 11 attacks in Lower Manhattan shortly after the building's opening, Chase Bank took some retail space by the end of 2001. After the attacks, Instinet decided to open offices in New Jersey. Though Instinet still occupied 300,000 square feet (28,000 m^{2}) at 3 Times Square, Reuters took some of Instinet's space. Shoe store Skechers had signed for another retail unit by mid-2002, and Europa Cafe also took some retail space. The Prudential sign at Seventh Avenue and 42nd Street started illuminating in December 2002.

Not long after the Reuters Building opened, Instinet indicated it would downsize its staff and sublet 100 to 200 thousand square feet (9,300 to 18,600 m^{2}) at the building. Subsequently, six of Instinet's floor were listed for sublease in May 2003. Among the other tenants were pharmaceutical company Eyetech, as well as consulting firm FTI Consulting, the latter of which subleased part of its space to brokerage firm Integro. There was controversy in October 2003 when Reuters refused to air an advertisement by the Methodist Episcopal Church, though Reuters ultimately reversed its policy prohibiting religious advertising. The next year, Chase added a sign around the rotunda at Seventh Avenue and 42nd Street. Reuters announced a partnership with Nasdaq in 2006, in which companies could display advertisements across both 3 Times Square's northeast corner and Nasdaq MarketSite across the street at 4 Times Square. Advertisers could choose between splitting their advertisement across the two buildings, running the same ad across both buildings, or displaying different messages on either building.

Following the September 11 attacks, Reuters had placed 13 planters on the sidewalk to protect the building against car bombs. The planters were removed in late 2006 after counterterrorism experts said the planters could turn into projectiles during vehicular attacks. Reuters merged in 2007 with Canadian media company Thomson Corporation to form Thomson Reuters, and some Thomson offices relocated to 3 Times Square. The lower stories' retail space was taken up by an AT&T phone store, as well as temporary pop-up stores in the 2010s. After Bain & Company announced its plans to relocate in late 2013, it subleased the space to BMO. IThomson Reuters began vacating about 401,000 square feet (37,300 m^{2}) of the building in April 2018, and later subleased some of its space to Kind Snacks, a manufacturer of protein bars and health foods. By October 2020, Thomson Reuters was looking to sell its 50 percent stake in the building, which it co-owned with Rudin Management. With Reuters's stake listed at $800 per square foot ($8,600/m^{2}), this placed the building's valuation at about $700 million.

==== Renovation and subsequent leases ====
Rudin Management announced in April 2021 that it would be renovating the building for $25 million. Rudin had hired FXCollaborative (which had been renamed from Fox & Fowle) to redesign the lobby and add a 16th-story amenity area. Rudin also hired Cushman & Wakefield to market the space. The renovation came after BMO and FTI vacated large amounts of space in the building. In January 2022, Touro College and University System leased 243,305 square feet (22,603.8 m^{2}) on the third to ninth floors, allowing the college to consolidate seven of its schools at one location. As part of the lease, a separate entrance was built at Seventh Avenue and 43rd Street, and staircases, classrooms, laboratories, and meeting areas were built within the college's space. Later that year in June, Rudin and Thomson Reuters obtained $415 million in refinancing from a group of lenders led by JPMorgan Chase, with Bank of America and M&T Bank participating, to fund the renovation and leasing costs. Touro leased another 66,000 square feet (6,100 m^{2}) on the 10th and 11th floors in March 2023, giving it about 309,400 square feet (28,740 m^{2}) across nine floors; eight of its schools were housed there. In June 2023, Thomson Reuters subsidiary West Publishing renewed its lease for 46,105 square feet (4,283.3 m^{2}) on the 17th floor and part of the 18th floor for five years. In August 2026, JAMS signed an 11-year lease for 55,335 square feet (5,140.8 m^{2}) on the 29th and 30th floors, relocating its New York Resolution Center from 620 Eighth Avenue.

== Critical reception ==
When the building plans were announced in 1998, Herbert Muschamp wrote for The New York Times that the design "is decent, well mannered and deferential, and if you were a gentleman, you would tip your hat." Several architectural critics pointed out the use of masonry on some parts of the building and glass elsewhere. William Morgan wrote for Oculus: "...the Reuters building is too fussy, too busy, and laden with too many historical references. But it is also a lot of fun; glitzy is appropriate here." Joseph Giovannini of New York magazine expressed his appreciation for the design, saying that "the Reuters Building does not strive to be a perfect whole" but was instead influenced by its setting. Giovannini likened it to a "fraternal twin" of 4 Times Square, adding that 3 Times Square "fits seamlessly here because Fox & Fowle has opened the normally closed skyscraper form to a part of the city that’s already layered in short and tall, new and old buildings". Karrie Jacobs of New York magazine also likened the building to 4 Times Square.

Some critics viewed the mixture of facades as a negative attribute. Paul Goldberger of The New Yorker wrote that the building "sometimes seems like a bunch of unintegrated pieces". Ned Cramer wrote for Architecture magazine in 2000: "What they built is more of an identity crisis—a mish-mash of forms and materials utterly lacking in finesse or wit or higher meaning." Cramer concluded that describing the building as a "skyscraper" would be a "diminishment of its predecessors".
