= Nasdaq MarketSite =

LED video display and studio in New York City

Coordinates: 40.756327°N 73.985978°W

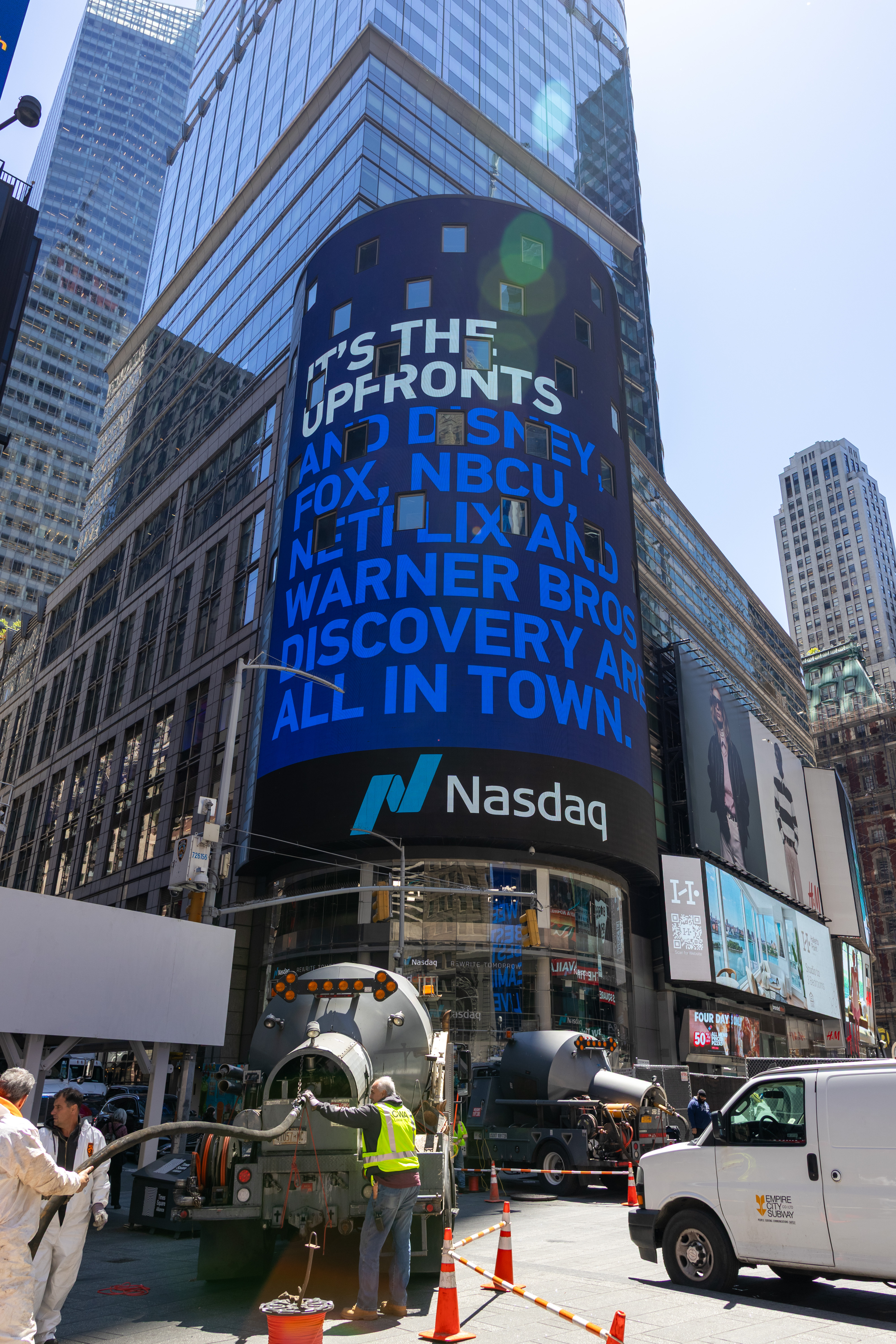
Nasdaq MarketSite (Times Square, New York City) during the day

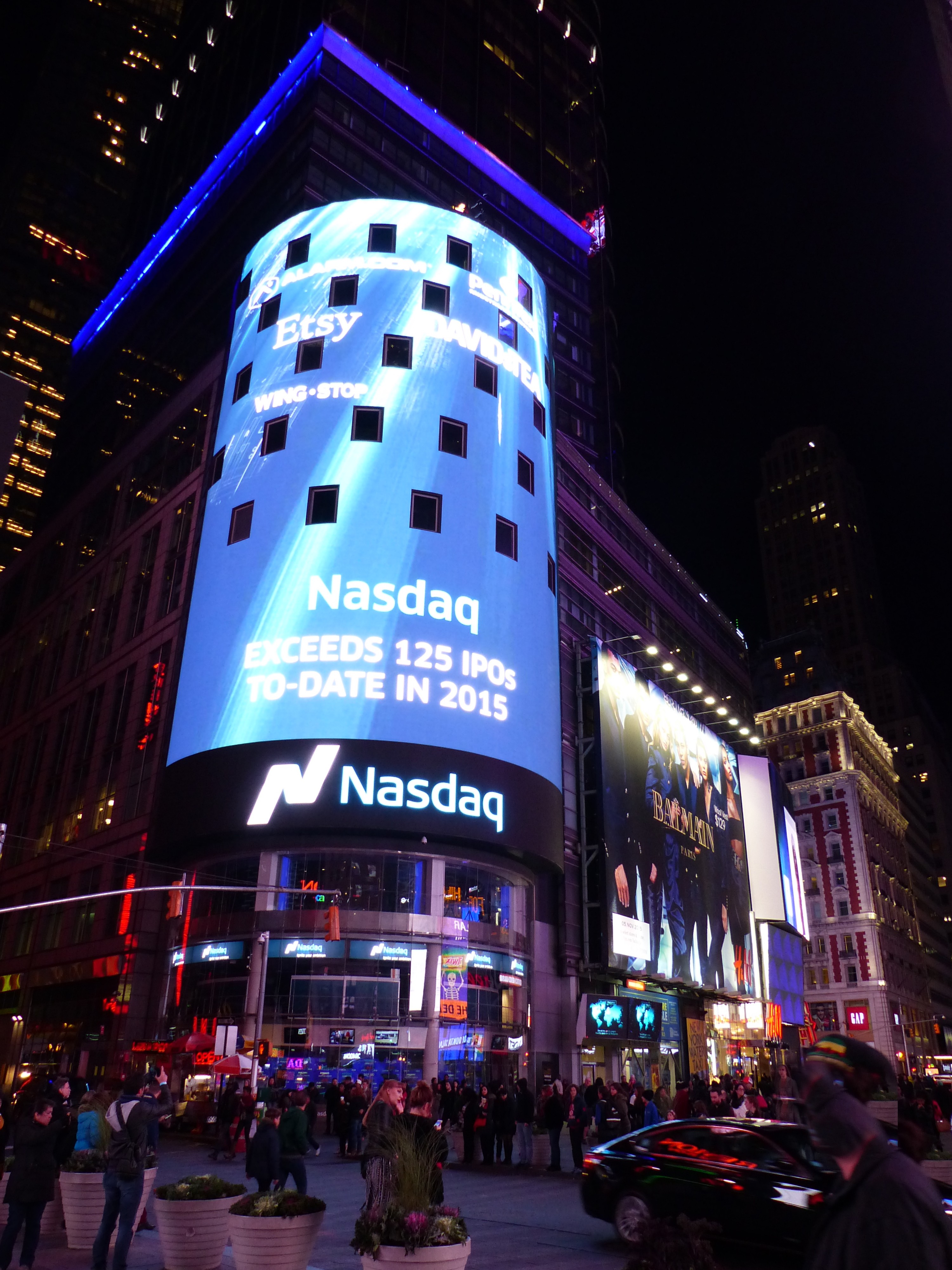
Nasdaq MarketSite (Times Square, New York City) at night

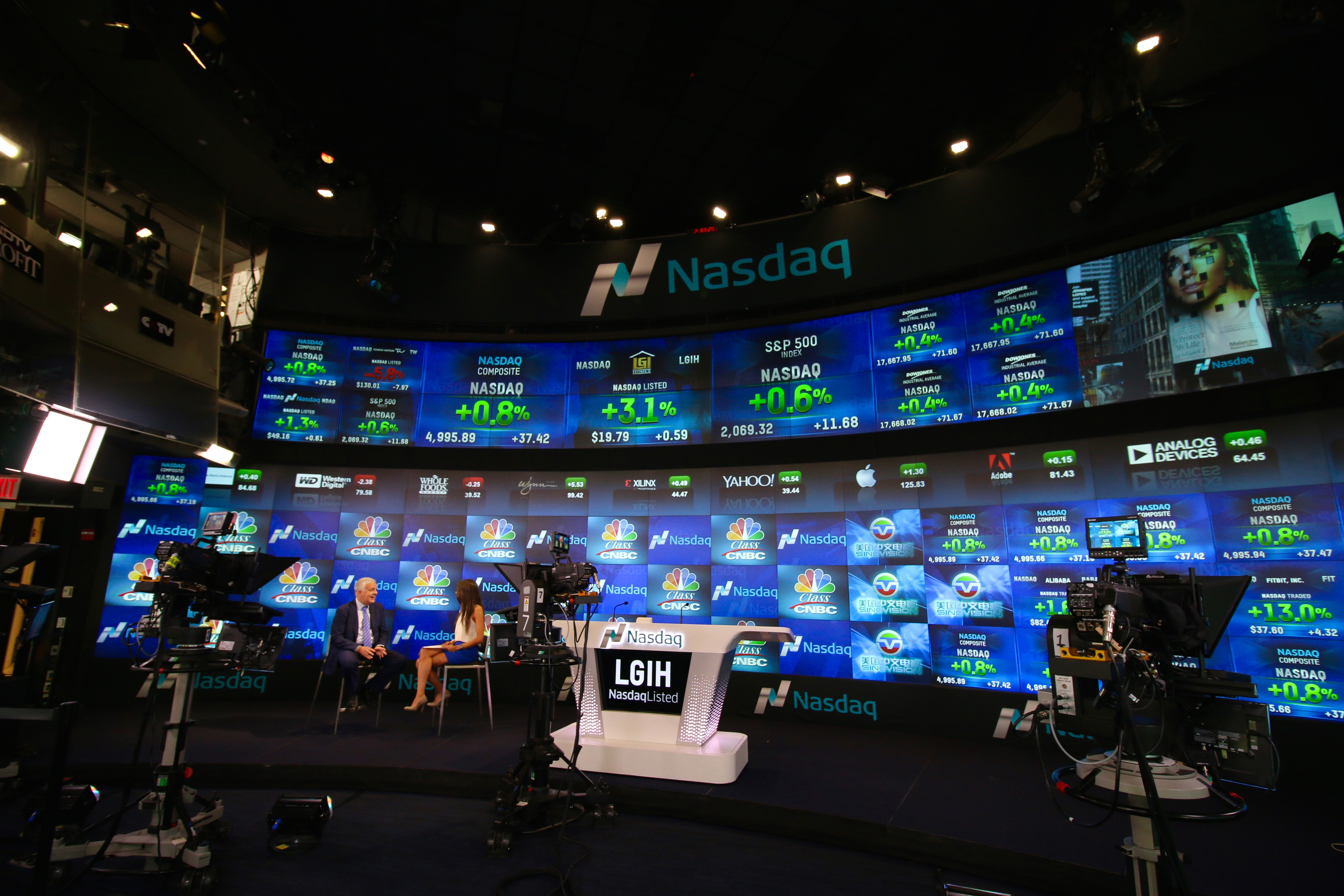
Financial reporters from major television news networks deliver live updates from the MarketSite Studio

The Nasdaq MarketSite (or simply MarketSite) is the commercial marketing presence of the Nasdaq stock exchange. Located at Times Square in the Midtown Manhattan neighborhood of New York City, it occupies the northwest corner at the base of the 4 Times Square skyscraper.

The exterior wall of the eight-story cylindrical tower includes an LED video display that provides market quotes, financial news, and advertisements. Einhorn Yaffee Prescott designed Nasdaq MarketSite's 28,500-square-foot (2,650 m^{2}) space inside, which contains two broadcast studios and originally had a second-floor exhibit called the "MarketSite Experience". MarketSite was built in 1999 and debuted on January 1, 2000.

== Description ==
=== Exterior ===
Nasdaq MarketSite is located at the northwest corner of 4 Times Square, facing Broadway to the west and 43rd Street to the north, along Times Square in the Midtown Manhattan neighborhood of New York City. It has an eight-story cylindrical facade. At street level is a three-story glass facade. The glass curtain wall was meant to allow clear views of the broadcast studios behind it. Above the studio, the facade consists of a giant LED display, variously cited as measuring 12,000 square feet (1,100 m^{2}) or 14,000 square feet (1,300 m^{2}). Measuring 120 feet (37 m) high, the display was the world's largest at the time of its completion. The display is allowed because 4 Times Square is exempt from zoning rules regarding signs.

The LED display is made of about 8,200 or 8,400 panels manufactured by Saco Smart Vision. The panels, in turn, are powered by over 800 units behind the screen, which are similar to the size of a shoebox. The LEDs are spaced as closely as 20 millimeters (0.79 in) apart. With over 18 million LEDs, the display can show information at a computer display standard of 1280x1824. The panels are 18 inches (460 mm) thick. As designed, the sign was lit every day from 7 a.m. to 1 a.m., displaying advertisements, videos, news broadcasts, and financial and market information. Companies are identified by logos rather than their ticker symbols.

The display is interrupted by thirty square windows. The windows are arranged into five rows, which illuminate a portion of Condé Nast's space. The panels are covered with translucent coating, but water seepage from the windows can sometimes damage the display. There is a 3-foot-wide (0.91 m) catwalk and a ventilation space behind the display, which created an effect resembling a tunnel. At 4 Times Square's opening, Nasdaq leased the sign space from the Durst Organization for $2 million a year.

=== Interior ===
Einhorn Yaffee Prescott designed Nasdaq MarketSite's 28,500-square-foot (2,650 m^{2}) space. The space had a 72-seat auditorium, a public exhibit area, and a pair of broadcast studios below the large LED sign. MarketSite's ground floor contains a broadcast studio with a wall of 96 monitors, measuring 20 feet (6.1 m) tall and broadcasting information about stocks and the market. The wall of screens consists of seventy-two screens measuring 40 inches (1,000 mm) across and twenty-four screens measuring 50 inches (1,300 mm) across. Reporters could use images from multiple screens to supplement their broadcasts. The ground floor also has an arc of windows looking out onto Times Square.

The main floor of the broadcast studio has four electronically controlled cameras; the reporters' booths in the mezzanine above the main studio have six additional cameras. The broadcast studios are illuminated by fixtures on the studio's mezzanine level, as well as fluorescent lights in the reporter's booths. Fluorescent lights were also added to the offices of major television networks within the facility. Speakers are built into the studio's video wall, and the studio itself can accommodate five live broadcasts at once. When it opened in 2000, MarketSite was also capable of displaying high-definition video, even though this was not a popular video format at the time.

An exhibit on the second floor was designed as the "MarketSite Experience", displaying items about MarketSite's history. Visitors rode an elevator from the building's lobby and entered the Information Stream Tunnel, an interactive exhibit that has video displays depicting a "flow" of data using neon lights. Afterward, a passageway sloped up to the Global Connections Theatre, where visitors watched an eight-minute short film about Nasdaq, set in various locations around the world. Visitors were then directed to the MarketSite Game Experience, which contained twelve touchscreen kiosks with an interactive stock-market game, as well as six kiosks where visitors could search Nasdaq's website. The final part of the MarketSite Experience was the "Parting Shot", which took pictures of visitors' faces and displayed them on the large LED sign.

== History ==
The original idea for MarketSite and the data visualizations and graphics came from Enock Interactive (now Percepted) in New York City. The project was 10 years in the making prior to the Times Square launch. The initial installation of the MarketSite was in Nasdaq's former location at Whitehall Street in Lower Manhattan.

In 1998, Nasdaq leased some space for a marketing center and TV studio at 4 Times Square, which would replace its facility in Lower Manhattan. Nasdaq proposed a large sign on the northwest corner, though it did not show plans for the sign to Condé Nast, the building's flagship tenant, until January 1999. Condé Nast objected to the sign, citing a clause in its 500-page lease. According to Condé Nast, the sign would block the windows of its art department and that it protruded too far from the facade. In response, Nasdaq said the sign was within the terms of its own lease and that, in any case, Condé Nast's graphic-arts department did not need natural light. The dispute was decided in an arbitration proceeding, where an arbitrator ruled in favor of Nasdaq. The display ultimately cost $37 million and started illuminating on December 28, 1999.

Nasdaq announced a partnership with Reuters in 2006, in which companies could display advertisements across both MarketSite and the Reuters Building at 3 Times Square across the street. Advertisers could choose between splitting their advertisement across the two buildings, running the same ad across both buildings, or displaying different messages on either building.

In 2018, Nasdaq signed a 145,000-square-foot (13,500 m^{2}) lease at 4 Times Square, extending the MarketSite lease while also moving the company's global headquarters to 4 Times Square. Nasdaq expanded to 180,000 square feet (17,000 m^{2}) at 4 Times Square in May 2019.
