= 4 Times Square =

Office skyscraper in Manhattan, New York

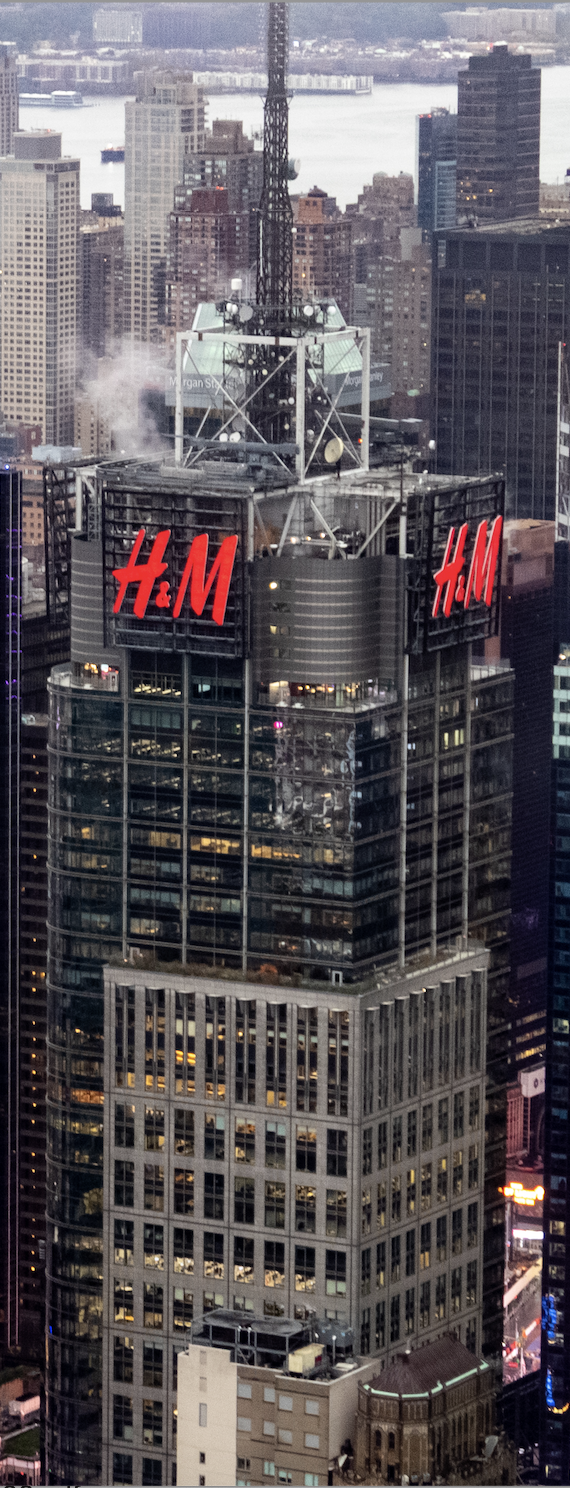
- 4 Times Square in 2025
- Alternative names: Condé Nast Building; H&M Tower

General information
- Status: Completed
- Type: Commercial offices
- Location: 151 West 42nd Street & 1472 Broadway, Manhattan, New York
- Coordinates: 40°45′22″N 73°59′09″W
- Construction started: 1996; 30 years ago
- Completed: 1999; 27 years ago
- Opening: June 21, 1999; 27 years ago
- Owner: New York City Economic Development Corporation
- Operator: Durst Organization

Height
- Antenna spire: 1,118 ft (341 m)
- Roof: 809 ft (247 m)

Technical details
- Floor count: 48 (usable stories only); 52 (including mechanical stories)
- Floor area: 1,600,000 sq ft (150,000 m^{2})

Design and construction
- Architect: Fox & Fowle Architects
- Developer: Durst Organization
- Structural engineer: WSP Cantor Seinuk; Cosentini Associates
- Main contractor: Tishman Construction

4 Times Square (also known as 151 West 42nd Street, One Five One, or the H&M Tower; formerly the Condé Nast Building) is a 48-story skyscraper at Times Square in the Midtown Manhattan neighborhood of New York City, New York, U.S. Located at 1472 Broadway, between 42nd and 43rd Streets, the building measures 809 ft (247 m) tall to its roof and 1,118 ft (341 m) tall to its antenna. The building was designed by Fox & Fowle and developed by the Durst Organization. 4 Times Square, and the Bank of America Tower to the east, occupy an entire city block.

Fox & Fowle planned a masonry facade facing south and east, as well as a glass facade facing west and north. The northwest corner of the building's base contains the eight-story cylindrical facade of Nasdaq MarketSite, which includes a large LED sign. The top of 4 Times Square includes an antenna mast and four large illuminated signs on each side which read ‘H&M’. The building contains 1,600,000 sq ft (150,000 m^{2}) of floor space, much of which was originally taken by publishing company Condé Nast and law firm Skadden Arps. The lowest three stories contain retail space while the fourth story has a food hall for tenants, originally designed by Frank Gehry for Condé Nast. 4 Times Square is an early example of green design in commercial skyscrapers in the United States.

During the 1980s and early 1990s, Park Tower Realty and the Prudential Insurance Company of America had planned to develop a tower for the site as part of a wide-ranging redevelopment of West 42nd Street. After long opposing a tower there, Douglas Durst proposed an office building on the site in late 1995. Condé Nast and Skadden Arps leased the majority of the building in 1996, and the structure was finished in 1999. After Condé Nast and Skadden Arps moved out of the building during the 2010s, a variety of office tenants have occupied 4 Times Square. Several modifications have been made to the building after it opened, including an expansion of the antenna mast atop the building in 2003, as well as a renovation in the late 2010s.

== Site ==
4 Times Square is on the eastern side of Broadway, between 42nd Street and 43rd Street, at the southern end of Times Square in the Midtown Manhattan neighborhood of New York City, New York, U.S. The land lot is trapezoidal and covers 45,800 ft^{2} (4,250 m^{2}). The site has a frontage of 208.46 ft (63.54 m) on Broadway and a depth of 256.27 ft (78.11 m).

4 Times Square, as well as the Bank of America Tower and Stephen Sondheim Theatre to the east, comprise the entire city block. Other nearby locations include the Town Hall theater and the Chatwal New York hotel to the northeast, 1500 Broadway to the north, 1501 Broadway to the northwest, One Times Square and 3 Times Square to the west, Times Square Tower and 5 Times Square to the southwest, and the Knickerbocker Hotel and Bush Tower to the south. An entrance to the New York City Subway's Times Square–42nd Street station, served by the 1, 2, 3, 7, <7>, N, Q, R, W, and S trains, is across 42nd Street. There is also an entrance to the 42nd Street–Bryant Park/Fifth Avenue station, served by the 7, <7>, B, D, F, <F>, and M trains, less than a block east.

3, 4, and 5 Times Square and the Times Square Tower comprise a grouping of office buildings that were developed at Times Square's southern end in the late 1990s and early 2000s. The northern portion of 4 Times Square's site had been occupied by George M. Cohan's Theatre and the Fitzgerald Building before 1938, then by the Big Apple Theatre and a Nathan's Famous. The southern portion of the site had contained the Longacre Building. The Nathan's space was originally a Toffenetti restaurant, which opened in 1940. Designed by Walker & Gillette, the Toffenetti restaurant had 1,000 seats; the Nathan's opened in the Toffenetti building in 1968.

== Architecture ==
The building was designed by Fox & Fowle and developed by the Durst Organization. WSP Cantor Seinuk was the structural engineer, while Tishman Construction was the main contractor. Other companies involved with the project included wind consultant CPP Wind Engineering and Air Quality Consultants, elevator contractor Otis Worldwide, mechanical engineer Cosentini Associates, photovoltaic contractor Kiss + Cathcart Architects, lighting contractor Fisher Marantz Renfro Stone, and cladding contractor Heitmann & Associates. The New York City Economic Development Corporation owns the structure.

4 Times Square has 48 usable floors above ground, as well as two basement floors. Including mechanical stories atop the building, 4 Times Square is 52 stories tall. The building measures 809 ft (247 m) to its architectural tip and 1,118 ft (341 m) to the top of the antenna mast. The main roof is only 701 ft (214 m) high.

4 Times Square is one of the first examples of green design in commercial skyscrapers in the United States. The design incorporates many environmentally efficient features. In particular, Fox & Fowle had been chosen for its experience designing ecologically sustainable buildings. One of the building's original major tenants, publisher Condé Nast, had committed to designing its space to environmentally efficient standards (the other major tenant, law firm Skadden Arps, did not make a similar commitment). The building's high energy usage limits the extent of the energy savings; Suzanne Stephens wrote for Architectural Record that the inclusion of such features was "a little like opening up a smoke-enders clinic on a tobacco farm".

=== Form ===
The building is part of the 42nd Street Development Project and, thus, could bypass many city zoning rules such as those relating to floor area ratio (FAR). Bruce Fowle of Fox & Fowle estimated that the building had a FAR of 35, while The New York Times stated that the FAR was only 31. The massing of the building contains several setbacks, which were not mandated by zoning ordinances but were included to make the building's design fit in with its setting. The 43rd story contains a glass setback with a cavetto-shaped cornice. Stephens wrote that the building contained a combination of neo-Modernist and traditional design elements. While the building is divided into a base, shaft, and pinnacle similar to older skyscrapers, the design of the facade was more varied.

==== Antenna mast ====
If the building's antenna mast is included, the structure's total height is 1,118 ft (340.7 m). The original antenna mast measured 132 ft (40 m) and was built primarily for Clear Channel Communications (now iHeartMedia, Inc.) as a backup transmitter site. After the broadcast equipment atop the World Trade Center's towers was destroyed during the September 11 attacks in 2001, the main transmitters for radio stations WKTU, WNYC-FM, and WPAT-FM and the backup transmitter for WSKQ-FM were transferred to 4 Times Square. In 2003, the original installation was replaced with a 385 ft-tall (117 m) mast. This allowed WKTU, WNYC-FM, and WPAT-FM to build main transmitters at the Empire State Building without disrupting existing FM tenants there. The topmost antenna, designed for Univision's WFUT-TV, was removed in 2015 and replaced with a very high frequency (VHF) antenna for television station WJLP, bringing the mast to 416 feet (127 m) tall.

The mast includes five antennas. The topmost one is used by WJLP. The second-highest tier contains two antennas for ultra high frequency (UHF) broadcasts; the antenna serving UHF channels 40–60 is above that serving channels 24–45. (Note: These channels have since been taken out of broadcast television use.) Below that are two antennas for VHF broadcasts: one for low-VHF broadcasts and the other for FM radio stations. The antenna systems and mast were constructed by Andrew Corporation, Dielectric Communications, Shively Labs, and Electronics Research Inc. As of 2021, the mast at 4 Times Square is used as a primary site by FM radio stations WBGO, WKCR, WNYE, and WBAI. In addition, the mast has been used as a backup site for FM stations such as WKTU, WNYC, WPAT, WSKQ, WHTZ, WAXQ, WWPR, WLTW, and WCAA.

=== Facade ===
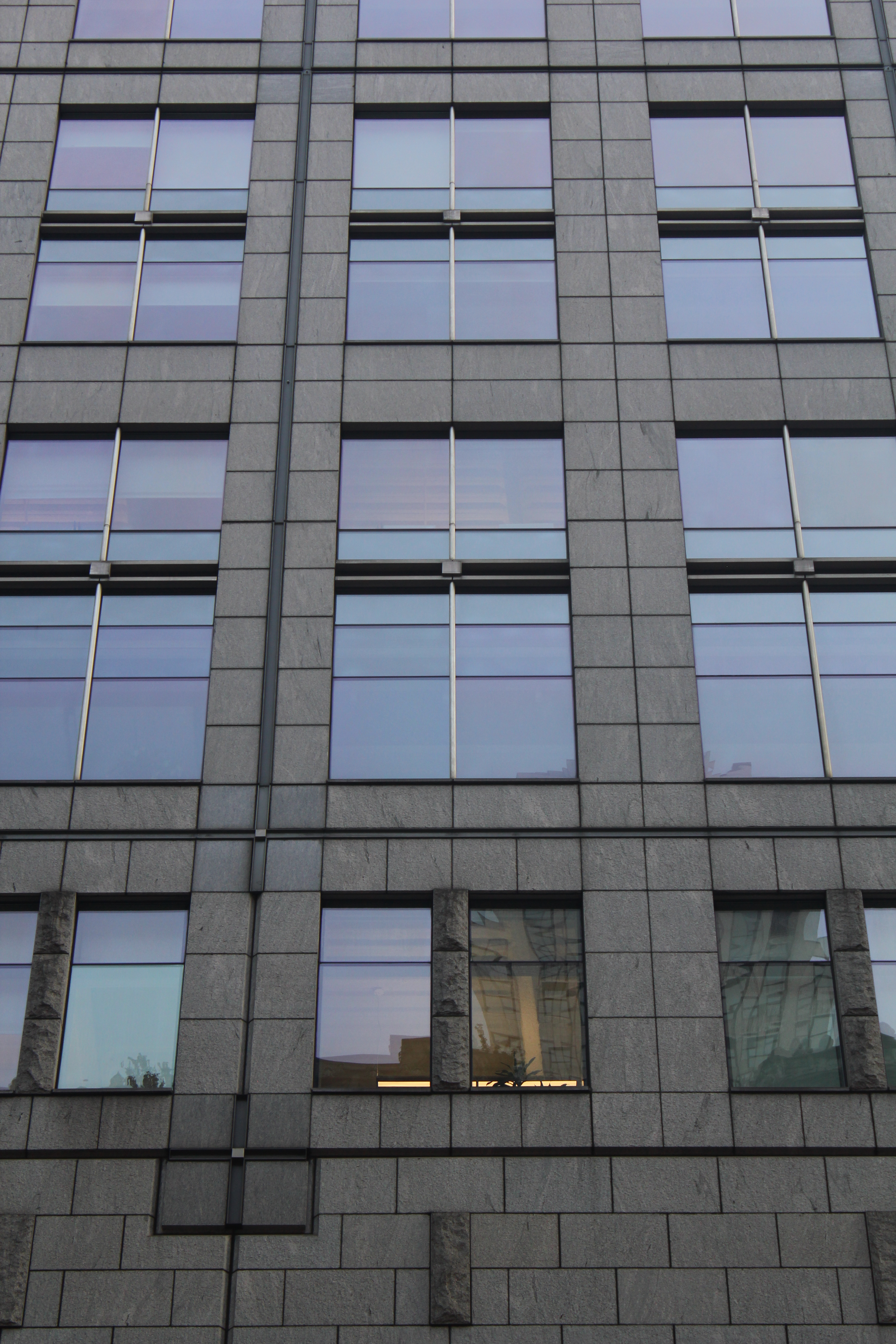
Detail of the masonry facade

Fox & Fowle planned a masonry facade, largely oriented south toward 42nd Street and east toward Bryant Park, as well as a glass facade, largely facing west toward Broadway and north toward 43rd Street. The arrangement was meant to fit in with the livelier character of Broadway and the more restrained character of 42nd Street and Bryant Park. This led multiple media sources to compare the facade to the two-faced god Janus. In general, the lower stories have low-reflective glass to increase transparency, while the upper stories have highly reflective glass that deflects heat.

The masonry facade wraps around much of the north, east, and south elevations. In a 1996 press release, Fox & Fowle described the character of the masonry facade as presenting "a more composed personality appropriate to the context of Midtown Manhattan". The offices are accessed from an entrance on 42nd Street, which is named One Five One after its street address of 151 West 42nd Street. The main entrance has a recessed glass wall and originally had an angled glass canopy, which complemented the curving ceiling of the lobby. The entrance originally contained glass doors and was flanked by stone blocks. The masonry facade has windows measuring 5 by 7 ft (1.5 by 2.1 m), larger than in typical office buildings. The large windows were meant to reduce the amount of electricity required for illuminating the offices.

The glass facade, which wraps around the west elevation and part of the south elevation, is designed to blend in with the surrounding signage. The glass facade contains green panels and is divided by vertical steel mullions. The west elevation on Broadway was designed with video screens, which cover 20,000 ft^{2} (1,900 m^{2}) and are mandated by the zoning law. There are ten signs, which could be rented to advertisers; when the building was constructed, the signs were projected to earn $7 million per year. The signs were included as part of Robert A. M. Stern's 42nd Street Now! master plan, which required a variety of lighting and signage for facades along Times Square.

The 37th through 43rd stories of the south and east elevations have photovoltaic (PV) panels. These were installed in place of some of the spandrels that separate windows on different floors. There are 208 panels covering 2,955 ft^{2} (274.5 m^{2}), half a percent of the facade's total area. While the panels can generate enough power for five or six houses, they only supply one-half of a percent of the total power needs of 4 Times Square. The PV modules are placed on a thin glass pane that is then laminated on both sides. The PV panels were included because they were inconspicuous and only cost $10/ft^{2} ($110/m^{2}) more than conventional spandrels. Originally, the architects had planned for 14,000 ft^{2} (1,300 m^{2}) of PV panels. Before deciding to use PV panels, Fox & Fowle had considered installing solar panels on the roof, as well as wind turbines. Douglas Durst of the Durst Organization said the panels were intended to indicate the building's energy-saving features, as the PV panels could be upgraded when the technology was more advanced.

==== Nasdaq MarketSite ====
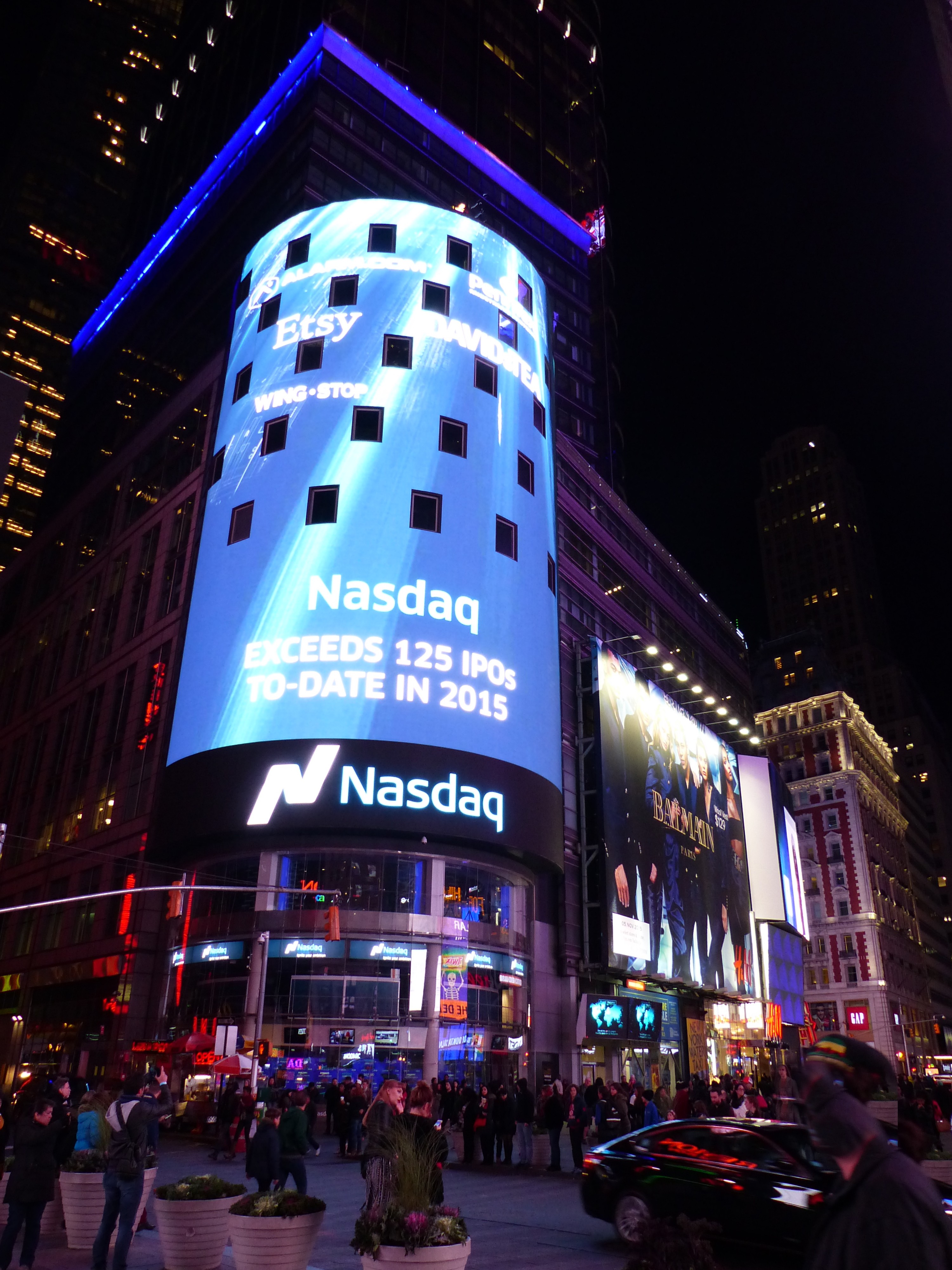
Nasdaq MarketSite at the bottom of the Condé Nast Building at night

The eight-story cylindrical facade of 4 Times Square's northwest corner, on Broadway and 43rd Street, contains Nasdaq MarketSite. The facade was part of the building's original design and was included before Nasdaq had leased the space. At street level is a three-story glass facade, which contains a view of the studio inside. Above the studio, the facade consists of a giant LED display, variously cited as measuring 12,000 ft^{2} (1,100 m^{2}) or 14,000 ft^{2} (1,300 m^{2}). The display was the world's largest at the time of its completion. The display is allowed because 4 Times Square is exempt from the zoning rules regarding signs.

The LED sign over the studio cost $37 million. The display can show information at a computer display standard of 1280x1824, and it has over 18 million LEDs. The display is made of about 8,200 or 8,400 panels, manufactured by Saco Smart Vision. It is 18 in (460 mm) thick and is interrupted by thirty square windows. The windows are arranged into five rows, which illuminate a portion of Condé Nast's space. There is a 3 ft-wide (0.91 m) catwalk and a ventilation space behind the display, creating a gap of about 5 ft (1.5 m) between the sign and the actual facade. At 4 Times Square's opening, Nasdaq leased the sign space from Durst for $2 million a year.

==== Top-story signs ====
The top of the building was originally ornamented with four signs, each measuring 60 by 60 ft (18 by 18 m) and displaying the address 4 Times Square. Unlike the signs at the base, the top stories' signs are not required by zoning. While modern New York City building code prohibits logos from being more than 25 ft (7.6 m) above the curb or occupying over 200 ft^{2} (19 m^{2}) on a blockfront, the top-story signs are protected because they are in the 42nd Street Development Project.

The panels were originally vacant, though Durst had sought to market them to tenants at $1 million a year. In 2000, after the building opened, panels with the name of wireless provider Teligent Telecom were installed on the top stories, measuring 70 by 70 ft (21 by 21 m). The signs were subsequently replaced by the number "4" during the mid-2000s. Since 2013, the top of the building has contained four illuminated panels with the name of clothing retailer H&M, a retail tenant at the base.

=== Mechanical and environmental features ===
==== Fuel cells ====
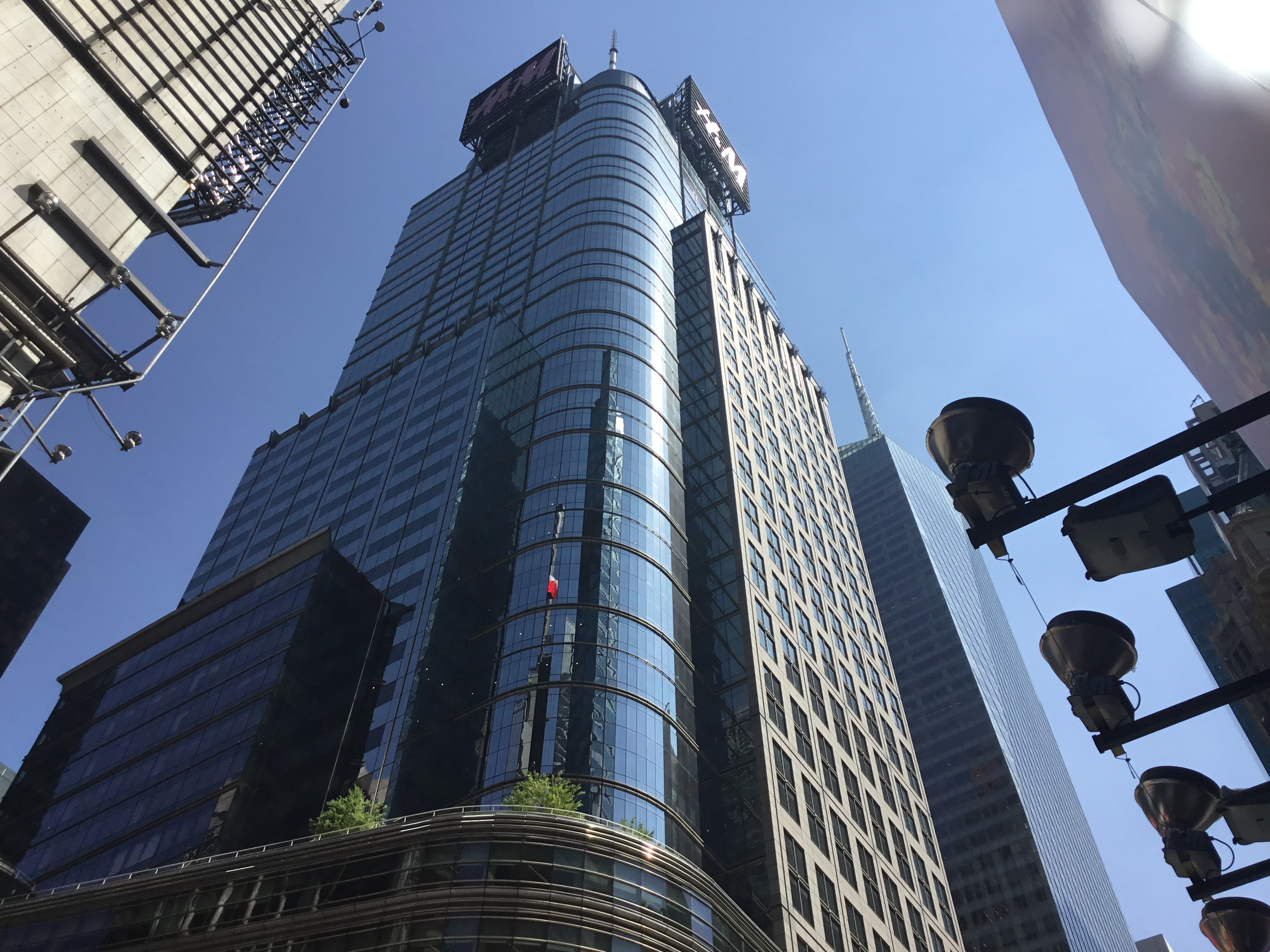
Southeastern corner, showing the glass facade on Broadway (left) and masonry facade on 42nd Street (right)

The building is partially powered by two fuel cells that are capable of 200 kW (270 hp) each. They are installed on the fourth floor. The two cells could provide 50 percent of the exterior signs' nighttime power needs but a minuscule amount of the daytime needs. They could generate eight percent of the building's total electricity. The fuel cells cost $1 million and were made by United Technologies Corporation. As part of an agreement with Consolidated Edison (Con Ed), which operates much of New York City's power-supply system, the cells must be turned off during a power failure, such as the Northeast blackout of 2003.

Fox & Fowle originally planned to include eight fuel cells, which would have been capable of generating 12,800,000 kWh (46,000,000 MJ) of power annually, including all of the exterior signs' power needs. Along with the photovoltaic panels on the facade, the fuel cells would have been able to provide most of the power for 4 Times Square, with building managers purchasing power from the city's electrical grid from Con Ed only as needed. The fuel cells would have to run continuously to operate efficiently, since they could not be turned off or on easily, but the building's power needs were much lower at night during the day. Furthermore, each cell cost $600,000. Consequently, plans for six of the eight fuel cells were discarded in 1997.

==== Air delivery ====
Fox & Fowle and Durst decided to use chillers powered by natural gas to provide cool air to the offices. At the time, many buildings still used fossil fuels for power generation, and natural gas created much less pollution than other fossil fuels. Gas was used instead of electricity because gas could be stored for later use, while electricity had to be used when it is produced. According to Bruce Fowle of Fox & Fowle, the firm had contemplated using electric chillers, which could create and store ice at night, then use the ice to chill the offices during the daytime. Fowle said the firm had decided against using ice storage because it was more expensive than natural gas-powered chillers. After an upgrade in 2003, the building had 4,600 short tons (4,100 long tons; 4,200 t) of air conditioning.

The air-delivery system provides 50 percent more fresh air than is required by New York City building code. It can also be used to ventilate polluted air from specified floors; a separate exhaust shaft was designed for employee smoking areas. The air-circulation system was built so air on any set of three floors could be replaced every 24 to 48 hours. Sensors on each floor are used to monitor air quality, and the building's management team could adjust the air-delivery and ventilation systems as needed. Tenants could also independently adjust the heating and air-conditioning systems in their offices. The building's climate control system was designed to operate in tandem with the wastewater system, further reducing energy use.

==== Other features ====
The building is also served by recycling chutes. There are dedicated shafts for paper recycling and trash, which lead to storage bins in the basement. There is mechanical equipment on the 49th floor and on two mezzanines above it. These stories contain three diesel generators, which power the antenna mast and are capable of a combined 53 MW (71,000 hp). In addition, the 51st floor has FM transmitters and combiners while the 52nd floor has TV combiners.

=== Interior ===
The superstructure is made of both concrete and steel, though the structural core is made of concrete. The steel columns are embedded in shear walls made of reinforced concrete. The building uses demolition debris that was recycled from the previous structures on the site, and the previous foundations were also reused. Where newer foundations were installed, deep-rock caissons and deep foundations were used to minimize damage to neighboring buildings and subway tunnels. The building's core and external columns rise to the top of the building. The four large signs on the roof conceal the "hat truss" that connects the core and external columns. Behind the truss is mechanical space, which doubles as a damper. Inside, 4 Times Square has 1,600,000 sq ft (150,000 m^{2}) of space.

==== Lower stories ====
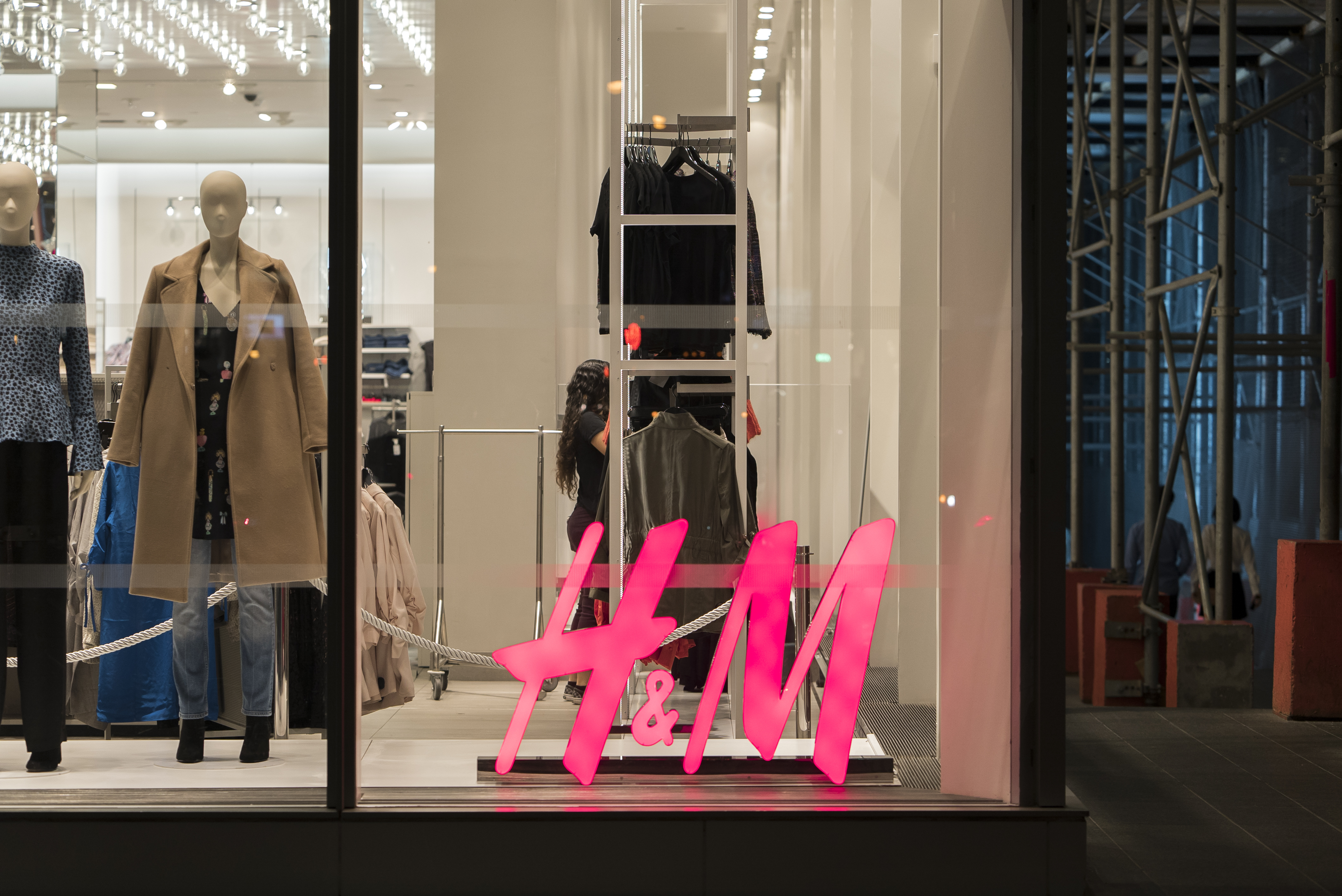
Storefront window of the H&M store in the building

The lobby is on the east side of the ground floor and is accessed from both 42nd and 43rd Streets. The ceiling contains aluminum and fiberglass panels, which curve downward from both entrances toward the center of the space. The lobby has an exhibit of the Durst Organization's history. There are also architectural models of various projects developed by the Durst Organization, such as the VIA 57 West residential development on Manhattan's West Side, as well as brochures of buildings owned by the company. There are also security checkpoints with turnstiles.

The building was designed with 100,000 ft^{2} (9,300 m^{2}) of retail space on the lowest three stories. When the building opened, the retail space was occupied by a three-story ESPN Zone entertainment restaurant, operated by The Walt Disney Company. The ground floor had an American grill called the Studio Grill; the second floor had the Screening Room, a sports-viewing area with television screens; and the third floor had the Sports Arena, which included a small practice facility and an arcade video game area. Part of the ground floor and basement was also occupied by a Duane Reade. Since 2013, the old ESPN space has contained a three-story H&M clothing store.

Einhorn Yaffee Prescott designed Nasdaq MarketSite's 28,500 sq ft (2,650 m^{2}) space at the northwest corner of the building. The space had a 72-seat auditorium, a public exhibit area, and a pair of broadcast studios below the large LED sign. The ground floor of the MarketSite contains a broadcast studio with a wall of 96 monitors, measuring 20 ft (6.1 m) tall and broadcasting information about stocks and the market. It is visible from the windows that overlook Times Square. An exhibit on the second floor was designed as the "MarketSite Experience", displaying items about MarketSite's history.

==== Condé Nast cafeteria ====
Frank Gehry designed an employee cafeteria on the fourth floor for Condé Nast. The cafeteria was Gehry's first New York City project; prior to designing the space, Gehry had had difficulty gaining any major commissions. Gehry had been friends with Condé Nast CEO Samuel Irving Newhouse Jr., who offered to hire Gehry for the interior design of Condé Nast's offices, a role that Gehry declined. When the cafeteria opened in 2000, it was directed by Sean J. Killeen and a staff of 53. The space was given several nicknames, such as "the Commissary" and "the Aquarium". The main cafeteria covered 10,800 ft^{2} (1,000 m^{2}) and could fit more than 250 people. (Note: Several sources agree on a figure of 260 seats, but Stern, Fishman & Tilove 2006, p. 717, gives a conflicting figure of 253 seats.) Next to the main cafeteria were four smaller dining rooms and an auditorium with 85 seats. The private dining rooms could fit 70. The New York Daily News said that James Truman, Condé Nast's editorial director, "spent months thinking about nothing else" during the design of the cafeteria. The cafeteria reportedly cost $30 to $35 million.

The main cafeteria measures 13 ft 2 in (4.01 m) tall. It was originally decorated with serpentine blue-titanium walls, as well as a ceiling with blue-titanium panels and hanging white shapes. The floor was made of plywood, but it was resurfaced in linoleum by 2002 because Condé Nast editors' high heels kept damaging the floor. Most of the seats were initially in 39 upholstered-leather booths with yellow elliptical wooden tables. The booths were slightly lifted on concrete podiums clad with wood, and the pathways through the cafeteria varied in elevation depending on the booths' height. Each booth is divided by angled glass partitions that measure 12 ft (3,650 mm) tall, 4 ft (1,200 mm) wide, and about 1 in (22 mm) thick and weighing 800 lb (360 kg) apiece. The panes are held in place by metal grommets at the top and bottom. It took one year for Gehry and the glass workers to determine how to bend the glass into a three-dimensional shape. Gehry used CATIA software to modify the glass. The partitions in the private dining rooms were sandblasted and were designed with overlaps. A model of part of the dining area was fabricated in Italy before being shipped to New York City.

After Condé Nast moved out during 2014, the cafeteria was unused for five years. Studios Architecture renovated the dining room, which reopened in 2018 as a tenant-only food hall operated by Claus Meyer. The floors were resurfaced in white oak; the leather seats and tables were replaced; and the titanium walls were covered with curving sheetrock and plaster. A set of test kitchens was turned into a reception area for an adjacent conference room. The northwestern western section of the cafeteria, which had once contained mechanical space behind the MarketSite sign, was converted into a garden room with a full-height green wall containing 2,200 plants. Seating capacity was increased to 300 during the renovation.

==== Offices ====
The lowest office floors cover 35,000 ft^{2} (3,300 m^{2}) each, while the highest floors cover 25,000 ft^{2} (2,300 m^{2}) each. When designing the building, Fox & Fowle tried to maximize the amount of space illuminated by natural light. Since natural light could only penetrate about 25 percent of each office story, the office stories contain a flexible open plan arrangement. The lighting in the office stories can be controlled by dimmers.

Condé Nast's space originally spanned floors 4 to 23 and cost an estimated $100 million. The Condé Nast offices were designed by Mancini Duffy, though Truman influenced the furnishings in the offices. The company's flagship magazines Vogue and Vanity Fair had their own stories, while The New Yorker had floors 20 and 21; the rest of the space had corporate offices. Most of Condé Nast's stories were shared by two publications; the elevator lobbies served as a common reception area, with glass doors on either side. Past the glass doors were curved "branding walls" with the logo of the publication that occupied the corresponding office space. Behind the "branding walls" on each floor are 750 ft^{2} (70 m^{2}) rectangular conference rooms with beige or gray decorations, as well as 350 ft^{2} (33 m^{2}) meeting spaces for editorial teams. Along the outer edges of each story, each publication's offices were connected by an "art corridor" decorated with works of art.

Most of Condé Nast's offices were arranged in an open plan, which was not popular among the publication's employees. The open-plan workspaces had white-laminate and blue-gray aluminum workstations with wooden accents. Only five percent of offices were directly adjacent to windows, but the open plan allowed many lower-ranking employees to have desks next to windows. Publishers and top editors had their own offices at the corners, while senior staffers had to work near the building's core. Some editors customized their offices. For example, Anna Wintour of Vogue used aluminum chairs and potted bulbs to resemble a setting in Home and Garden magazine, and Ruth Reichl of Gourmet designed her offices in a contemporary style with red accents. Graydon Carter of Vanity Fair redesigned his editorial office so it looked like his previous accommodations. Test kitchens, two private dining rooms, and a photograph studio were also installed for Gourmet's recipe editors. Newhouse's office was on the 11th floor, unlike other executive offices that were generally placed at the top.

== History ==
=== Planning ===
The Durst family had started acquiring property on the city block bounded by Broadway, Sixth Avenue, and 42nd and 43rd Streets in 1967, when Douglas Durst's father Seymour Durst bought a building that housed White's Sea Food Restaurant. Seymour Durst planned to redevelop the area east of Times Square with office skyscrapers, but he canceled these plans in 1973 amid a declining office market. Several other failed proposals followed for the block.

==== Early plans ====
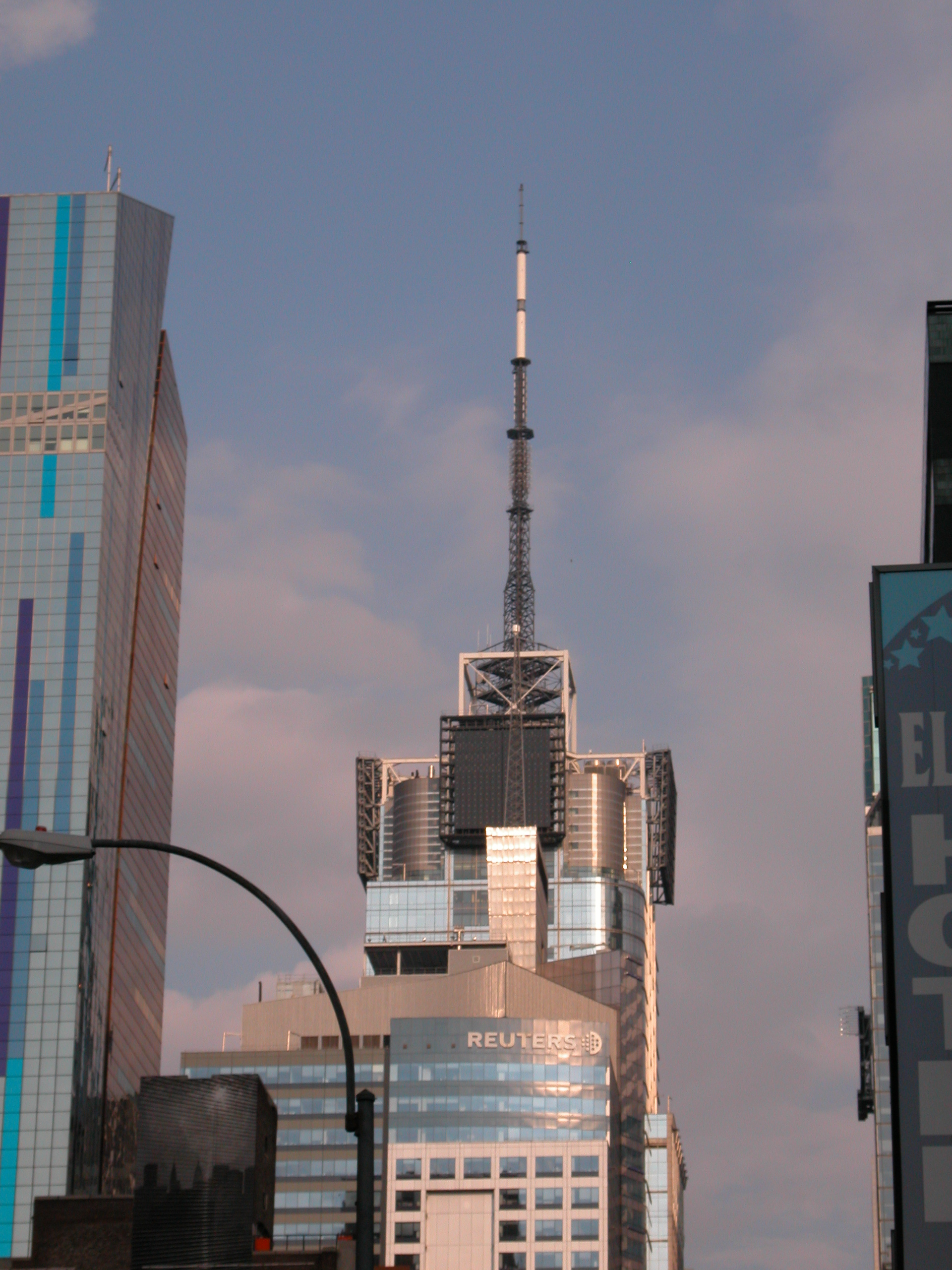
4 Times Square's spire as seen from a distance

The Empire State Development Corporation (ESDC), an agency of the New York state government, had proposed redeveloping the area around a portion of West 42nd Street in 1981. Four towers designed by Philip Johnson and John Burgee were to be built around 42nd Street's intersections with Broadway and Seventh Avenue; (Note: The sites were: Northwest corner of 42nd Street and Seventh Avenue: now 3 Times Square; Northeast corner of 42nd Street and Broadway: now 4 Times Square; Southwest corner of 42nd Street and Seventh Avenue: now 5 Times Square; South side of 42nd Street between Seventh Avenue and Broadway: now 7 Times Square (Times Square Tower)) the largest of those would have been a 56-story building at the northeast corner of 42nd Street and Broadway. These towers would have been redeveloped by George Klein of Park Tower Realty, though the Prudential Insurance Company of America joined the project in 1986. Furthermore, as part of the West Midtown special zoning district created in 1982, the New York City government had allowed new buildings in Times Square to be developed with an increased floor area ratio. To ensure the area would not be darkened at nightfall, the city passed zoning regulations that encouraged developers to add large, bright signs on their buildings.

The Durst Organization opposed the redevelopment for 15 years, citing concerns over the subsidies that were to be given to the developers, which in turn would decrease the value of the Dursts' buildings. Durst himself had acquired a small portion of what would be Park Tower and Prudential's office building, part of 20 lots on the same city block that he owned by February 1990. However, he was loath to develop his sites on the block until the 42nd Street redevelopment had been finalized. The Dursts' opposition, along with Prudential and Park Tower's inability to secure tenants for the proposed buildings, led government officials to allow Prudential and Park Tower to postpone the project in 1992. By then, Prudential had spent $300 million on condemning the sites through eminent domain. The partners retained the right to develop the sites in the future, and the ESDC's zoning guidelines remained in effect. Klein ceded decision-making power for the sites to Prudential, which decided to exit the real-estate market altogether, selling off all four sites.

==== Durst proposal ====
Seymour Durst ultimately died in mid-1995 before any building was developed on the block. By November 1995, Seymour's son Douglas Durst was negotiating with Prudential to develop the northeast corner of 42nd Street and Broadway with a larger skyscraper that would use the Durst family's adjacent lots. Durst asked Prudential to postpone the development of the other three sites until Durst had completed his building. The new building would be the first in the same redevelopment project that the Durst family had once opposed. Further, Durst planned to claim a 35 percent tax abatement for the project. Durst acquired a $215 million mortgage loan on three other buildings to fund the proposed skyscraper.

After a slight delay, Prudential's board voted to sell the site to Durst in February 1996. Klein was opposed to the proposed sale, citing the Durst family's previous objections to the redevelopment. Ultimately, Klein received an unknown amount of compensation for ceding the site's development rights to Durst. Durst acquired the plot that April, he combined the newly acquired lot, which covered 33,000 ft^{2} (3,100 m^{2}), with an adjacent lot owned by his family, covering 11,000 ft^{2} (1,000 m^{2}). Durst proposed a 1.6×10^{6} ft^{2} (150,000 m^{2}) skyscraper on the expanded site. To reduce concerns from community members and civic groups, he showed them his plans. Fox & Fowle was hired to design the building; at the time, it was one of four companies that were allowed to design green buildings in New York City. Its plan for limestone and glass facades was generally well received by civic groups such as the Municipal Art Society.

Before construction started, the state required a commitment from a large tenant. This led media sources to debate whether the building was a speculative development. Though Durst had intended the building to be developed without an anchor tenant, similar to speculative buildings, the state would not approve the project unless a tenant was secured. The author Matthew Wells characterized the building as "the first speculative office block to be completed in Manhattan for over a decade". At the time of the sale, Durst denied rumors that Condé Nast would occupy the building for its headquarters. That May, Condé Nast leased 500,000 ft^{2} (46,000 m^{2}), taking up floors 4 to 23, with an option for an additional 150,000 ft^{2} (14,000 m^{2}). The building was consequently named after Condé Nast. The publisher had wanted to consolidate the operations of 17 of its magazines, which then occupied six separate buildings, and many of its leases were set to expire in 2000. Condé Nast had selected 4 Times Square because of the environmentally-efficient features planned for the structure.

=== Construction ===
Preliminary work for 4 Times Square, as the building was known, began in September 1996. At the time, it was the first speculative office development to be built in Midtown Manhattan in fifteen years, and its construction prompted the development of other office buildings in the area. 4 Times Square and its three neighboring developments would collectively add almost 4×10^{6} ft^{2} (370,000 m^{2}) of office space. All four projects were being marketed with a Times Square address, which until the early 1990s had not been popular in the city's real estate market. The project was to receive $10.7 million in tax relief and Durst was to receive a $4 million tax exemption every year. That October, law firm Skadden, Arps, Slate, Meagher & Flom agreed to move its headquarters to 4 Times Square, with 660,000 ft^{2} (61,000 m^{2}) on the top 21 stories. Skadden Arps's commitment was part of an increase in leasing in buildings around Times Square. By March 1997, though the building's site had not been fully excavated, 87 percent of the office space had already been leased. Rainforest Cafe tentatively agreed to lease a storefront in the street level and basement that July.

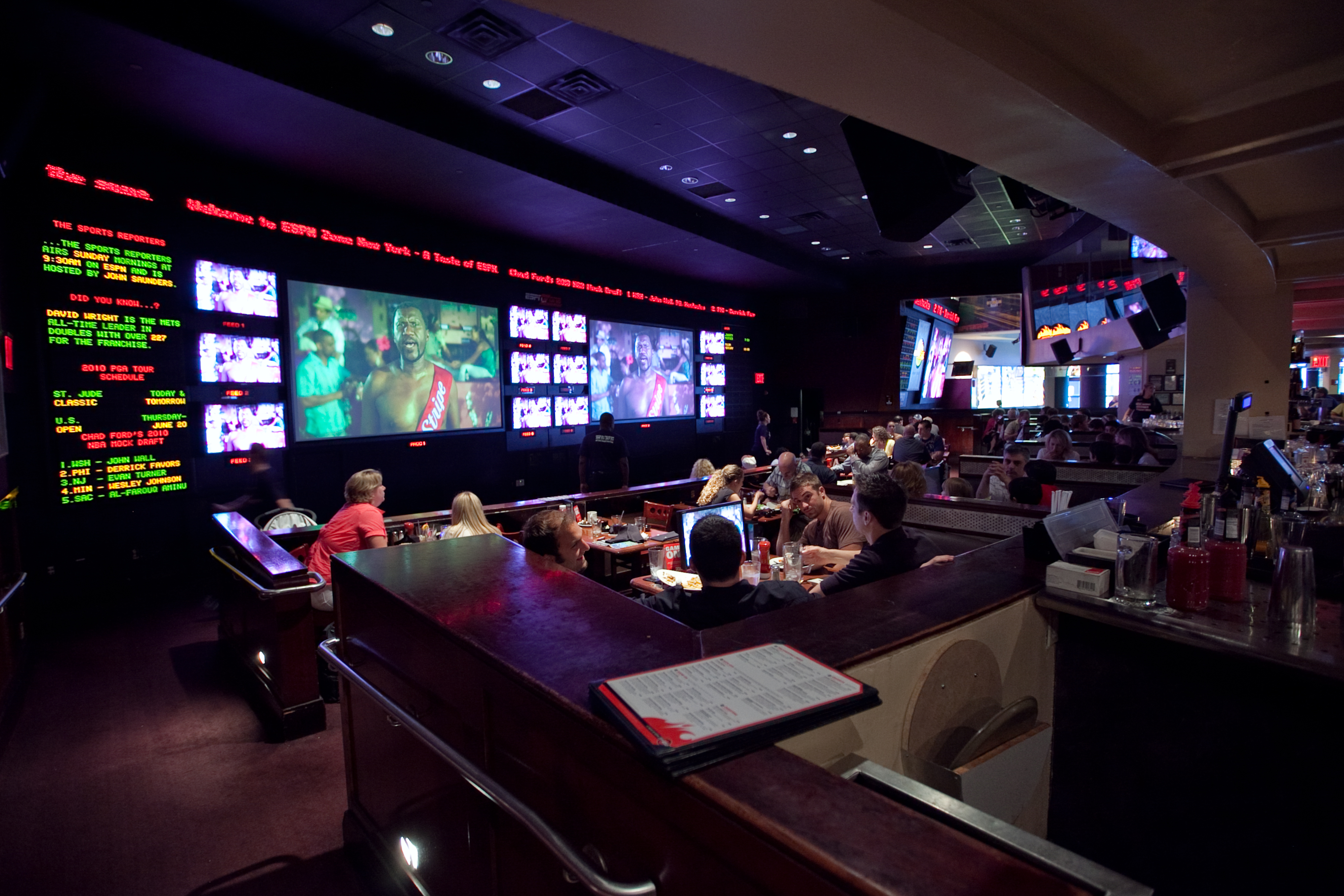
Disney leased three stories of retail in late 1998 for the ESPN Zone entertainment restaurant.

Since most of the office space had been taken by Condé Nast and Skadden Arps, the Durst Organization decided to distribute CDs to promote the retail space and the signs atop the building. The promotional CD contained a photo gallery of Times Square's history, details of 4 Times Square's green-building features, and a map of planned hotels and stores nearby. The Durst Organization received a $340 million construction loan in mid-1997. The loan was issued by a syndicate of banks led by the Bank of New York. The site was cleared by that August 1997. The superstructure had risen to 30 stories by the February 1998, though steel construction was delayed by the rainy weather. Around that time, Nasdaq was considering leasing a marketing center and TV studio at 4 Times Square. By mid-1998, it had agreed to lease the space and add an LED sign around the cylindrical northwest corner. Disney leased three stories of retail later that year for the ESPN Zone entertainment restaurant.

Several incidents occurred during construction, leading the city's tabloid newspapers to describe the construction site as "jinxed". A construction crane fell onto a building on 43rd Street in January 1998, and a piece of aluminum dropped from the northern facade that April, though no one was hurt in either incident. That June, a carpenter was crushed to death by an elevator. The most severe incident occurred on July 21, 1998, when a construction elevator fell onto the nearby Woodstock Hotel, killing an 85-year-old woman and injuring twelve other people. The surrounding area was closed to the public and many residents and businesses were displaced; the area could not be reopened until netting was installed around the collapsed scaffold. After the scaffold was disassembled, the surrounding segment of 43rd Street was reopened a month after the collapse, though Woodstock Hotel residents did not return until that October.

The July 1998 construction collapse delayed construction by two months. Following an investigation, U.S. government officials said in early 1999 that the scaffold had collapsed because it had lacked crucial support beams. The construction crane was being disassembled by February 1999; at the time, it was the eighth-tallest structure in Manhattan. The next month, as the building was being completed, falling debris from the construction site injured three pedestrians.

=== Usage ===
==== Opening ====
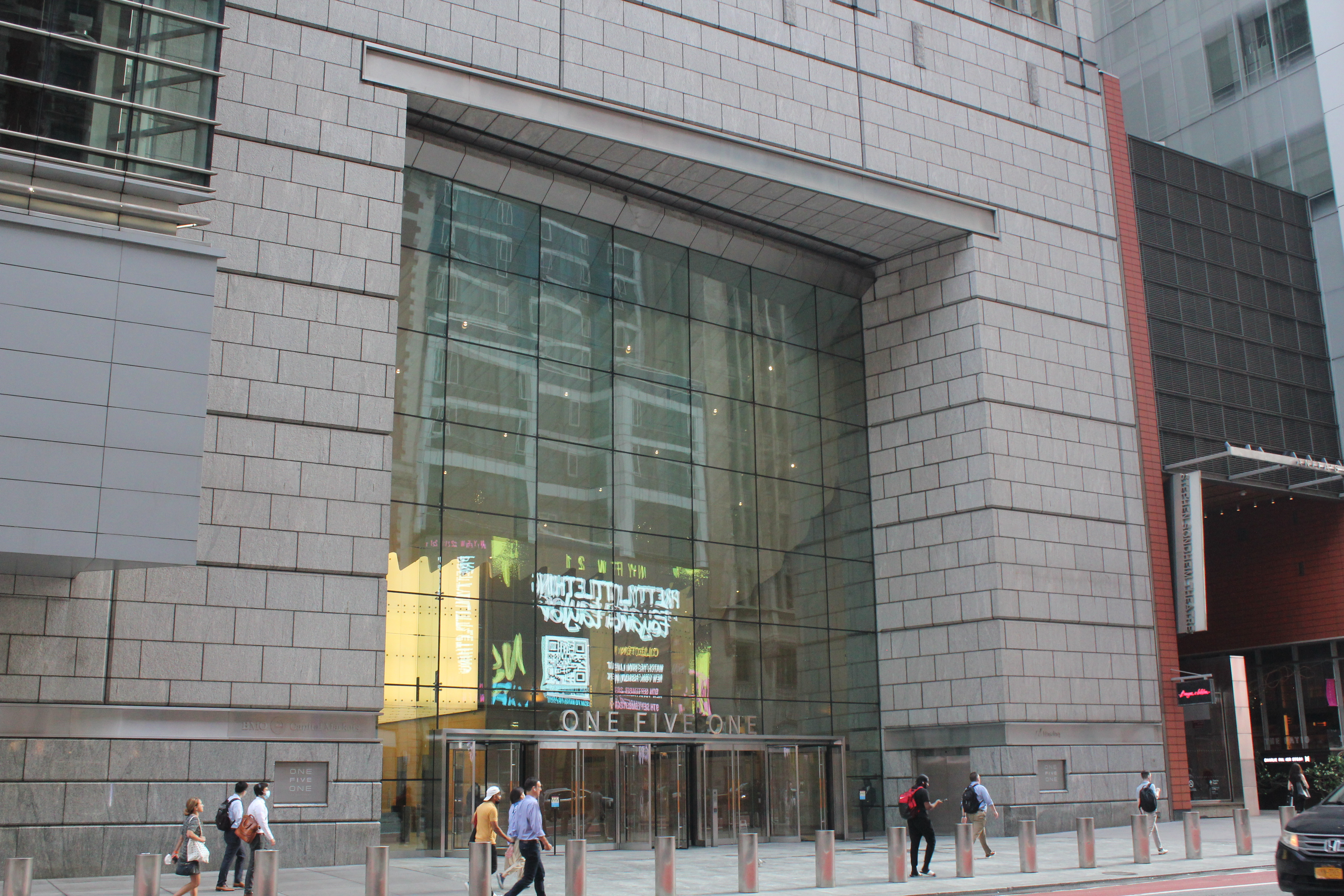
42nd Street entrance

The first Condé Nast employees began moving into the building on June 21, 1999, when almost 200 employees from Brides, House & Garden, and Women's Sports and Fitness moved to the structure. The relocations continued over the two following months. The overall reaction among Condé Nast employees was positive, though some were critical of the building; one editor would not preview the building prior to the move, while another expressed concern about the construction incidents. Furthermore, many staff members of The New Yorker were reluctant to move to 4 Times Square, though this was more heavily influenced by the fact that The New Yorker previously occupied a different building from the other Condé Nast publications. Many Condé Nast staff arrived at the building in limousines, which created congestion on nearby streets, prompting the city government to create a limousine-dropoff area nearby.

At the building's opening, Durst also faced two class-action lawsuits from nearby business owners as a result of the construction incidents in 1998. These were both dismissed in July 1999 because the business owners did not suffer physical damage. In addition, Nasdaq and Condé Nast had disagreed over the proposed LED sign since the beginning of 1999, leading the two companies to seek an arbitration proceeding. Condé Nast claimed that the sign would block the windows of its art department and that it protruded too far from the facade. In response, Nasdaq said the sign was within the terms of its own lease and that, in any case, Condé Nast's graphic-arts department did not need natural light. An arbitrator ruled in favor of Nasdaq in August 1999, and the Nasdaq MarketSite sign started illuminating that December. By the end of 1999, Durst was looking to refinance the building to replace the construction loan from the Bank of New York.

==== 2000s ====
The building's fourth-floor cafe opened in April 2000 and was renovated two years afterward. Meanwhile, the signs atop the building remained unused through early 2000. Teligent was the first company to pay $500,000 a year for the signs, but it went bankrupt a year after the signs were installed. By late 2001, Nasdaq was contemplating relocating its offices (which had been damaged in the September 11 attacks) to 4 Times Square, where only 30,000 ft^{2} (2,800 m^{2}) of office space was vacant. Several radio stations had also been forced to move to 4 Times Square after the attacks, prompting the addition of an FM antenna for WNYC in March 2002. The Duane Reade pharmacy chain leased the remaining ground-floor space and part of the basement in mid-2002.

After the September 11 attacks, Durst was unable to refinance 4 Times Square because his insurer had dropped terrorism coverage from its policy. A judge issued a restraining order preventing mortgage holder Cigna from declaring the building in default until April 2002. The restraining order was extended to May; a few minutes before the extension was set to expire, it was extended again to September. In the meantime, a New York state judge ruled that Cigna could force Durst to carry terror insurance. The lack of insurance led Moody's Investors Service to reduce the credit rating of the loan on 4 Times Square. Following the passage of a terror-insurance law in November 2002, Durst said he was amenable to buy a cheaper terror-insurance policy. Cigna and Durst had reached a settlement by late 2003, when the credit rating of the property loan was upgraded after Durst obtained terror insurance.

Meanwhile, in November 2002, Durst announced that he would construct a 358 ft (109 m) antenna mast atop 4 Times Square as a backup facility for radio stations that had broadcast from the World Trade Center. The original antenna mast was designed for four stations but was serving eight stations, while the new antenna mast would be designed to serve 18 stations. The old mast was disassembled and the new mast was constructed starting in March 2003. Univision signed an agreement to build an antenna on the building. During construction, a temporary one-bay antenna was mounted atop 4 Times Square. The work, costing $25 million, included adding structural reinforcements. The new mast was finished on October 2, 2003, with the first broadcast occurring on October 30 of the same year.

During the mid-2000s, Durst spent $300,000 to install repeaters and antennas that could operate the core mechanical systems in case of an emergency. The equipment was completed in 2006. By then, the signs atop the building were not being used by any advertiser and contained the number "4". In the late 2000s, Durst developed the Bank of America Tower on the eastern side of the block, obscuring views from 4 Times Square's eastern facade.

==== 2010s to present ====
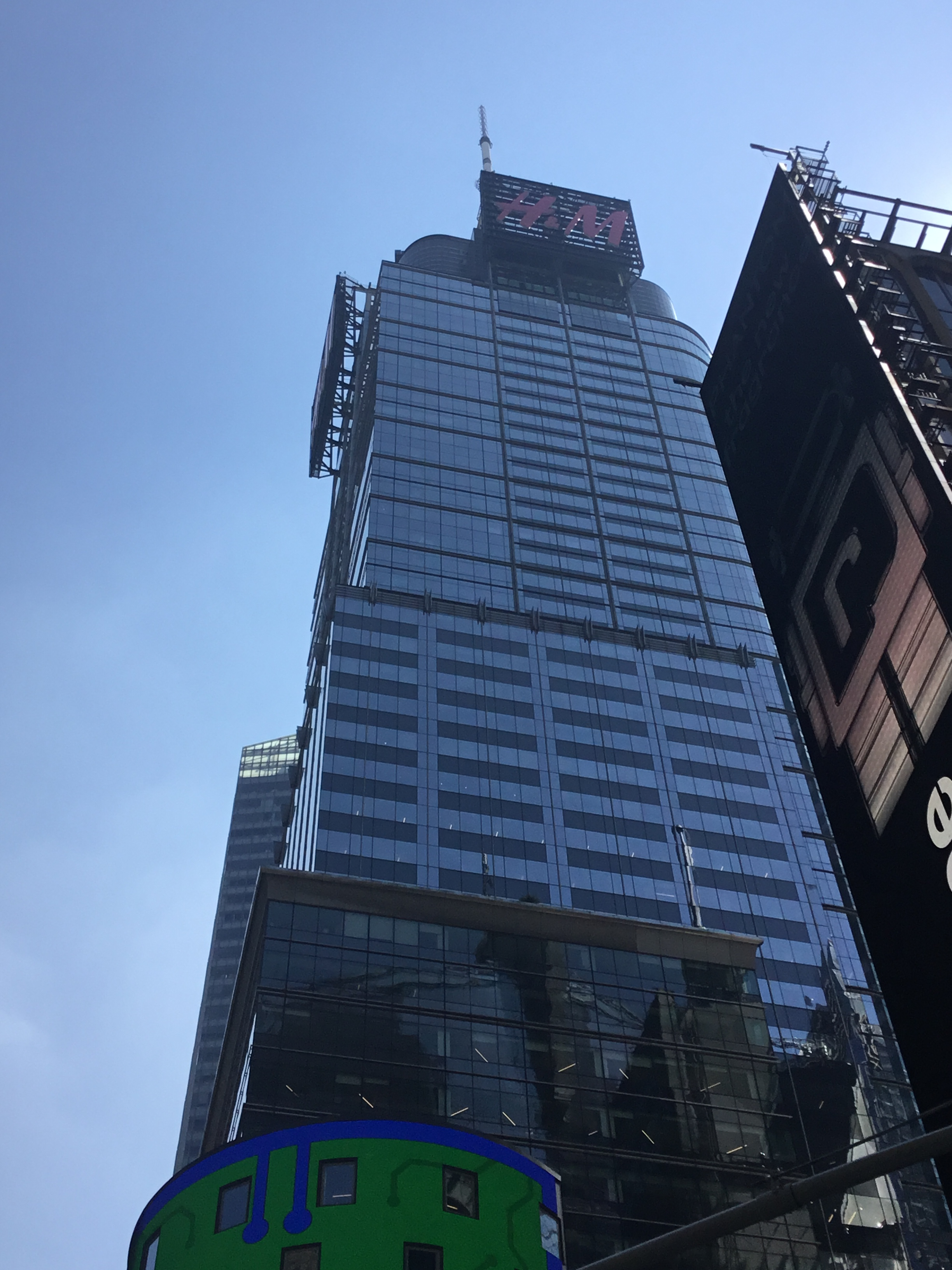
As seen from ground level

The ESPN Zone restaurant closed in June 2010 following the 2008 financial crisis. Around that time, Condé Nast signed a lease to relocate to the new One World Trade Center when that building was completed. The retail space remained vacant for over two years and, following a failed negotiation with Express, Inc., H&M agreed to lease the majority of the retail space in late 2012. H&M announced in August 2013 that it would install panels with its logo atop the building, and the H&M store opened that November. Condé Nast moved to One World Trade Center between November 2014 and January 2015. After the relocation, preservationists expressed concern that the Condé Nast cafeteria would be destroyed, since Skadden Arps had its own cafeteria. In early 2015, the Durst Organization indicated it would preserve the cafeteria but would have to find a tenant for it.

Among the later tenants was Nasdaq, which in February 2018 moved its global headquarters to the building and extended the MarketSite lease. Nasdaq planned to expand MarketSite over the following three years; the expansion included a 10th-story event space with a 2,100 ft^{2} (200 m^{2}) terrace that would be able to accommodate 400 people. During the late 2010s, the Durst Organization renovated the building's main entrance and lobby for $140 million. In addition, the fourth-floor dining room was renovated for $35 million; after the renovation was completed in 2018, the dining room was opened to all of the building's tenants. The Durst Organization also installed beehives on the building's roof to create honey for the dining room. After the renovation, 4 Times Square had 45,600 ft^{2} (4,240 m^{2}) of amenity space.

Skadden Arps itself planned to move out of Four Times Square by 2020, having signed a lease at One Manhattan West. The building's two major tenants had occupied nearly all the office space, and their departure would leave the building almost vacant. In the five years after Condé Nast's departure, the Durst Organization secured tenants for the publisher's former space. All of the old Condé Nast space had been leased by April 2019. Durst then refinanced the building with $900 million from JPMorgan Chase and Wells Fargo. The refinancing came after $650 million of commercial mortgage-backed securities, issued by UBS, had matured. The Durst Organization also planned to rebrand the building as 151 West 42nd Street. By July 2022, the Durst Organization had leased out the last two vacant floors that Skadden Arps had occupied. Durst refinanced the building in August 2025 with a $1.3 billion loan, receiving $146 million from the transaction.

== Tenants ==
Most of the space at 4 Times Square was occupied by Condé Nast and Skadden Arps prior to 2015. Afterward, their former spaces have been occupied by a variety of companies:

- SS&C Technologies, a financial technology company, signed for 140,000 sq ft (13,000 m^{2}) in January 2016. The company added 31,396 sq ft (2,916.8 m^{2}) in 2019, taking up all of floors 5, 6, and 7.
- Fross Zelnick Lehrman & Zissu, a law firm, leased 41,221 sq ft (3,829.6 m^{2}) on one full floor in September 2016.
- ICAP, a financial securities company, leased 82,000 sq ft (7,600 m^{2}) on floors 13 and 14 in September 2016.
- RSM US, an accounting firm, signed a 95,000 sq ft (8,800 m^{2}) lease to take the entirety of floors 10 and 11, as well as part of floor 12, in January 2017.
- HedgeServ Corporation, a financial technology firm, signed for 53,456 sq ft (4,966.2 m^{2}) on floor 8 in August 2017.
- National Cable Communications signed for 65,000 sq ft (6,000 m^{2}) on floor 11 and part of floor 12 in January 2019. It then expanded by 16,724 sq ft (1,553.7 m^{2}) on the remainder of floor 12.
- Analysis Group, an economic consulting firm, leased 58,029 sq ft (5,391.1 m^{2}) on floor 23 and part of floor 22 in January 2019.
- BMO Capital Markets leased 215,056 sq ft (19,979.4 m^{2}) on floors 9 and 29 in April 2019.
- Nasdaq leased 145,000 sq ft (13,500 m^{2}) for its headquarters in February 2018, then expanded to 180,000 sq ft (17,000 m^{2}) in May 2019 by leasing the entirety of floor 28.
- Vevo, a video hosting service, leased 38,000 sq ft (3,500 m^{2}) on floor 25 in June 2019.
- Vidaris, a consulting firm, leased 19,000 sq ft (1,800 m^{2}) on floor 24 in July 2021.
- Mitsubishi International, a conglomerate, leased 68,000 sq ft (6,300 m^{2}) on floors 34 and 35 in July 2021.
- Venable LLP, a law firm, leased 158,000 ft^{2} (14,700 m^{2}) on floors 48 to 52, as well as on a concourse, in October 2021.
- Varagon Capital Partners, an asset management firm, leased 31,515 ft^{2} (2,927.8 m^{2}) in March 2022.
- Chicago Trading Company leased 68,339 ft^{2} (6,348.9 m^{2}) in July 2022, occupying the last full-floor spaces available.

== Critical reception ==
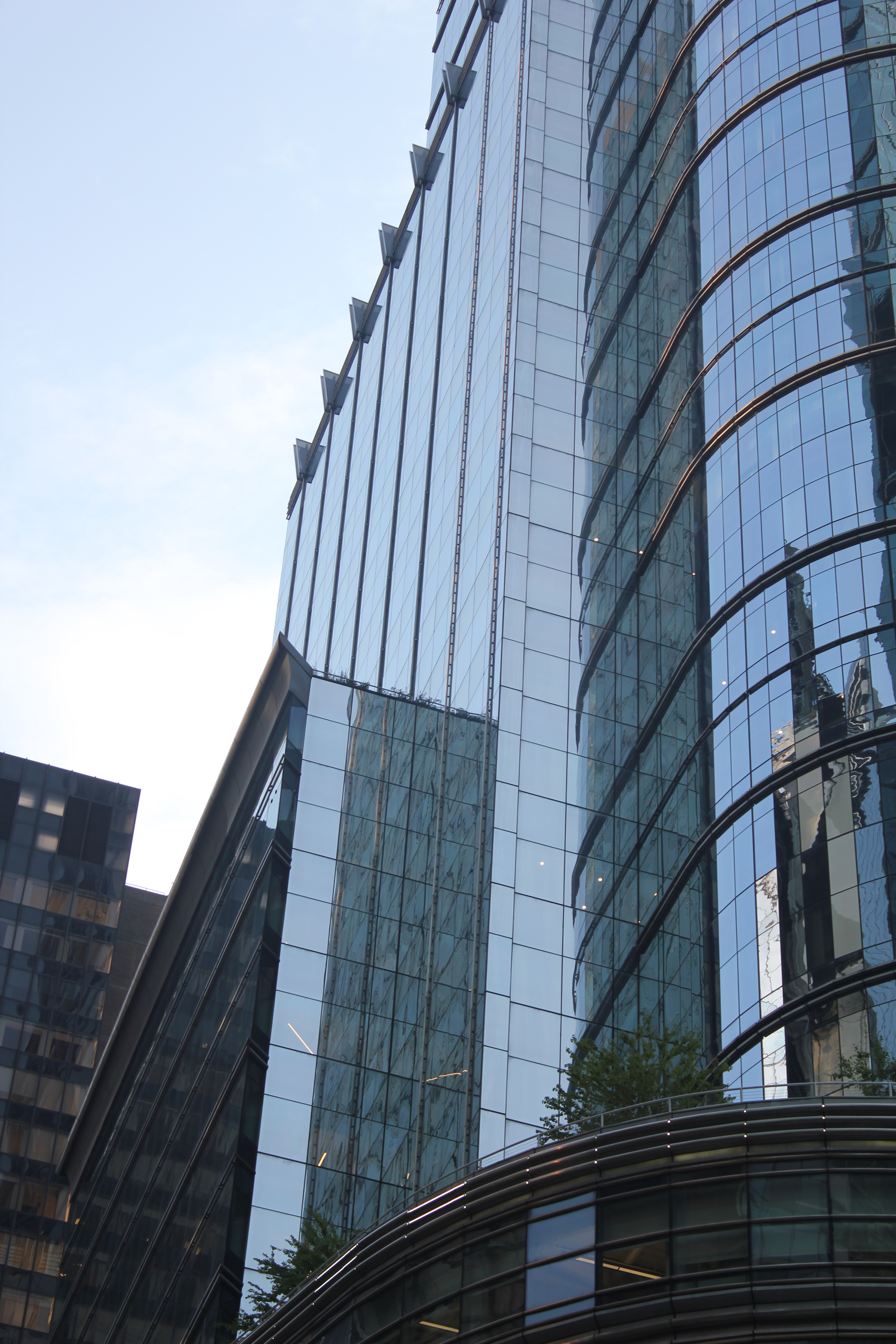
Broadway facade viewed from 42nd Street

When construction of 4 Times Square began in 1996, Paul Goldberger wrote for The New York Times, "While the building is far from modest in size, [Fox & Fowle's design] is significantly improved from the original plans by Philip Johnson and John Burgee." For the same newspaper, Herbert Muschamp wrote that the building "is not monstrously out of scale" with other contemporary developments. Muschamp said it looked like a custom design for Condé Nast, "whose stock in trade is the knowing mix of high style and popular culture". Karrie Jacobs of New York magazine also considered Fox & Fowle's design to be better than Johnson and Burgee's plan, adding that "It's the perfect building for a culture that consists of nothing but fragmented references to what has come before". The building was pictured in the August 1998 issue of Vogue magazine, which was published as scheduled despite the fatal construction collapse the previous month.

After the building was completed, Suzanne Stephens wrote that the decorative elements on the glass facades "seem unnecessary" from a purist point of view, though she added that decorative features in the Empire State Building and Chrysler Building were similarly criticized upon their respective completions. Muschamp said of the different facades of the building: "it wants to be at once a background building and a foreground building, both star and chorus". Jacobs called the building "better as a piece of social commentary than as architecture" with its contrasting facades. 4 Times Square also received awards from the American Institute of Architects and AIA's New York state chapter.

The Condé Nast cafeteria was largely praised, with Muschamp referring to the cafeteria as "an underwater hypostyle hall". Brent Richards wrote in the book New Glass Architecture that Gehry was able to create a "seemingly impossible fluidity" with the partitions, while Arcspace magazine said of the cafeteria, "Gehry's formalism has produced an informality that encourages chance encounters of the friendly, and even romantic, kind." The Nasdaq MarketSite facade on Broadway and 43rd Street was also critiqued; Jacobs described it as a "glowing 140-foot-high soda can". Muschamp said the cylindrical facade would "make a dandy giant soda can, film spool, aerosol spray, or a current issue of House and Garden".

== See also ==
- List of buildings and structures on Broadway in Manhattan
- Buildings and architecture of New York City
- List of tallest buildings in New York City
- List of tallest freestanding structures in the world
- List of tallest freestanding steel structures
