= George Stonbely =

George N. Stonbely (born December 7, 1945) is an American advertising entrepreneur and civic leader known for his work and advocacy in New York's Times Square.

Born in 1945 in Park Slope, Brooklyn, New York, George N. Stonbely graduated from New York University in 1967. While still in college, he first volunteered then worked as a legislative researcher for Robert F. Kennedy, who was the United States Senator from New York at the time. Stonbely worked briefly in sales promotion and advertising for the New York Times, then in 1975, he founded Spectacolor, Inc., an advertising company that pioneered the first full-color, computer-programmed, changeable message billboard.

The first Spectacolor sign was installed at One Times Square. Eventually more than 60 Spectacolor signs (including static signs, video displays, and 3D spectacular signs) were installed in Times Square, along with more than 50 Spectacolor systems in 30 cities in Europe, South America, the Middle East, and across the United States. In 1984, Spectacolor was chosen by the Marriott Corporation to develop the signage on its new Marriott Marquis Hotel.

In 2000, Stonbely partnered with Arizona entrepreneur Karl Eller and Clear Channel Communications to form Clear Channel Spectacolor, which he sold to Clear Channel in 2006. A long-time Times Square advocate, Stonbely is a founding director of the Times Square Alliance and serves on the Mayor's Midtown Citizens Committee.
