= Bruce Fowle =

American architect

Bruce Fowle FAIA is an American architect. He co-founded Fox & Fowle Architects in 1978 and is now Founding Principal Emeritus at FXCollaborative.

Fowle's work ranges from high-rise, multi-use complexes to cultural institutions and private homes. Fowle has earned the firm a number of major awards, including a 2001 National Honor Award for Design, the highest honor that the American Institute of Architects bestows on a project, for 4 Times Square. He is also known for his work on Manhattan's Second Avenue Subway, the Reuters Building (3 Times Square), The New York Times Building, and the renovation and expansion of the Jacob K. Javits Convention Center.

Fowle was a founder and chairman of the New York chapter of Architects/Designers/Planners for Social Responsibility, an advocacy group for social justice and a sustainable built environment. He is on the Advisory Boards of New School University's Eugene Lang College and the New York City Ballet. Following the September 11 attacks on the World Trade Center, he helped create and mobilize New York New Visions, a coalition of organizations to help shape the planning and design response to the destruction. He continues to serve on the executive board which acts in an advisory capacity, providing vision and guidance to the Lower Manhattan Development Corporation.

A 1960 graduate of the Syracuse University School of Architecture, Fowle was a founder and chair of the school's Advisory Board and was the recipient of its George Arents Pioneer Medal in 2001. He is LEED accredited by the U.S. Green Building Council.

Fowle was elevated to the American Institute of Architects College of Fellows in 1985, elected into the National Academy as an Associate member in 1991, and became a full Academician in 1994. He has served as President of the National Academy since 2011. In 2016, Fowle received the American Institute of Architects New York State (AIANYS) President's Award.

== Works ==
- 4 Times Square, Manhattan, New York City – 1999, Fox & Fowle
- Reuters Building (3 Times Square), Manhattan, New York City – 2001, Fox & Fowle
- Berkshire School Dormitory, Sheffield, Massachusetts – 2002, Fox & Fowle
- Whitman School of Management, Syracuse University, Syracuse, New York – 2005, FXFOWLE
- Sky House, Manhattan, New York City – 2008, FXFOWLE
- 250 Hudson Street Green Roof, Manhattan, New York City – 2009, FXFOWLE
- Javits Center Renovation, Manhattan, New York City – 2010, FXFOWLE
