= FXCollaborative =

American architecture, planning, and design firm

Practice information
- Partners: Guy Geier, Dan Kaplan, Sylvia Smith, Mark Strauss, Heidi Blau, Stephan Dallendorfer, Brian Fanning, Nicholas Garrison, Angie Lee, Tim Milam, Jack Robbins, Gustavo Rodriguez, Ann Rolland, John Schuyler, Michael Syracuse
- Founders: Bob Fox, Bruce Fowle
- Founded: 1978
- Location: Manhattan, New York City

Significant works and honors
- Buildings: Condé Nast Building, Reuters Building, Eleven Times Square, Statue of Liberty Museum

Website
- fxcollaborative.com

FXCollaborative is an American architecture, planning, and interior design firm founded in 1978 by Bob Fox and Bruce Fowle as Fox & Fowle Architects. The firm merged with Jambhekar Strauss in 2000 and was renamed to FXFOWLE Architects in 2005 following Fox's departure. The firm was renamed to FXCollaborative on January 18, 2018. The firm is best known for projects in New York City including the Condé Nast Building, Reuters Building (3 Times Square), Eleven Times Square, renovation of the Jacob K. Javits Convention Center, and the Statue of Liberty Museum.

== Selected projects ==
- One Willoughby Square, Brooklyn, NY (2021)
- Statue of Liberty Museum, New York Harbor (2019)
- 888 Boylston Street, Boston, MA (2016)
- 35XV, New York, NY (2016)
- Scott Bieler Clinical Sciences Center, Roswell Park Comprehensive Cancer Center, Buffalo, NY (2016)
- Congregation Kehilath Jeshurun Synagogue Reconstruction, New York, NY (2015)
- Allianz Tower, Istanbul, Turkey (2014)
- Hunter's Point Campus, Queens, NY (2013)
- Jacob K. Javits Center Renovation, New York, NY (2013)
- Eleven Times Square, New York, NY (2010)
- Alice Tully Hall and The Juilliard School Renovation and Expansion, New York, NY (2009), in collaboration with Diller Scofidio + Renfro
- Center for Global Conservation at the Bronx Zoo, New York, NY (2009)
- The New York Times Building, New York, NY (2009), in collaboration with Renzo Piano Building Workshop
- Reuters Building (3 Times Square), New York, NY (2001)
- Condé Nast Building (4 Times Square), New York, NY (1999)
- Broad Financial Center (finished 1986)
