= First World Towers =

Residential complex in Incheon, South Korea

The First World Towers consist of four luxury residential skyscrapers in Songdo International Business District, Incheon, South Korea. They are the first residential complex to be completed in the city in 2009. The four towers measure 237 m (776 ft) each with 67 floors, making them one of the tallest residential skyscrapers in the world and the tallest residential skyscraper in the metropolis of Incheon.
