= Anita Durst =

American actress

- Born: New York City, United States
- Occupations: actress, arts administrator
- Known for: founder and director of Chashama
- Parent: Douglas Durst (father)

Anita Durst (born in New York City) is an actress and the founder and director of the non-profit arts organization Chashama.

She is the daughter of real estate scion and executive Douglas Durst who has been the President of the Durst Organization since 1992.

As an actress she worked with the Iranian-born playwright Reza Abdoh (1963–1995). In 2001, she was nominated for that year's Drama Desk Award for Outstanding Featured Actress in a Play for her role as Marianne in the New York Theatre Workshop's production of The Bitter Tears of Petra von Kant (a play by Rainer Werner Fassbinder which went on to also become one of his films) at the Henry Miller Theater.

Chashama, the arts concern Anita Durst founded in 1995, helps artists by reappropriating and converting unused often formerly commercial real estate space into reasonably priced studio and display areas.
