= Debt clock =

Public counter for government debt

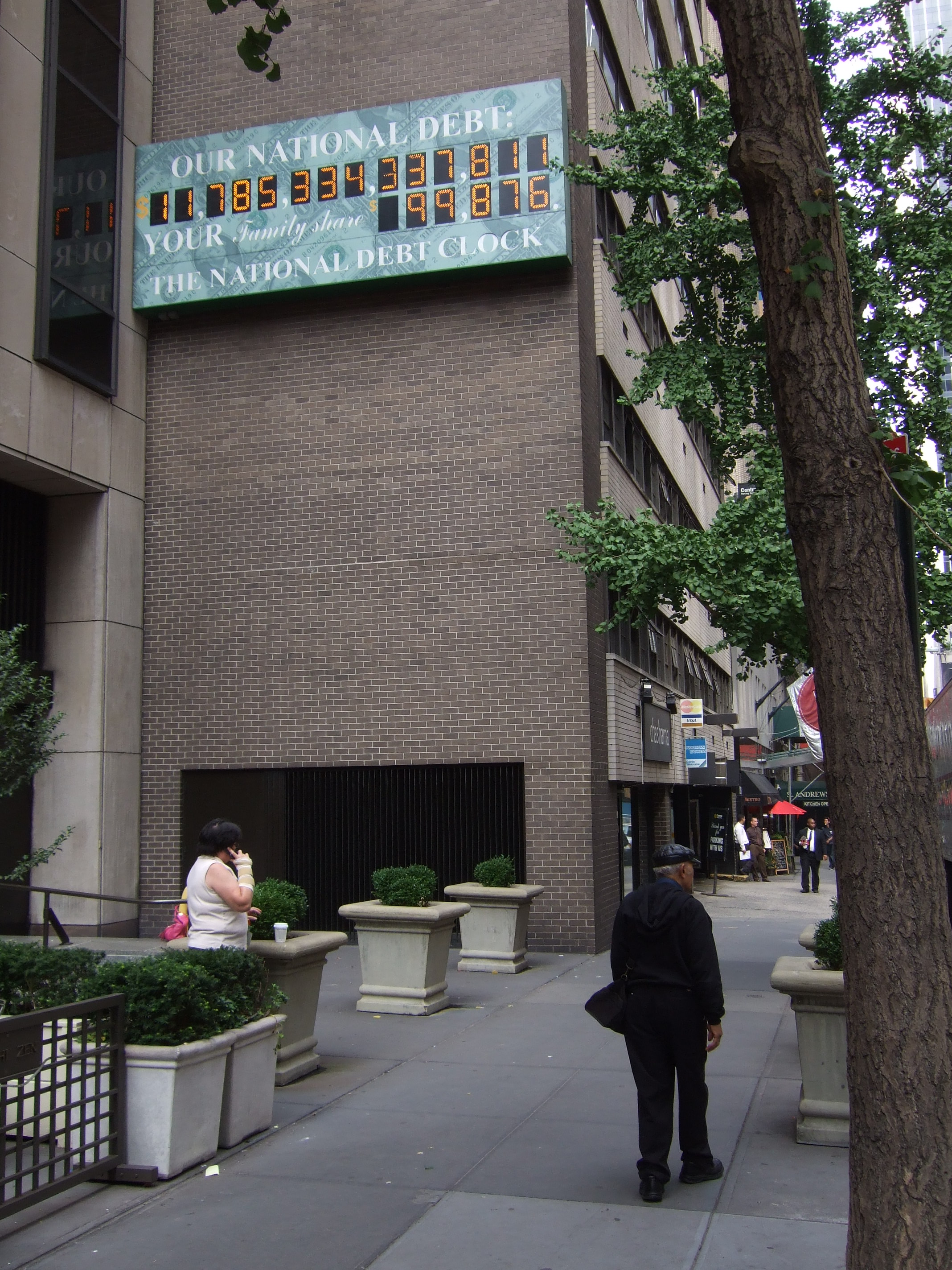
The National Debt Clock in New York (2009), an example for all other projects of that kind

A debt clock is a public counter, which displays the government debt (also known as public debt or national debt) of a public corporation, usually of a state, and which visualizes the progression through an update every second. Because of the mirror-image correlation between liabilities and accounts receivable meanwhile there are assets clocks or property clocks also, which visualize the private and state assets. Clocks to display the national interest charge are called interest clocks.

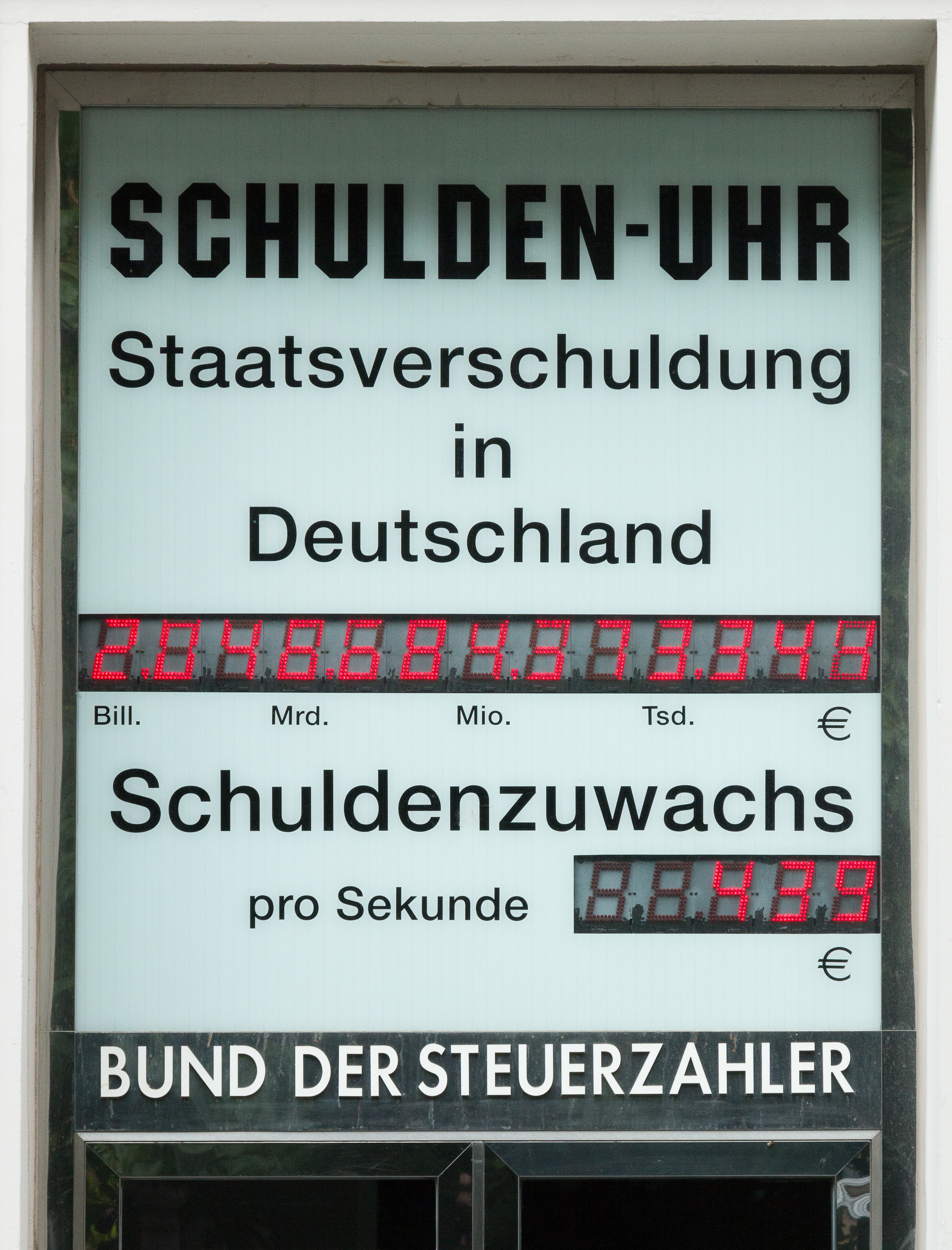
Debt clock of the German Taxpayers Federation shows its prognosis about the public debt of Germany.

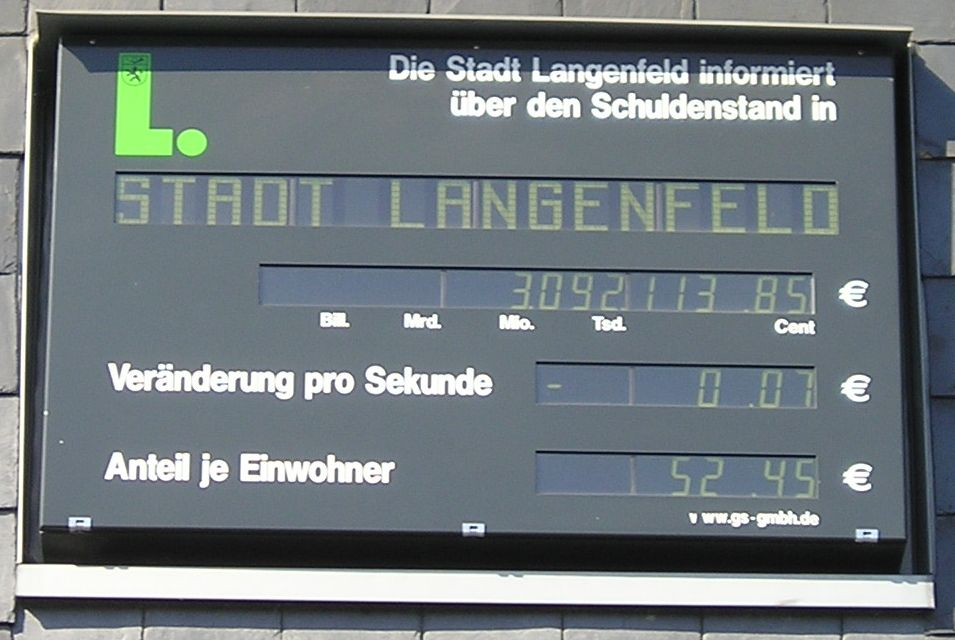
Debt clock in Langenfeld, Germany

== Purpose ==
The debt clock strikingly shows the dynamics of the state's debt growth. In this connection private debts and the growth of the monetary assets of the creditors are disregarded. The debt clock, besides showing the actual new indebtedness of the state through investment credits from government bonds, as well shows the effect out of interest and compound interest ("interest on interest") and the swelling of state indebtedness coming from the interest payable.

== Examples ==
Many countries and cities have public debt clocks installed.

- The first debt clock, the United States' National Debt Clock, was installed in 1989 at the intersection of 42nd Street and Sixth Avenue on the initiative of real estate developer Seymour Durst. It was relocated in 2004 to 1133 Sixth Avenue, and then again relocated in 2017 to the east wall of the arcade, which connects West 42nd and 43rd streets.
- Germany, German Taxpayers Federation debt clocks:
  - Berlin: A German debt clock is located at the entrance of the Federation headquarters since 16 June 2004. Besides the progression of German national debt, the increase per second is displayed too. The Taxpayers Federation estimates these values by adding an estimated probable borrowing of the current year to the state indebtedness of the previous year.
  - Wiesbaden: Also at the former headquarters of the German Taxpayers Federation in Wiesbaden, a debt clock has been running since 12 June 1995, which displays the total public debt, the per capita debt and the debt increase per second.
- Germany, Landtag of Lower Saxony: This debt clock is located in the group hall of the CDU (German party) in the Landtag of Lower Saxony.
- Germany, Munich: a debt clock has been running since 29 February 2008.
- Germany, Bonn, Haus der Geschichte: this one displays the total debt, debt per second and per capita debt.
- Germany, Düsseldorf, City Hall: Düsseldorf is a city which has been debt-free since 12 September 2007 after the sale of a RWE block of shares. There, the elapsed time is displayed instead of the debt.
- Germany, Langenfeld, Rhineland: after Langenfeld had become debt-free in 2008, the debt clock got dismantled.

== Critics ==
The missing confrontation of the growing assets and the increasing debts is criticised i.a. on the part of the unions. In this context an assets clock or property clock displaying the rising assets is encouraged.

Senior economist of the United Nations Conference on Trade and Development (UNCTAD), Heiner Flassbeck, in February 2007 criticised the bias and striking impact of the debt clock. He suggested to put a clock aside with a display of the private assets/property and its growth to enable the judgement of the debts against the background of present property values and assets. Meanwhile property- or richness clocks in several variants were published.
