= Gunther Building (Fifth Avenue) =

Commercial building in Manhattan, New York

Coordinates: 40.7501°N 73.9834°W

The Gunther Building was a seven-story commercial edifice in Manhattan located at 391 - 393 Fifth Avenue, between 36th Street and 37th Street. It occupied a plot 41.8 feet (12.7 m) on Fifth Avenue by 111.8 feet (34.1 m) in depth. Built in 1909, the establishment conformed in architecture, appointments, and construction with the Tiffany and Company Building, which adjoined it. The latter structure was designed by Stanford White and was constructed by Tiffany & Company in 1903, at the corner of the block on 37th Street.

== History of building site ==
For many years the edifice was leased by C.G. Gunther's Sons, furriers. Gunther's lease on the property expired in October 1929, when the company moved into a building which occupied the former site of the home of Mrs. W.K. Vanderbilt II., at 660 Fifth Avenue.

The Gunther Building was sold by Tiffany & Company to Benjamin Winter Inc., in February 1929, for $1.5 million. Joseph Durst purchased the Gunther Building for a similar price in March 1930. The same month the structure was leased long term by I. J. Fox Inc., a fur manufacturer and retailer.

== Popular retailer locale ==
Tots Toggerie, a retailer which sold children's clothing and school uniforms, rented two floors in the Gunther Building in July 1932. During the late summer of 1936 Stadler & Stadler, men's tailors, leased space in the structure. Culver, Hollyday & Company, a broker, negotiated the rental of Gunther Building space for David Custage, a fabrics dealer, in February 1938. The Merzon Corset Company moved to the Fifth Avenue locale from 45 West 57th Street, where it had been for a decade. It leased the sixth floor of the Gunther Building, which contained 4,000 square feet (370 m^{2}) of space, in August 1943.
