= Stephen Sondheim Theatre =

Broadway theater in Manhattan, New York

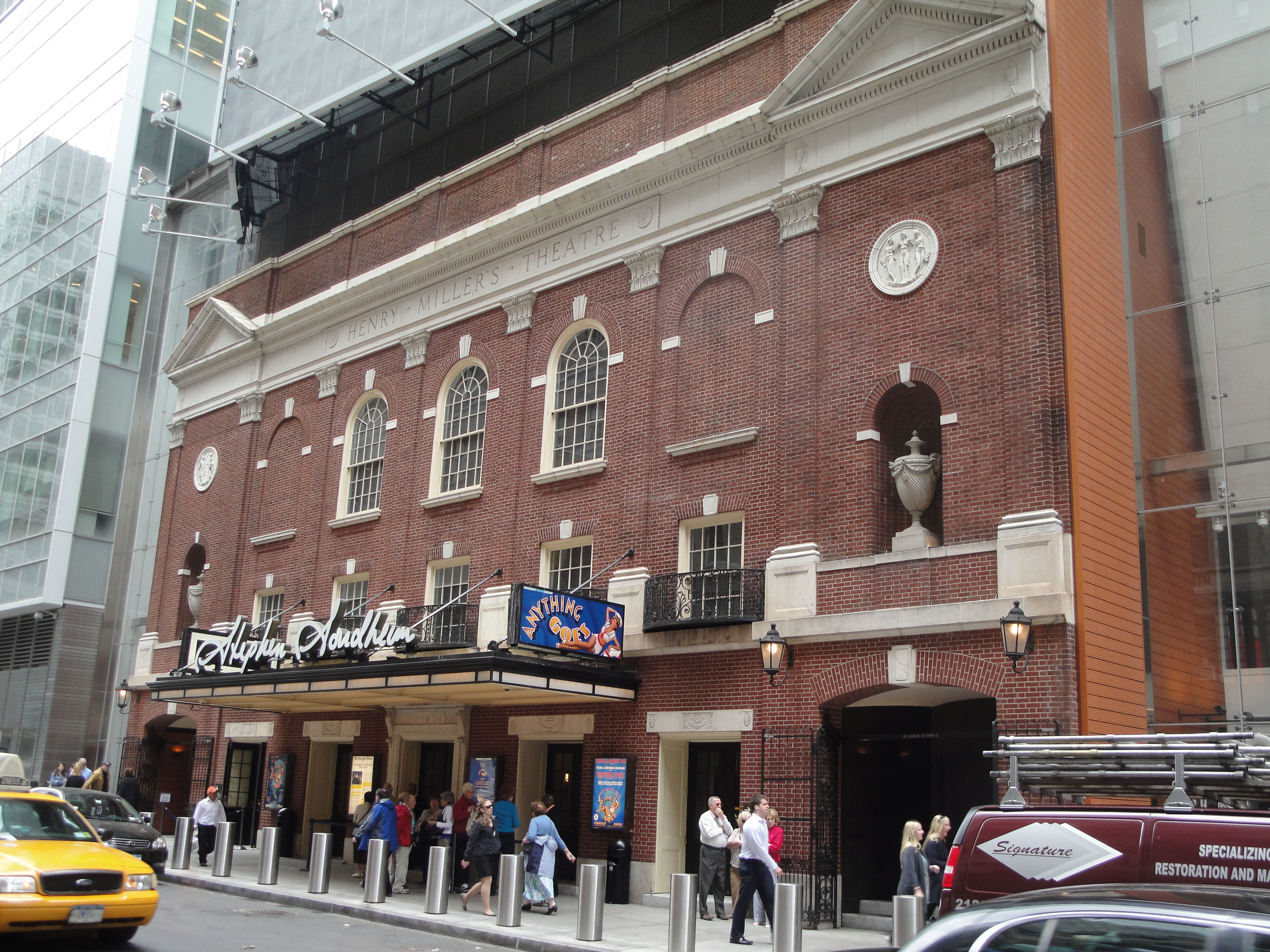
- (2011)
- Interactive map of Stephen Sondheim Theatre
- Address: 124 West 43rd Street; Manhattan, New York; United States
- Coordinates: 40°45′21″N 73°59′06″W
- Owner: Durst Organization
- Operator: Roundabout Theatre Company
- Capacity: 1,055
- Type: Broadway
- Production: & Juliet
- Public transit: Subway: Times Square–42nd Street/Port Authority Bus Terminal or 42nd Street–Bryant Park/Fifth Avenue

Construction
- Opened: October 15, 2009 (17 years ago)
- Rebuilt: 2004-2009
- Years active: 1918-1968; 2001-2004; 2009-2010 (Henry Miller's Theatre); 1998 (as Kit Kat Club); 2010-present (Stephen Sondheim Theatre)

Website
- www.roundabouttheatre.org/theatres-and-venues/stephen-sondheim-theatre/

New York City Landmark
- Designated: July 14, 1987
- Reference no.: 1357
- Designated entity: Facade

The Stephen Sondheim Theatre, formerly Henry Miller's Theatre, is a Broadway theater at 124 West 43rd Street in the Theater District of Midtown Manhattan in New York City, U.S. Owned by the Durst Organization and managed by the Roundabout Theatre Company, the modern 1,055-seat theater opened in 2009 at the base of the Bank of America Tower. The current theater is mostly underground and was designed by COOKFOX, architects of the Bank of America Tower, with Adamson Associates Architects as architect of record. It retains the landmarked facade of the original Henry Miller's Theatre, which was built in 1918 by Henry Miller, the actor and producer.

The original 950-seat theater was designed in the neoclassical style by Harry Creighton Ingalls of Ingalls & Hoffman, in conjunction with Paul R. Allen. Its facade is protected as a city landmark by the New York City Landmarks Preservation Commission. It was managed by Henry Miller along with Elizabeth Milbank Anderson and Klaw & Erlanger. After Miller's death in 1926, his son Gilbert Miller took over operation. The Miller family sold the theater in 1966 to the Nederlander Organization, who sold it in 1968 to Seymour Durst. The final musical production at the theater closed in 1969. It served as a porn theater through much of the 1970s, then operated as a discotheque called Xenon from 1978 to 1984, and subsequently operated as a nightclub under various names in the 1980s and 1990s.

Henry Miller's Theatre reopened as a Broadway house in 1998, when Roundabout staged a revival of Cabaret, during which it was advertised as the Kit Kat Klub, the musical's fictional venue. Cabaret transferred to Studio 54 later that year, and the theater briefly operated as a nightclub in 1999 and 2000. The dystopian musical Urinetown played in the venue from 2001 to 2004. Afterward, the auditorium was demolished, and the modern theater, originally retaining the Henry Miller's name, opened in 2009. The theater was renamed for American composer and lyricist Stephen Sondheim on his 80th birthday in 2010.

== Design ==
The Stephen Sondheim Theatre is on 124 West 43rd Street, at the base of the Bank of America Tower, in the Theater District of Midtown Manhattan in New York City, New York, U.S. It was originally known as Henry Miller's Theatre and was designed in the neo-Georgian style by Paul R. Allen with Ingalls & Hoffman, a firm composed of Harry Creighton Ingalls and F. Burrall Hoffman Jr. Though listed as an architect of record, Hoffman was not involved with the theater's design, having enlisted in the military when Ingalls and Allen began designing the theater. The theater was originally named for its builder, English-born actor-producer Henry Miller; since 2010, it has been named for composer and lyricist Stephen Sondheim (1930–2021). While the facade dates from Allen and Ingalls & Hoffman's original design in 1918, the auditorium and other internal spaces date to a 2009 reconstruction.

=== Facade ===
The facade is made of red brick and white marble. Miller had conceived of the theater building as the ideal "American theatre", but the facade took significant inspiration from English theater, and even the neo-Georgian decoration was meant to evoke the English origins of American drama. A writer for Architectural Record wrote that the design appeared to be at least partially inspired by the architecture of the Drury Lane Theatre. Unlike most theaters of its time, Henry Miller's Theatre had windows on its street-facing facade, illuminating what were originally offices. The original facade still exists but only serves as an entrance to the rebuilt theater underground. The facade protrudes from the Bank of America Tower's glass curtain wall, which surrounds it on all sides.

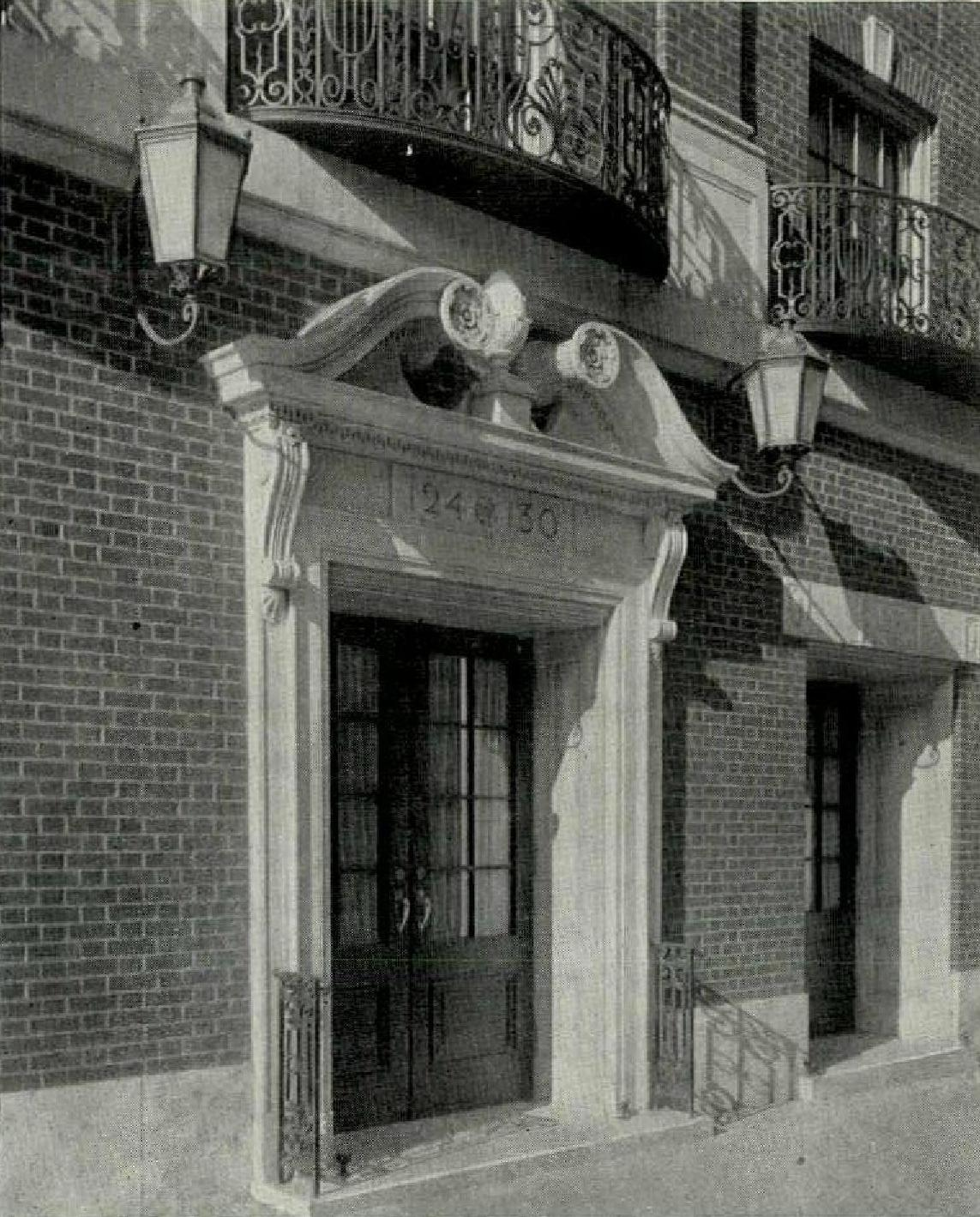
Center ground-story entryway, seen in 1918

The theater's ground-story facade consists of a water table made of granite, above which is a brick facade. There are five rectangular doorways at the center of the facade, each containing a recessed pair of metal doors; above these doorways are stone lintels with urn symbols flanked by rosettes. When the theater was built, the three center doorways led to a box office lobby; the leftmost doorway led to the balcony; and the rightmost doorway led to the gallery. There is a marquee above the three center bays of the ground story. As of September 2010, the marquee displays the words "Stephen Sondheim", reflecting its rename from Henry Miller's Theatre.

Henry Miller's Theatre was the first Broadway theater to be built under the 1916 Zoning Resolution, which is reflected in its design. Where previous Broadway theaters had to contain open-air alleys on either side, Henry Miller's Theatre concealed its alleys behind the extreme ends of either facade. Accordingly, the five center doorways are flanked by a pair of segmental-arched gateways with wrought-iron gates. The gateways have paneled keystones above their centers and wrought-iron lanterns flanking each side.

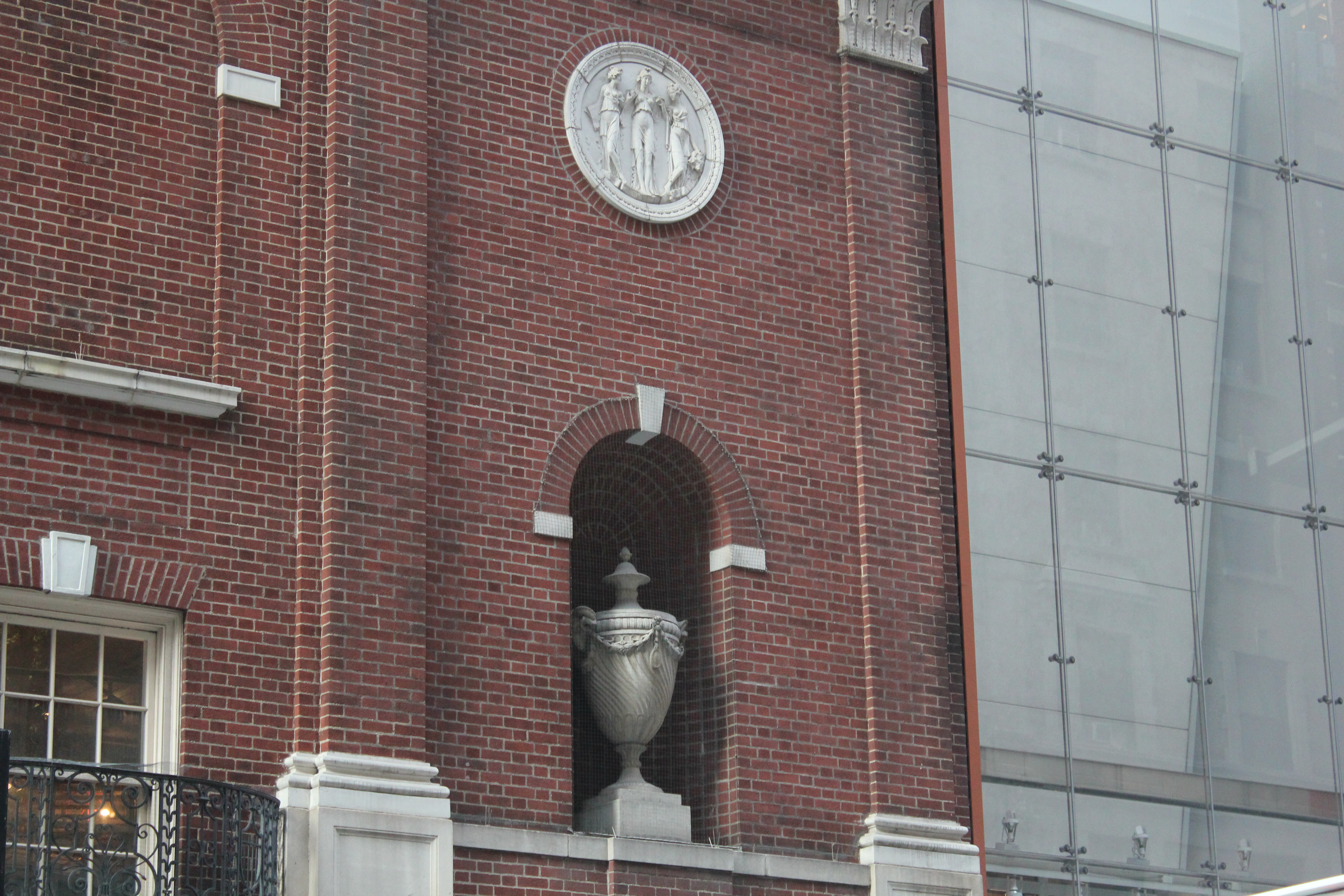
Detail of the side bays

The rest of the facade is made of red brick in common bond and is split into two end pavilions flanking five vertical bays. Each bay is delineated by projecting brick pilasters topped by decorated Corinthian-style capitals of terracotta. The five center bays have rectangular window openings at the second story, with stone keystones and brick voussoirs atop each window, as well as iron balconies curving outward. On the third story, there are three round-arched windows at the center, flanked by two blind openings with brick infill; they also have stone keystones and brick voussoirs. The end pavilions have arched brick niches at the second story and terracotta roundels on the third story. Above that is a terracotta frieze with the name "Henry Miller's Theatre" carved in the center and triangular pediments above the end pavilions. A parapet runs at the roof of the facade. Above the theater facade is a billboard attached to the Bank of America Tower's curtain wall.

=== Interior ===
==== Original design ====
Original theater as seen in the Architectural Forum (August 1918)

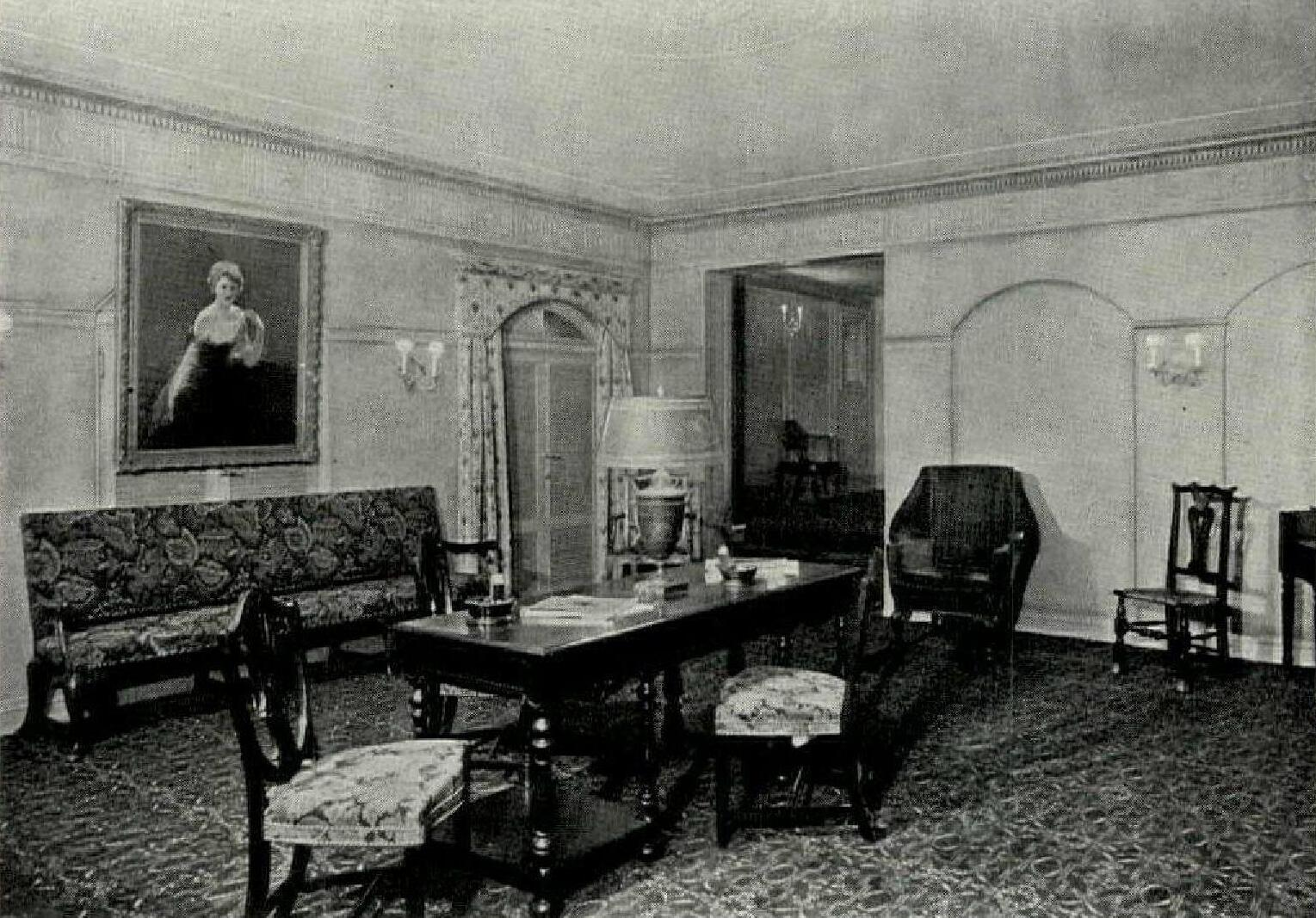
Lounge

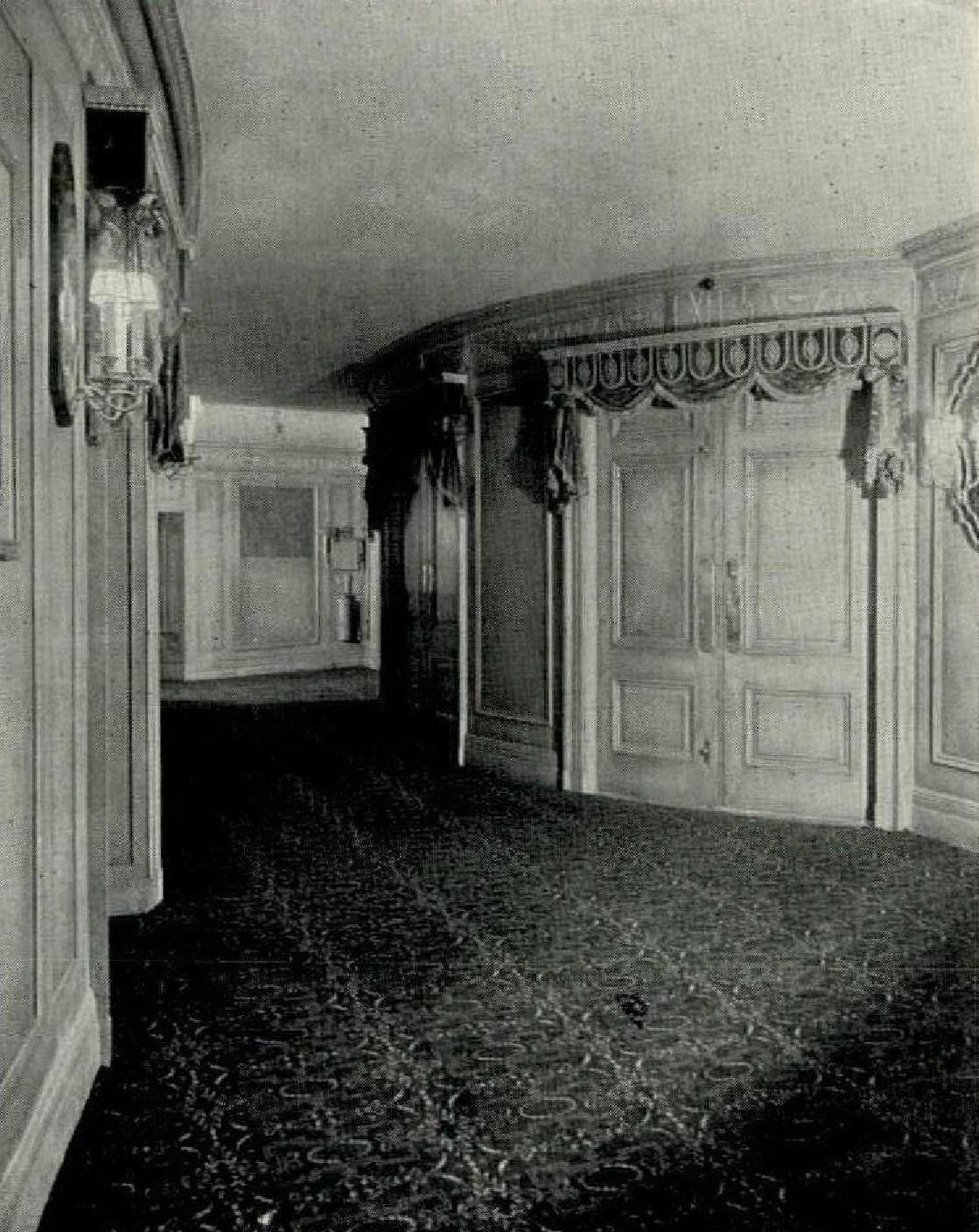
Foyer

The interior was designed similarly to old English rooms in the Adam style. The box-office lobby was an elliptical space. The walls were cream-colored with mauve glazing and were decorated with a molding, a plaster cornice, and lighting fixtures. The box-office lobby had a floor of black and white marble, and the ceiling was made of plaster. The metal grilles and fixtures were painted in dark colors, while the doors were a dark ivory shade. Three doorways from the box-office lobby led to a shallow foyer running across the rear of the auditorium's orchestra. The foyer had bright-blue walls similar to those along the stairways and passageways. Stairs at either end of the foyer descended to the lounge, and another stair on the right side ascended to the balcony. The stairs between the foyer and lounge contained landings, which led to a ladies' retiring room and gentlemen's smoking room. The lounge had English green walls with silk hangings; its design elements included an onyx-and-crystal candelabra. Different designs of light fixtures were used for the foyer and lounge, but they had similarly designed black carpets with green and rose decorations.

The original auditorium had 950 seats. It was semicircular and designed with what Miller considered an "intimate" feel. The parquet level was outfitted with 404 seats, even though the back row had to be removed because of the presence of the lobby behind it. The original auditorium included two balcony levels, the higher level being the "gallery". The second balcony was included because Miller had only been able to afford balcony seats in his youth. Many older and larger theaters of the time had two balconies, but newer or smaller theaters only contained one balcony. The lower balcony level had boxes, which Miller had initially planned to exclude from the design, though he ultimately decided upon making them inconspicuous. The gallery level, on the same level as Miller's office, had an elevator so people could reach the gallery easily. There were 200 seats in the gallery. The auditorium's carpets had a black background with colorful patterns, a contrast to contemporary theaters that had monochrome carpets. The auditorium also had gray walls, hand-painted panels, and brightly colored plaster medallions and swags. Illumination was provided by central chandeliers as well as lights in the boxes.

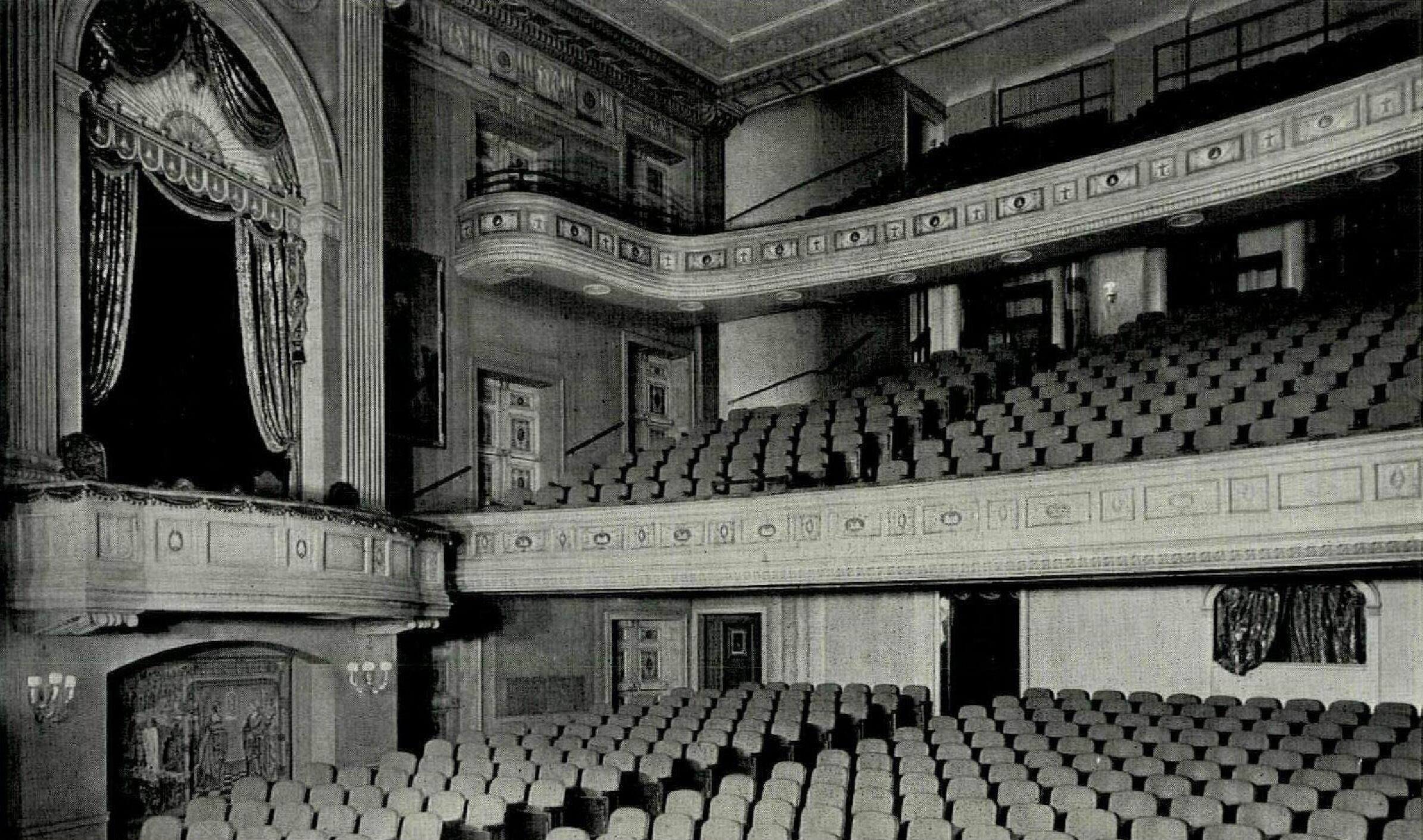
Original auditorium

The front of the auditorium had a wooden orchestra pit separated from the audience by a curved screen. The music came from louvers at the top of the screen. A pianist in the pit operated a choral cello, sounds from which were piped throughout the auditorium. The stage was 33 feet (10 m) wide and had an amber brocade curtain. Above the curtain was a medallion with personifications of comedy and tragedy. The left side of the stage contained its "working side", where stage directions were given, while the right side contained the dressing rooms. The rear of the stage had an additional space with a low ceiling. A counterweight system was installed over the stage, which obviated the requirement for a fly system. A switchboard controlled the lights above the stage.

==== 2009 reconstruction ====
From 2004 to 2009, the old theater was replaced with a 1,055-seat theater designed by COOKFOX, architects of the Bank of America Tower, with Adamson Associates Architects as the architect of record. The rebuilt theater covers 50,000 square feet (4,600 m^{2}). Severud and Tishman had to excavate up to 70 feet (21 m) below street level, since the new auditorium could not rise above the old facade. This makes the theater one of two subterranean houses on Broadway. (Note: The Circle in the Square Theatre is in the basement of Paramount Plaza.) The ground-level entrance contains the mezzanine, with the orchestra level located below. The ground level has a bar and cafe, and there is an upper mezzanine with a restaurant. Two-thirds of the seating, as well as a lobby bar, are at orchestra level. The interior retains artifacts from the original structure. These artifacts include the original emergency-exit doors and the plaster frieze from the auditorium.

The theater's interior was designed to meet Leadership in Energy and Environmental Design (LEED) Gold green-building standards. The environmental features include recycled wall panels, locally quarried marble, and waterless urinals. This makes the Stephen Sondheim Theatre the first Broadway theater to meet LEED standards. The rebuilt theater's design was influenced by input from numerous government agencies, theatre companies, and other organizations. For instance, the women's restroom was designed with 22 stalls, three times the number required under building code, and the men's restroom was designed with 10 stalls, one and a half times the code requirement. In addition, the Stephen Sondheim is fully accessible under the Americans with Disabilities Act of 1990, with 20 viewing stations, a drinking fountain, and a restroom for disabled guests.

== History ==
Times Square became the epicenter for large-scale theater productions between 1900 and the Great Depression. Manhattan's theater district had begun to shift from Union Square and Madison Square during the first decade of the 20th century. From 1901 to 1920, forty-three theaters were built around Broadway in Midtown Manhattan, including Henry Miller's Theatre.

=== Original theater ===
Henry Miller had held a lifelong dream of operating a theater. In December 1916, he announced his intention to build a theater on a plot at 124-130 West 43rd Street, next to the established theater district on Times Square. The site measured 85.9 by 100.5 feet (26.2 by 30.6 m) and had previously been proposed as the site of an unbuilt theater by Felix Isman. Miller had leased the lot from its owner, Elizabeth Milbank Anderson. Paul Allen and Ingalls & Hoffman were hired for the design. Allen had been involved in the project partially because Miller had a history of working with Allen's sister, actress Viola Allen.

==== Early years ====
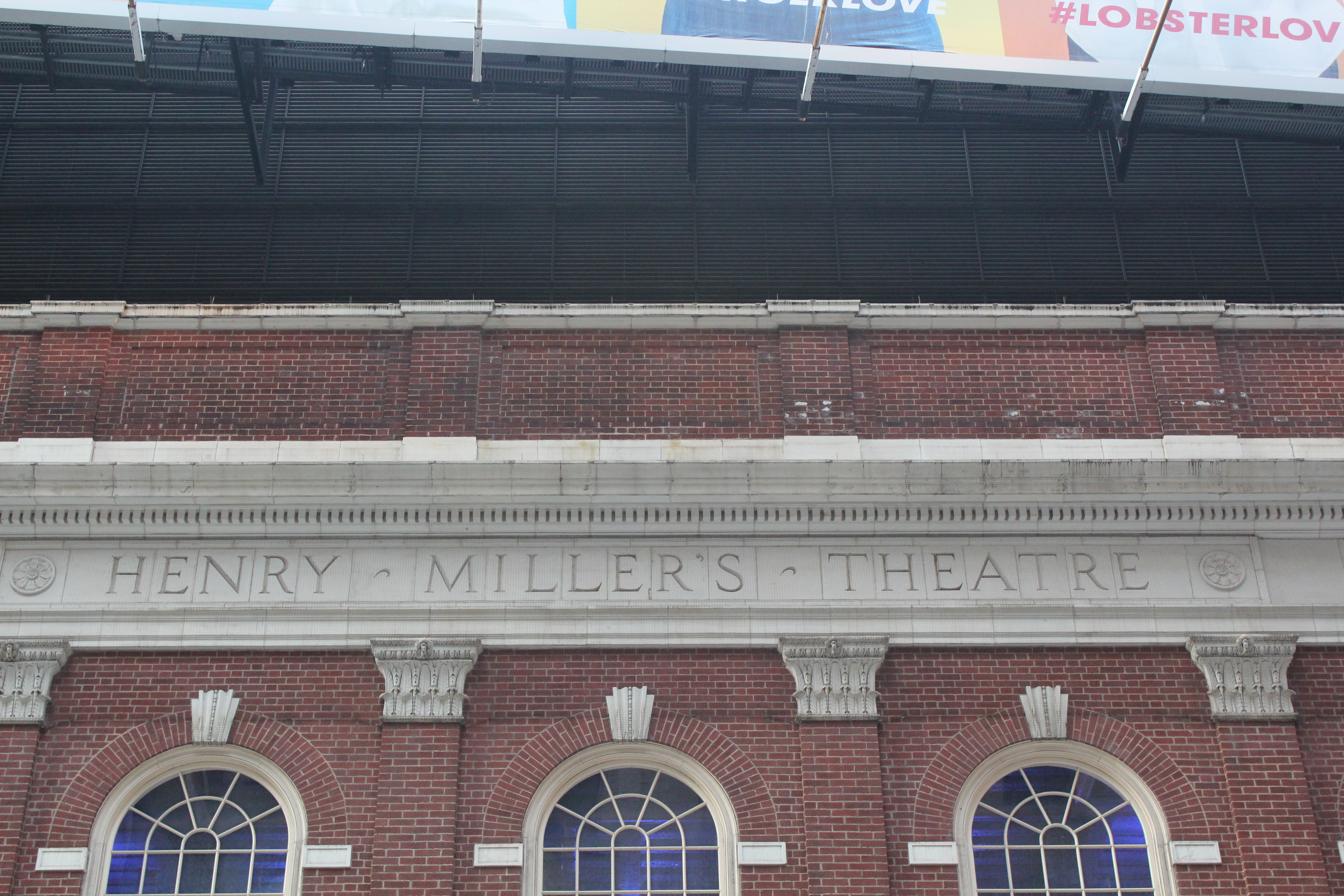
Detail of the top of the facade, with the name "Henry Miller's Theatre" inscribed

Henry Miller's Theatre opened on April 1, 1918, hosting the play The Fountain of Youth, in which Miller himself starred. John Corbin wrote for The New York Times that the new theater was "of the ideal size and shape" and that "the decorations are at once rich and in the perfection of good taste". Heywood Broun of the New-York Tribune said the theater "is a delight if you don't mind the curtain too much". The Brooklyn Times-Union subsequently said the theater was "a memorial worthy of any man" even if Miller did not have further accomplishments in his lifetime. The Fountain of Youth itself was a flop, as was the play that succeeded it, The Marriage of Convenience. That July, Klaw & Erlanger agreed to jointly manage the theater with Miller.

Most of the early productions were flops, until Mis' Nelly of N'Orleans, which opened in 1919 and had 127 performances. The musical La La Lucille, which opened in May 1919, was also a success, even though the theater had to close during the 1919 Actors' Equity Association strike. Miller ultimately starred in eight productions at the theater during his lifetime, including The Famous Mrs. Fair (1918), and The Changelings (1923). During the early 1920s, Henry Miller's Theatre hosted the Broadway debuts of Leslie Howard in Just Suppose (1920) as well as Noël Coward in The Vortex (1925). Other actors and actresses to perform at the Henry Miller included Alfred Lunt and Billie Burke in The Awful Truth (1922), Ina Claire in Romeo and Juliet (1923), and Jane Cowl and Dennis King in Quarantine (1924). Meanwhile, Elizabeth Milbank Anderson had died in 1921, and the lease on the underlying land was transferred to the City Real Estate Company. Miller, the theater's lessee, subleased the theater for five years to himself and A. L. Erlanger in June 1924.

==== Gilbert Miller operation ====
Henry Miller died in 1926, and his son Gilbert took over management of the theater. As trustee of his father's estate, Gilbert filed a lawsuit to cancel Erlanger's sublease of the theater. Miller argued that he did not have the power to reassign his father's stake in the sublease to himself, and Erlanger was refusing to vouch for him. As a result, shows at Henry Miller's Theatre were transferred to the Shubert Theatre while the litigation was pending. Gilbert Miller ultimately bought Erlanger's interest and paid 25 percent of the gross profit from each production to the Milbank Memorial Fund, Anderson's legatee. Performances at Henry Miller's Theatre around this time included The Play's The Thing (1926), Our Betters (1928), and Journey's End (1929).

Henry Miller's Theatre was most successful from the 1930s through 1950s. In the early 1930s, the theater hosted The Good Fairy (1931), with Helen Hayes and Walter Connolly; The Late Christopher Bean (1932), with Pauline Lord; and Personal Appearance (1934), with Gladys George. Other notable plays in that decade included a revival of The Country Wife (1936) and French Without Tears (1937). The Henry Miller briefly hosted Our Town in 1938 before the play was moved to the Morosco Theatre. The Henry Miller's productions in the early 1940s included Ladies in Retirement (1940) with Flora Robson and Estelle Winwood, Spring Again (1941) with Grace George, and Harriet (1943) with Helen Hayes. By the theater's twenty-fifth anniversary in 1943, Henry Miller's Theatre had hosted 83 plays and one musical, La La Lucille. Later in the decade, the theater showed Dear Ruth in 1944 and Born Yesterday from 1948 to 1950.

The Henry Miller presented The Cocktail Party in 1950 with Alec Guinness, Cathleen Nesbitt, and Irene Worth and The Moon Is Blue in 1951 with Barbara Bel Geddes and Barry Nelson. This was followed in 1953 by Oh, Men! Oh, Women!, which ran for a year. The Living Room also opened at the Henry Miller in November 1954 but, after a month, was replaced by Witness for the Prosecution, which ran until 1956. Other notable shows and performances in the 1950s included The Reluctant Debutante (1956); Hotel Paradiso (1957) with Bert Lahr and Angela Lansbury; Under Milk Wood (1957); Look After Lulu! (1959) with Tammy Grimes, and The Andersonville Trial (1959) with George C. Scott and Albert Dekker. The early 1960s saw performances such as The World of Carl Sandburg (1960) with Bette Davis; Under the Yum Yum Tree (1960) with Gig Young; and Enter Laughing (1963) with Alan Arkin and Vivian Blaine. The 416-performance run of Enter Laughing was followed by a series of flops, some with as few as five performances.

==== Late 1960s through 1980s ====
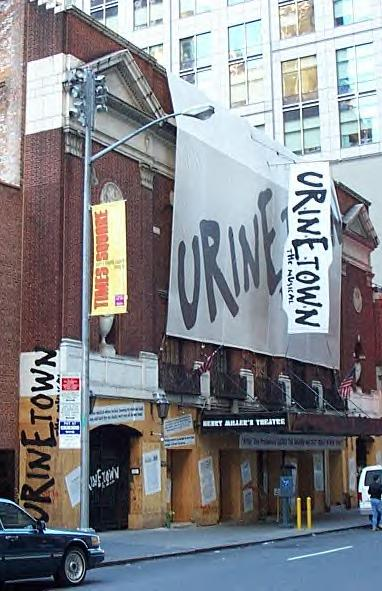
Seen in 2007

In April 1966, Gilbert Miller's wife offered the theater for sale for $1 million, saying she did not want her 81-year-old husband to "work hard as a producer" in his old age. Theatrical director Elia Kazan and his lawyer H. William Fitelson were reportedly interested in buying the Henry Miller. Instead, that November, the Millers sold the theater to the Nederlanders for $500,000. This was not the high offer that the Millers had received, but the buyers had promised to retain the "Henry Miller" name. The marquee outside the theater was installed around this time. The off-off-Broadway venue Circle in the Square took a one-year lease on the Henry Miller in May 1968, to start that August. The theater became known as "Circle in the Square on Broadway" and was planned to show feature films. The Circle only ran two shows at the venue, both of which were flops.

The Nederlander Organization sold the Henry Miller in 1968 to Seymour Durst, who leased the theater back to the Nederlanders. Durst wanted to redevelop the entire city block but, over the following three decades, failed to carry out several proposals for the block. After the Circle's lease was terminated in January 1969, James M. Nederlander leased the theater to "movie exhibitor" Maurice Maurer. The production But, Seriously, which ran for three days the following month, was the last multi-day production at the theater for nearly three decades. The theater was renamed the Park-Miller and began showing "feature films" in 1970. According to theatrical historian Ken Bloom, the Park-Miller aired male pornographic films. Two years later, the theater was leased to the Avon chain of theaters, becoming Avon-on-the Hudson. Through 1977, the theater was still showing porn films. The Durst Organization retook operation of the theater later that year and renovated it.

In June 1978, the old Henry Miller's Theatre reopened as a discotheque called Xenon. The disco was outfitted with a descending neon panel on the ceiling. Xenon hosted one play, The Ritz, which had exactly one performance on May 2, 1983. Xenon operated until either 1983 or 1984. The old theater reopened as the nightclub Shout in August 1985. The nightclub featured music from the 1950s and 60s, and the auditorium had decorations including a full-sized Cadillac projecting from the wall of the stage. The New York City Landmarks Preservation Commission (LPC) had started considering protecting the Henry Miller as an official city landmark in 1982, with discussions continuing over the next several years. The LPC designated the Henry Miller's exterior as a city landmark on December 8, 1987, though the interior was merely "tabled" for later consideration. This was part of the LPC's wide-ranging effort in 1987 to grant landmark status to Broadway theaters. The New York City Board of Estimate ratified the designations in March 1988.

==== 1990s and 2000s ====
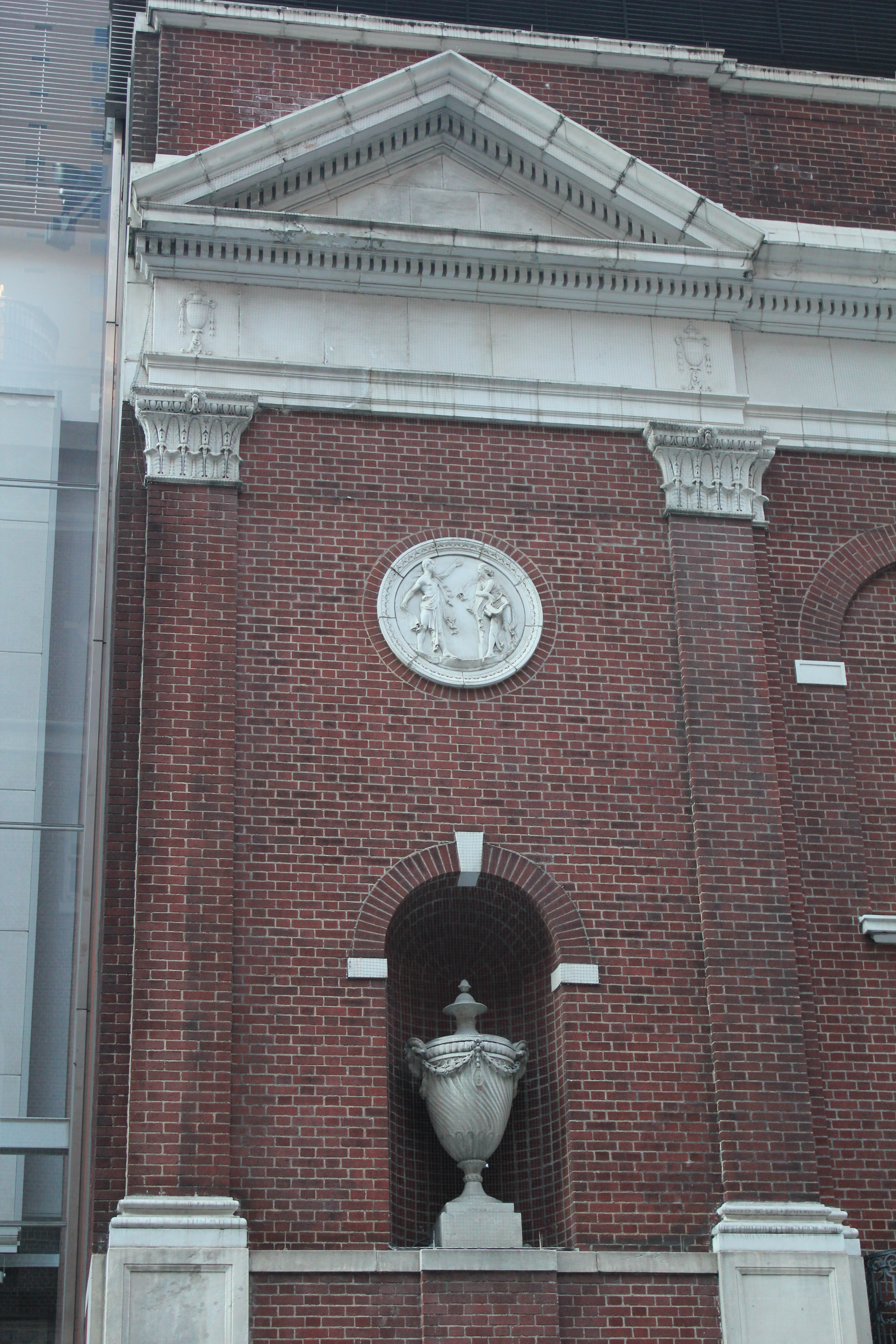
View of an end bay on the facade

The Shout nightclub had closed by September 1991, when the theater reopened as the City nightclub. The nightclub was shuttered before 1994; that March, the old theater was described as being boarded up. In September 1994, it was announced that the nightclub Club Expo would open in the old Henry Miller. The space was decorated with elements, such as monorails and holograms, based on a futuristic conception from the 1939 New York World's Fair.

Club Expo was renovated in late 1997 and reopened the following March as the Kit Kat Club, a "club within a club" concept. Named after the Berlin nightclub in the 1966 musical Cabaret, the Kit Kat Club housed Roundabout Theatre Company's popular revival of the musical. After hours, the location served as a popular nightclub with burlesque entertainment and dancing. In July 1998, a nearby construction accident temporarily closed the building, forcing Roundabout to relocate to Studio 54 to finish their production. That November, the production permanently moved to Studio 54. Douglas Durst of the Durst Organization had wanted to use the Henry Miller as a theater again. The Kit Kat Klub's operators sued Durst and Roundabout in November 1998, claiming that Roundabout had committed breach of contract by moving to Studio 54. At the end of the month, Durst terminated the club's lease.

The show Rolling on the TOBA opened at the Kit Kat Klub in March 1999. Its opening was delayed by ongoing eviction proceedings against the Kit Kat Klub, as Durst claimed that the club was violating its lease by booking TOBA without his permission. TOBA relocated to the Vivian Beaumont Theater the next month after the Tony Awards administration committee ruled that shows at the venue were not eligible for the Tony Awards. After a protracted legal dispute, the New York Supreme Court ordered that the Kit Kat Klub vacate the theater in August 1999. The Henry Miller continued to operate as a nightclub and a venue for private parties until it closed in April 2000. Before its closure, the club had seen several crimes, including a December 1999 incident in which rapper Jay-Z stabbed a promoter.

By December 2000, The New York Times described the Henry Miller as being dilapidated, with dangling wires in the ceiling and a "carpet is so grubby that patrons are allowed to drink their Weissbier in the theater". Around that time, the theater was rechristened the Henry Miller and was renovated with 640 seats and a new air-conditioning system. After multiple delays, including a delay caused by the September 11 attacks, Urinetown opened in September 2001, running for two years. By late 2003, Durst was planning to develop a new skyscraper on the site in conjunction with Bank of America. Durst notified the theater's operators that the Henry Miller's would have to be closed and demolished to make way for the construction of the 55-story Bank of America Tower. The original theater closed in January 2004.

=== Current theater ===
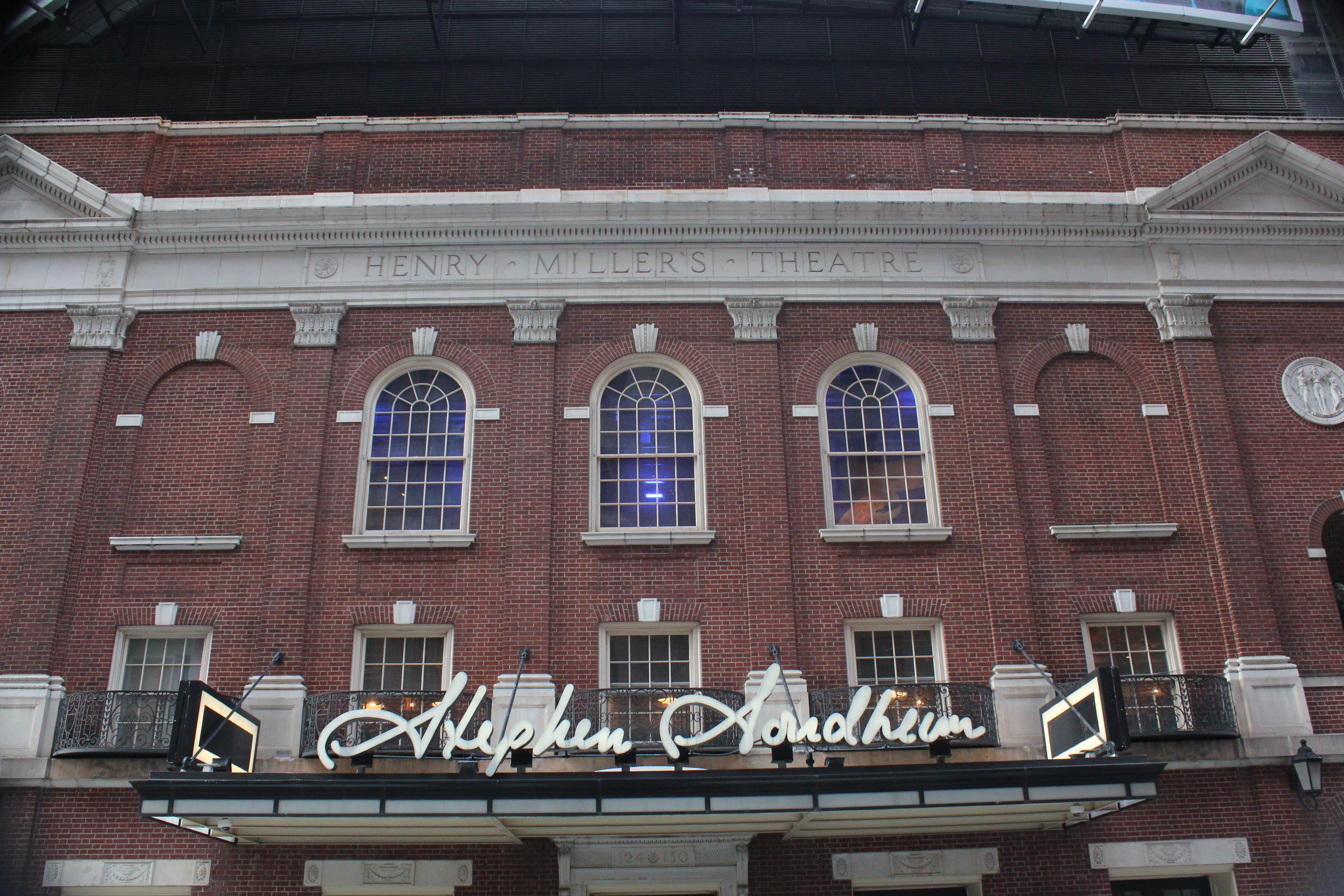
New entrance marquee

Because of the theater's landmark status, Durst and Bank of America had to avoid damaging the facade under threat of financial penalty. In addition, the new theater had to be placed underground because it could not rise higher than the height of the old facade. The landmark facade was temporarily attached to a three-story steel support frame when the tower was built. By late 2004, the frame had been constructed. The theater's interior was demolished using manual tools, and the contractors installed sensors to detect any vibrations on the facade. Some of the old auditorium's seats became part of a Pennsylvania bowling alley.

Roundabout announced in 2007 that it would operate the theater, which would become its third Broadway venue. By the middle of the following year, the scaffolding over the facade was being dismantled. In May 2009, Roundabout announced that Henry Miller's Theatre would reopen that September with a revival production of the musical Bye Bye Birdie. The theater reopened with a preview performance of Bye Bye Birdie on September 10, 2009; the production ran for three months. The other major production to run at the new Henry Miller's Theatre prior to its renaming was All About Me, featuring Dame Edna and Michael Feinstein; it played a limited engagement in early 2010.

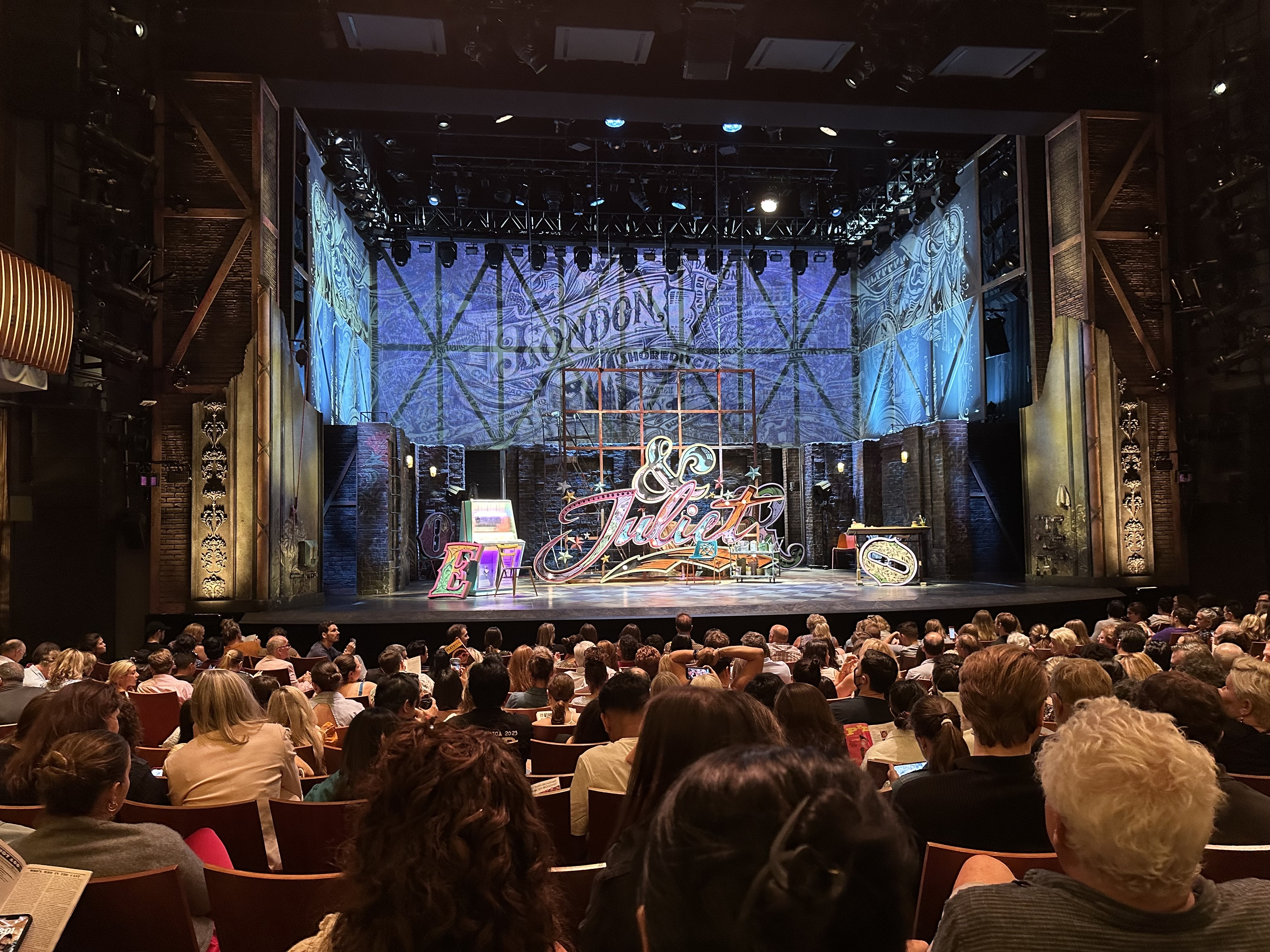
& Juliet at the Stephen Sondheim Theatre in July 2023

On March 22, 2010, the 80th birthday of American composer and lyricist Stephen Sondheim, Roundabout announced that Henry Miller's Theatre would be renamed in Sondheim's honor. The official unveiling and lighting of the marquee of the new Stephen Sondheim Theatre took place in a ceremony on September 15, 2010. The first production at the newly renamed theater was The Pee-wee Herman Show, which played a limited ten-week engagement. The Stephen Sondheim then hosted a revival of Anything Goes, which opened in 2011 and lasted for one year. The Trip to Bountiful then opened at the theater in 2013, followed by Beautiful: The Carole King Musical, which ran from 2014 to 2019 The Stephen Sondheim also hosted Slava's Snowshow at the end of 2019. All Broadway theaters temporarily closed on March 12, 2020, due to the COVID-19 pandemic. The Stephen Sondheim reopened on October 21, 2021, with performances of Mrs. Doubtfire, which ran until May 2022. The musical & Juliet then opened at the Stephen Sondheim in November 2022 and is scheduled to close in January 2027. A limited-run revival of The Odd Couple starring Steve Carell and John C. Reily is scheduled to open in March 2027.

== Notable productions ==
Productions are listed by the year of their first performance. This list only includes Broadway shows; it does not include films screened at the theater.

=== Henry Miller's Theatre ===
Notable productions at the theater
Opening year	Name	Refs.
1918	Daddy Long Legs	
1919	La La Lucille	
1919	Moonlight and Honeysuckle	
1919	The Famous Mrs. Fair	
1920	Just Suppose	
1922	The Awful Truth	
1923	Romeo and Juliet	
1924	L'Aiglon	
1925	The Poor Nut	
1925	The Vortex	
1926	Raquel Meller	
1926	The Play's the Thing	
1927	The Baby Cyclone	
1928	Our Betters	
1928	Gentlemen of the Press	
1928	The Sacred Flame	
1929	Journey's End	
1931	The Good Fairy	
1932	The Late Christopher Bean	
1934	Personal Appearance	
1936	The Country Wife	
1937	French Without Tears	
1938	Our Town	
1940	Geneva	
1940	Ladies in Retirement	
1942	Flare Path	
1944	Chicken Every Sunday	
1944	Dear Ruth	
1947	Maurice Chevalier	
1948	Born Yesterday	
1950	The Cocktail Party	
1951	The Moon Is Blue	
1953	The Trip to Bountiful	
1953	Oh, Men! Oh, Women!	
1954	The Living Room	
1954	Witness for the Prosecution	
1956	The Reluctant Debutante	
1957	Hotel Paradiso	
1957	Under Milk Wood	
1957	The Genius and the Goddess	
1957	The Country Wife	
1959	Epitaph for George Dillon	
1959	Look After Lulu!	
1959	The Nervous Set	
1959	The Andersonville Trial	
1960	The World of Carl Sandburg	
1962	Under the Yum Yum Tree	
1962	The Affair	
1963	The Hollow Crown	
1963	Enter Laughing	
1964	The Sign in Sidney Brustein's Window	
1965	The Subject Was Roses	
1967	The Promise	
1968	Before You Go	
1968	Portrait of a Queen	
1968	The Venetian Twins	
1983	The Ritz	
1998	Cabaret	
2001	Urinetown	
2009	Bye Bye Birdie	
2010	All About Me	

=== Stephen Sondheim Theatre ===
Notable productions at the theater
Opening year	Name	Refs.
2010	The Pee-wee Herman Show	
2011	Anything Goes	
2013	The Trip to Bountiful	
2014	Beautiful: The Carole King Musical	
2019	Slava's Snowshow	
2021	Mrs. Doubtfire	
2022	& Juliet	
2027	The Odd Couple	

== Box office record ==
& Juliet set the theater's box-office record, grossing $1,639,788 over nine performances for the week ending January 1, 2023. Previously, the record had been held by Beautiful: The Carole King Musical, which grossed $1,546,950 in 2014.

== See also ==
- List of Broadway theaters
- List of New York City Designated Landmarks in Manhattan from 14th to 59th Streets
