= Bernice Herstein =

American socialite (1918–1950)

- Born: Bernice Charlotte Herstein; September 6, 1918; Scarsdale, New York, U.S.
- Died: November 8, 1950 (aged 32); Scarsdale, New York, U.S.
- Spouse: Seymour Durst (m. 1940)
- Children: 4, including Robert Durst and Douglas Durst

Bernice Herstein (September 6, 1918 – November 8, 1950) was an American socialite, the wife of investor Seymour Durst and mother of their four children Robert, Douglas, Wendy and Thomas Durst.

== Biography ==
Herstein was born into a Jewish family from Germany in Scarsdale, Westchester County, New York, the daughter of David Sanders Herstein. She married Seymour Durst in 1940. She died falling from the roof of the family's Scarsdale home during the middle of the night. An employee had called police on discovering Mrs. Durst had climbed out onto the roof of the three-story house; more than a dozen policemen and firemen responded, and spent half an hour making plans to thwart a potential leap. As one fireman ascended a ladder reaching to the roof, Mrs. Durst "flung herself from the roof and plunged past him", and his attempt to grab her bathrobe failed due to her falling weight. A waiting ambulance took her to hospital, where she was pronounced dead on arrival. Her oldest child Robert (decades later convicted of murder) claimed he was forced to witness the entire event, while Douglas insists all four children were together at a neighbor's house when Herstein perished. Douglas Durst maintains his brother was attempting to blame their father and childhood events for his criminal behavior to garner public sympathy.
