= National Debt Clock =

Debt display in Manhattan, New York

Coordinates: 40.7555°N 73.9848°W

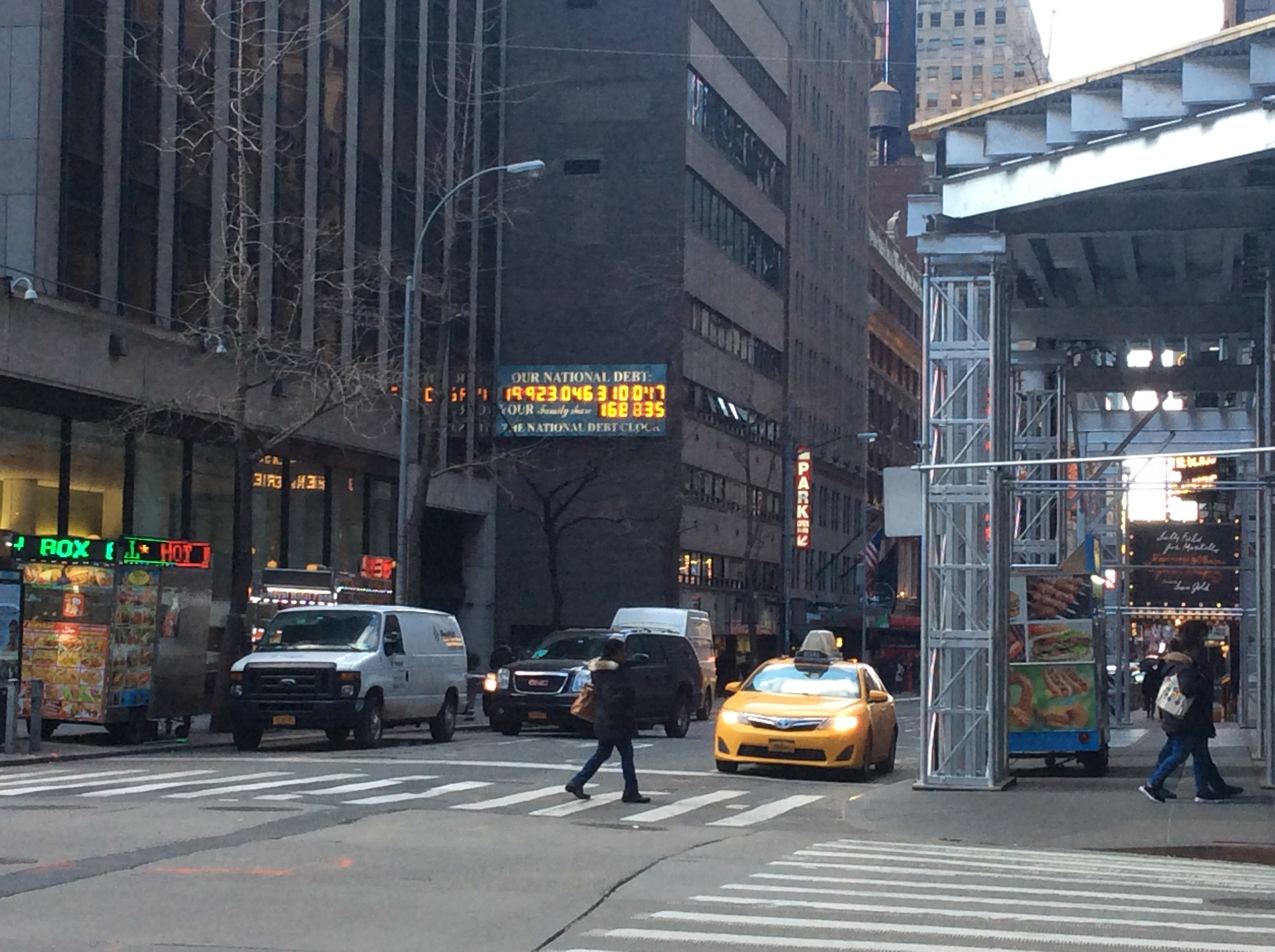
The clock at its former location near Sixth Avenue and 44th Street in February 2017, at which time it read $19.9 trillion in national debt

The National Debt Clock is a billboard-sized running total display that shows the United States gross national debt and each American family's share of the debt. As of 2017, it is installed on the western side of the Bank of America Tower, west of Sixth Avenue between 42nd and 43rd Streets in Manhattan, New York City. It was the first debt clock installed anywhere.

The clock's first incarnation was installed in 1989 on Sixth Avenue between 42nd and 43rd Streets, one block away from Times Square, by New York real estate developer Seymour Durst, who wanted to highlight the rising national debt. In 2004, the clock was dismantled and a new one installed near 44th Street and Sixth Avenue. In 2008, the U.S. national debt exceeded $10 (~$15.00 in 2025) trillion, one more digit than the clock could display. The lit dollar-sign in the clock's leftmost digit position was later changed to the "1" digit to represent the ten-trillionth place. In 2017, the clock was moved to the Bank of America Tower, near the original location.

== Context ==
Seymour's son Douglas said in 2006 that the clock was a non-partisan effort to think about intergenerational equity: "We're a family business. We think generationally, and we don't want to see the next generation crippled by this burden."

Seymour had been toying with the basic idea of drawing attention to the growing national debt since at least 1980. During that year's Christmas and holiday season, he sent cards to senators and congressmen that said "Happy New Year" and telling them their share of the national debt. Sources disagree on the exact amounts mentioned in the cards; The New York Times mentions a figure of $35,000, while The Washington Post mentions a figure of $5,000. In the early 1980s, when Seymour first developed the idea of a constantly updated clock, the technology required to implement the project was not yet available. Back then, the debt was quickly approaching $1 trillion.

== First clock ==
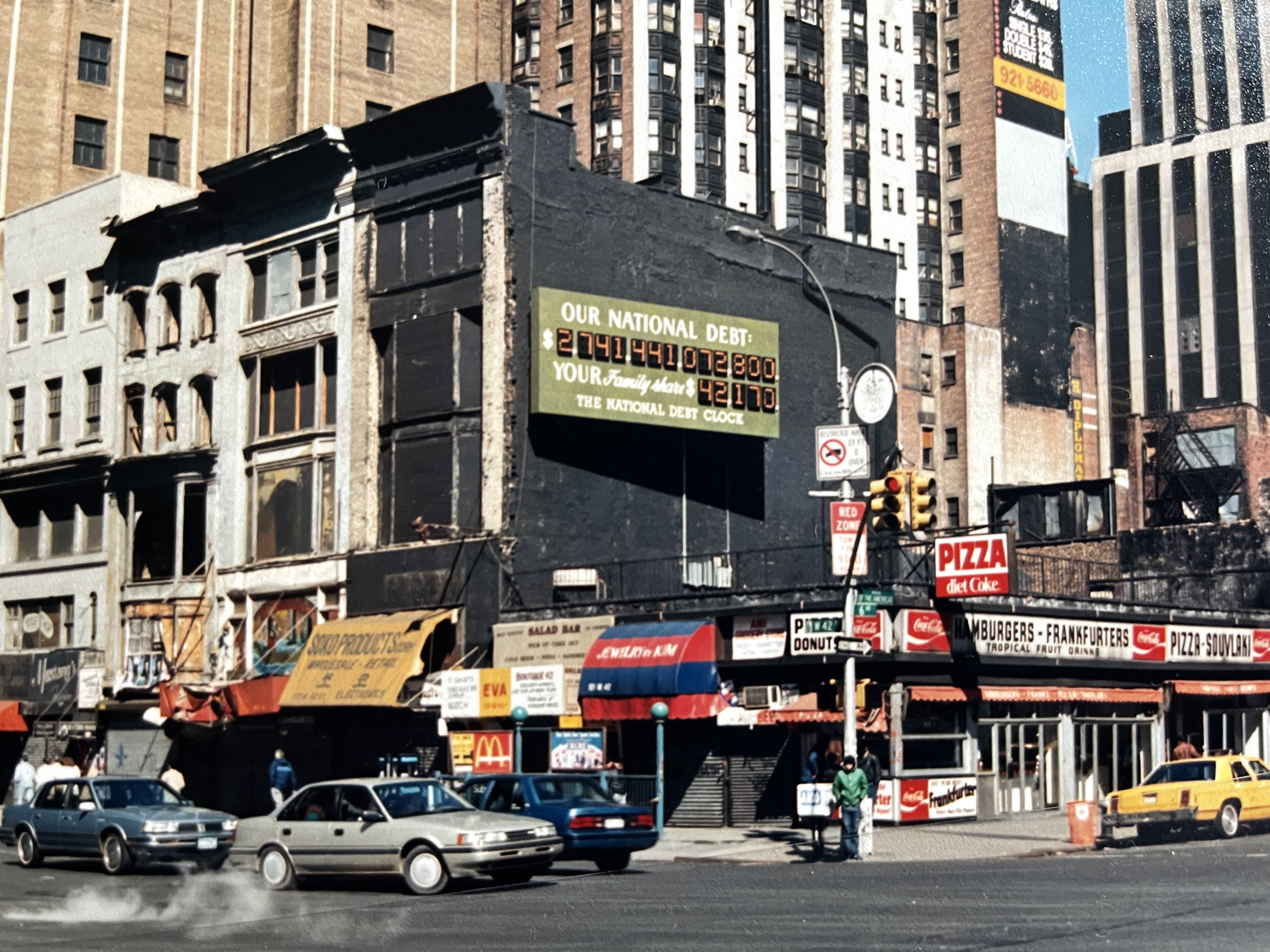
The first clock at the original location near Times Square in March 1989, showing $2,741,441,072,800.

The first National Debt Clock was installed on February 20, 1989. The national debt stood at US$2.7 trillion that year. The original 11-by-26-foot (3.4 m × 7.9 m) clock was constructed at a cost of $100,000. It cost $500 per month to maintain the display's 305 lightbulbs. It was mounted on a now-demolished Durst building at Sixth Avenue near 42nd Street (a block from Times Square), facing the north side of 42nd Street and Bryant Park. Built by the New York sign company Artkraft Strauss, the clock featured a dot-based segment display emulating the then-typical character resolution of 5-by-7. Similar to the second clock, the updating mechanism was such that the display was set to the estimated speed of debt growth (odometer-style) and adjusted weekly according to the latest numbers published by the United States Treasury. Durst vowed that the clock would "be up as long as the debt or the city lasts," and that "if it bothers people, then it's working."

Up until the week before his death in May 1995, Durst himself adjusted the tally via modem. After his death, his son Douglas became president of the Durst Organization, which owns and maintains the clock. Artkraft Strauss has been keeping the figures current since then. On November 15, 1995, the clock stopped counting up for the first time in its six years of operation. As a result of a federal government shutdown, the clock was frozen at a value of $4,985,567,071,200. In 1998, the clock broke down shortly after the numbers surpassed $5.5 (~$10.1 trillion in 2025) trillion. The cause was attributed to the numbers "being too high." In response, Artkraft installed a new computer inside the clock.

In early 2000, the clock started to run backward because the national debt was actually decreasing. It showed a national debt of $5.7 trillion and an individual family share of almost $74,000. With the original purpose of the clock being to highlight the rising debt, the reversal of the figures gave a mixed message, added to the fact that the display not being designed to properly run backward. In May 2000, it was reported that the clock was planned to be unplugged on September 7, 2000, what would have been Seymour Durst's 87th birthday. Douglas said that the decision to unplug the clock was made because "it was put up to focus attention on the increasing national debt, and it's served its purpose." In September, the clock was unplugged and covered with a red-white-and-blue curtain, with the national debt standing at roughly $5.7 trillion. However, less than two years later in July 2002, the curtain was raised and the clock once again picked up tracking a rising debt, starting at $6.1 trillion.

== Second clock ==
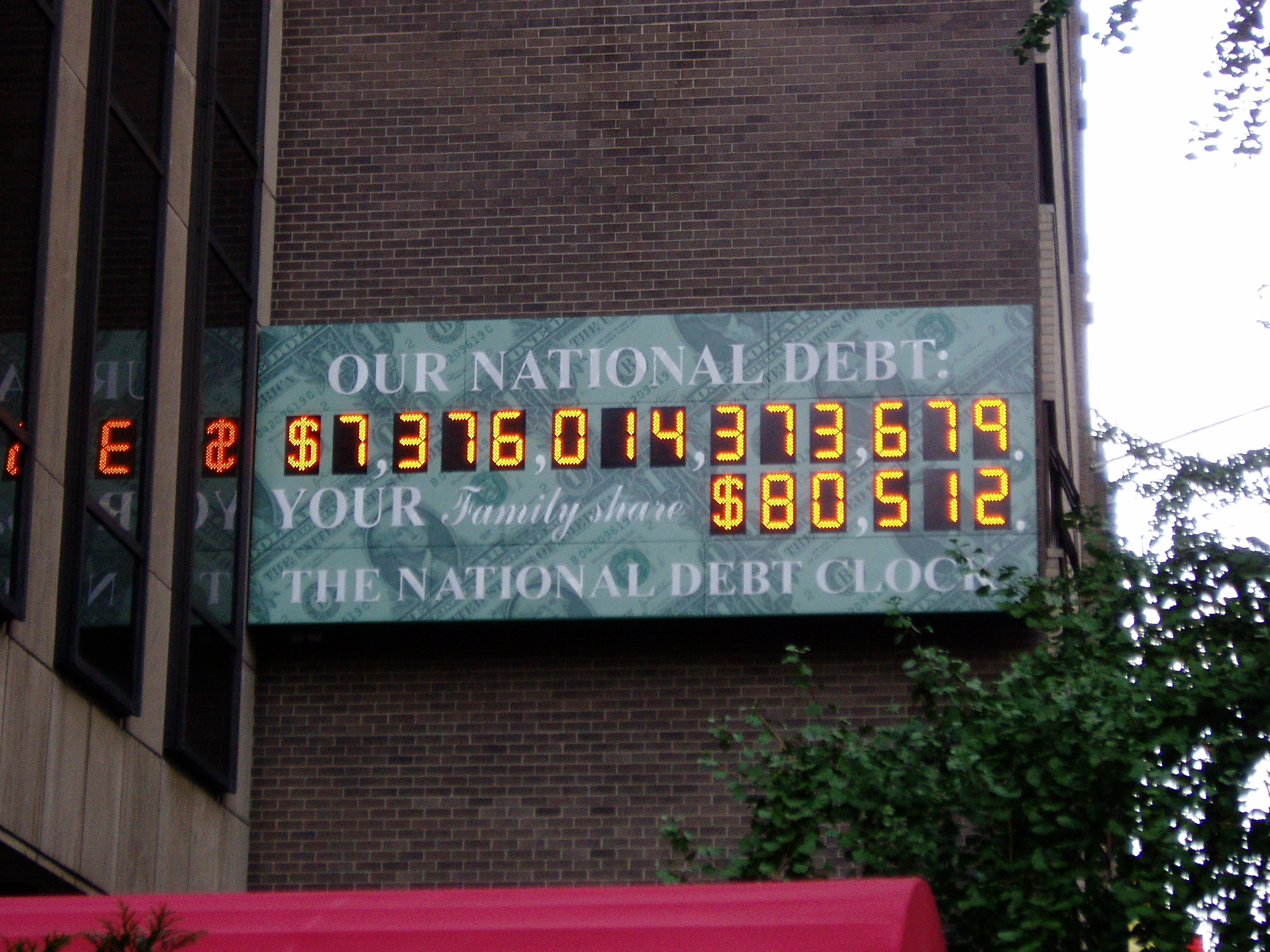
The National Debt Clock on September 24, 2004, showing $7.3 trillion.

In 2004, the original clock was moved from its location near 42nd Street, and the building where the sign had been mounted was demolished so the Bank of America Tower could be built. An updated model was installed one block away on the side of a Durst building at 1133 Avenue of the Americas, facing Sixth Avenue near the southeast corner of the intersection with West 44th Street. The new clock is located next to an Internal Revenue Service office. The new clock, which can run backward, is outfitted with a brighter seven-segment display with multiple LEDs per segment, allowing the numbers to be read more easily.

Amid extensive media attention during the 2008 financial crisis, the National Debt Clock's display ran out of digits when the U.S. gross federal debt rose above US$10 trillion on September 30, 2008. In the farthest-left space, the debt clock displayed the digit "1" in place of the dollar sign.

An overhaul or complete replacement adding two more digits to the clock's display was being planned as of 2008. The clock would be able to show a debt of up to $1 quadrillion.

As of September 2009, Douglas Durst's cousin Jonathan "Jody" Durst was taking over the day-to-day operations as president. In an interview with The New York Times, Jonathan said that maintenance of the clock is planned "for years to come."

In June 2017, the Durst Organization announced that the National Debt Clock would be moved again so that a new entrance for 1133 Avenue of the Americas could be built. The clock was moved to the western side of the Bank of America Tower, facing an alley in the middle of the block between Sixth Avenue and Broadway. It was reinstalled in its new location in November 2017.

== Similar projects ==
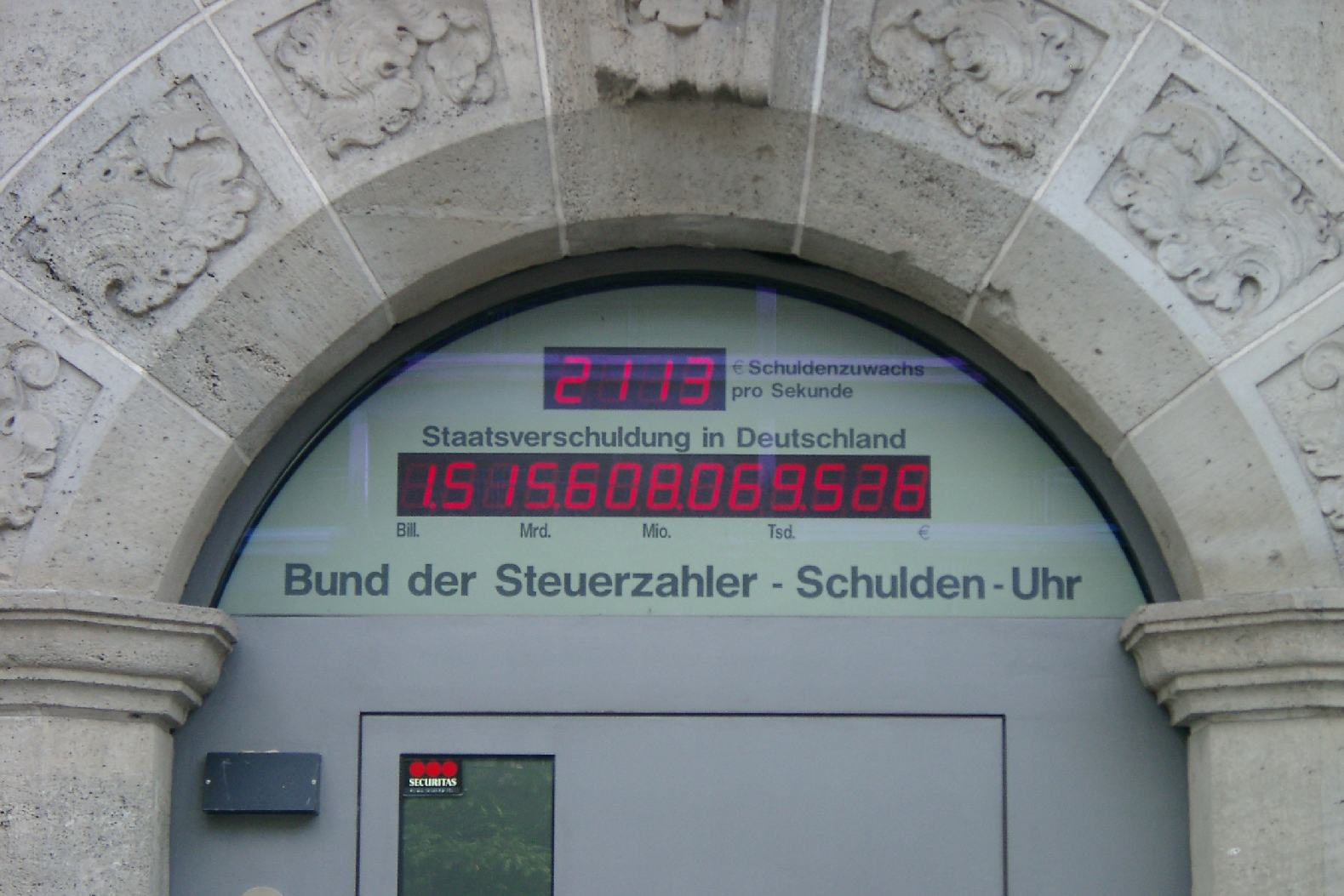
German national debt clock at the Berlin headquarters of taxpayer watchdog group Bund der Steuerzahler

The idea of conveying a message through a periodically updated clock found an earlier expression in the Doomsday Clock. However, the innovation of the National Debt Clock was to feature a constantly running counter; it has since inspired similar projects elsewhere, both in the United States and further afield. In particular, it has become a national fixture shows that the U.S.'s increasing debt. By 1995, the New York Times reported that politicians were citing the clock to advocate for a reduction to the national budget.

The National Debt Clock has also been credited as the inspiration behind other running totalizers, such as an AMD campaign employing an electronic billboard; instead of a debt, it tracked the supposed additional cost of using a rival chip. In 2010, a "death clock" modelled after the debt clock was erected in Times Square, counting how many maternal deaths happen worldwide every 90 seconds.

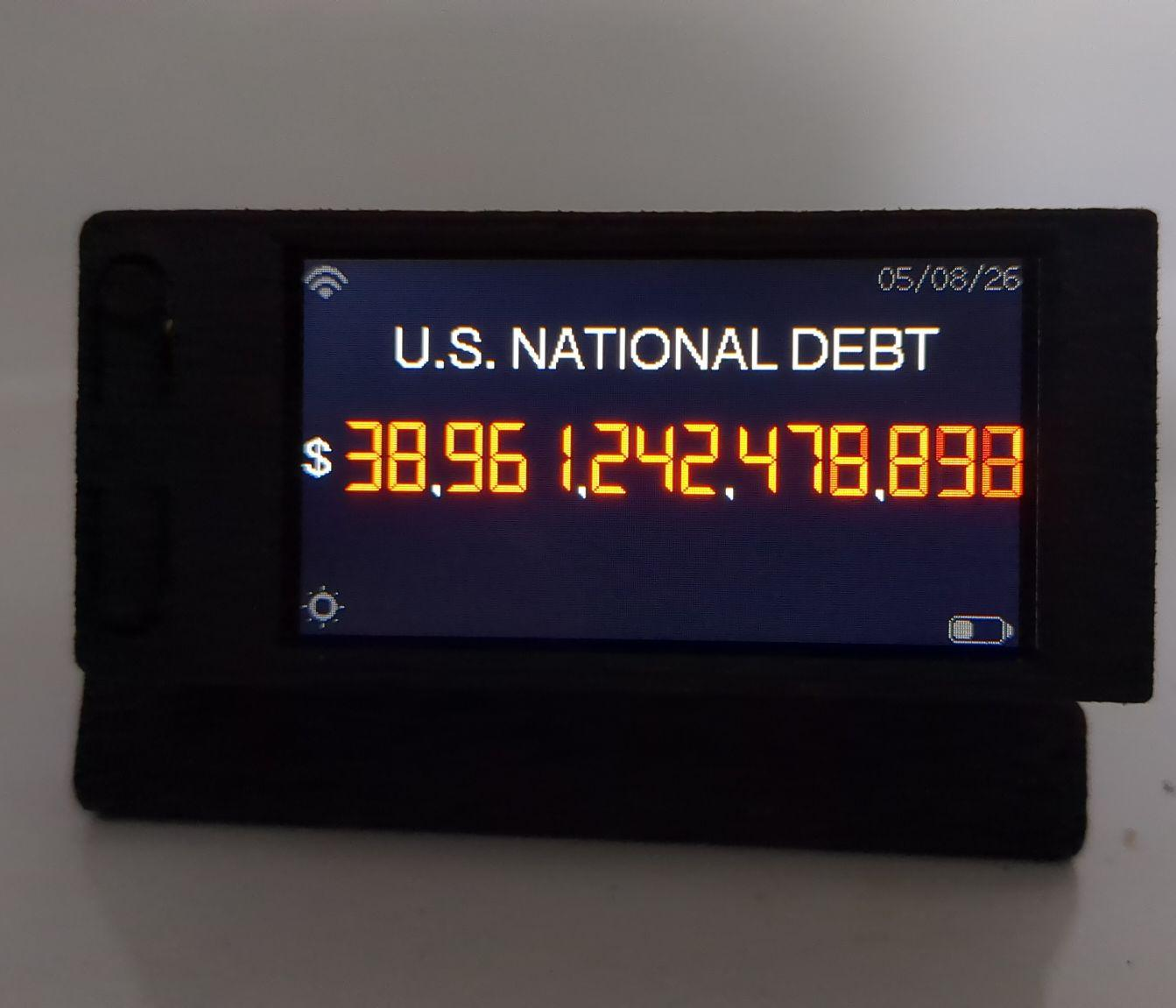
In 2023, Thomas Massie created the Debt Badge to "put the debt in the face of (his) colleagues every day."

Two displays related to the national debt were shown during the 2012 Republican National Convention. One of the displays showed a ticking number similar to the original clock. The second display showed a number estimating the amount the national debt had increased since the start of the convention. According to the Republican Party, the purpose of the RNC's clock was to underscore the fact that national debt had grown at a fast pace under the presidency of Barack Obama, who was then running for reelection. RNC chair Reince Priebus said that the clock represented the "unprecedented fiscal recklessness of the Obama administration."

In 2023, U.S. Congressman Thomas Massie (R-KY) invented the Debt Badge, a wearable device which provides a digital real-time display of the U.S. national debt. He created the badge to "induce a little anxiety among my colleagues" and to create "some concern for the debt."

== In popular culture ==
The clock is featured in the 2006 documentary Maxed Out, which is about national debt. Several members of the Durst family appear in the film.

The clock is mentioned on the April 4, 2021, episode of Last Week Tonight with John Oliver, "The National Debt". The episode talks about the national debt and how the clock was started by "the Durst family. Yes, THAT Durst family."

== See also ==
- Climate Clock
- Government debt
- United States public debt
- History of the U.S. public debt
- National wealth
