= Benjamin Winter =

New York City real estate developer

Benjamin Winter Sr.
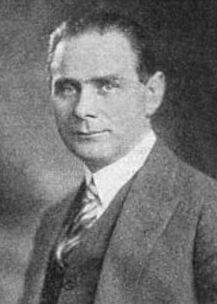
- Born: February 5, 1881; Łódź, Poland
- Died: June 16, 1944 (aged 63); New York City, United States
- Occupation: real estate developer
- Known for: founder of Winter Incorporated
- Spouse: Dora Winter
- Children: 5

Benjamin Winter Sr. (February 5, 1881 – June 16, 1944) was a real estate developer in New York City and founder of Winter Incorporated. Winter served as president of the American Federation of Polish Jews.

== Biography ==
Born in Łódź, Poland, to a Jewish family, Winter emigrated in 1901 to New York City, one year after his father. His father him took on a tour of Manhattan, showing him the lavish Vanderbilt and Astor houses which Winter was to eventually own. After saving for 12 years, in 1912, Winter used the proceeds as a painter of tenements to buy tenements in lower Manhattan. The following year, he and Scotch-Irishman Andrew O'Brien bought their first apartment building, in Washington Heights. The venture was successful and Winter soon after started his own company funded by his share of the profits and investors in the Polish Jewish community, he invested in mid-Manhattan where he targeted the great mansions of Fifth Avenue for redevelopment. In 1925, he purchased the Mrs. William B. Astor House and later demolished it; in 1929, it was replaced with the new Congregation Emanu-El of New York In 1926, Winter had previously purchased and sold the old Temple Emanu-El building at 5th Avenue and 43rd Street which was demolished and replaced in 1927 with a commercial building by its subsequent owner Joseph Durst. Also in 1925, he purchased the William K. Vanderbilt House and demolished it replacing it with a residential high rise. By tearing down the mansions, Winter along with fellow real estate speculator Frederick Brown, were credited with transforming that section of Fifth Avenue into "the aristocrat of shopping thoroughfares." In 1927, he formed Winter Incorporated and offered preferred shares on the New York Stock Exchange which enabled him to raise funds for larger projects. He went bankrupt in 1937 during the Great Depression losing his entire $40 million (equivalent to $0.6 billion in 2024) in wealth, although he recovered most of his wealth by his death in 1944.

He was known for having the ability to identify under-valued properties in up-and-coming neighborhoods, making a purchase, and then selling them later for a tidy profit. Within 20 years, he became the most prolific realtor in New York City with over $500 million sales. His portfolio of prominent properties came to include the Hotel Delmonico, the Stanhope Hotel, the Hotel Lenori, the Spanish Flats (which he later demolished), Bretton Hall, the Gunther Building, the Hotel Claridge, Hotel Hermitage, and many residential properties along Park and Fifth Avenues.

== Personal life ==
He was married to Dora Winter; they had five children. In the 1950s, his son Marvin turned the company from an opportunistic buyer and seller of real estate to a long-term holder. After Marvin's death, his sons Benjamin Winter and James Winter took over the family business. Later, Benjamin's son, David S. Winter, joined the business.
