= Hotel Claridge =

Former hotel in Manhattan, New York

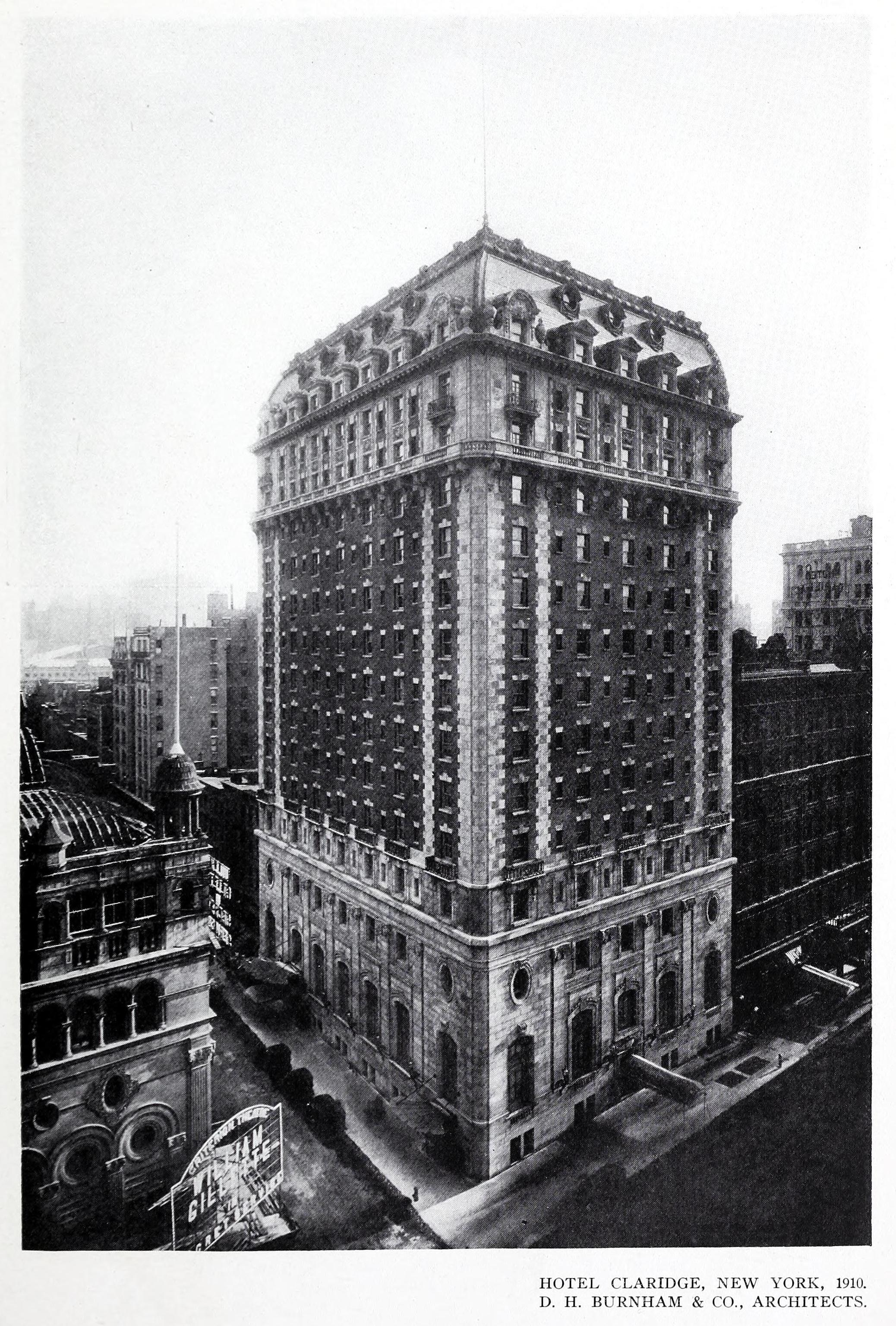

General information
- Architectural style: Beaux-arts style
- Location: 1500 Broadway (160 West 44th Street), Manhattan, New York City
- Coordinates: 40°45′25″N 73°59′08″W
- Construction started: 1910
- Opening: 1911
- Closed: 1970

Technical details
- Floor count: 16

Design and construction
- Architect: D.H. Burnham & Company

Other information
- Number of rooms: 240

The Hotel Claridge was a 16-story building on Times Square in Manhattan, New York City, at the southeast corner of Broadway and 44th Street. Originally known as the Hotel Rector, it was built of brick in the Beaux-arts style in 1910–1911. The 14-story building had 240 guest rooms and 216,000 square feet of space. It operated for 59 years until the building was demolished in 1970 and replaced with 1500 Broadway.

== History ==
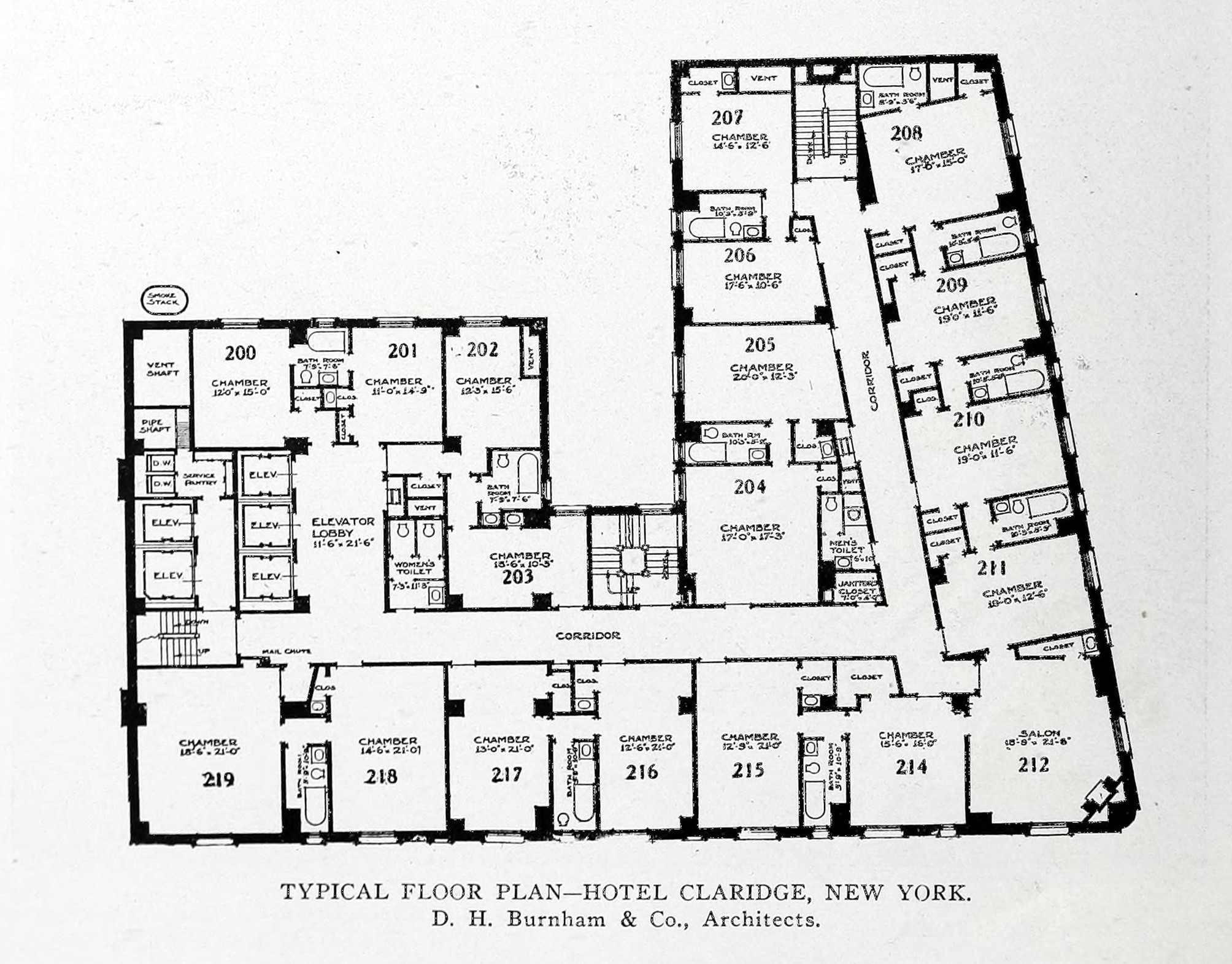
Typical floor plan of the hotel

The Hotel Rector was established by George Rector as a complement to his popular restaurant, which had been founded by his father and was frequented by New York's rich and famous, including Diamond Jim Brady and Cornelius Vanderbilt III. The timing of his new venture was unfortunate, because as the hotel was being developed, a popular Broadway play was released, called The Girl from Rector's. The play was considered indecent by many critics and gave the Rector's name an unsavory reputation. Rector held the play responsible when he declared his new hotel bankrupt in May 1913. The new owners wanted a new name to escape the stigma, so the Hotel Rector became the Hotel Claridge in 1913. The new name evoked the exclusive Claridge's of London. Although they were no longer using the old name, the new management refused to allow use of the Rector's brand for another restaurant. Rector successfully sued to regain use of his own name.

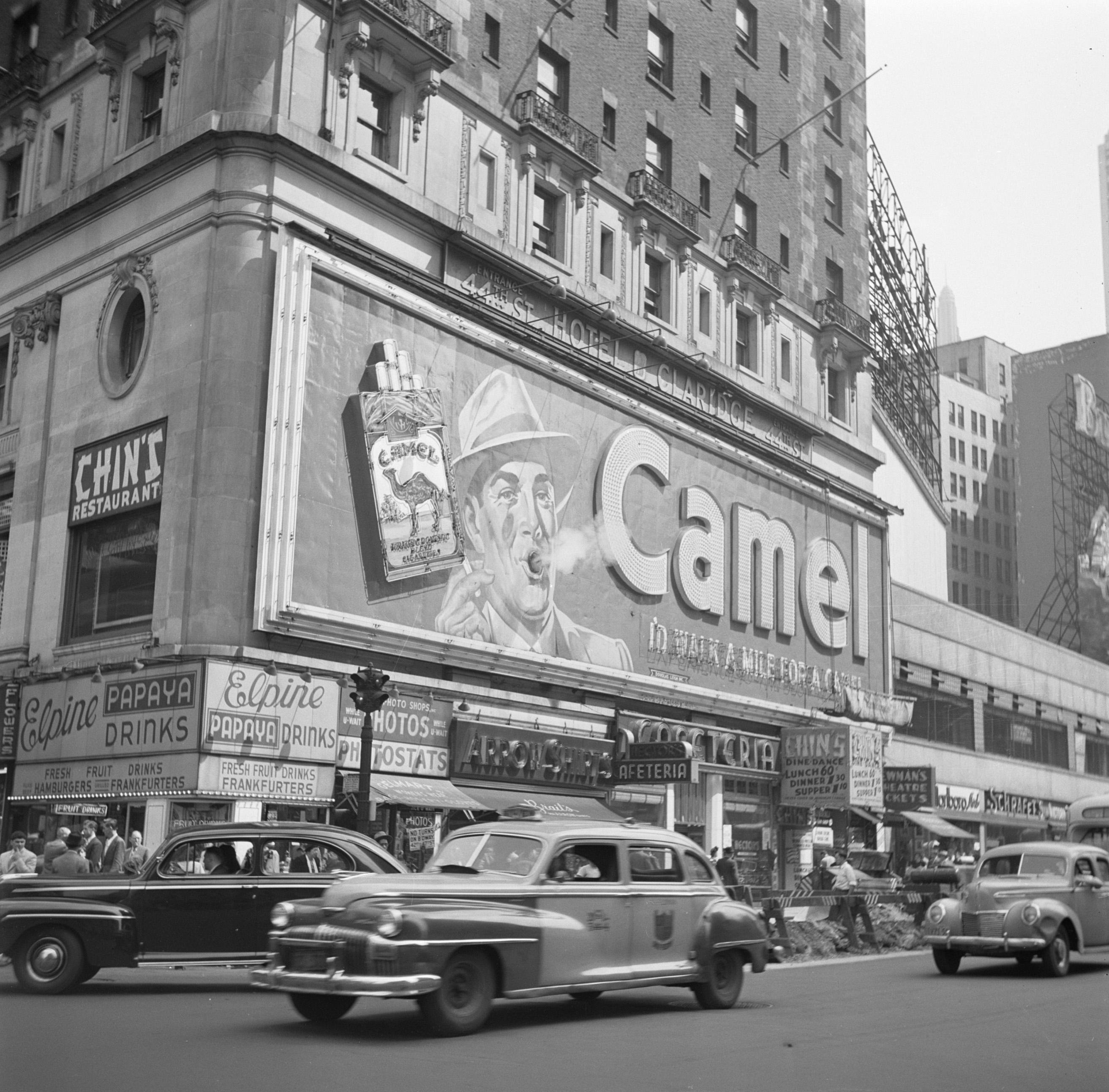
The celebrated smoking Camel cigarette billboard in Times Square was designed by Douglas Leigh and mounted on the Hotel Claridge. (Photo, 1948)

The American Society of Composers, Authors and Publishers (ASCAP) was founded at the Hotel Claridge on February 13, 1914.

The Claridge Hotel with US flags and "Claridge welcomes you home" banner on it, Motor Transport Corps recruiting station visible in foreground

In 1923, the hotel was purchased by real estate investor Benjamin Winter, Sr. for $3 million. In May 1964 it was bought by Douglas Leigh Inc. for an unspecified sum. Leigh indicated he would turn the hotel into a commercial building, with stores, a restaurant and exhibit space on the lower floors and showrooms, offices and meeting rooms on the upper floors.

One of the most enduring images of Times Square is the "Camel Man", who blew cigarette smoke rings 24 hours a day from 1941 to 1966 from a large billboard advertising Camel cigarettes and mounted on the Broadway side of the hotel.

=== Demolition and rebuilding ===
The building was razed in 1970 to make way for a 33-story office tower at 1500 Broadway. National General Corporation based their eastern operations in the building and also incorporated a movie theater into the building, the first new movie theater in Times Square for more than 30 years, which opened December 12, 1972, with the premiere of The Poseidon Adventure. The theater added a screen in 1982 and closed in 1998.

The first and second floors are occupied by ABC's Times Square Studios, home to the Good Morning America television program.

== In popular culture ==
In the film The Hustler (1961), starring Jackie Gleason and Paul Newman, the pool scenes were shot in Ames Billiards on the building's second floor. The space had previously been home to Chin's Restaurant (1928-1949) and was originally built as a private dining hall/ballroom for Rector's Hotel Restaurant.

In the film Midnight Cowboy (1969), Joe Buck (Jon Voight) lodges in the Hotel Claridge at the beginning of his stay in New York City (but he is soon expelled due to failure to pay).
