= Chashama =

Non-profit organization based in New York City

ChaShaMa is a non-profit arts organization based in New York City. ChaShaMa nurtures artists by transforming unused property into affordable work and presentation space.

== Description ==
Since being founded in 1995 by Anita Durst, daughter of New York real estate developer Douglas Durst, ChaShaMa has transformed 70 locations throughout the city and launched the careers of over 12,000 artists by giving them access to subsidized space, which supported approximately 10,000 public presentations for over 500,000 viewers. ChaShaMa provides free and subsidized space for artists to live, work, and present partnering with developers and property owners to transform their vacant buildings into centers of creativity with the added benefit of increasing local foot traffic and supporting area businesses.

ChaShaMa runs a variety of programs to serve the emerging artist community in the city. They include:

- Using temporarily vacant storefront windows for free, public installations and performances
- Providing subsidized or free rehearsal and performance space
- Providing subsidized artist's studios
- Presenting a variety of visual artist exhibitions throughout the year

The meaning of "chashama" depends on whom one asks. chashama (pronounced: sha-SHA-ma) is Persian for "to have vision". Although some say it is an Arabic word that means "shame," others say it means "from the eye" (Persian: Chashm'a) or "spring outlet" (Persian: Chesh'ma). There are many more theories of spelling, pronunciation, and meaning. Some critics argue that the word is a complete fabrication, both in spelling and etymology.
