= The Durst Organization =

Real estate company in New York City

- Company type: Private
- Founded: 1915; 111 years ago
- Founders: Joseph Durst
- Headquarters: One Bryant Park, New York City, New York, United States
- Key people: Douglas Durst (chairman); Jonathan "Jody" Durst (president); Alexander Durst (Principal & Chief Development Officer); Kristoffer Durst (Principal & Chief Information Officer); Helena Rose Durst (Principal); David Neil (Principal)
- Website: www.durst.org

The Durst Organization is one of the oldest family-run commercial and residential real estate companies in New York City. Established in 1915, the company is owned and operated by the third and fourth generations of the Durst family. It is the owner, manager, and builder of 13 million square feet of Manhattan office towers, with a residential portfolio of 3,400 units across three million square feet. It is a member of the Real Estate Board of New York (REBNY). In 2020, Forbes magazine estimated the Durst family fortune at $8.1 billion.

== History ==
In 1902, Jewish immigrant Joseph Durst arrived in the United States from Gorlice, Galicia, Poland with three dollars to his name. He found work as a tailor in New York City, and in 1912, he became a full partner in a dress manufacturer, Durst & Rubin.

Using the profits from his business, Durst bought his first building in 1915: The Century Building at One West 34th Street. In 1926, he acquired the original Temple Emanu-El at 5th Avenue and 43rd Street, from Benjamin Winter Sr. the largest synagogue building in the United States at the time; it was demolished in 1927 to make room for commercial development.

In 1927, he formed The Durst Organization. Seymour was the first of his three sons to join the firm, with younger brothers Royal and David joining later. Together, the three brothers expanded the company's holdings in Midtown Manhattan. Seymour's sons, Robert and Douglas, later joined the firm as well.

Early property acquisitions included the company's first residential building, a 15-story building at Fifth Avenue and 85th Street, in 1929; Park Hill Theater and store in Yonkers, New York, in 1936; and 205 East 42nd Street, in 1944, anchored in the 21st century by City University of New York.

In 1974, Joseph Durst died, and his son, Seymour, took control of the company, amid the 1973–1975 recession. In 1992, Seymour retired and his son, Douglas, took over operation of the company. Seymour died in 1995.

Douglas continued to lead The Durst Organization into the 21st century, becoming chairman, with cousin Jody Durst as president, and his children, Helena and Alexander, as directors of the firm.

== Expansion into construction and projects ==
In the 1950s, the Durst Organization shifted from primarily real estate management to new construction and development. The company acquired land lots and completed the following buildings, many of which it still owns, while uses and tenancies have changed over time. Among its highest-profile property holdings is One World Trade Center.

The Lorillard Building, a 29-story office building at 200 East 42nd Street (now 5 Grand Central East, formerly 655 Third Avenue) was the company's first construction project, and was overseen by David M. Durst, the youngest of the five children born to Joseph and Rose Durst. The lot was purchased in 1958, and the structure, designed by architect Emery Roth, was completed in 1959 for Old Gold and Kent cigarette manufacturing by the Lorillard Tobacco Company.

The property portfolio grew to include commercial and residential properties, often designed by Emery Ross & Sons, including 11 Grand Central East (formerly 733 Third Avenue), a 24-story office building built in 1961. 201 East 42nd Street (now 675 Third Avenue) was erected in 1966. The 32-story office building was sold, in 2025, to David Werner Real Estate.

Henry Miller's Theatre at 124 West 43rd Street occupied the full city block facing Broadway, between 44th and 45th Streets, when the company bought it in 1968; it was later demolished to build the Bank of America Tower in its place. The original neo-Georgian facade was preserved and fronts the Stephen Sondheim Theatre, at the base of the bank tower. 825 Third Avenue, a 40-story office tower, was also among the Durst buildings designed by Roth was built in 1969 and renovated in 2019. The company completed the 45-story 1133 Avenue of the Americas, in 1970, at 1133 Sixth Avenue, then, in 1984, the 41-story 1155 Avenue of the Americas at 1155 Sixth Avenue, into which Durst built coffee bars during the early 1990s. The two skyscrapers are ranked as the 4715th and 6370th tallest buildings in the world, respectively.

The 26-story U.S. Trust Building at 114 West 47th Street was designed by architects Fox and Fowle and completed in 1989; and the 48-story One Five One (formerly 4 Times Square) was completed a decade later.

In 2005, the 38-story Helena at 601 West 57th Street opened, named in honor of Douglas Durst's daughter. Two years later, the 57-story Epic on 125 West 31st Street was completed, and later sold to Fetner Properties during the dissolution of Durst Fetner Residential, followed by the 55-story Bank of America Tower at One Bryant Park in 2008.

VIA 57 West at 625 West 57th Street was completed in 2016. The pyramid shaped residential tower block or "tetrahedron" was designed by the Danish architecture firm Bjarke Ingels Group (BIG). The 10-story Frank 57 West, located at 600 West 58th Street, was also completed in 2016 at the 57 West campus. EŌS, a 47-story residential tower located at 100 West 31st Street, opened in 2016.

Sven, a 71-story building at 29-59 Northern Boulevard (formerly 29-27 41st Avenue), next to Queens Plaza was completed in 2021, and is ranked as the 1270th-tallest building in the world. In 2019, the 22-story 10 Halletts Point opened, the first building in the Halletts Point residential campus along the Astoria, Queens waterfront. In 2025, the campus expanded with the opening of 20 Halletts Point and 30 Halletts Point.

=== One World Trade Center development ===
In 2010, The Durst Organization bid on and won the right to invest $100 million in the One World Trade Center Development, becoming a co-developer with the Port Authority of New York and New Jersey. Its contract with the Port Authority gave the company a $15 million fee and a percentage of “base building changes that result in net economic benefit to the project.” The specifics of the signed contract give Durst 75 percent of savings up to $24 million and stepping down thereafter (to 50 percent, 25 percent and 15 percent) as the savings increased.

After the company joined the project, three significant design changes were made that altered the base, the spire, and the entry. The 185-foot base of the tower, the corners of which were originally designed to slope gently upward, was squared off. Rather than being clad in panels of prismatic glass, it would be covered in "hundreds of pairs of 13-foot vertical glass fins set against horizontal bands of eight-inch-wide stainless-steel slats."

The spire, originally intended to be enclosed with a decorative shell (known as a radome) and described as a "sculptural sheath of interlocking fiberglass panels" would, instead, be unclad, officially reducing the tower's height by the Council on Tall Buildings and Urban Habitat, from a symbolic 1,776 feet to the height of the roof at 1,368 feet. Douglas Durst, the chairman of The Durst Organization, indicated that the change would save $20 million. The tower's architect, Skidmore, Owings & Merrill, strongly criticized the alteration. Steve Childs, the lead designer, stated, "Eliminating this integral part of the building's design and leaving an exposed antenna and equipment is unfortunate... We stand ready to work with the Port on an alternate design." After joining the project in 2010, The Durst Organization had proposed eliminating the radome to save costs, which was then rejected by the Port Authority's executive director, Chris Ward. Patrick Foye, Ward's September 2011 successor, later approved the alteration. Douglas Durst is reported to have subsequently stated that, "(the antenna) is going to be mounted on the building over the summer. There's no way to do anything at this point."

The plaza to the west of the building facing the Hudson River, which is at an elevation to Vesey Street to the North and West Street to the West, was initially planned as having stainless steel steps reaching down to the streets. Instead it would be a terrace, set apart by a block-long landscaped planter. The Port Authority also removed a skylight set into the plaza when Foye approved the revisions, which he called "few and minor".

== See also ==
- National Debt Clock, created by Seymour Durst.
- Robert Durst (1943–2022), the estranged son of Seymour and brother of current CEO of The Durst Organization, Douglas Durst.
