= Xenon (nightclub) =

Former nightclub in New York City

Coordinates: 40.7559°N 73.9850°W

Xenon was a popular New York City discotheque and nightclub that opened in June 1978 and closed in 1984. It was located in the former Henry Miller's Theatre at 124 West 43rd Street (now the site of the Stephen Sondheim Theatre) which, prior to Xenon, had been renamed Avon-at-the-Hudson and was operating as a porn house.

== Founding ==
Xenon was founded in June 1978 by Howard Stein and Peppo Vanini. Stein had been a promoter who had brought rockers such as The Who, David Bowie, Rod Stewart, and the Rolling Stones to New York City. Vanini ran some of the greatest clubs in Europe including Regines. He and Peppo Vanini had met at Studio 54. (Xenon is chemical element 54.) Madelyn Fudeman was the publicity person.

== Ambiance ==
Xenon was regarded as much more of a "Fashion Crowd", while Studio 54 was more Hollywood. Still, many celebrities such as Andy Warhol, Halston, Michael Jackson, Jack Nicholson, Mick Jagger and Jerry Hall, Tom Cruise, Richard Avedon, Cher, O. J. Simpson, Christopher Reeve, Elton John, Roger Moore, John McEnroe, Tony Curtis, Brooke Shields, Freddie Mercury, David Kennedy, John F. Kennedy Jr. and Robin Williams frequented the club. According to event photographer Bill Bernstein, "Xenon was the only nightclub [in New York City] popular enough to compete with Studio 54 and was popular with the straighter, white, upwardly mobile crowd."

The walls were silver and rays of light came out from a giant "X" above the dance floor. People at Xenon often liked to dance with less clothes than people at Studio 54, sometimes wearing swimsuits while dancing. Xenon was the first night club to provide go-go boxes for amateur go-go dancers to dance on. This got many people interested in go-go dancing. Xenon was featured in a Life magazine article about disco. The full-time Disc-Jockey (DJ) was Tony Smith and the part-time DJs were Louis Martinez (Louis Orlando) and John "Jellybean" Benitez, who later had an affair with Madonna.

== Closure ==
Xenon closed in 1984. The interior of the theater was razed in the 2000s to make way for the Bank of America Tower; its neo-Georgian facade remains intact, having been protected by the New York City Landmarks Preservation Commission in 1987. The 1,055-seat Stephen Sondheim Theater was built behind the facade and below ground to replace the original theater space, making it one of two subterranean houses on Broadway.

== In popular culture ==
- In the film 54 starring Mike Myers the character of Steve Rubell makes comments to his busboys that bad busboys "go to Xenon."
- Xenon was the club used during the dance scene in Nighthawks starring Sylvester Stallone and Billy Dee Williams.
- The party scenes in the 1978 film Eyes of Laura Mars starring Faye Dunaway and Tommy Lee Jones were shot at Xenon.
- Xenon is mentioned in the lyrics for the Roxy Music song "True to Life".
- The video for Gloria Gaynor's "I Will Survive" was shot in Xenon, featuring a roller skater on its dance floor.
