= Douglas Durst =

American real estate investor and developer (born 1944)

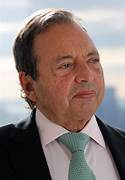
- Born: December 19, 1944 (age 81); New York City, U.S.
- Education: University of California, Berkeley
- Occupation: Real estate developer
- Known for: President of the Durst Organization
- Spouse: Susanne Durst (m. 1967)
- Children: 3
- Parent(s): Seymour Durst; Bernice Herstein
- Relatives: Robert Durst (brother); Joseph Durst (grandfather)

Douglas Durst (born December 19, 1944) is an American real estate investor and developer. He has been the president of The Durst Organization since 1992.

== Early life and education ==
Durst was born in New York City in 1944 to a Jewish family, the son of Bernice (née Herstein) and Seymour Durst. He is the younger brother of convicted murderer Robert Durst.

Durst's paternal grandfather, Joseph Durst, a penniless immigrant tailor from Austria Hungary, eventually became a very successful real estate manager and developer, founding The Durst Organization in 1915. His father, Seymour, became head of the family business in 1974 upon Joseph's death. Douglas's mother died when he was a child, in a fall from the roof of the family's three-story house.

Douglas graduated from the Fieldston School in 1962 and the University of California at Berkeley in 1966. He attended New York University's Urban Studies program for two years and then joined the family business then run by his father and two uncles, Roy and David.

== Career ==
Douglas took over the Durst Organization in 1992 upon his father's retirement. He presided over the development of several major buildings in New York City including 4 Times Square in 1999, Helena at 601 West 57th Street in 2005, Epic on 125 West 31st Street in 2007, and Bank of America Tower at One Bryant Park in 2008. Bank of America Tower was the first high-rise commercial tower to receive LEED platinum rating in the United States. The building was refinanced in 2009. The Durst Organization also developed the New School University Center on 14th Street and 5th Avenue.

Durst has emphasized density and sustainability in some of his projects.

Durst is chairman of The Durst Organization and a member of the third generation of the family to lead the company.

=== One World Trade Center development ===
In 2010, the Durst Organization bid on and won the right to invest $100 million in the One World Trade Center development becoming a co-developer with the Port Authority of New York and New Jersey.

The contract negotiated between the Port Authority and the Durst Organization specifies that the Durst Organization will receive a $15 million fee and a percentage of "base building changes that result in net economic benefit to the project." The specifics of the signed contract give Durst 75 percent of savings up to $24 million and stepping down thereafter (to 50 percent, 25 percent and 15 percent) as the savings increased. Durst had offered to work for a fixed $35 million fee, but the Port chose the incentive fee arrangement.

=== McEnroe Farm ===
In 1987, Durst purchased a farm in Dutchess County, New York. He later partnered with the prior owner to develop it into a large organic farm.

== Personal life ==
In 1967, he married Susanne Durst, a Danish national whom he met in Denmark after college. They have three children. His daughter Anita Durst is the founder of Chashama, a charity dedicated to locating affordable or free studio and gallery space for artists in New York City. Alexander Durst is vice president at the family company. Helena Rose Domino is vice president at the Durst Organization.

He served on the Real Estate Council at the Metropolitan Museum of Art from 2004 to 2019 and currently sits on the Board of Directors at Roundabout Theater Company.

=== 1972 injury and amputation ===
Douglas Durst suffered a severe leg injury in 1972 when a coal-fired water heater exploded in a Newfoundland house where he was then living with his wife and young family. After suffering more than four decades of pain, despite many years of surgery, part of Durst's lower right leg was amputated in 2015. He walks today with the help of a prosthesis.

=== Relationship with Robert Durst ===
Douglas and his brother Robert had a contentious childhood. As children, they were both put in therapy to help resolve their differences. When they became adults, both eventually worked in the family business. As oldest brother, Robert believed he would be the natural successor to his father as the leader of the Durst Organization. When their father Seymour chose Douglas over him in 1992, Robert estranged himself from his entire family and in 2006 sued for his share of the Durst family trust. A $65 million settlement was reached that divested Robert of all future share of the Durst family wealth. In 2001, Robert Durst was charged with murdering a neighbor and dismembering his body in Galveston, Texas. Pleading self-defense, he was acquitted of the murder charge. Douglas was interviewed by The New York Times in January 2015, and was quoted as saying about Robert: "There's no doubt in my mind that if he had the opportunity to kill me, he would."

Douglas Durst told The New York Times in December 2015 that he believed, until 2001, in his brother's innocence regarding Kathleen McCormack Durst's "disappearance" in 1982. Contrary to his brother's assertions to the documentary filmmakers of The Jinx, he was never privy to his father's meetings with a lawyer and private detective tasked with investigating Kathleen's disappearance. "I'm going to be a witness in Los Angeles" for the prosecution of his brother for the murder of Susan Berman, whom investigators believe Durst murdered because she knew details of Robert's role in his wife Kathleen's death, "so they don't want me to talk too much about anything after 2001", Douglas Durst said. On June 28, 2021, Douglas Durst appeared in court as a witness for the prosecution in the Susan Berman murder trial, saying he was not happy to testify against his brother and only appeared under threat of subpoena. He said Robert's wife Kathie told him she was going to seek a divorce from Robert. Robert told him and his wife that Kathie had vanished a couple of days after he put her on a train to New York City from their lakeside house in Westchester County, and that was the last time he saw her. "His tone was very neutral," Douglas Durst said. "There was no great anxiety in his tone. It seemed a little strange.” Douglas said growing up as children his brother Robert "Treated me miserably. He would fight with me at every chance. He would embarrass me." Douglas said Robert would "like to murder me”, and he had not spoken to Robert since 1999. Robert died in prison in January 2022.
