= Joseph Durst =

American real estate developer (1882–1974)

- Born: January 15, 1882; Gorlice, Galicia, Austria-Hungary
- Died: December 31, 1973 (aged 91); New York, New York, U.S.
- Occupation: Real estate developer
- Known for: Founder of the Durst Organization
- Spouse: Rose Friedwald
- Children: 5, including Seymour Durst
- Relatives: Robert Durst (grandson); Douglas Durst (grandson)

Joseph Durst (January 15, 1882 – December 31, 1973) was an American real estate developer, founder of the Durst Organization, and patriarch of the Durst family.

== Early life ==
Born to a Jewish family, Durst immigrated to the US from Gorlice, Galicia, Austria-Hungary in 1902 with three dollars to his name. He worked as a tailor in New York City and in 1912, he became a full partner in the dress manufacturer, Durst & Rubin. Using the profits from his business, he invested in real estate, purchasing his first building in 1915, the Century Building (at 1 West 34th Street). In 1926, he acquired the original Temple Emanu-El (at 5th Avenue and 43rd Street) from Benjamin Winter Sr., demolishing it in 1927 to build a commercial building. In 1927, he formed the Durst Organization.

== Acquisitions and development ==
Thereafter, the Durst Organization continued to make selective acquisitions including:

- In 1929, his first residential building (a 15-story building at Fifth Avenue and 85th Street);
- In 1936, the Park Hill Theater and store in Yonkers, New York;
- In 1944, 205 East 42nd Street.

Later he shifted the focus of the company from primarily real estate management to new construction and development. He assembled the parcels for and completed the following buildings (all of which the Durst Organization continues to own):

- In 1958, a 29-story building at 200 East 42nd Street (655 Third Avenue);
- In 1961, the 24-story 733 Third Avenue;
- In 1966, the 32-story, 201 East 42nd Street (675 Third Avenue).
- In 1968, they purchased Henry Miller's Theatre (the theater was later demolished—although the facade was preserved—to build the Bank of America Tower) and the entire block facing Broadway between 44th and 45th Streets;
- In 1969, the 40-story 825 Third Avenue;
- In 1970, the 45-story 1133 Avenue of the Americas;

== Legacy ==
In 1973, Joseph Durst died and his son Seymour Durst took control of the company during the real estate crash of the 1970s. The Durst family became one of the most established and prominent real estate families in New York City in the 20th century (along with the Roses, the Lefraks, the Rudins, and the Tisch family). As of 2012, the Durst Organization continues to be owned and operated by the third generation of the Durst family owning and managing more than 8.5 million square feet of Class A office space in Midtown Manhattan and over 1 million square feet of luxury residential rentals.

== Personal life ==
Durst was married to Rose Friedwald; they had five children: Seymour, Roy, Alma, Edwin and David. Durst was active in the Jewish community, serving on the executive committee of the Jewish Education Association and as president of the Hebrew Free Loan Society of New York for 27 years. Among his grandsons are screenwriter and director Peter Askin, convicted murderer Robert Durst, and head of the Durst Organization, Douglas Durst.

Durst died on New Year's Eve 1973 in his home, 1136 Fifth Avenue.
