= Seymour Durst =

American real estate investor and developer (1913–1995)

- Born: Seymour Bernard Durst; September 7, 1913; New York City, U.S.
- Died: May 15, 1995 (aged 81); New York City, U.S.
- Education: University of Southern California
- Known for: Father of Robert Durst; National Debt Clock
- Spouse: Bernice Herstein (m. 1940; died 1950)
- Children: 4, including Robert and Douglas
- Parent(s): Joseph Durst; Rose Friedwald

Seymour Bernard Durst (September 7, 1913 – May 15, 1995) was an American real estate investor and developer. He created the National Debt Clock.

== Early life and education ==
Durst was born in the Washington Heights neighborhood of New York City, a son of Joseph Durst, a Jewish immigrant from Gorlice, Galicia, Austria-Hungary (present-day Poland), and Rose Friedwald.

His father was a tailor who arrived penniless to the United States, eventually becoming a successful dress manufacturer and then expanding into real estate management and development. His father was also active in the Jewish community, serving on the executive committee of the Jewish Education Association and serving as president of the Hebrew Free Loan Society for 27 years. He had four siblings: Roy, Alma, Edwin and David. In 1931, Durst graduated from the Horace Mann School in Riverdale, the Bronx. In 1935, he graduated from the University of Southern California, where he majored in accounting.

== Career ==
In 1940, Durst joined The Durst Organization, the real estate firm founded by his father. After his father's death in 1974, Seymour became more involved in the company. The company invested in Manhattan real estate, based upon Durst's belief that one should never buy anything one cannot walk to.

While on holiday in Paris, France, in the early 1960s, Durst noticed a book on the history of New York City by a German author in a mom-and-pop bookstore. He later said, "I figured if a German wrote a book about NYC that was available in Paris, that this was an interesting subject indeed." He began to collect books, establishing a collection that came to be known as the Old York Library. Housed in a brownstone on East 48th street in midtown Manhattan in the 1970s, the library later moved to another brownstone at 120 East 61st Street. After Durst's death in May 1995, the library was moved to the City University of New York in the B. Altman Building across from the Empire State Building. It was later moved to Columbia University's Avery Architectural And Fine Arts Library where it is open to the public.

Seymour Durst was vocal about his beliefs that the government should not interfere in real estate transactions. However, his son and successor, Douglas Durst, received interest-free, government-issued Liberty Bonds under Governor George Pataki, and also used eminent domain to facilitate the family's growing real estate interests. The former subsidized the cost of building massive projects in both midtown and downtown Manhattan, and the latter enabled the Durst family to take holdout properties on West 42nd Street, where 4 Times Square and 1 Bryant Park were built.

Durst was also concerned with the national debt. In 1989, Durst created and installed the National Debt Clock on a Durst Organization property in order to draw attention to the then-$2.7 trillion debt.

The collection comprised more than 35,000 items, including historic photographs, maps, pamphlets, newspapers, books and New York City memorabilia.

== Personal life ==
In 1940, he married Bernice Herstein. They had four children:

- Robert Durst (1943–2022) – accused of three murders (acquitted in one on the grounds that the killing was self-defense but convicted of tampering with evidence by dismembering the corpse), which are fictionalized in the 2010 movie All Good Things, and the subject of a 2015 HBO series (The Jinx: The Life and Deaths of Robert Durst), as well as an episode of Law & Order and two episodes of Law and order SVU. Robert Durst was arrested in 2015 for the alleged murder of Susan Berman and was convicted on September 17, 2021.
- Douglas Durst (born 1944) – present chairman of The Durst Organization
- Wendy Durst Kreeger – philanthropist and writer
- Thomas Durst – philanthropist and writer

Bernice Herstein Durst (1918–1950) died in 1950 at the age of 32 as a result of falling or jumping off the roof of their family home in Scarsdale. It was never determined if the death was an accident or a suicide. Their son Robert has said that he witnessed the event; his brother, Douglas, has said that none of the children witnessed the accident. Durst never remarried.

== Legacy ==
After Durst's death, his son Douglas and nephew Jonathan (the son of his brother David) became more involved in the family business, The Durst Organization.
