= Rudin (surname) =

Rudin is a surname. As a Russian surname (Рудин), it has the feminine form, Rudina and is associated with the old noble Russian Rudin family. Notable people with the surname include:

- A. James Rudin (born c.1934), American rabbi
- Alexander Rudin (born 1960), Russian classical cellist and conductor
- Anne Rudin (1924–2021), American politician
- Cynthia Rudin (born 1976), American computer scientist and statistician
- Dan Rudin, American record producer and audio and mix engineer
- Ernst Rüdin (1874–1952), Swiss-German geneticist
- Ernst Rudin (canoeist), Swiss canoeist
- Felix Rudin (born 1965), Swiss footballer
- Guido Rudin (born 1963), Swiss footballer
- Jack Rudin (1924–2016), American real estate developer
- John James Rudin (1916–1995), American Catholic bishop
- Karl Rudin, Swiss footballer
- Ken Rudin, American radio journalist
- Leonid Rudin, American computer scientist
- Lewis Rudin (1927–2001), American real estate investor and developer, brother of Jack Rudin
- Margaret Rudin (born 1943), American with a vacated murder conviction
- Margarita Rudina (born 1979), Russian ballet dancer
- Mary Ellen Rudin (1924–2013), American mathematician
- Natalia Anatolievna Rudina or Natali (singer) (born 1974), Russian singer
- Rosie Rudin (born 1998), British swimmer
- Samuel Rudin (1896–1975), American real estate businessman, father of Jack and Lewis Rudin
- Scott Rudin (born 1958), American film, television, and theater producer
- Tatyana Rudina (born 1959), Soviet and Russian film an stage actress
- Tomas Rudin (born 1965), Swedish politician
- Walter Rudin (1921–2010), American mathematician

== Fictional characters ==
- Dmitrii Nikolaevich Rudin from the novel Rudin by Ivan Turgenev

== See also ==
- Ruding
- Rodin (surname)
- Rubin (surname)
