= DeWoody =

DeWoody is a surname. Notable people with the surname include:

- Beth Rudin DeWoody (born 1952), American art patron
- James DeWoody (born 1945), American painter
- Joseph DeWoody, American businessman
- Kyle DeWoody, American curator
