= Breit (disambiguation) =

Breit is a municipality in Rhineland-Palatinate, Germany

Breit may also refer to:

== Persons with the surname Breit ==
- Franz Breit (1817–1868), Obstetrician
- Gary Breit, Canadian musician
- Kevin Breit, Canadian musician
- Gregory Breit (1899–1981), American physicist
- Henryk Breit (1906–1941), Polish philologist and journalist
- Harvey Breit (1909–1968), American poet, editor and playwright
- William L. Breit (1933–2011), American economist

== Topics in physics ==
- Breit equation
- Relativistic Breit–Wigner distribution
- Breit-Rabi Oscillation (or Breit-Rabi cycle)
- Breit-Rabi formula

== Music ==
- "Breit", A song by German band Die Ärzte from Jazz ist anders

== Business ==
- BREIT, a large real estate investment trust managed by Blackstone Inc.
