= 2025 Midtown Manhattan shooting =

Mass shooting in New York City, US

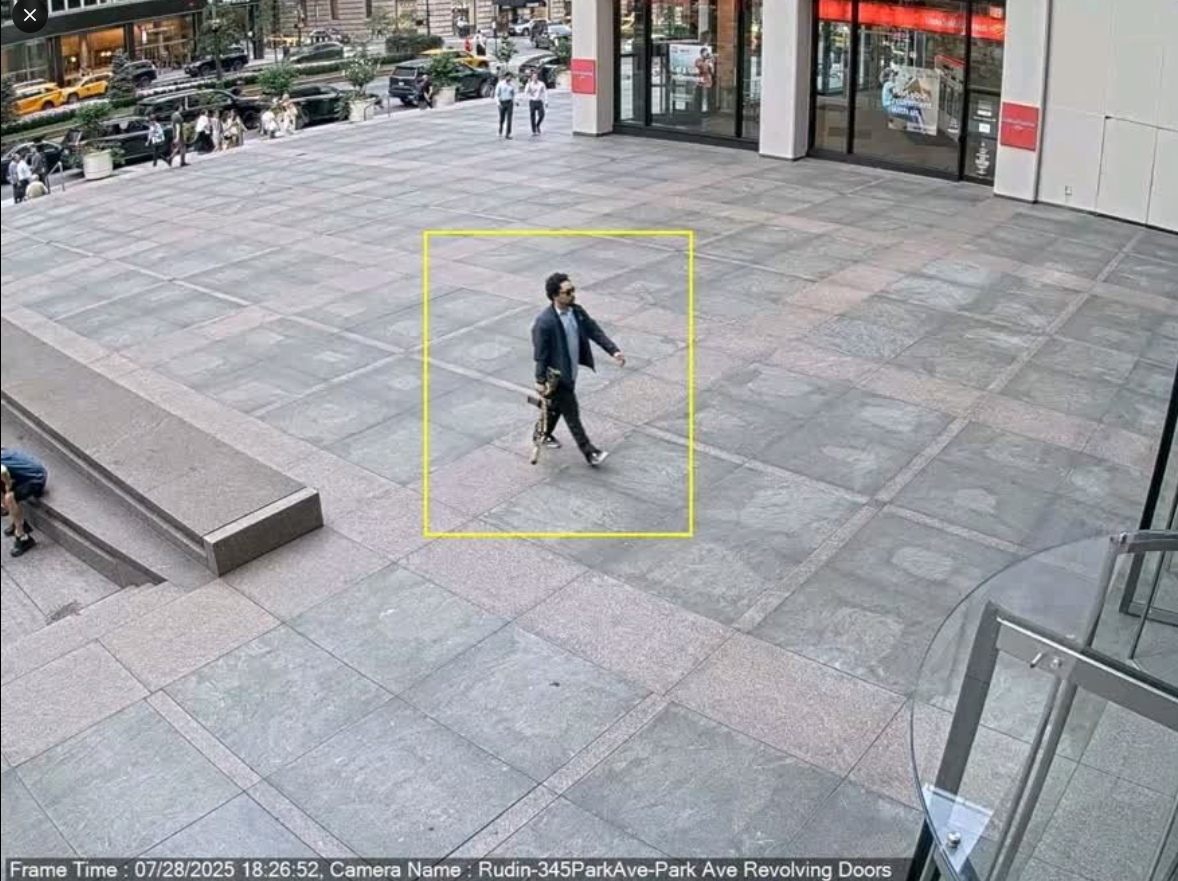
- CCTV still of Tamura approaching the entrance of 345 Park Avenue while carrying the rifle he used during the shooting
- Location: 40.7578°N 73.9725°W; 345 Park Avenue, Midtown Manhattan, New York City, New York, U.S.
- Date: July 28, 2025; 15 months ago 6:28 p.m. (EDT; UTC−4)
- Target: National Football League headquarters
- Attack type: Mass shooting; murder-suicide; mass murder
- Weapon: Palmetto State Armory PA-15 semi-automatic rifle
- Deaths: 5 (including the perpetrator)
- Injuries: 5 (1 by gunshot)
- Perpetrator: Shane Devon Tamura
- Motive: Under investigation, possibly grievances with the NFL related to CTE

On July 28, 2025, a mass shooting occurred at 345 Park Avenue in Midtown Manhattan, New York City, United States. The incident began at 6:28 p.m. EDT (UTC–4). A gunman identified as 27-year-old Shane Devon Tamura, wearing body armor, fired an AR-15–style rifle inside the building killing four people, including a New York City police officer who was off-duty and working as security. Tamura committed suicide after barricading himself on the 33rd floor of the building. The mass shooting is the deadliest in New York City since the 2000 Wendy's massacre in Queens. The perpetrator's motive is being investigated by police.

== Shooting ==
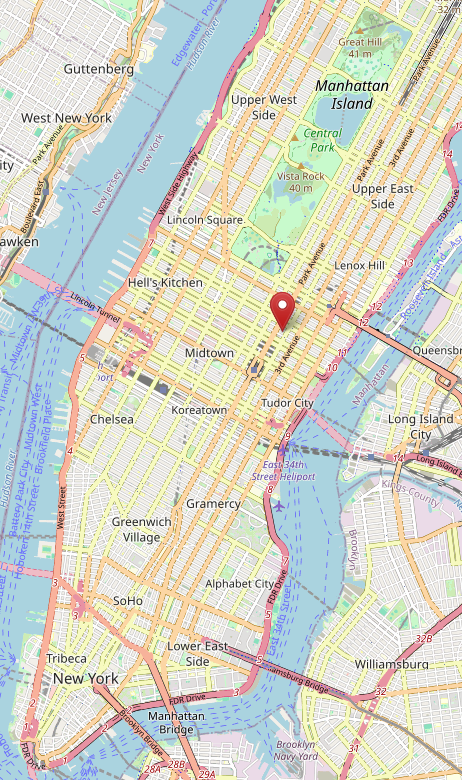
Location of the 345 Park Avenue skyscraper within Manhattan

Tamura left his home in Las Vegas on July 26 driving to Manhattan, New York, and was spotted in Colorado on July 26 and between Nebraska and Iowa on July 27. He stopped in Columbia, New Jersey, on July 28 shortly before arriving in New York City.

After parking his car nearby, Tamura walked inside 345 Park Avenue, where he fatally shot police officer Didarul Islam and a woman who had taken cover behind a pillar. He then sprayed the lobby with gunfire, hitting a man before shooting a security guard at the elevators. According to Police Commissioner Jessica Tisch, he allowed a woman inside the elevator to walk away unharmed before exiting on the 33rd floor where Rudin Management's offices are located. Tamura shot Julia Hyman and then barricaded himself on the 33rd floor, where he fatally shot himself in the chest. The emergency response to the mass shooting included police, firefighters, and the Federal Bureau of Investigation.

Investigators believe that Tamura intended to target the National Football League (NFL), which has offices on multiple floors in the building, but went to the wrong bank of elevators, taking one to the 33rd floor. Officials said the suspect acted alone.

== Victims ==
Tamura killed four people and critically injured another person. Didarul Islam, a 36-year-old off-duty police officer working as a security guard in NYPD uniform, was shot in the back and died while undergoing surgery. He was saluted by citizens and police in the street as he was transferred to an ambulance. 43-year-old Wesley LePatner, the CEO of BREIT who oversaw Blackstone's $53 billion real estate investment fund, Julia Hyman, a 27-year-old working for Rudin Management, and Aland Etienne, a 46-year-old security guard, were the other people killed.

An NFL employee who worked in the finance department was seriously injured when he was struck in the back by a bullet. Four people suffered minor injuries while fleeing the scene.

== Perpetrator ==
The perpetrator was identified as 27-year-old Shane Devon Tamura. Tamura was a surveillance department employee (he worked in security) at Horseshoe Las Vegas, a casino in Paradise, Nevada, according to a statement released by Caesars Entertainment. According to CNN, he had a concealed carry license for a handgun and an expired private investigator license. At the time of the shooting, he had a loaded revolver, magazines, ammunition, a backpack, and prescribed medication in his vehicle. He did not have a significant criminal background. According to officials in Las Vegas, Tamura had a documented mental health history with two psychiatric holds in Nevada, one in 2022 and another in 2024.

Tamura was arrested in 2023 for suspicion of trespassing at the Red Rock Resort in Summerlin, Nevada. Law enforcement said that he was "agitated" and would not leave the premises. He had a suicide note in his back pocket saying that he suffered from chronic traumatic encephalopathy (CTE), a neurodegenerative disease which can result from involvement in contact sports. The note said, "Terry Long, football gave me CTE and it caused me to drink a gallon of antifreeze," "Study my brain please I'm sorry, tell Rick I'm sorry for everything" and "You can't go against the NFL, they'll squash you." Long played in the NFL and was diagnosed with CTE. He died by suicide in 2005 after drinking antifreeze. The identity of "Rick" is believed to be Tamura's supervisor at Horseshoe Las Vegas, a casino where Tamura was last employed. Rick sold Tamura the BMW he drove to New York, as well as the lower receiver of the AR-15 he used in the shooting for $1,400. A second, publicly undisclosed note also mentions CTE. In September 2025, the New York City medical examiner confirmed Tamura had CTE.

Tamura obtained a concealed carry license in 2022. Reports indicated that Tamura had a concealed carry permit and no known criminal history with an exception of minor charges, including a trespassing charge in 2023 which was dropped a month later according to Clark County court records. His neighbors said they did not recognize Tamura but they recognized his car, which they said was driven in and out of their gated community of Desert Shores. He had a work card issued by the Nevada Private Investigators Licensing Board from 2019 to 2024, but the work card did not authorize him to carry a firearm.

== Aftermath ==
A multi‑faith prayer vigil was held at Bryant Park in Manhattan the evening after the shooting. Mayor Eric Adams, Governor Kathy Hochul, Attorney General Letitia (Tish) James, Police Commissioner Jessica Tisch and religious leaders attended alongside hundreds of mourners. Flowers and candles were placed near the building and flags were flown citywide at half-mast in honor of the victims.

Fundraisers for officer Didarul Islam and his family raised over $200,000. Islam was posthumously promoted to Detective First Grade at his funeral by Police Commissioner Tisch.

=== Reactions ===
In a press conference, Mayor Eric Adams said the shooting was a "violent, despicable" act. He called Didarul Islam a hero who put his life on the line.

President Donald Trump posted on Truth Social that he had been briefed on the situation. He said the shooting was a "senseless act of violence" and extended condolences to the victims' families. In a statement, Governor Hochul advocated for increased gun control "The time to act is now. The American people... deserve action. Congress must summon the courage to stand up to the gun lobby and finally pass a national assault weapons ban before more innocent lives are stolen."

=== Lawsuit ===
The family of Julia Hyman has hired attorney Alex Spiro to investigate for a potential lawsuit.

== Investigation ==
After the shooting, NYPD officers searched Tamura's vehicle and found a loaded Colt Python .357 Magnum revolver, ammunition, the antidepressant Zoloft, marijuana, headphones likely used for target practice and two cellphones. In June 2025, a caller from a Las Vegas gun show reported that Tamura had purchased large amounts of ammunition and an aftermarket trigger.

== See also ==
- 2017 New York City truck attack – Attack in Manhattan, New York, US
- 2021 Rock Hill shooting – Mass shooting in South Carolina, U.S.
- 101 California Street shooting – 1993 mass shooting in San Francisco, California
- Or Tor Kor Market shooting – Mass shooting in Bangkok, Thailand
- Chris Benoit double-murder and suicide – 2007 familicide in Fayetteville, Georgia, U.S.
- List of mass shootings in the United States in 2025
