= Wendy's shooting =

Wendy's shooting may refer to:

- Wendy's massacre (2000)
- Killing of Rayshard Brooks (2020)
