= Jack Rudin =

American real estate developer (1924–2016)

- Born: Jacob Rudin; June 28, 1924; New York City, US
- Died: December 4, 2016 (aged 92); New York City, US
- Education: City College of New York
- Occupation: Chairman of Rudin Management Company Inc.
- Spouse(s): Roberta Chait (died 1983); Susan Salesky Schaenen
- Children: 3
- Parent(s): May Cohen; Samuel Rudin
- Family: Lewis Rudin (brother)

Jack Rudin (June 28, 1924 – December 4, 2016) was a New York City real estate developer and a son of real estate developer Samuel Rudin. Together with his younger brother, Lewis, he led the family company, Rudin Management.

== Background ==
Rudin was born to a Jewish family in New York City in 1924, the son of May (née Cohen) and Samuel Rudin. His birth name was Jacob Rudin; he later legally changed his name to Jack. He attended P.S. 166, then DeWitt Clinton High School and City College of New York. In 1942, he served in the United States Army as a Staff Sergeant and received the Bronze Star Medal for fighting in the Battle of the Bulge. In 1945, he returned to the United States and entered the family business. In the 1950s and 1960s, the Rudin family was one of the most prolific builders of skyscrapers in Manhattan.

=== Rudin Management ===
In 1975, Jack and his brother Lewis, took over the family company. Jack focused on construction and operations while Lewis focused on financing and marketing. In 1990, the Rudin Management portfolio was valued at $1.5 billion. He was chairman of the Rudin Management Company.

Building developments include 3 Times Square, 345 Park Avenue, 350 Park Avenue, 55 Broad Street, 32 Avenue of the Americas, and New York Merchandise Mart.

== Philanthropy ==
Rudin was on the boards of Memorial Sloan-Kettering Cancer Center and Jazz at Lincoln Center. He was an honorary trustee of the American Museum of Natural History and Congregation Shearith Israel, and previously was a trustee at Iona College. In 2003, he was awarded the Chevalier of the French Legion of Honor; and in 2008 the Benemerenti Award Medal by Pope Benedict XVI. Rudin was the primary sponsor of the Va'ad Gemilut Hasadim: Susan and Jack Rudin Center for Community Outreach.

== Personal life ==
In 1951, he married Roberta Chait; she died in 1983. They had three children: Eric, Madeleine, and Katherine Rudin. He later married Susan Salesky Schaenen with whom he had two stepdaughters, Inda and Eve Schaenen. Rudin died on December 4, 2016, in New York City. Rudin was a member of the Congregation Shearith Israel on the Upper West Side of Manhattan.
