= Beth Rudin DeWoody =

American art patron (born 1952)

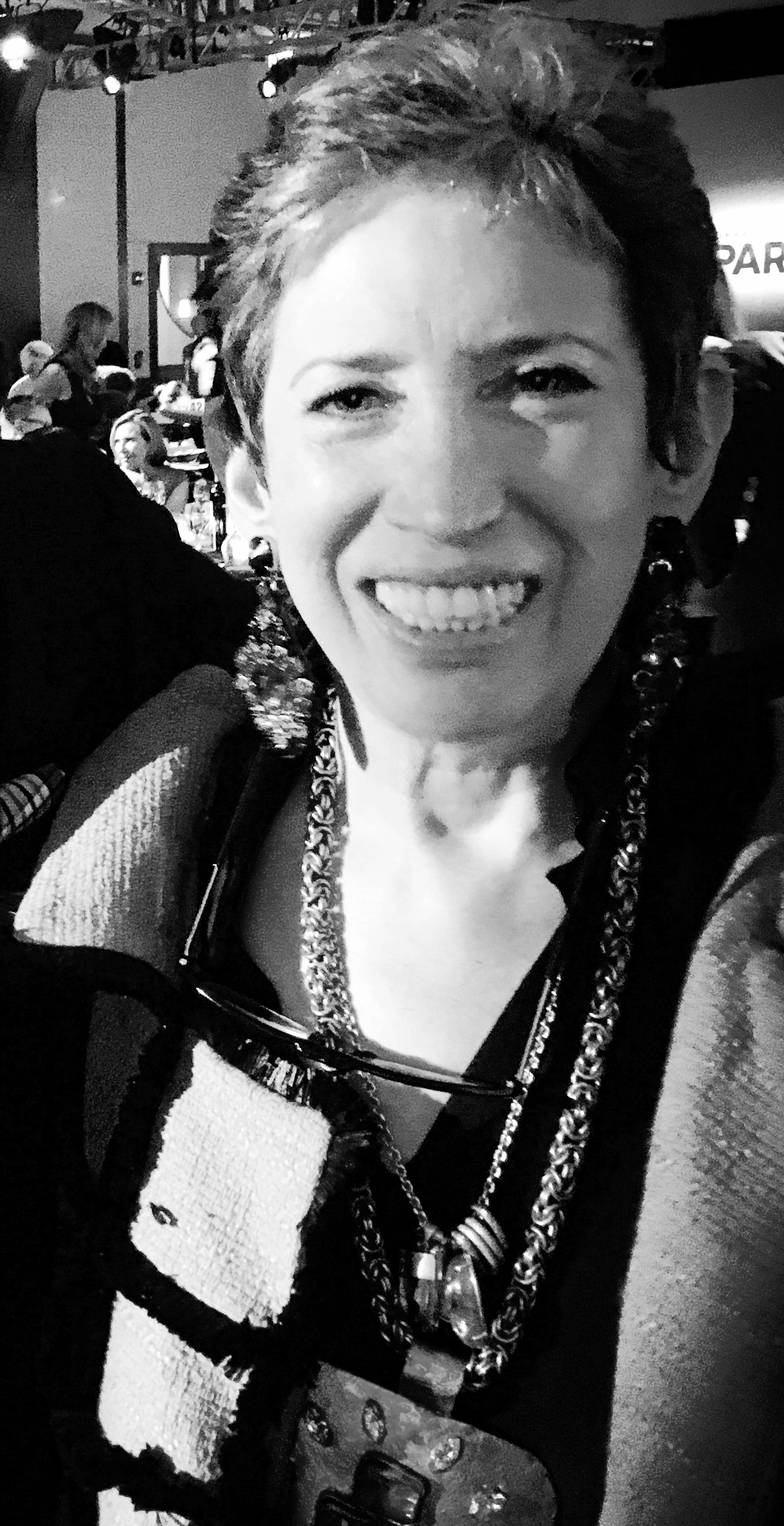
- DeWoody in 2016
- Born: 1952 (age 73–74)
- Education: University of California, Santa Barbara (BA)
- Occupations: Arts patron and philanthropist
- Spouse(s): James DeWoody (divorced); Stephen Bosniak (engaged, died 2007); Firooz Zahedi (divorced 2025)
- Children: 2
- Parent(s): Gladyce Largever Rudin; Lewis Rudin
- Relatives: Jack Rudin (uncle); Samuel Rudin (grandfather)

Beth Rudin DeWoody (born 1952) is an American art patron, collector, curator, and philanthropist.

== Biography ==
DeWoody was born to a Jewish family which controls a $5.1 billion real estate empire. She is the daughter of Gladyce (née Largever) and Lewis Rudin. She has one brother, William Rudin. Her parents later divorced and remarried: her father to Wilhelmina model Basha Szymanska, and then Rachel (Weingarten) Rudin; and her mother to film executive David Begelman.

DeWoody's interest in art started as child where she attended the Rudolf Steiner School after which she went on to earn a B.A. in anthropology and cinema studies from the University of California, Santa Barbara. She then worked as a production assistant on such movies as Hair (film) and Annie Hall. After marrying artist James DeWoody, she began to get deeply involved in the SoHo art scene where she began to nurture young contemporary artists such as E.V. Day and Tom Sachs. In 1982, she went to work for Rudin Management Company, owned by her father, where she rose to the rank of vice president. At the same time, she grew her art collection and sponsored new artists and served as a curator of exhibitions.

In 2001 comedian Ruby Wax portrayed a satirical menopausal maniac based on DeWoody in the BBC television comedy Absolutely Fabulous, season 4, episode 6.

== Philanthropy ==
DeWoody serves as President of the Rudin Family Foundation. She has sat on the boards of the Whitney Museum of American Art since the mid-1980s, Brooklyn Academy of Music, Creative Time, The New School University, Design Museum Holon in Israel, New Yorkers for Children, New York City Police Foundation, the Photography Steering Committee at the Norton Museum of Art located in West Palm Beach, Florida and the Hammer Museum in Los Angeles.

In 1990, DeWoody organized the "A Bid of Love" benefit auction at Sotheby's with ballet dancers Heather Watts, Jock Soto, and interior designer Jed Johnson.

== Personal life ==
DeWoody has been married twice. Her first husband was artist James DeWoody with whom she had two children: Kyle DeWoody (cofounder of Grey Area which markets artist-made wares) and artist and designer, Carlton. She was engaged to world renowned oculoplastic surgeon Stephen Bosniak, who died suddenly in 2007 of a leukemic crisis. In 2012, she married photographer Firooz Zahedi. She has homes in West Palm Beach, Manhattan, Los Angeles and Montecito, California.

== The Bunker Artspace ==
The Bunker Artspace, located in West Palm Beach, Florida, showcases contemporary art from the 10,000 pieces in the collection. Tom Sachs, Kehinde Wiley, Phillip Estland, John Waters, and Maynard Monrow are a few artists whose works DeWoody collects and displays at the Bunker.

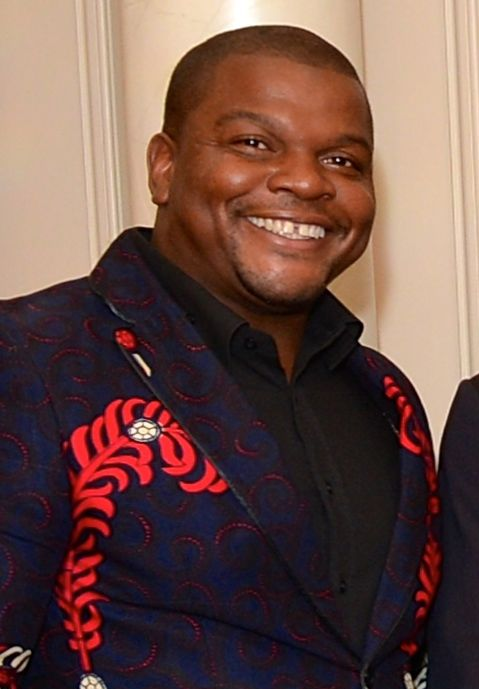
Kehinde Wiley, whose work appears in Bunker Artspace.
