= Rudin Center for Transportation Policy & Management =

New York University research center

The Rudin Center for Transportation Policy and Management is a research center in the Robert F. Wagner Graduate School of Public Service at New York University. The center leads research related to mobility in New York City in order to create and disseminate new ideas in transportation policy and planning. It aims to foster economic development in a more sustainable and equitable society by working with public, private and non-profit partners to support research. It seeks to focus attention on the linkages between transportation policy and other critical regional and national issues such as housing, economic development, energy security, health care, and education.

Established in 1996 and named in 2000 for New York City civic leader, founding chairman of the Association for a Better New York, and NYU alumnus Lewis Rudin, the Rudin Center is located in the historic Puck Building at 295 Lafayette Street in Manhattan. The center is headed by Sarah Kaufman, an academic and urban planner who previously worked for the New York Metropolitan Transportation Authority.
