= Firooz Zahedi =

American photographer of Iranian descent (born 1949)

- Born: Firooz Zahedi; 1949 (age 76–77); Tehran, Iran
- Occupation: Photographer
- Spouse: Beth Rudin DeWoody
- Children: 1
- Website: http://firoozzahedi.com/

Firooz Zahedi (born 1949) is an American photographer of Iranian descent.

== Early life and education ==
Firooz Zahedi was born in Tehran, Iran, in 1949. His family moved to England, where he received his secondary education. In 1969, he came to the US to attend Georgetown University in Washington DC., and received a degree from the Walsh School of Foreign Service.

After Georgetown, Zahedi worked at the Iranian embassy in Washington before leaving to attend Corcoran School of Art from which he received a degree in visual communication in 1976.

== Career ==
While at art school, he began photographing for Andy Warhol’s Interview magazine and served as its Washington DC correspondent.

In May 1976, he met and became friends with Elizabeth Taylor, and soon after, they traveled to Iran. The photographs from that trip, which included the actress dressed in local tribal costumes, alongside portraits he took of her on the set of A Little Night Music in Vienna, became the subject of the cover story of Andy Warhol's Interview magazine in October 1976.

In 1978, he accompanied Elizabeth Taylor to Hollywood as her personal photographer on the set of the film Return Engagement.

He settled in Los Angeles to pursue his photographic career. He subsequently moved to Los Angeles, and started his professional career as a photographer.

In 1988 he was assigned by Vanity Fair to shoot for the magazine. Soon after he was placed under contract by that publication. His editorial work has appeared internationally on the covers of such magazines as Vanity Fair, Vogue, GQ, Town & Country, Glamour, InStyle, Time, Architectural Digest and Entertainment Weekly.

Some of the celebrities he has photographed include Angelina Jolie, Jennifer Lopez, Cate Blanchett, Leonardo DiCaprio, Samuel L. Jackson, Bette Midler, Meryl Streep, Diane Keaton, Nicole Kidman, John Travolta, Oprah Winfrey and Ellen DeGeneres.

Zahedi shot covers for a number of Barbra Streisand's albums, including Release Me, Love is the Answer, Back to Broadway, and Timeless: Live in Concert.

Firooz has appeared as a guest photographer on CW's America's Next Top Model.

== Exhibitions ==
In February 2012, a collection of his photographs of Elizabeth Taylor in Iran was exhibited at the Los Angeles County Museum of Art.

His portraits and fine art photography have been shown in New York at the Staley Wise Gallery and Leila Heller Gallery. Internationally at the Laleh June Gallery in Basel, Switzerland, and the Doha and Dubai Art Fairs.

A solo show of his work, Firooz Zahedi: Photographs and collages was held April 26 to June 7, 2014, at the Paul Kopeikin Gallery in Los Angeles.

== Personal life ==
Zahedi's son, Darian, is also a photographer as well as a musician. He has played with bands including The Rondelles and CRX. In 2012, Zahedi married Beth Rudin DeWoody, daughter of New York City real estate developer Lewis Rudin.

== Selected works ==
=== Movie posters ===
- Pulp Fiction
- Edward Scissorhands
- The Addams Family
- Get Shorty
- Jackie Brown.

=== Publications ===
- Zahedi, F., Smith, L., & Colacello, B. (2016). My Elizabeth. Glitterati Incorporated.
- Rudick, J. A., & Zahedi, F. (2018). City of angels: Houses and gardens of Los Angeles. Vendome.
- Zahedi, F. (2020). Look at Me. Pointed Leaf Press.
- Porter, L. D., Zahedi, F., & Appleton, M. (2022). Montecito style: Paradise on California’s Gold Coast. The Monacelli Press.

=== Book covers ===
- Goldie, A Lotus Grows in the Mud by Goldie Hawn
- My Passion for Design by Barbra Streisand
- Prime Time by Jane Fonda

== Awards and recognition ==
The Lucie Awards recognized Zahedi as a 2023 Achievement in Entertainment honoree.
