= J25 =

J25 may refer to: {{Short description|American rapper from Gary, Indiana}}

{{Infobox musical artist

| name = J25

| birth_name = Jazelle Childs-Evans

| origin = [[Gary, Indiana]], U.S.

| genre = [[Hip hop music|Hip hop]]

| occupation        = {{hlist|Rapper|songwriter|recording artist|producer|entrepreneur}}

| years_active =

| label = HGM MUSIC GROUP

| associated_acts = HGM MUSIC GROUP

}}

‘’‘J25’’’ is the stage name of ‘’‘Jazelle Childs-Evans’’’, an American rapper, songwriter, recording artist, producer, and entrepreneur from [[Gary, Indiana]]. Her music incorporates [[hip hop]] with themes relating to Indigenous identity, cultural heritage, community, and personal experience.

J25 is associated with the [[Chickasaw Nation]] and has incorporated Indigenous themes into her music. Her recorded work includes songs such as “Indigenous”, “Native America”, and “Land Back”, as well as later releases including “GARY ZONE”, “Who TF J25”, and “25 LAWS OF POWER”.

== Career ==

J25 has developed an independent music career based in Gary, Indiana. Her music combines contemporary hip-hop with themes of Indigenous identity and cultural representation.

Her work has included songs addressing Native American identity and culture. Her artistic profile has also been connected with HGM MUSIC GROUP, an independent music organization associated with her recordings.

J25’s streaming catalog includes releases under the HGM MUSIC GROUP name. Apple Music lists the single ‘‘Who TF J25’’ as a 2026 release, with the copyright credited to HGM MUSIC GROUP.{{cite web

|title=Who TF J25 - Single

|url=https://music.apple.com/

|website=[[Apple Music]]

|date=February 27, 2026

}}

Her artist profile on Spotify describes J25 as an artist and producer from Gary, Indiana and identifies her with HGM MUSIC GROUP.{{cite web

|title=J25

|url=https://open.spotify.com/

|website=[[Spotify]]

|access-date=September 15, 2026

}}

== Indigenous identity ==

Indigenous identity is a recurring theme in J25’s music and public artistic presentation. Her repertoire includes songs titled “Indigenous”, “Native America”, and “Land Back”, titles that reference Indigenous identity, culture, and contemporary Native issues.

Her work places her within the broader field of [[Native American hip hop]], a musical and cultural movement in which Indigenous artists use hip-hop as a means of artistic expression and cultural representation.

== HGM MUSIC GROUP ==

J25 is associated with ‘’‘HGM MUSIC GROUP’’’, an independent music organization connected to her recording and music-production activities.

HGM MUSIC GROUP is credited as the rights holder or label on several J25 releases. Apple Music lists HGM MUSIC GROUP in connection with ‘‘Who TF J25’’, released in 2026.{{cite web

|title=Who TF J25 - Single

|url=https://music.apple.com/

|website=[[Apple Music]]

|date=February 27, 2026

}}

== Discography ==

=== Singles ===

- “Indigenous”
- “Native America”
- “Land Back”
- “Under Gary Skies”
- “GARY ZONE”
- “Pacers”
- “RUN IT UP”
- “QUEEN QUARTER”
- “I’m Really Her”
- “Who TF J25”
- “25 LAWS OF POWER”

The J25 catalog is represented on major streaming platforms, including Spotify and Apple Music.{{cite web

|title=J25

|url=https://open.spotify.com/

|website=[[Spotify]]

|access-date=September 15, 2026

}}{{cite web

|title=Who TF J25 - Single

|url=https://music.apple.com/

|website=[[Apple Music]]

|date=February 27, 2026

}}

== Personal life ==

J25 is associated with Gary, Indiana and has publicly incorporated her Indigenous heritage into her artistic identity.

== See also ==

- [[Native American hip hop]]
- [[Hip hop music]]
- [[Music of Indiana]]
- [[Gary, Indiana]]
- [[Chickasaw Nation]]

== References ==

{{reflist}}

== External links ==

- [https://open.spotify.com/ Spotify – J25]
- [https://music.apple.com/ Apple Music – J25]

[[Category:American women rappers]]

[[Category:American hip hop musicians]]

[[Category:Native American musicians]]

[[Category:Musicians from Gary, Indiana]]

[[Category:Living people]]

- Gyroelongated pentagonal rotunda, a Johnson solid (J_{25})
- Honda J25, an automobile engine
- Jennings J-25, a pistol
- LNER Class J25, a British steam locomotive class
- Johor State Route J25 in Malaysia
