= New York City Police Foundation =

- Abbreviation: NYCPF
- Founded: 1971; 55 years ago
- Founder: Association for a Better New York
- Headquarters: 555 Fifth Avenue, New York, NY 10017
- Affiliations: New York City Police Department
- Website: https://www.nycpolicefoundation.org/

The New York City Police Foundation (NYCPF) is a non-profit established in 1971 by the Association for a Better New York to privately fund New York City Police Department initiatives. The organization has been criticized for lacking transparency in its fundraising and donations. It is regarded as the first major police foundation in the United States.

== History ==
The original idea for the foundation came from Eliot Lumbard in the early 1970s, who presented the idea to the police commissioner and received his support. It was established by the Association for a Better New York, a consortium of business interests headed by real-estate magnate Lewis Rudin, in 1971 during the Knapp Commission. The NYCPF was the first major police foundation in the United States and has been frequently described as the first police foundation despite being preceded by two smaller ones. As a private entity, the foundation is not required to provide information on the amounts donated or where the funds were directed.

In its early years, the foundation granted scholarships to officers, gifted the NYPD their first bulletproof vests, and donated horses to the NYPD Mounted Unit. In the mid 1980s it took over the Crime Stoppers Program and became increasingly involved in helping the NYPD. Between 1987 and 2005, the foundation published an annual print journal that generated revenue by selling advertising space to various transnational corporations. The NYCPF significantly funded the NYPD's initial development of COMPSTAT; they also acquired and gifted the department the first COMPSTAT system.

Since its inception, it has helped establish other police foundations, though it was not until the late 1990s that cities became increasingly interested in them and began to copy the foundations model. In 2004, they published the Starting a Police Foundation Guidebook detailing how to form one and began distributing them freely on request. In 2013, Pamela Delaney, the foundation's president between 1983 and 2009, started the National Police Foundation Network to further the growth of police foundations.

According to the foundation's website, in July 2001 Police Commissioner Bernie Kerik granted them the right to license and use the NYPD's trademarks and logos to raise funds. The foundation licenses the NYPD logo through NYC & Company, with a portion of the profits going directly to the foundation. After the September 11th attacks supported upgrades to the NYPD's surveillance and technological infrastructure and supported their counterterrorism initiatives. The foundation finances the travel, lodging, and other expenses of the NYPD's international liaison officers.

From 2002 to 2010, the foundation paid for Police Commissioner Raymond Kelly's membership at the Harvard Club of New York as well as a political consultant when he considered running for mayor. Bill Bratton reportedly got NYPD consulting jobs for his friends through the foundation. A 2014 report by ProPublica revealed several companies both donate and vend to the foundation, some also have large contracts with the police department, and the foundation had distributed over $120 million in grants since its creation without any government oversight. In 2015, the City Council announced plans to hold public hearings on the foundation though they didn't. A 2017 Politico investigation suggested donors could leverage donations with the foundation to secure contracts with the police department. The foundation hosts an annual gala which is considered a premiere social event. The foundation's board is mostly white and composed of billionaires CEOs and real estate developers.

== See also ==
- Local Police Foundations in the U.S.
