= 345 Park Avenue =

Office skyscraper in Manhattan, New York

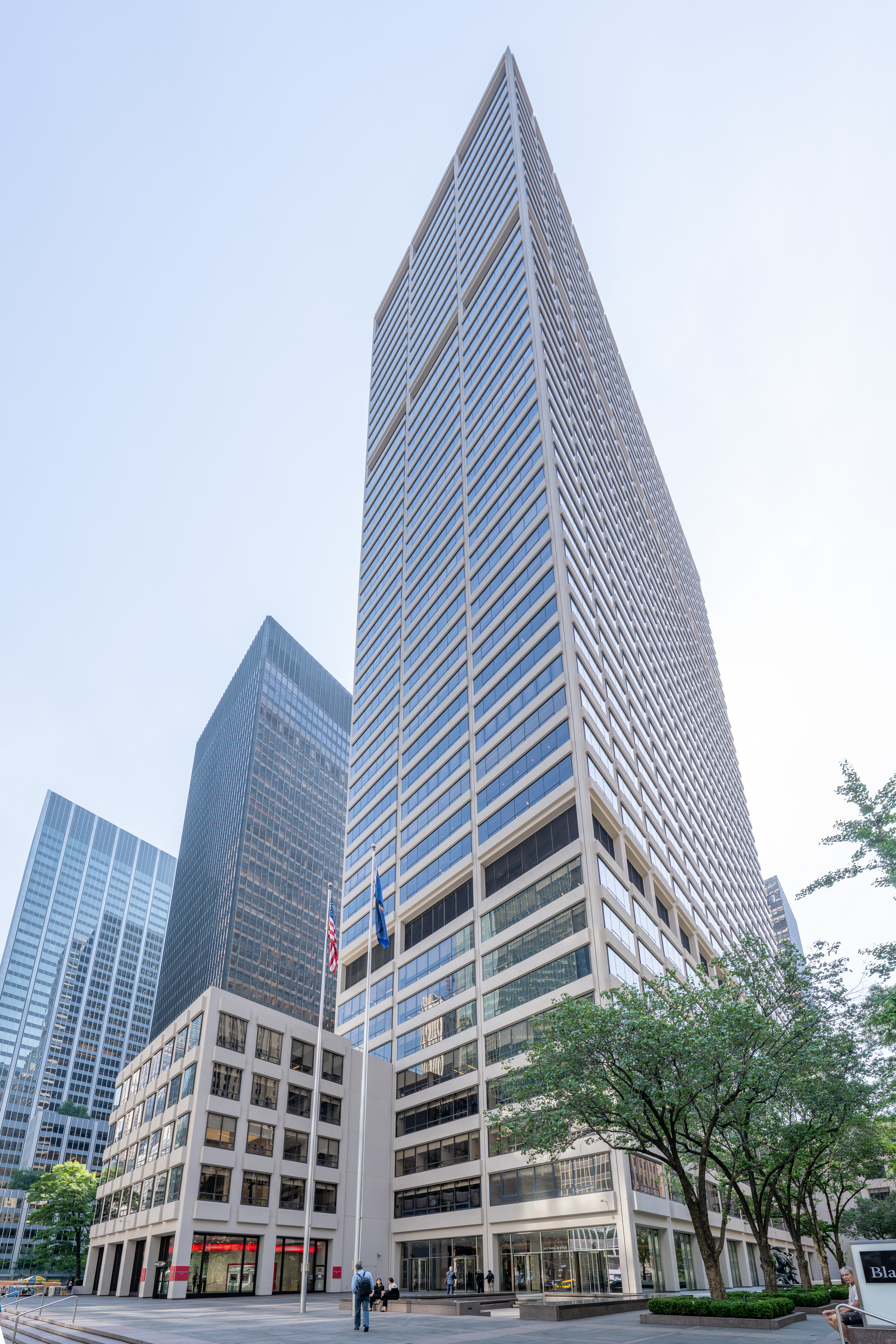
- 345 Park Avenue in 2026

General information
- Type: Office
- Architectural style: International
- Coordinates: 40.7578°N 73.9725°W
- Completed: 1969
- Owner: 345 Park Avenue, L.P.
- Landlord: Rudin Management

Height
- Roof: 634 ft (193 m)

Technical details
- Floor count: 44
- Floor area: 1,900,000 square feet (180,000 m^{2})

Design and construction
- Architect: Emery Roth & Sons
- Developer: Samuel Rudin

345 Park Avenue is a 634-foot (193 m) skyscraper in the Midtown Manhattan neighborhood of New York City. It occupies an entire city block bounded by Park Avenue, Lexington Avenue, 51st Street, and 52nd Street.

Completed in 1969, with 44 floors, the building was designed by Emery Roth & Sons. The building has its own assigned ZIP Code, 10154, making it one of 41 buildings in Manhattan that had their own ZIP Codes as of 2019. It is near the Racquet and Tennis Club and Park Avenue Plaza to the northeast; the Seagram Building to the north; 599 Lexington Avenue to the northeast; and St. Bartholomew's Episcopal Church and the General Electric Building to the south.

== History ==
345 Park Avenue is built on the block containing the former site of the Hotel Ambassador, which had opened in 1921, as well as several townhouses and tenement buildings. The Hotel Ambassador was sold to Sheraton Hotels in 1958 and renamed the Sheraton-East. In the 1960s, property developer Rudin Management Company bought adjacent property on the block, including the Gladstone Hotel, a nunnery, and a restaurant operated by Al Schacht. In the final property purchased on the block, it acquired the Sheraton-East itself in 1965, which was demolished in 1966 to make way for construction of a new office building.

The building designer was Emery Roth & Sons; Richard Roth Jr. was the lead design partner. He described it as "the roughest design problem I've ever had" because of the site's position between several historic buildings. In his design, Roth deliberately chose a light-colored façade so the building would "blend in and be less noticeable" rather than compete with its neighbors. Roth explicitly argued against "another black building on Park Avenue." The building was completed in 1969.

In 2024, Rudin announced the inclusion of an amenity complex in the building, with a fitness center and tenant lounge. A dining complex operated by Cyril Lignac opened in the building in 2026, with three restaurants.

On July 28, 2025, four people were killed and another five were injured in a mass shooting when 27-year-old Shane Tamura shot people with an AR-style rifle in the lobby and on the 33rd floor of the building. Tamura later killed himself.

== Plaza ==
The skyscraper is set back behind a 20,690-square-foot (1,922 m^{2}) public plaza that spans the entire blockfront on Park Avenue and extends back along a portion of the building's 51st Street frontage. The plaza allowed developer Samuel Rudin to obtain a zoning "bonus" for including open space under the terms of the city's 1961 Zoning Resolution; the plaza was placed on the west side of the site to be compatible with the adjacent open spaces at the Seagram Building and St. Bartholomew's Church. The plaza includes a 12-foot-high (3.7 m) sculpture by Robert Cook entitled "Dinoceras" that was dedicated in 1971 and commissioned by Jack and Lewis Rudin.

== Tenants ==
One of the building's early tenants was Blackstone, signing its original lease for only two floors in 1988. It has since expanded multiple times (2018, 2021, 2024) to approximately 1.06 million square feet across 28 floors — more than half the tower — through 2034, making it one of the largest single-building tenants in Midtown.

- The Blackstone Group
- East West Bank
- Loeb & Loeb LLP
- National Football League (since 2012)
- ClothesFlow.Co
- The Rudin Management Company, Inc.
- Wafra Inc.

== See also ==
- List of tallest buildings in New York City
