= Wendy's massacre =

2000 mass murder in Queens, New York City

- Location: 40°45′33.07″N 73°49′48.68″W; Flushing, New York, U.S.
- Date: May 24, 2000; 26 years ago 11:00 p.m. (Eastern Daylight Time)
- Target: Wendy's outlet
- Attack type: Robbery; homicide; mass shooting
- Weapon: Bryco-Jennings Model J38 .380 ACP semi-automatic pistol
- Deaths: 5
- Injuries: 2
- Perpetrators: Craig Godineaux, John Taylor

The Wendy's massacre was a mass murder that took place in a Wendy's fast-food restaurant at 40-12 Main Street in Flushing, Queens, New York City, on May 24, 2000. The perpetrators fatally shot five people and wounded two others. The killings were committed by former Wendy's employee John Taylor along with Craig Godineaux, who had planned to rob the restaurant's safe. Taylor was subsequently sentenced to death (later changed to life imprisonment without parole), while Godineaux was sentenced to life in prison without parole. After the shooting, the Wendy's was closed and boarded up until it was eventually reopened as a shopping center. It remains one of the deadliest mass shootings in New York City history, alongside the 2025 Midtown Manhattan shooting, 25 years later.

== Robbery and killing of employees ==
The killings were carried out by 36-year-old John Taylor (born October 23, 1964), a former employee of the restaurant and a Brownsville, Brooklyn resident, and his 30-year-old accomplice and Bronx native Craig Godineaux (born February 4, 1970). The robbery was carefully planned, as Taylor forced his former manager, Jean Auguste, to summon the six employees to his office on the pretense of having an important meeting. Taylor and Godineaux took the seven employees into the restaurant's freezer, bound and gagged them at gunpoint, put plastic bags over their heads, and then shot each of them in the head with a Bryco-Jennings Model J38 .380 caliber semi-automatic pistol. One victim was also shot in the chest, and 8 shell casings were found. All but two of them died. Jaquione Johnson survived despite being shot from the top of his head, with the bullet travelling between the two cerebral hemispheres, through the nasal cavity and out the mouth. The second survivor, Patricio Castro, dialed 9-1-1. When police arrived, they found all the victims and discovered US$2,400 (equivalent to $4,500 in 2025) missing from the safe.

== Arrests and trial ==
The New York City Police Department (NYPD) arrested Taylor and Godineaux less than 48 hours after the killings. Evidence quickly mounted against the pair, including eyewitness testimony, ballistics, and fingerprints. On January 22, 2001, Godineaux pleaded guilty and was later sentenced to life in prison. Judge Steven W. Fisher instructed the jury that he would most likely sentence Taylor to 175 years in prison if the jury did not return a unanimous verdict on the death penalty. On November 19, 2002, Taylor was convicted of five counts of first-degree murder. One week later, on November 26, the jury sentenced Taylor to death. Godineaux avoided the death penalty as his childhood IQ test was under 70 and by law was labelled as "mentally retarded".

== Post-conviction ==
In 2004, New York State's death penalty statute was declared unconstitutional by the New York Court of Appeals due to a flaw in its mandated instructions to juries. The Queens County District Attorney fought to have Taylor's case declared an exception to the decision, but were unsuccessful. As a result, on October 23, 2007, the New York Court of Appeals vacated the death penalty portion of Taylor's verdict. At this time, Taylor was the last remaining inmate on death row in New York. On November 29, 2007, Taylor was re-sentenced to life without parole for the five murders.

As of 2025, Taylor is serving his life without parole sentence at the Wende Correctional Facility, in Alden, New York, 340 miles (550 km) northwest of New York City, where he was moved to in 2003; Godineaux is serving his life without parole sentence at the Shawangunk Correctional Facility, in Wallkill, Ulster County, New York, 72 miles (116 km) north of New York City, where he was moved to in 2001.

== Victims ==
Killed in the massacre were:

- Jean Dumel Auguste, 27
- Ali Ibadat, 40
- Jeremy Mele, 18
- Ramon Nazario, 44
- Anita C. Smith, 23

Seriously wounded:

- Patricio (Patrick) Castro, 23
- Jaquione Johnson, 18
