= PS 166 (Manhattan) =

School in Manhattan, NY

Coordinates: 40°47′20.39″N 73°58′21.13″W

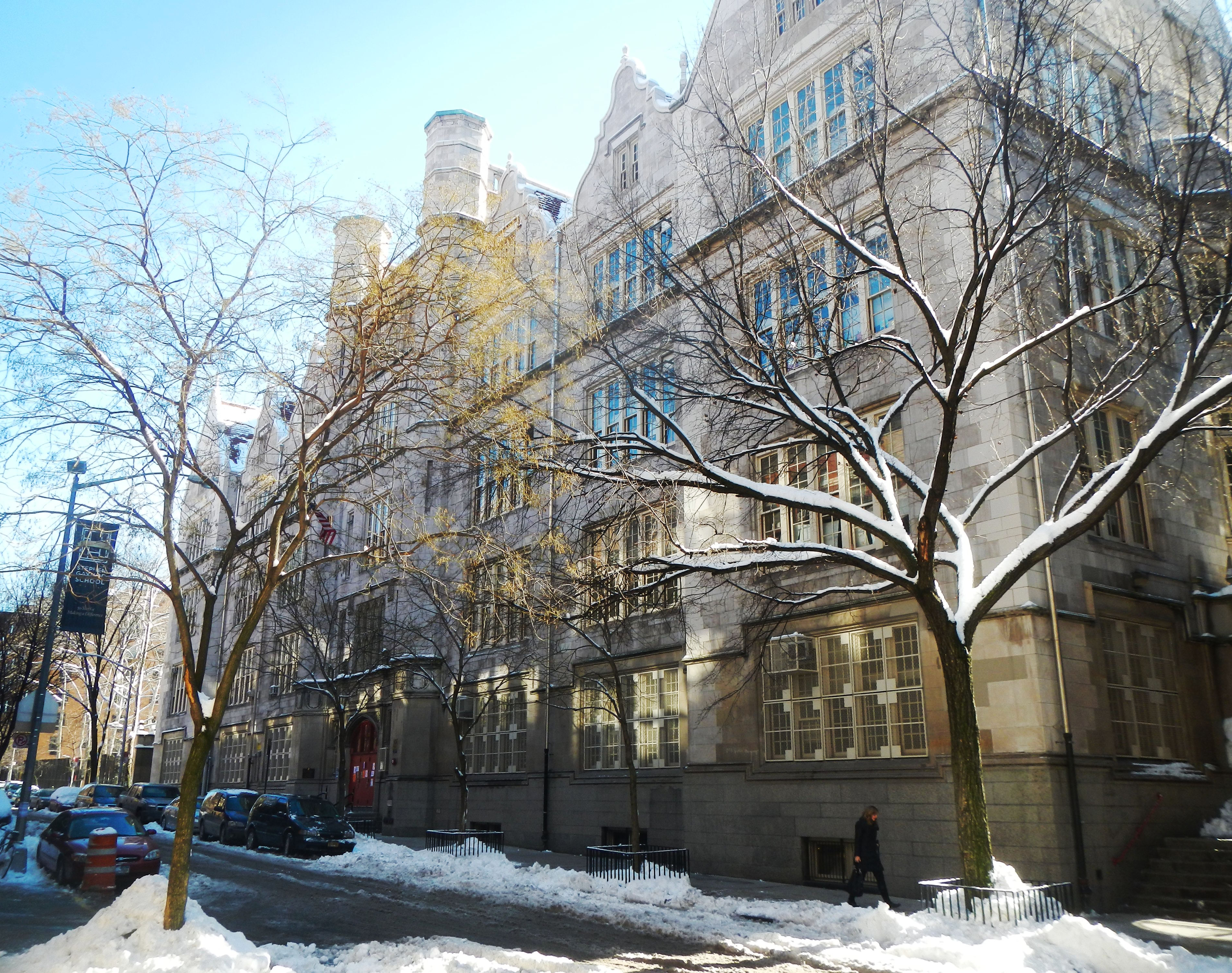

Location
- 132 West 89th Street; New York City, New York; United States

Information
- Established: September 1899; 126 years ago
- Principal: Debra Mastriano
- Grades: K-5
- Enrollment: c.600
- Website: www.ps166.org

Public School 166, the Richard Rodgers School of Arts & Technology, is a public school administered by the New York City Department of Education and located in the city's Upper West Side neighborhood of the borough of Manhattan. An elementary school, it serves about 600 pupils in kindergarten through fifth grade.

The building, located on West 89th Street between Columbus and Amsterdam avenues, was designed by C. B. J. Snyder, built in 1897-98 and opened in September 1899. It was completely renovated and modernized in 1995 and designated a New York City landmark in 2000. Although the school is still referred to as PS 166, it was formally renamed in honor of former student Richard Rodgers in 2003.

== Notable alumni ==
- Graham Diamond – satire, fantasy, fiction and nonfiction author
- Joey Diaz – comedian, actor
- Ronnie Eldridge – former New York City councilwoman
- Everett Raymond Kinstler – artist, portrait painter
- Jeffrey Lesser – music and tv producer/director
- Melissa Manchester – singer-songwriter
- Richard Rodgers – composer
- Lewis and Jack Rudin – owners of the Rudin Management real estate development firm
- J. D. Salinger – novelist, author of Catcher in the Rye
- Jonas Salk – medical researcher and polio vaccine developer
- Edwin Schlossberg – museum designer and husband of Caroline Kennedy
- Jeffrey Toobin – lawyer, author, and legal analyst for the New Yorker
