= James DeWoody =

American painter

- Born: May 31, 1945 (age 81); Fort Smith, Arkansas, US
- Education: Pratt Institute, Tulane University,
- Known for: Painting, Printmaking, Sculpture
- Spouse: Beth Rudin DeWoody (divorced)
- Children: Carlton DeWoody; Kyle DeWoody
- Website: www.jamesdewoody.com

James DeWoody (born 1945) is an American painter, printmaker, and sculptor who has worked in New York City since 1972. He was born in Ft. Smith, Arkansas, but grew up in Texarkana, Texas. He received his BA degree in English and Studio Art from Tulane University in 1967. DeWoody received his MFA degree from Pratt Institute in 1975 in painting, new forms, and art history, studying under George McNeil.

DeWoody is also a professor at the New York Institute of Technology in New York City where he teaches drawing, painting, printmaking, and art history. He previously taught studio courses at New York University and the Philadelphia College of Art.

== Paintings, prints and sculpture ==
DeWoody paints in acrylic on canvas and paper, makes prints using a variety of techniques, principally pochoir and screened monoprints, and creates sculptures, primarily in fabricated and painted steel.

The style and subject matter of DeWoody's work has evolved significantly over the years. His earliest work was figurative. His work became totally abstract in the 1970s, when he created paintings and prints with collaged, multi-colored torn papers, which gave them a sculptural dimension, and a series of works incorporating abstracted towers and zig zags. He returned to figurative work in the 1980s and years since, but with a wide range of techniques and subject matter, in several series of works, including "heroic" portraits of sports figures and buildings. Most of these were created with a hard-edged pochoir technique which DeWoody adapted from the earlier French pochoir tradition. Subsequently, he moved to screened monoprinting for a series of portraits of "Perps", "Babes", and Asians. Most recently the Asian series has shifted to Asian-made objects: Japanese porcelain figures and Chinese plastic toys in conversation tableaux.

DeWoody works regularly with master printer Roni Henning in Brooklyn and is featured in her book Water-Based Screenprinting Today: From Hands-On Techniques to Digital Technology (2006) and on her website.

He has also designed theatre sets, illustrated books, painted fourteen Stations of the Cross for the Church of the Heavenly Rest in Manhattan, and designed a fountain and gateway at the Federal Courthouse in Texarkana, Texas-Arkansas. B'way Boog, one of his largest paintings (11' x 8'), hangs in the lobby of the office building at 1675 Broadway, New York City. His public steel sculpture Big Zig is installed at 60 Henry Street in Manhattan.

== Collections ==
DeWoody's work is in many public, corporate, and private collections. These include the Metropolitan Museum of Art, the National Gallery of Art in Washington, D.C., the Library of the Whitney Museum of American Art, the Parrish Art Museum in Southampton, the Museum of the Rhode Island School of Design, the Library of Congress, the Fitzwilliam Museum of Cambridge University, Rutgers University, the Cleveland Center for Contemporary Art, and Time Warner. His work has also been reviewed in many publications, including the New York Times and Art News.

== Exhibitions ==
DeWoody's work has been shown in many solo exhibitions, including in Gallery 61, Arthur Roger Gallery in New York City and New Orleans, and Mary Ryan Gallery in New York City, More Gallery in Philadelphia, Molly Barnes Gallery in Los Angeles. His work has also been shown in many group exhibitions, including the Century Association in New York City, the Meadows Museum of Art, Shreveport, Louisiana, and the Parrish Museum of Art, Southampton, New York. His work was included in a travelling exhibition entitled All-Stars: American Sporting Prints from the Collection of Reba & Dave Williams which was shown in numerous museums across the United States.

== Personal life ==
He was married to Beth Rudin DeWoody, daughter of New York real estate developer Lewis Rudin; they have since divorced. They had two children: son Carlton DeWoody and daughter Kyle DeWoody. Carlton is also an artist and Kyle runs an art boutique in Manhattan.
