= Police foundation =

Charitable organization with the aim of improving policing

A police foundation is a charitable organization with the aim of improving policing.

In many cities, counties and states throughout the United States, local charitable organizations or "police foundations" have been created. Police foundations—nonprofit organizations that help raise money and provide resources for police programs, equipment, and special needs that cannot be readily provided through public sector funds—offer a promising source of support in bridging funding gaps. This often includes support for specialized training and equipment that is important for citizen and officer safety, including body armor and support for community programs associated with public safety, such as youth Police Explorer programs. In 2010, it was estimated that at least 25 local police foundations existed, although nearly 100 are listed below. These foundations have proved controversial in some locations.

In the United States, the Police Foundation (also known as the National Police Foundation) operates at a national level but does not operate in the same way as local police foundations and has no affiliation with local foundations. Instead, the National Police Foundation conducts and translates scientific research, training, technical assistance and evaluation to advance policing. In the United Kingdom, the Police Foundation (UK) describes itself as "the UK's policing think tank".

In 2011, the U.S. Department of Justice's Office of Community Oriented Policing Services (COPS Office) partnered with the Target Corporation to hold a series of training workshops around the U.S. to "provide business leaders, elected officials, police chiefs, and foundation board members and staff with the basic tools to establish and grow a police foundation". These workshops were conducted by representatives of the New York City Police Foundation.

== List ==
A listing of local police foundations is provided below:

Foundation	City, state (country)	Website
Abbotsford Police Foundation	Abbotsford, BC (Canada)	http://www.abbotsfordpolicefoundation.org//
Albemarle County Police Foundation	Albemarle County, VA	http://www.acpdfoundation.org//
Alexandria Police Foundation	Alexandria, VA	http://www.alexandriapolicefoundation.org/
Arkansas State Police Foundation	Arkansas	http://aspfoundation.com/
Atlanta Police Foundation	Atlanta, GA	https://www.atlantapolicefoundation.org/
Baltimore County Police Foundation	Baltimore, MD	http://www.thebcpf.com/
Bellevue Police Foundation	Bellevue, WA	https://bellevuepolicefoundation.org/
Boston Police Foundation	Boston, MA	https://bostonpolicefoundation.org/
Bozeman Police Foundation	Bozeman, MT	https://bozemanpolicefoundation.org/
Burbank Police Foundation	Burbank, CA	https://burbankpolicefoundation.org/
Camden Police Foundation	Camden, NJ	http://camdenpolicefoundation.org/
Central Indiana Police Foundation	Central Indiana	https://cipf.foundation/
Charlotte-Meckelenburg Police Foundation	Charlotte, NC	https://charlottepolicefoundation.org/
Charlottesville Police Foundation	Charlottesville, VA	http://www.cvillepolicefoundation.org/
Chesterfield County Police Foundation, Inc.	Chesterfield County, VA	http://chesterfieldpolicefoundation.org/
Chicago Police Foundation	Chicago, IL	https://www.cpdmemorial.org/
Chula Vista Police Foundation	Chula Vista, CA	https://chulavistapolicefoundation.org/
Cleveland Police Foundation	Cleveland, OH	https://clevelandpolicefoundation.org/
Clovis Police Foundation	Clovis, CA	http://clovispolicefoundation.org/
Colorado Springs Police Foundation	Colorado Springs, CO	http://www.policefoundationofcoloradosprings.org/
Columbus Police Foundation	Columbus, OH	http://www.thecolumbuspolicefoundation.org/
Cypress Police Foundation	Cypress, CA	http://cypresspf.org//
Daytona Beach Police Foundation	Daytona Beach, FL	https://www.daytonabeachpolicefoundation.org/
Denver Police Foundation	Denver, CO	https://www.denverpolicefoundation.org/
Edmonds Police Foundation	Edmonds, WA	http://www.edmondspolicefoundation.org/
Edmonton Police Foundation	Edmonton, AB (Canada)	https://www.edmontonpolicefoundation.com/
El Paso Police Foundation	El Paso, TX	http://www.elpasopolicefoundation.org/
Evansville Police Foundation	Evansville, IN	https://evansvillepolicefoundation.org/
Fairfax County Police Foundation	Fairfax County, VA	http://www.fairfaxfoundation.org/
Fayetteville Police Foundation	Fayetteville, NC	https://fayettevillepolicefoundation.org/
Fishers Police Foundation	Fishers, IN	https://www.fishers.in.us/1101/Fishers-Police-Foundation
Front Royal Police Foundation	Front Royal, VA	http://www.frontroyalpolicefoundation.org/
Gaithersburg Police Foundation	Gaithersburg, MD	http://www.gaithersburgpolicefoundation.com/
Gardena Police Foundation	Gardena, CA	http://www.gardenapolicefoundation.org/
Gastonia Police Foundation	Gastonia, NC	https://www.gastoniapolicefoundation.com/
Glendale Police Foundation	Glendale, CA	https://www.glendaleca.gov/government/departments/police-department/community-outreach/glendale-police-foundation
Greensboro Police Foundation	Greensboro, NC	http://www.greensboropolicefoundation.org/
Greater Idaho Falls Police Foundation	Idaho Falls, ID	https://ifpolicefoundation.org/
Greenville Police Foundation	Greenville, SC	https://greenvillepolicefoundation.org/
Henrico Police Foundation	Henrico, VA	https://www.henricopolicefoundation.org/
Howard County Police Foundation	Howard County, MD	https://hcpf.org/
Juno Beach Police Foundation	Juno Beach, FL	https://www.jbpf.info
Jupiter Police Foundation	Jupiter, FL	https://www.jupiterpolicefoundation.org/
Kettering Police Foundation	Kettering, OH	https://www.ketteringoh.org/kettering-police-foundation/
Lancaster Police Foundation	Lancaster, PA	http://www.lancasterpolice.com/PoliceFoundation/index.htm
Lexington Police Foundation	Lexington, VA	http://www.lexingtonpolicefoundation.org/
Lodi Police Foundation	Lodi, CA	http://lodipolicefoundation.org/
Long Beach Police Foundation	Long Beach, CA	https://lbpolicefoundation.org/
Los Angeles Police Foundation	Los Angeles, CA	https://www.lapolicefoundation.org/
Los Gatos & Monte Sereno Police Foundation	Los Gatos, CA	http://lgmspolicefoundation.org/
Louisville Police Foundation	Louisville, KY	https://www.saferlouisville.com/
Lynchburg Police Foundation	Lynchburg, VA	https://www.lynchburgpolicefoundation.org/
Marco Island Police Foundation	Marco Island, FL	https://www.marcopolicefoundation.org/
Milton Police Foundation	Milton, WA	http://www.miltonpolicefoundation.us/
Minnesota Chiefs of Police Foundation	Woodbury, MN	http://www.mnchiefs.org/mcpa-foundation
Newark Police Foundation	Newark, NJ	http://newarkpolicefoundation.org/
Newport News Police Foundation	Newport News, VA	http://nnpolicefoundation.org/
New Orleans Police & Justice Foundation	New Orleans, LA	https://nopjf.org/
New York City Police Foundation	New York, NY	https://www.nycpolicefoundation.org/
Norcross Police Foundation	Norcross, GA	(Under revision)
Northeastern Massachusetts Police Foundation	Northeastern MA	https://nemlecfoundation.org/
Oakland Police Foundation	Oakland, CA	https://oaklandpolicefoundation.com/
Olathe Police Foundation	Olathe, KS	http://olathepolicefoundation.org/
Oregon State Police Foundation	Salem, OR	(Under revision)
Palm Beach Police Foundation	Palm Beach, FL	http://www.pbpolicefoundation.org/
Palm Beach Gardens Police and Fire Foundation	Palm Beach Gardens, FL	https://pbgpoliceandfirefoundation.org/
Palos Park Police Foundation	Palos Park, IL	http://www.palosparkpolicefoundation.org/
Pasadena Police Foundation	Pasadena, CA	http://ww2.cityofpasadena.net/blog/police/?p=580/
Philadelphia Police Foundation	Philadelphia, PA	http://www.phillypolicefoundation.org/
Pittsburgh Police Foundation	Pittsburgh, PA	https://www.facebook.com/pages/category/Nonprofit-Organization/Pittsburgh-Police-Foundation-325156164256120/
Pocono Mountain Police Foundation	Pocono Mountain, PA	http://www.pmrpf.com/index.html
Prescott Valley Police Foundation	Prescott Valley, AZ	https://pvpolicefoundation.org/
Rochester Police Foundation	Rochester, NY	https://www.rochesterpolicefoundation.org/
Riverside Police Foundation	Riverside, CA	https://www.riversidepolicefoundation.org/
Riverton Police Foundation	Riverton, WY	http://www.rivertonwy.gov/departments/police/police_foundation1/index.php
Royal Canadian Mounted Police Foundation	Ottawa, ON, (Canada)	https://rcmp-f.ca/
Sacramento Police Foundation	Sacramento, CA	https://www.sacpolicefoundation.org/
Saint Paul Police Foundation	Saint Paul, MN	https://www.saintpaulpolicefoundation.com/
St. Louis Police Foundation	St. Louis, MO	https://www.stlouispolicefoundation.org/
Salem Police Foundation	Salem, OR	http://www.salempolicefoundation.blogspot.com/
San Diego Police Foundation	San Diego, CA	https://www.sdpolicefoundation.org/
Santa Ana Police Foundation	Santa Ana, CA	https://www.sapdf.org//
Santa Barbara Police Foundation	Santa Barbara, CA	http://www.santabarbarapolicefoundation.org/
Scotch Plains Police Foundation	Scotch Plain, NJ	http://scotchplainspolicefoundation.org/
Seattle Police Foundation	Seattle, WA	https://www.seattlepolicefoundation.org/
Shawnee Police Foundation	Shawnee, OK	http://www.shawneeok.org/PublicSafety/Police/foundation//
Simi Valley Police Foundation	Simi Valley, CA	https://www.svpf.org/
Stamford Police Foundation	Stamford, CT	https://stamfordpolicefoundation.org//
Saint Paul Police Foundation	Saint Paul, MN	https://www.stpaulpolicefoundation.com/
Tempe Police Foundation	Tempe, AZ	http://tempepolicefoundation.org///
Toledo Police Foundation	Toledo, OH	https://toledopolicefoundation.org/
Toms River Police Foundation	Toms River, NJ	https://www.tomsriverpolicefoundation.org/
Tucson Police Foundation	Tucson, AZ	http://www.tucsonpolicefoundation.org/
Tustin Police Foundation	Tustin, CA	http://www.tustinpolicefoundation.org/
Upland Police Foundation	Upland, CA	http://www.uplandpolicefoundation.com/
Vancouver Police Foundation	Vancouver, BC (Canada)	https://www.vancouverpolicefoundation.org/
Virginia Association of Chiefs of Police and Foundation	Henrico, VA	https://www.vachiefs.org/
Virginia Beach Police Foundation	Virginia Beach, VA	http://www.vbpolicefoundation.org/
Washington Police Foundation	Washington, DC	http://www.dcpolicefoundation.org/
Waynesboro Police Foundation	Waynesboro, VA	https://www.waynesboropolicefoundation.com/
West Bloomfield Police Foundation	West Bloomfield, MI	http://wbpolicefoundation.org/
Winston-Salem Police Foundation	Winston-Salem, NC	https://wspolicefoundation.org/
Wichita Police & Fire Foundation	Wichita, KS	https://www.wichitapolicefoundation.org/
Woodstock Police Foundation	Woodstock, GA	http://www.wpfoundation.org/ http://www.wpfoundation.org

== See also ==
- Police academy
- Police
- Law enforcement agency
- National Police Foundation
