= 350 Park Avenue =

Planned building in Manhattan, New York

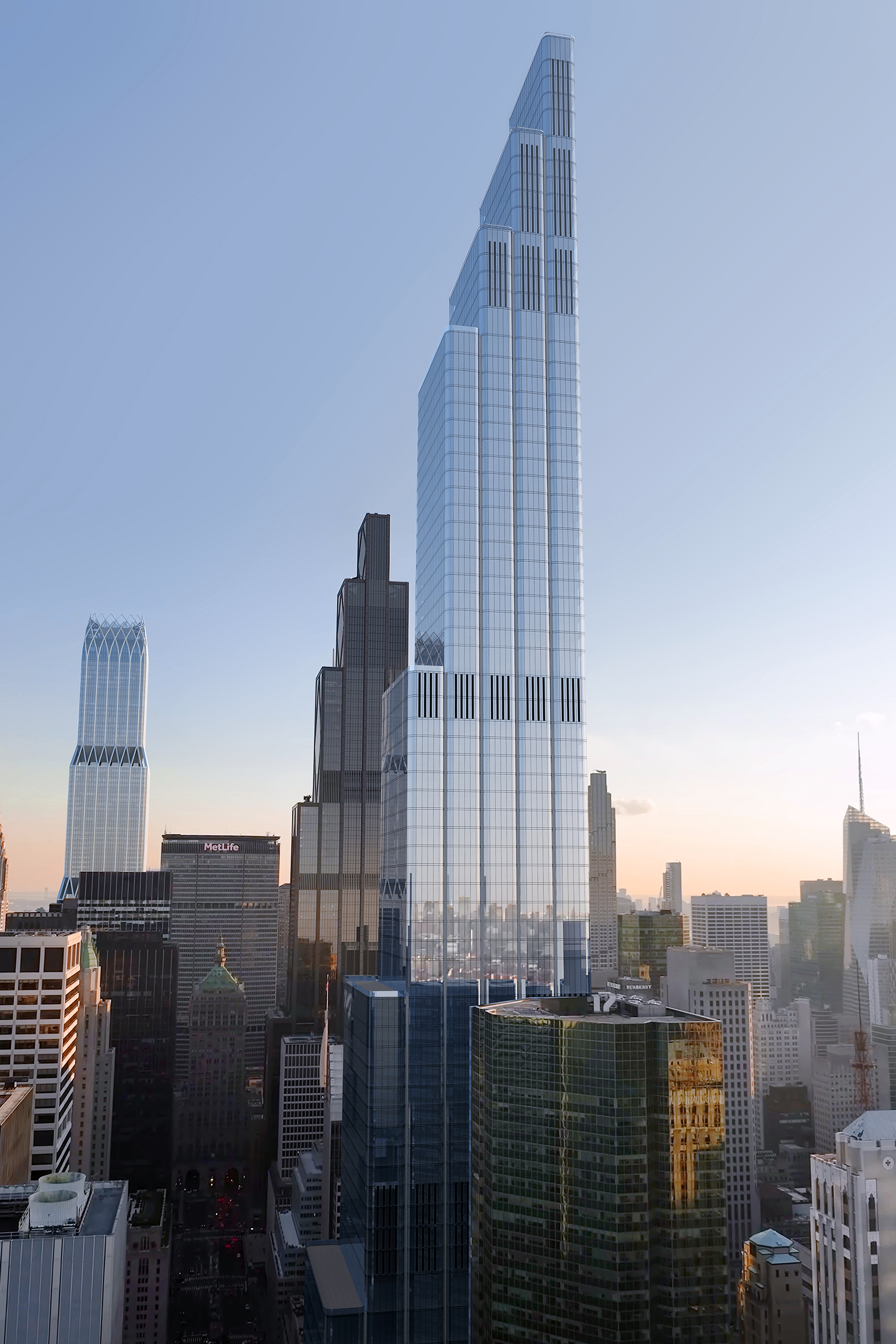
- Artist's impression

General information
- Status: Proposed
- Architectural style: Modernism, Neo-Futurism
- Location: 350 Park Avenue, New York, NY 10022, USA
- Coordinates: 40.7583°N 73.9739°W

Height
- Height: 1,413 feet (431 m)

Technical details
- Floor count: 62
- Floor area: 1,800,000 square feet (170,000 m^{2})

Design and construction
- Architects: Foster and Partners, AAI Architects, P.C. (as architect of record)
- Developer: Vornado Realty Trust, Rudin Management

350 Park Avenue is a planned supertall office tower in Midtown Manhattan, New York City, designed by Foster + Partners and developed by Vornado Realty Trust and Rudin Management.

Citadel LLC, and an associated entity, Citadel Securities, have committed to act as anchor tenants. The firm is also involved in the development and design of the building. Citadel leased space in the building currently on the site.

If built as proposed, the building will have 62 stories, and be approximately 1,413-foot-tall (431 m) in height. Plans call for 1,800,000 square feet (170,000 m^{2}) of commercial office space, of which Citadel will occupy approximately 850,000 square feet (79,000 m^{2}). The proposal also includes the construction of a 12,500-square-foot public concourse fronting onto Park Avenue and a contribution of over $35.8 million for the city's East Midtown Public Realm Improvement Fund, as part of its public-private agreement in conjunction with the City of New York.

== History ==
Vornado Realty Trust's initial proposal for a skyscraper at 350 Park Avenue was first revealed in 2019 through a marketing brochure. The Foster + Partners design featuring angular, glass-curtain wall facades and twin spires that would reach an estimated height of almost 1,500 feet (460 m).

In January 2023, Bloomberg reported that the hedge fund Citadel planned to build a tower at the site, with a height of roughly 1,350 feet (410 m) over 51 floors and containing 1,700,000 square feet (160,000 m^{2}) of commercial space, of which Citadel planned to occupy 54%. The plan involved a new design for the tower, also by Foster + Partners, featuring seven outdoor terraces. Eric Adams, then mayor of New York City, revealed details and renderings of the proposal at a meeting of the Association for a Better New York in April 2024. This design called for a revised height of 1,413 feet (431 m) and 62 stories. To permit the additional height, Citadel and Rudin Management would acquire development rights from the nearby St. Bartholomew's Episcopal Church and St. Patrick's Cathedral.

Ken Griffin of Citadel submitted plans for 350 Park Avenue to the New York City Department of Buildings in January 2025. The next month, the city started the Uniform Land Use Review Procedure process for the building. After the New York City Council approved the development that October, Vornado applied for construction permits the next month. Griffin threatened to cancel the project in 2026 after Mayor Zohran Mamdani proposed levying a tax on Griffin's personal apartment at 220 Central Park South, but Vornado CEO Steven Roth indicated in July that work would proceed as planned. The next month, Vornado and Griffin received a $3.3 billion loan for the tower, and Vornado took a 36% ownership stake; the loan was finalized in October.

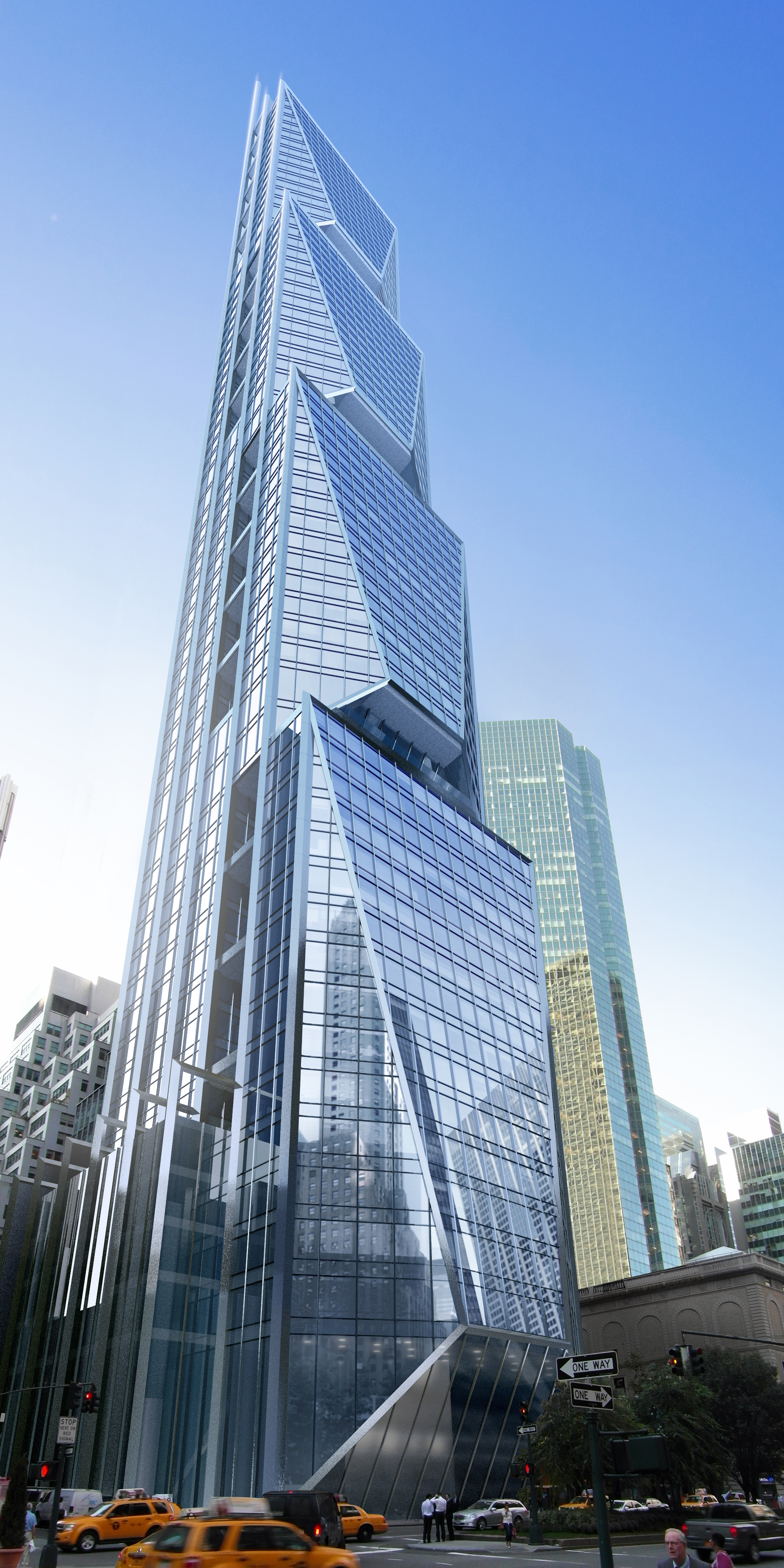
2019 design

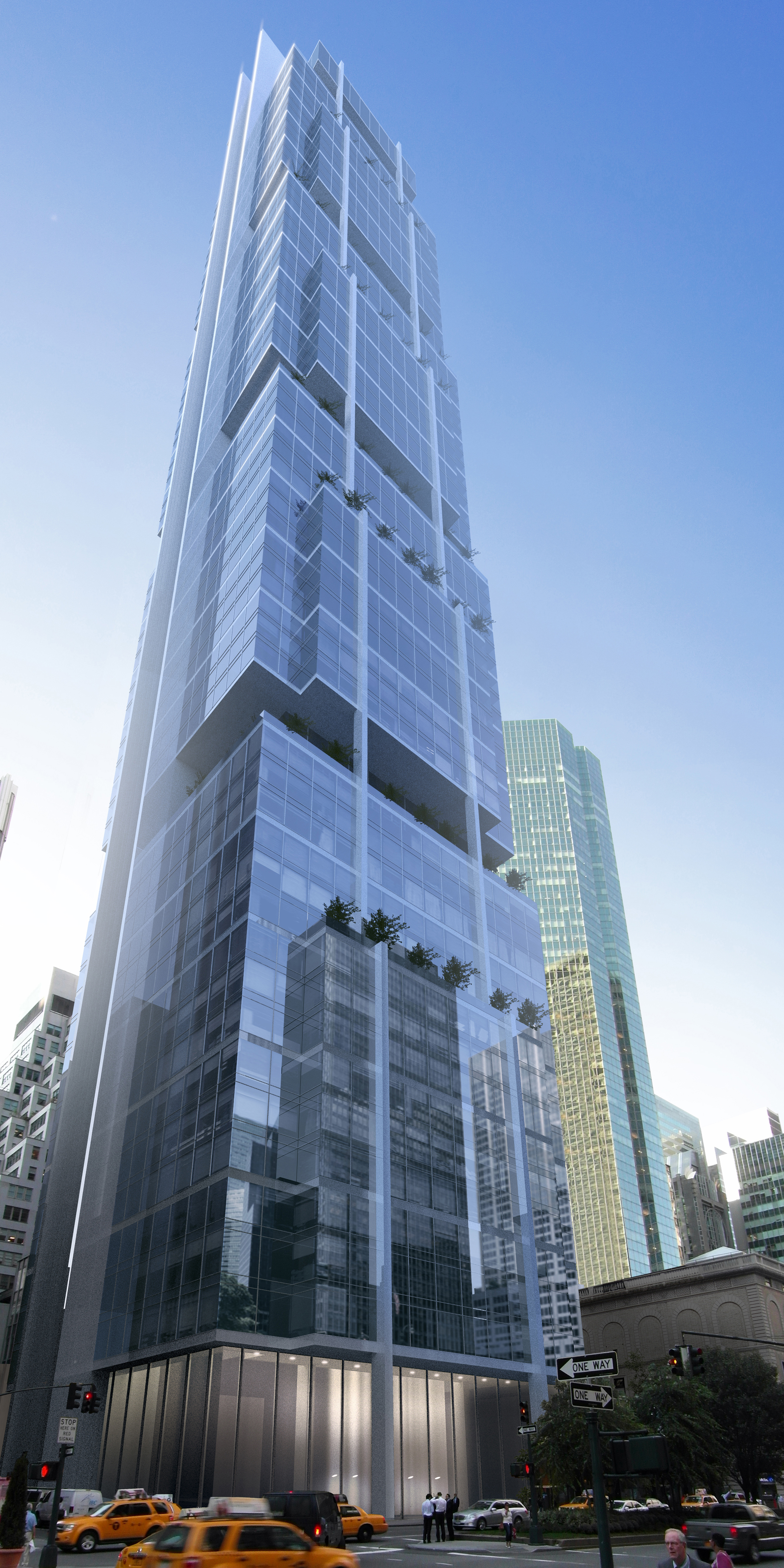
2023 design

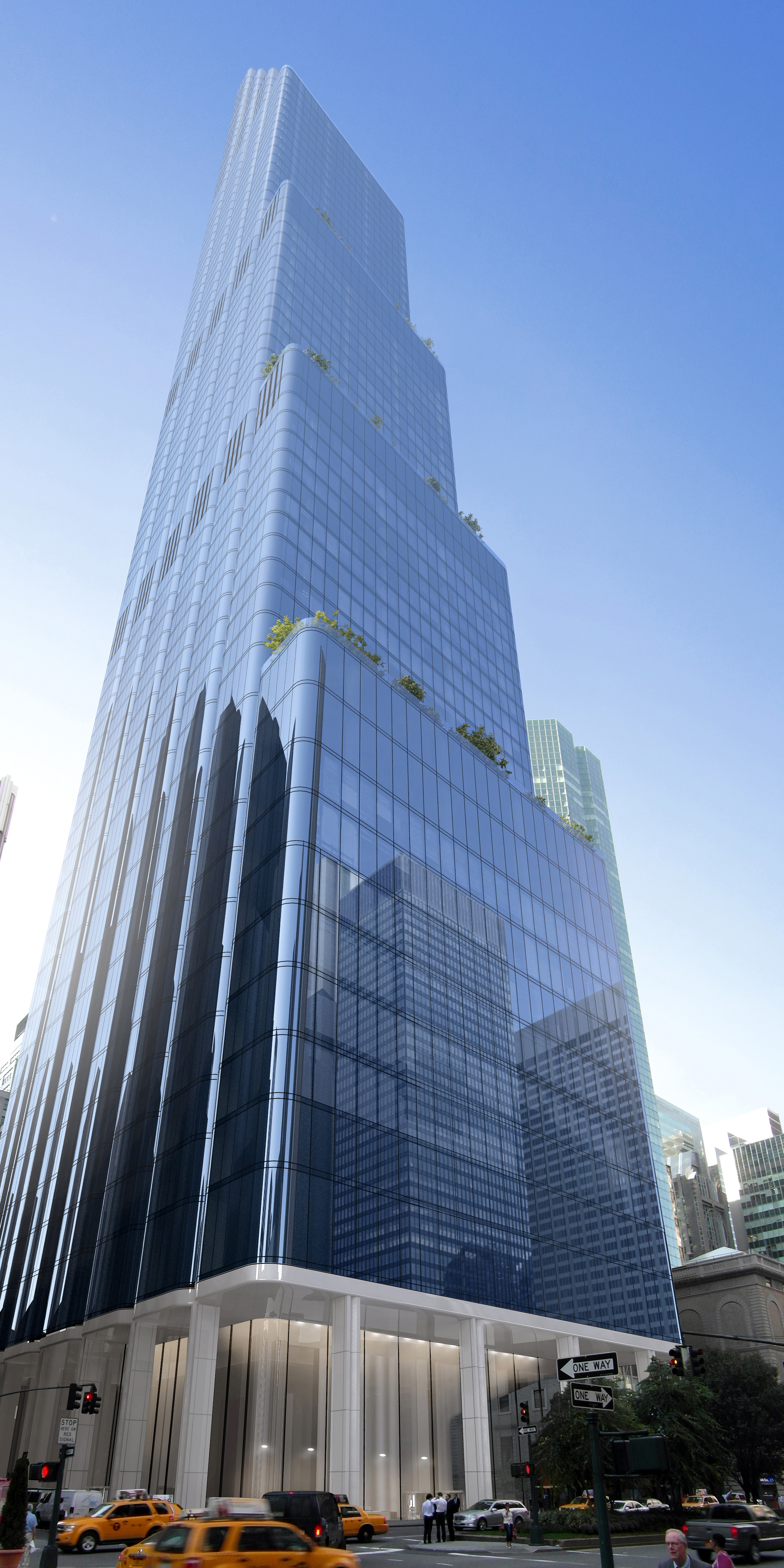
2024 design

The 2019, 2023, and 2024 proposals for 350 Park Avenue. All were designed by Foster + Partners.

== Architecture ==
The proposed supertall skyscraper is designed by Foster + Partners and consists of a stepped form rising to approximately 1,413 feet (431 m) over 62 stories, with an inwards taper on its northern and southern facades and its stepped terraces facing east over Park Avenue. The design is conceived by Foster + Partners as "a series of glass flutes", dividing the northern and southern facades into separate bays, each framed with curved glass windows. The corners of the building's layout similarly feature curved glass and are column-free, maximizing views and natural light penetration into the building.

The building's proposed 1,800,000 square feet (170,000 m^{2}) of commercial floor space is made possible in part by Citadel and Vornado's purchase of air rights from St. Patrick's Cathedral and Saint Bartholomew's Church. The tower's design includes a 12,500-square-foot open-air public concourse located along Park Avenue with office floors raised above it, providing green space, seating, and greater visibility of surrounding landmarks such as the Racquet and Tennis Club building and St Bartholomew's Episcopal Church.

== See also ==
- List of tallest buildings in New York City
- List of tallest buildings in the United States
