= Steven W. Fisher =

American judge

Steven William Fisher (May 19, 1946 – December 18, 2010) was an American attorney who served on the New York Supreme Court, Appellate Division and had presided over the trial in the Wendy's massacre while serving on New York State Supreme Court in which the defendant was the last to be assessed the death penalty.

== Early life ==
Fisher was born in Manhattan on May 19, 1946, and attended Stuyvesant High School. Encouraged by his father to pursue a career in engineering, Fisher attended Queens College, City University of New York, graduating in 1968 with a degree in physics. With the aid of a scholarship from the United States Atomic Energy Commission, he earned a degree in nuclear engineering from the University of Florida. Arriving at the conclusion that he was not set out for a career as an engineer, he enrolled at Brooklyn Law School, and recalled that "I knew I was home" from the moment that he attended his first class.

== Career ==
After graduating from law school, Fisher worked in Brooklyn for four years as an assistant district attorney before going to practice on his own at the firm of Rhodes, Baker & Fisher. Starting in 1979, he spent four years as a law clerk for Judge Milton Mollen of the Second Department. He was appointed to serve on New York City Criminal Court by Mayor Ed Koch in 1983 and was elected to New York State Supreme Court in 1993. In 2004, Governor of New York George Pataki appointed him to serve on the Appellate Division, where he served until his death.

=== People v. Taylor case ===
In the case of People v. Taylor, Fisher presided over the trial of John B. Taylor, who was charged with the first degree murder of five employees at a Wendy's restaurant in Queens that became known as the "Wendy's massacre". Fisher instructed the jury that he would most likely sentence Taylor to a sentence of 175 years in prison if the jury did not return a unanimous verdict on the death penalty.

==== Final death penalty assessment in New York ====
The jury convicted Taylor of murder and Fisher became the last New York State court judge to assess the death penalty after the New York Court of Appeals ended the imposition of capital punishment in New York in 2004, ruling in Taylor's appeal that "The death penalty statute is unconstitutional on its face, and it is not within our power to save the statute."

== Death ==
A resident of Queens, New York City, Fisher died due to cancer at his home there at the age of 64 on December 18, 2010. He was survived by his wife, Judy, as well as by a daughter Carrie, a son Daniel and three grandchildren.
