= Joseph P. DeWoody =

American businessman

- Born: Fort Worth, Texas
- Education: Southwest Christian School, Baylor University
- Occupation: Businessman
- Known for: Oil and gas president
- Website: onevalor.com/team/joseph-dewoody/

Joseph P. DeWoody is a US-based businessman, the CEO of Valor Mineral Management, and formerly president of Clear Fork Royalty, an oil and gas mineral rights and royalty acquisition company.

== Early life and education ==
DeWoody grew up in Fort Worth, Texas and attended Southwest Christian School and graduated with his bachelor's degree in Entrepreneurship from Baylor University in 2005. He earned an MBA in Finance from Baylor University in 2006.

At Baylor University, DeWoody was awarded academic all-conference honors and the 2004 Offensive Lineman of the Year award for his performance in the university football team.

== Career ==
In 2006, DeWoody joined his family's exploration and production company, Pendragon Oil, where he served as managing member. He then founded Clear Fork Royalty in 2009, an oil and gas mineral rights and royalty acquisition company through which he has acquired interests in over 250 counties in 30 states in the US.

Under DeWoody's leadership, Valor experienced rapid growth and got recognized by achieving the rank of No. 572 on the Inc. Magazine Inc. 5000 list, Top 50 Inspiring Workplaces, No. 1 Small Workplace in Fort Worth Inc.'s Best Companies to Work For, and the Fort Worth Chamber of Commerce No. 1 Small Business of the Year.

During the course of his career, the Texas governor, Rick Perry, appointed DeWoody to the Texas Board of Professional Geoscientists for a six-year term. He serves on the Boards of Directors of National Stripper Well Association and has served previously on the Boards of the Texas Alliance of Energy Producers, and the Oil information Library of Fort Worth.

After starting his career as a businessman, DeWoody has participated in multiple civic and community organizations. He is a member of the Fort Worth Stock Show Syndicate. He is also a member of Fort Worth Wildcatter's, the Botanical Research Institute of Texas, and board member of University of North Texas Health Science Center Foundation. DeWoody is a member, and formerly served on the board of directors, of the Baylor "B" Association. He was named by Maverick PAC as future 40 award winner in 2015. He was awarded D CEO Energy Services and Technology Executive of the Year, Oil and Gas Investor Magazine's 20 under 40 in Exploration and Production Award, TIPRO's Texas Top Producer Top Landman Award and also named by Fort Worth Business Press as a Forty Under Forty Award Winners.
