= Henryk Breit =

Polish philologist and journalist

- Born: 1906; Lemberg, Kingdom of Galicia and Lodomeria, Cislethania, Austria-Hungary
- Died: 1941 (aged 34–35); Stanislav, Ukrainian Soviet Socialist Republic, Soviet Union
- Education: Jan Kazimierz University

Henryk Breit (1906 – 1941) was a Polish philologist and journalist. Born in Lemberg, he graduated from the philological faculty of the Jan Kazimierz University. Soon afterwards, he received a doctorate at his alma mater and started his professional career at the colleges in Stanisławów and then the prestigious 11th State Gymnasium in Lwów.

An active member of the Society of the Enthusiasts of the History of Lwów, he was also a tour guide and a journalist, with weekly broadcasts on Lwów and the Hutsuls. He was also the author of several books on his home town and a single ethnographic documentary on the Hutsul life (no copy survived World War II). Following the German and Soviet invasion of Poland, he was arrested and murdered in the Stanislav prison, under unknown circumstances.
