= Ruding =

Ruding is a surname. Notable people with the surname include:

- Onno Ruding (born 1939), Dutch politician
- Rogers Ruding (1751–1820), English cleric, academic, and numismatist
