= Jimenez JA-22 =

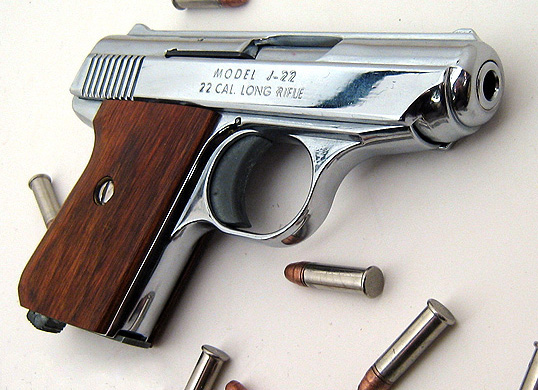
- Type: blowback semi-automatic
- Place of origin: California, United States

Production history
- Designed: 1970s
- Manufacturer: Jimenez Arms
- Produced: 1970s–present
- Variants: JA-22; JA-25

Specifications
- Mass: 12 ounces (340 g)
- Length: 4.93 inches (12.5 cm)
- Barrel length: 2.5 in (63.5 mm)
- Width: 0.5 inches (1.3 cm)
- Height: 3 inches (7.6 cm)
- Cartridge: JA-22: .22 LR; JA-25: .25 ACP
- Feed system: 6 round single stack magazine
- Sights: fixed

The Jimenez JA-22 is a .22 LR caliber pistol with a slide and frame made of Zamak, a zinc alloy. A version chambered in .25 ACP, called the JA-25, is also available. It was introduced by Jennings Firearms as the Jennings J-22 in the 1970s. Bryco Arms, Jennings' parent company, declared bankruptcy in 2003, and was subsequently purchased by the company's former foreman Paul Jimenez. After renaming the company Jimenez Arms, the J-22 and J-25 were renamed the JA-22 and JA-25 respectively.

The pistol is blowback operated and striker fired. It came with a six-round magazine. A 2001 Bureau of Alcohol, Tobacco, Firearms and Explosives publication warned that the pistol is "extremely dangerous" when dropped, with the "potential for serious injury", due to an insufficient gap between the trigger bar and the sear. The factory manual advised carrying the gun with the chamber empty.
