= Kyle DeWoody =

American gallery owner and curator

- Born: 1984 or 1985 (age 41–42); United States
- Education: Washington University in St. Louis
- Occupations: Art curator Gallerist

Kyle DeWoody is an American gallery owner and curator. She is the cofounder of Grey Area, which operates "at the intersection of art and design", an organization that promotes art exhibitions as well as the sale of art. She is the daughter of philanthropist and arts patron, Beth Rudin DeWoody, and the painter, James DeWoody. She earned a degree in art history from Washington University in St. Louis in 2007, and subsequently worked in film production, costume design, and at the Whitney Museum of American Art. DeWoody has curated a group exhibition, "Post-Psychedelic Dreams", in East Hampton. She lives in Fort Greene, Brooklyn.
