= BREIT =

Blackstone Inc. REIT

Blackstone Real Estate Investment Trust
- Type: Subsidiary
- Industry: Real estate investment trust
- Founded: 2017; 9 years ago
- Headquarters: New York City, New York, U.S.
- AUM: $100 billion (2024)
- Parent: Blackstone Inc.

Blackstone Real Estate Investment Trust (BREIT) is a REIT (real estate investment trust) launched by Blackstone Inc. in 2017.

As of 2024 it had over $100 billion in assets under management (AUM), accounting for approximately 8% of Blackstone' assets under management. It is a private (non-listed) REIT, and one of the largest REITs in the world.

Blackstone appraises the value of its assets every month; this approach has been questioned.

== History ==
In February 2022 BREIT offered to buy Preferred Apartment Communities Inc, which owned about 12,000 housing units, for $5.8 billion.

In January 2023 the company put caps on withdrawal requests after receiving over $5 billion in redemption requests.

In 2023, the University of California announced an investment of $4 billion in the trust. The investment was quickly met with backlash from tenants, unions, and faculty.

On July 28, 2025, Wesley LePatner, the CEO of BREIT, was killed along with three other victims when a gunman targeted 345 Park Avenue, apparently in an attempt to reach the National Football League headquarters in the building. Authorities stated that the shooter had no known direct connection to Blackstone, BREIT, or the victims.

In early September 2025, Katie Keenan was appointed CEO of Blackstone’s BREIT. She also is now global head of Blackstone’s Core+ real estate business.
