= JA Industries =

Former United States firearms manufacturer

- Company type: Private
- Industry: Firearms
- Founded: 1978; 48 years ago as Jennings Firearms
- Founder: Bruce Jennings
- Headquarters: Henderson, Nevada, U.S.
- Area served: United States
- Key people: Paul Jimenez
- Products: Handguns

JA Industries was an American firearms manufacturer based in Henderson, Nevada.

The company's origins trace to 1978, with the formation of Jennings Firearms. This company eventually filed bankruptcy and subsequently reorganized as Bryco Arms. Bryco filed bankruptcy in 2003 and was subsequently purchased by Paul Jimenez, who established Jimenez Arms in August 2004. Jimenez Arms filed for Chapter 7 bankruptcy in February 2020, after which its assets were transferred to a new company (also owned by Jimenez), JA Industries, which resumed operations.

All firearms manufactured by JA Industries are constructed of injection-molded Zamak, a zinc alloy.

The Bureau of Alcohol, Tobacco, Firearms and Explosives (ATF) revoked the federal firearms license (FFL) of JA Industries in April 2022. Everytown purchased all unsold Jimenez Firearms in auction upon the company's liquidation and claims to have destroyed all the firearms.

== History ==
=== Jennings Firearms ===
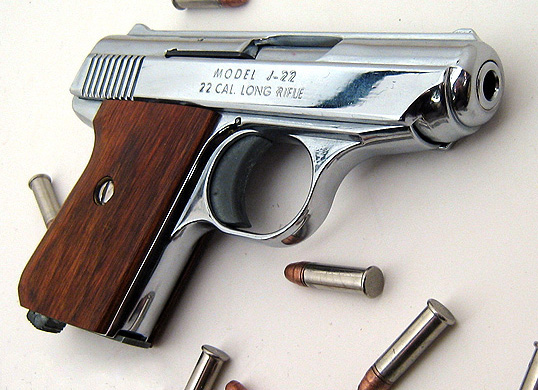
A Jennings J-22 pistol in .22LR caliber.

Jennings Firearms was founded in 1978 by Bruce Jennings, the son of Raven Arms founder George Jennings. After declaring bankruptcy, the company was renamed Bryco Arms, but the Jennings name was retained for many years even while Bryco Arms used its own brand name for firearms.

=== Bryco Arms ===
Bryco Arms was the successor company to Jennings Firearms, a U.S. firearm manufacturing company, based at various times in Carson City, Nevada, Irvine, California, and Costa Mesa, California. The company's most famous product, along with the Jennings J-22, was the Bryco Arms Model 38 semi-automatic pistol, available in both .32 ACP and .380 ACP calibers (also known as the P-38). As with Jennings, the company was owned by Bruce Jennings.

Bryco Arms was one of several manufacturers of so-called Saturday night special firearms based in the Los Angeles, California vicinity, descended from George Jennings' Raven Arms. As such, the company was named by the U.S. Bureau of Alcohol, Tobacco, and Firearms as one of the inexpensive firearm manufacturers known as the "Ring of Fire" companies. Bryco produced firearms variously branded as Jennings Firearms at its Irvine, California facility, as well as under the brand name of Bryco Arms at its former Carson City, Nevada facility, and at its Costa Mesa, California facility.

Bryco Arms declared bankruptcy in 2003 as a result of losing a lawsuit filed in Oakland, California and which resulted in a jury award of a record $24 million judgment against Bryco Arms. The lawsuit stemmed from an injury to a then 7-year-old boy named Brandon Maxfield received from a 20-year-old family friend who was attempting to unload the 380 ACP version of the Bryco Arms Model 38. The pistol discharged while the 20-year-old was attempting to clear the chamber, the gun inadvertently pointed at Maxfield. The discharge paralyzed Brandon Maxfield from the neck down. The court ruled that due to a design defect the gun had a cartridge feed problem, made evident when the safety was on and the user pulled back the slide to check the chamber or load a cartridge into the chamber. Rather than re-design the gun to correct the jamming problem, the instruction manual for the weapon was changed to require that the safety be placed in the fire position when checking the chamber or chambering a cartridge, which hid the problem from the user.

=== Jimenez Arms ===
Bryco's former factory foreman, Paul Jimenez, bought the bankrupt Bryco Arms for $510,000 in August 2004, and renamed the company Jimenez Arms. Operations resumed in Costa Mesa, California. Jimenez Arms later ceased California operations and on August 30, 2006, a license was granted for Jimenez Arms to commence operation in Henderson, Nevada, and production resumed there. Jimenez Arms declared bankruptcy amid legal issues for its business dealings with an individual later convicted of trafficking firearms.

=== JA Industries ===
In 2020 Jimenez resumed production in Henderson, Nevada under his new company name. In 2021, he came under scrutiny from the ATF due to the connections between Jimenez Arms and JA Industries.

== Lawsuit ==
Kansas City, Missouri, sued the company in 2020 for alleged trafficking. The company filed for Chapter 7 bankruptcy in February 2020.

== Products ==
- Jimenez Arms JA-22 (.22 LR), formerly the Jennings Model J-22
- Jimenez Arms JA-25 (.25 ACP), formerly the Jennings Model J-25 Auto
- Jimenez Arms JA-32 (.32 ACP), based on the JA-380 design
- Jimenez Arms JA-380 (.380 ACP), formerly the Bryco Model 38
- Jimenez Arms LC380 (.380 ACP), based on the JA-Nine design
- Jimenez Arms JA-Nine (9×19mm), also known as the JA-9
