= 55 Broad Street =

Building in Manhattan, New York

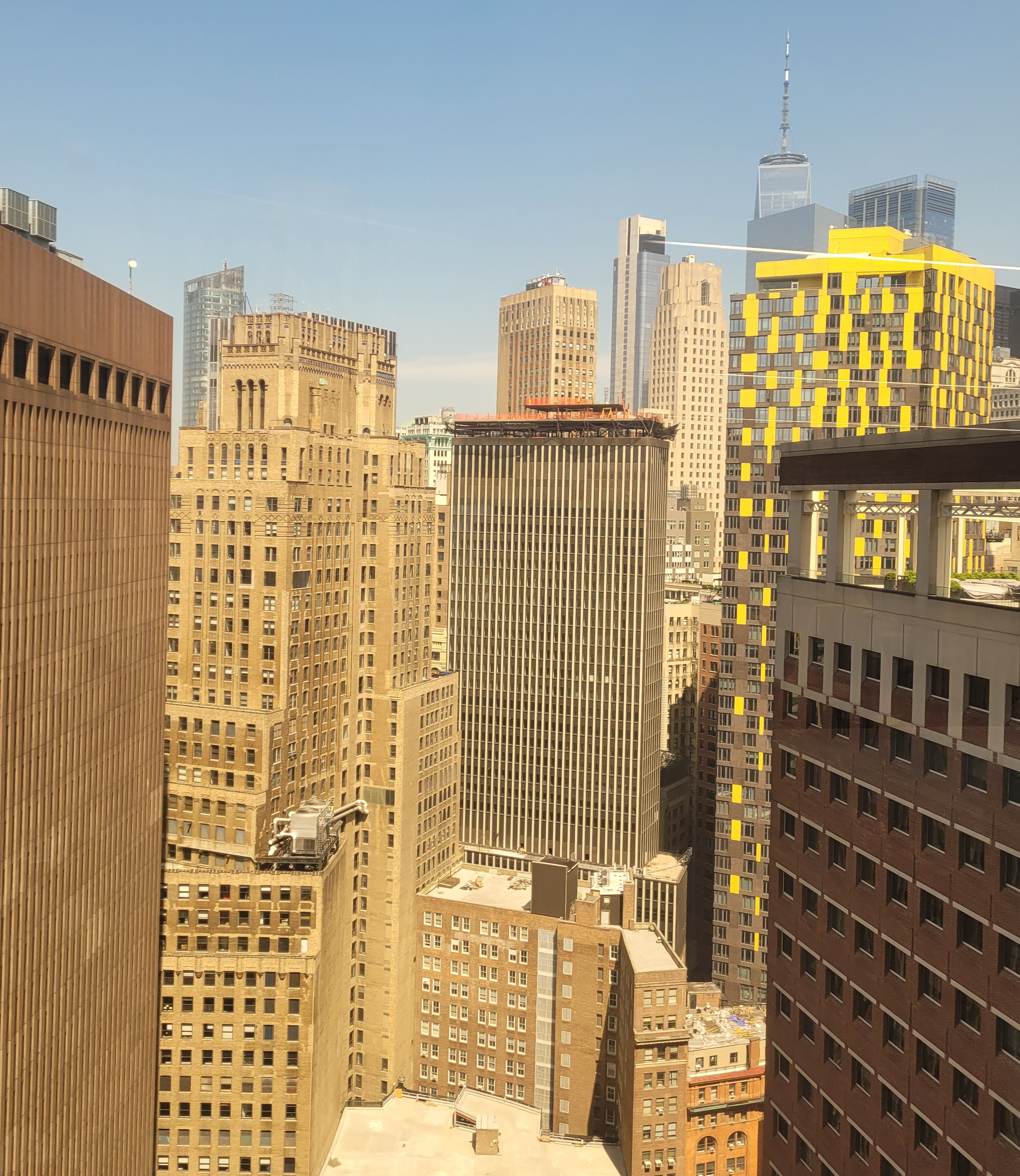
- 55 Broad Street in 2024, with construction on the top and 15 William to the right
- Interactive map of the 55 Broad Street area

General information
- Status: Upper floors closed for redevelopment
- Type: Office (1967–2023); Residential (planned)
- Location: Manhattan, New York, United States
- Coordinates: 40°42′19″N 74°00′40″W
- Completed: 1967
- Owner: Silverstein Properties and Metro Loft

Technical details
- Floor count: 30
- Floor area: Around 410,000 square feet (as of 2013)

Design and construction
- Architect: Emery Roth & Sons

55 Broad Street is a 30-story building at Broad Street and Beaver Street in the Financial District of Manhattan in New York City, New York. It adjoins 15 William, a skyscraper to the east. The building was constructed from 1964 to 1967, and initially operated as the headquarters of the trading firm Goldman Sachs from 1967 to 1983. It continued as an office building afterward, although it was vacant for renovations from 1991 to 1995. In 2023, renovations began to convert the building from commercial space into residential apartments. The project is expected to create 571 apartments and to finish in around 2025.

The building was owned by the Rudin Management Company from 1964 to 2023; the building was taken over by Silverstein Properties and Metro Loft for the redevelopment effort, although Rudin maintains a stake in the project. Ares Real Estate Group has also invested in the redevelopment venture.

== History ==
The area was previously covered by two connected 10-story buildings owned by the Areljay Company, 55 Broad Street and 45 Beaver Street. The former 55 Broad Street had been constructed in a colonnaded neo-Roman style in 1921, and 45 Beaver had been built as an annex in 1931. The main tenant of both buildings was the bank Manufacturers Hanover Trust Company, which had previously owned the buildings before selling to Areljay in 1951 and continuing as tenants. Both buildings were bought by Samuel Rudin in October 1964, who arranged for the demolition of both in order to clear the site so that the construction of the new 55 Broad Street could begin.

The new 30-story skyscraper was built by the firm Emery Roth & Sons, and was finished in 1967. Goldman Sachs, in its early growing years, was the building's tenant during its first 16 years. Goldman moved out in 1983 due to outgrowing it, going to the nearby 85 Broad Street. In 1985, investment bank Drexel Burnham Lambert (later infamous as the company at which disgraced financier Michael Milken worked) moved in as the main tenant. The firm went bust in 1990, leaving the building empty. Rudin spent around $40 million renovating the building over the next five years to remove asbestos and to add top-of-the-line for the era broadband and Internet connectivity, attracting tech companies to the building. New tenants included Sun Microsystems and a space for tech startup "incubators" run by Ernst & Young. Many of these left after the dot-com bust of 2000. The Rudin family had trouble keeping the space profitably rented in the 2010s, and came to the conclusion that the building was not viable continuing as office space. The Rudins did consider knocking down the building and building a taller replacement. However, changes in zoning rules since the 1960s would have meant having to give up space, and the cost of such a project was estimated at $600 million. The plans for the potential new building were leaked to the public in 2016, but ultimately nothing came of them.

The coronavirus pandemic in 2020 further increased commercial vacancy rates, increasing the urgency of such a project, while residential vacancy rates remained very low. The Rudins sold most of their stake to Nathan Berman of Metro Loft and Silverstein Properties with the agreement that Metro Loft would lead a residential conversion. Silverstein and Metro Loft originally intended to buy the building for $180 million in May 2022, but increasing interest rates led to the postponement of the sale. The building was finally sold in July 2023 for $173 million. The owners also took out a construction loan for the project at $220 million. The next month, CetraRuddy was hired as the project's architect. The plans called for the building to be converted into 571 apartments. Silverstein's CEO Marty Burger cited the "great floor plate, great size, great ceiling heights" as reasons for his company's decision to convert 55 Broad Street into a residential building.

The building's redevelopment is planned to be an all-electric residential building, which is not how buildings were traditionally made in New York. Environmental law changes in the 2010s and 2020s discouraged the use of gas for heating, and it also spared the redevelopment the trouble of including gas piping in the new layout. Many of the apartments are expected to be small studio apartments, aimed at recent college graduates working in the area without a family. One firm that had been renting office space as of 2023 initially sued to keep its lease, but later settled out of court and agreed to move out. The building's leasing office had opened by September 2024; at the time, tenants were planned to start moving in by that November. A lottery for the affordable apartments began in June 2025. That September, Silverstein and Metro Loft placed the building on sale for $500 million.

== Reception ==
A 2024 article in The New Yorker by D. T. Max called the building's past as an office space "an unlovable building in an unlivable neighborhood" and wrote that the architecture firm was seeking to merely maximize the amount of rentable office space in its style of construction, which the article derisively called a "stack of boxes". Lower Manhattan had very few people living in it from the 1970s to the 1990s, with the neighborhood emptying out at night as the office workers went home, elsewhere. The redevelopment is part of a trend since 2000 whereby the area has become somewhat more balanced, with more residential space and fewer office buildings.

== Gallery ==
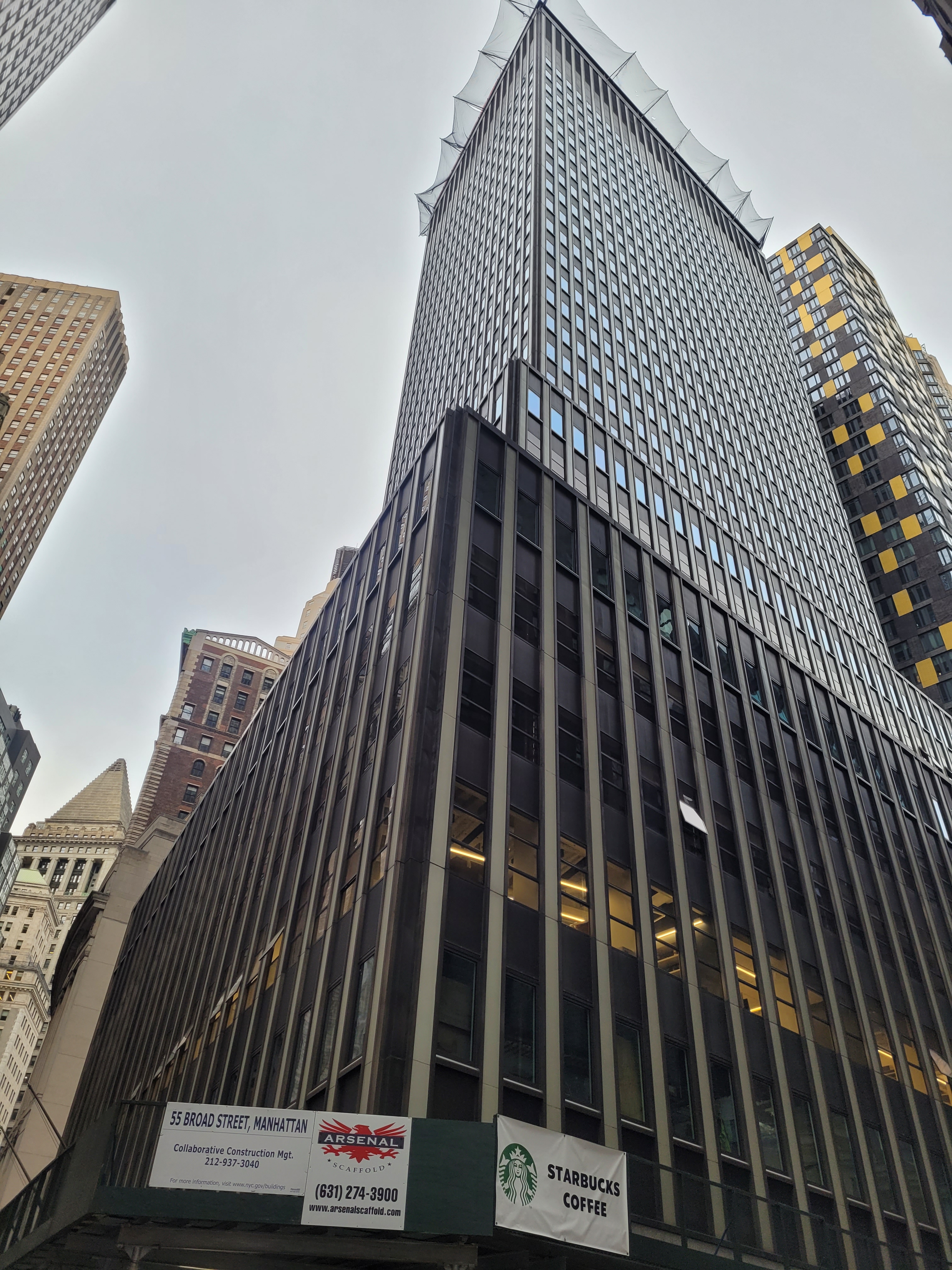
View from the intersection of Broad and Beaver Streets, looking up

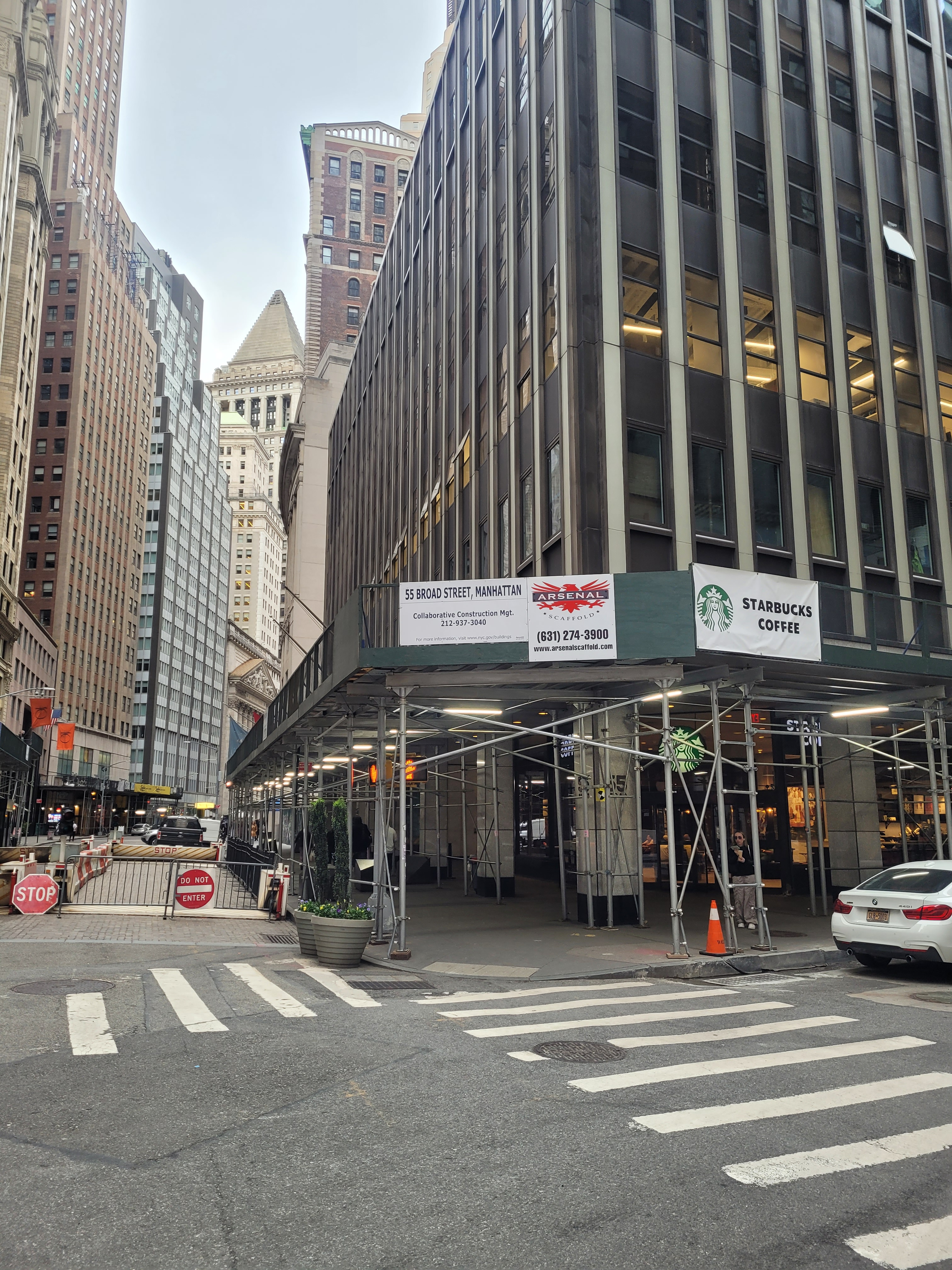
Looking north along Broad Street, street-level

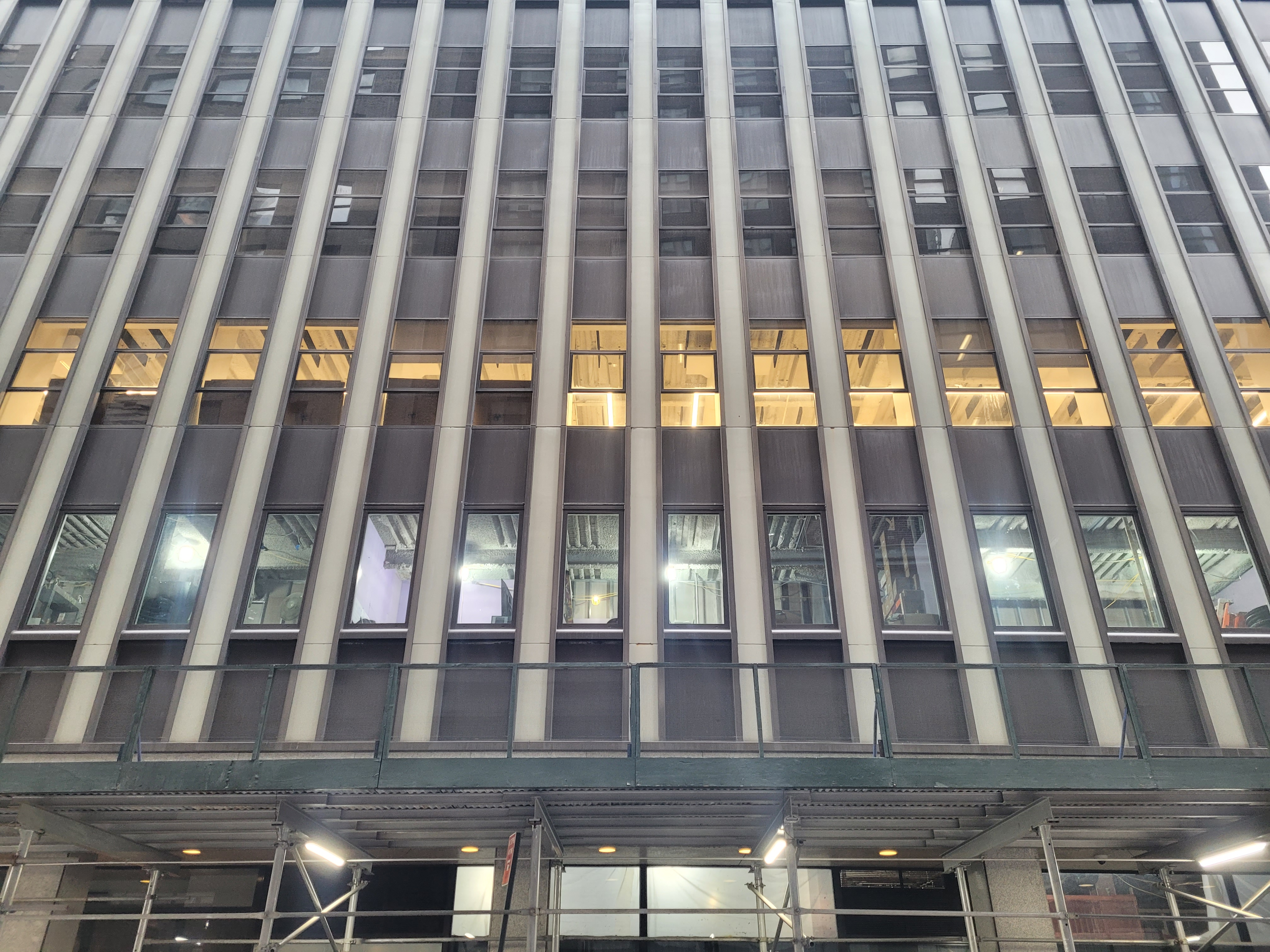
Lower floors

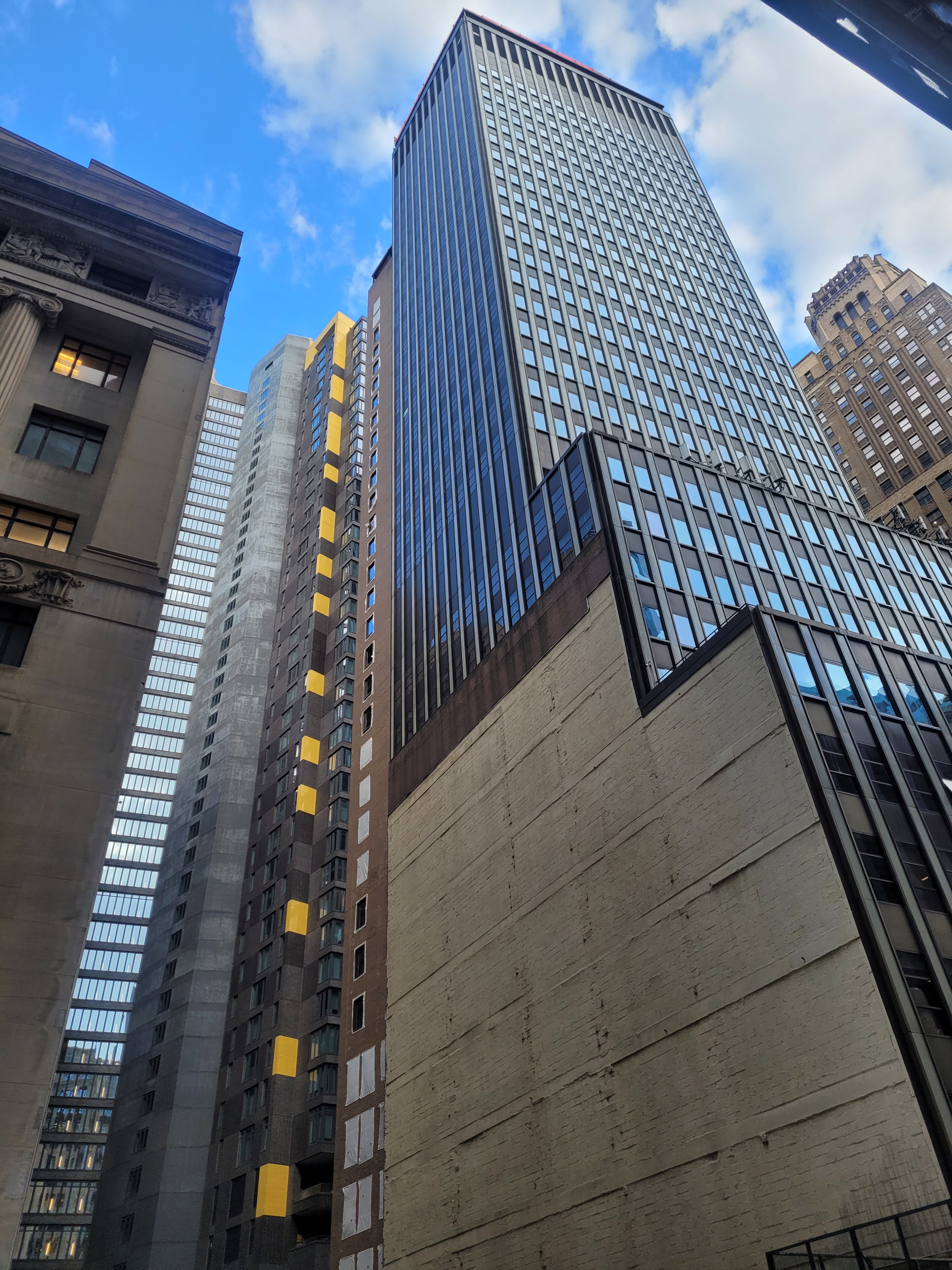
Looking south along Broad Street; setbacks of the higher floors are visible
