= Association for a Better New York =

New York real-estate advocacy group

- Abbreviation: ABNY
- Founded: 1971
- Founder: Lewis Rudin
- Tax ID no.: 13-2672366
- Headquarters: 825 Eighth Avenue, NY, NY 10019
- Location: New York City
- Affiliations: New York City Police Foundation, Real Estate Board of New York, New York City Partnership
- Website: https://abny.org/

The Association for a Better New York (ABNY) is a real-estate advocacy group in New York City founded in late 1970 by Lewis Rudin, Alton Marshall, and Rexford Thompkins to market New York as business-friendly amid concerns about crime and to lobby for policies friendly to members. It was possibly the first public-private partnership in the United States and hosts notable "power breakfasts" where ABNY members get to speak to prominent figures in business and politics who are paid to give speeches.

During the 1970s, the ABNY helped create the Big Apple and I Love New York campaigns. The group also helped create the New York City Police Foundation to privately fund police initiatives and created "Operation Interlock", a network of private security in Midtown tied into the New York City Police Department's radio system who patrolled the local streets.

== Background ==
Between 1960 and 1975, the municipal spending on welfare programs had increased. As it outpaced economic growth and tax revenue, Mayor John Lindsay implemented austerity budgets in 1968. Lindsay attempted to reform the police department and provide greater oversight but was met by the resignation of the police commissioner and senior officers in 1966. Many communities, particularly those of color, felt growing distrust of the police force and its ability to handle rising crime.

In the late 1960s, the value of NYC's bonds, credit rating, and real estate was decreasing - a trend that was worsened by increasingly negative representations of the city in mainstream media. Large firms began to move from NYC to surrounding suburbs and other parts of the country. Between 1969 and 1972, only 3 firms moved into NYC as 94 left, frequently citing worries about crime. Economist Wolfgang Quante wrote about the "bad publicity" NYC was receiving and the negative effects it was having on the city's finances.

== History ==
=== Founding and early advocacy ===
The Association for a Better New York (ABNY) was formed in late 1970 by Lewis Rudin, heir to a real-estate empire, and led by him, ABNY vice president and president of the Rockefeller Center Alton Marshall, and president of the Real Estate Board of New York Rexford Thompkins. The ABNY represented over 300 CEOs in finance, real estate, and hospitality and was funded by the individual donations of its members. Its two goals were to promote the city as business-friendly in the media and gain a greater influence for business interests in government decision making. Mayor John Lindsay supported the integration, referred to by Miriam Greenberg in 2008 as the first public-private partnership in the United States.

The ABNY began to host "power breakfasts", where prominent business and political leaders were paid thousands to give speeches to ABNY members; this allowed members to speak with the leaders privately afterward and avoided crossing campaign finance laws. From 1971-1972, the ABNY spent approximately $20,000 a week to resell it to their sponsors at $10,000 to write testimonials on companies who stayed in the city. In 1972, shortly after the founding of the association, a New York Magazine piece described it as "basically a grouping of Manhattan's biggest landlords", identifying Marshall as its "dominant influence". A report by members of the Social Services Employees Union found that the Rudin Management Corporation received the most real estate tax reductions between 1970 and 1975 and concluded there was "a connection between the Rudins' political contributions, connections, and influence and the many reductions in assessments which the politically appointed tax commissioners have granted them".

=== "Big Apple" campaign ===
In the early 1970s, the ABNY launched the "Big Apple" campaign, a collaboration between the city government and marketing and public relations CEOs in the ABNY. Rudin convinced New York's top advertising and PR agencies to aid the city at a reduced rate and give NY its first coordinated year-round marketing campaign and Big Apple brand logo, leading to a proliferation of 'Big Apple' iconography on apparel, items, and media. ABNY members held frequent Big Apple Media PR events covered by local and national news to address "grime and crime". To address grime, events included enlisting corporate employees in Midtown to sweep the streets outside their buildings and ABNY CEOs handwashing the backs of taxis at the Taxi and Limousine Commission's headquarters.

=== Crime, surveillance, and policing ===
In 1972, ABNY sponsored an advertising campaign celebrating public safety agencies, donated bulletproof vests to the NYPD, and partnered with City Hall to create the New York City Police Foundation to privately fund police initiatives. Over the next few years, the ABNY played a large role in revitalizing Times Square. In 1972, the ABNY began a program supported by police and municipal officials wherein policing in Midtown was supplemented by private security: it expanded the domain of private guards to the streets surrounding their buildings and paid for training for building staff in reporting crimes and suspicious behaviors to the police. Next year, ABNY announced it would extend its network of guards, some armed, from 50 to over 300 and expand its patrols to more streets and renamed the program "Operation Interlock" as it included a radio network connecting the guards to the police. In 1973 the ABNY funded the city's first CCTV system in Times Square. The Association also installed an antenna on the Exxon Building to link the guards in Midtown with private guards across the city to spread the network, however it remained in Midtown. By the early 1980s Operation Interlock operated non-stop and connected the private security of over 300 buildings.

The ABNY would also fund the Urban Park Rangers Program to privately supplement the City Park Department and provide "a highly visible presence" in high-profile parks for "tourists and visitors" such as Central Park, Prospect Park, and Flushing Meadow.

=== "I Love New York" campaign ===
In 1977 New York increased its tourism budget from $400,000 to $4,300,000 and hired Wells, Rich, Greene to advertise the I Love New York Campaign; the ABNY provided additional financial support and worked with the top public relationships experts in the city Bobby Zarem and Howard J. Rubenstein. The campaign became noted as the most influential in the nation and has led to worldwide parodies.

ABNY officials helped form the Business/Labor Working Group in 1979, later renamed to the New York City Partnership (NYCP), an organization chaired by David Rockefeller and made up of major financial executives who would advocate for the business and real estate sectors. The NYCP's use of VIP breakfasts was influenced by ABNY but the organization focused on discrete lobbying.

=== Later advocacy ===
During his mayoralty beginning in 1993, Giuliani coordinated with the ABNY and NYCP to pressure the city council into reducing the hotel tax, making the city more competitive with lucrative conventions in other parts of the country. Having become relatively dormant for the past two decades, following the September 11th Attacks the ABNY along with other organizations "re-branded" the World Trade Center site: some marketed the site as a space for pilgrimages while others minimized the tragedy to focus on New York's spirit.
