= Samuel Rudin =

American real estate businessman (1896–1975)

- Born: 1896
- Died: December 22, 1975 (aged 79); New York City, U.S.
- Occupation: real estate developer
- Known for: founder of Rudin Management Company
- Spouse: May Cohen (m. 1923)
- Children: Jack Rudin; Lewis Rudin
- Parent: Louis Rudinsky
- Relatives: Beth Rudin DeWoody (granddaughter)

Samuel Rudin (1896–1975) was an American real estate developer in New York City, founder of the Rudin Management Company, and patriarch of the Rudin family.

== Biography ==
Rudin was the son of Lithuanian-Jewish immigrant Louis Rudinsky, who operated a dry goods store on the Lower East Side of the Manhattan borough of New York City. His father made his first real estate purchase in 1905 when he bought a four-story brownstone on 153 East 54th Street. He commanded his sons to never sell the property and to try and purchase all the buildings surrounding it.

Samuel Rudin followed his father's edict, and he, along with his brothers, Edward, Henry, and Nathan, purchased most of the surrounding buildings. They continued to add buildings to their portfolio, and in 1925, they founded the Rudin Management Company to handle the management and leasing side of the business. In the 1950s and 1960s, the Rudin family was one of the most prolific builders of skyscrapers in Manhattan.

In 1975, his sons Jack and Lewis took over the company. In 1990, fifteen years after his death, the Rudin Management portfolio was valued at $1.5 billion.

=== Personal life and death ===
In 1923, he married May Cohen. They had two children, Jack and Lewis, who took over the family business. Rudin died on December 22, 1975 at his home in Manhattan at the age of 79. His will established the Samuel and May Rudin Foundation, which focuses on education, social and religious welfare agencies, hospitals, museums, and the performing arts, primarily in Manhattan, where most of the Rudin portfolio was located.

Rudin was an avid long-distance runner, and his family continues to be a major sponsor of the New York City Marathon; the winning athletes of the race are presented with the Samuel Rudin Trophy.
