= Lewis Rudin =

American real estate investor and developer (1927–2001)

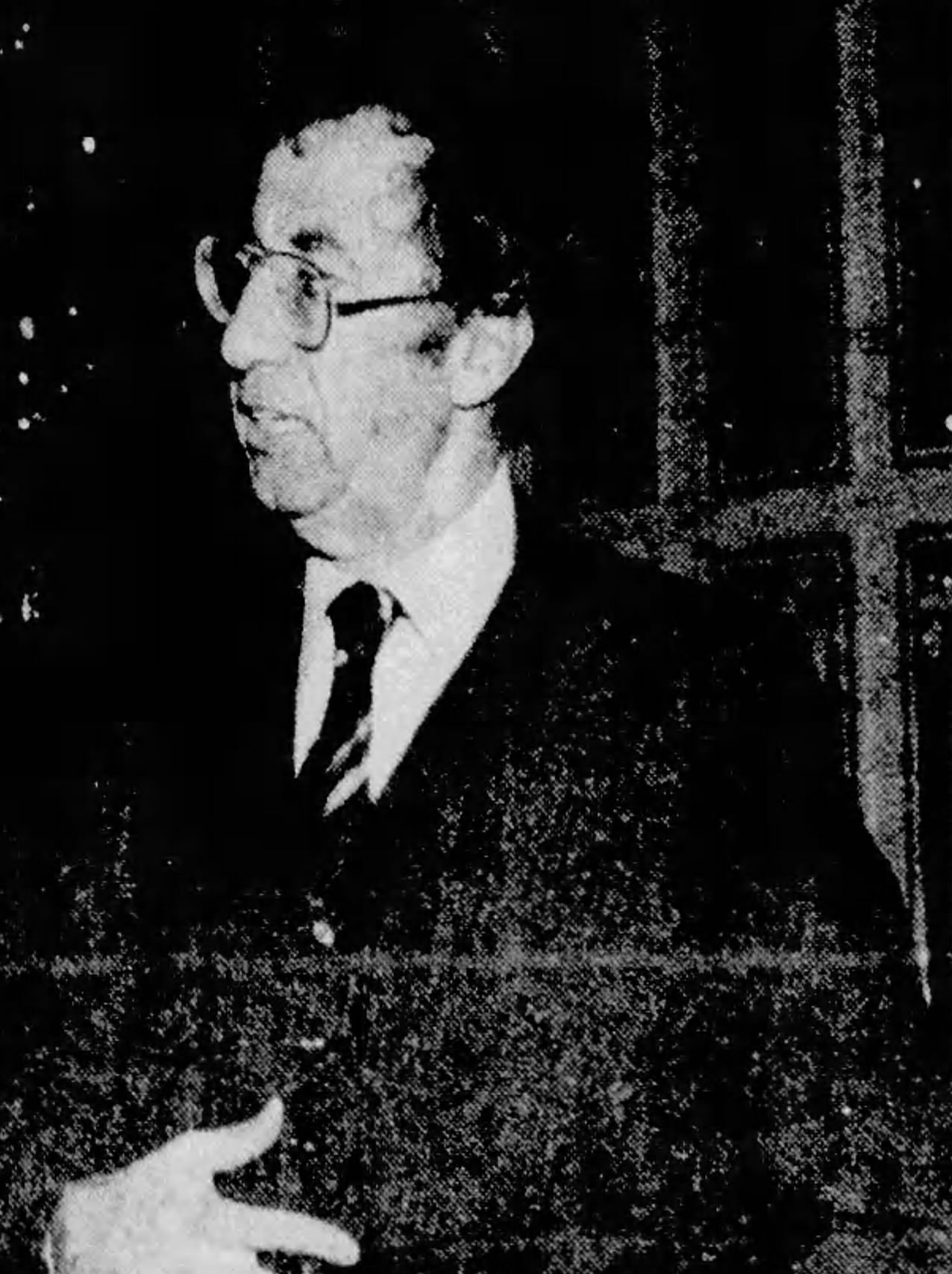
- Rudin in 1977
- Born: April 4, 1927; New York City, US
- Died: September 20, 2001 (aged 74); New York City, US
- Occupations: Real estate investor and developer
- Known for: Manhattan skyscapers Co-founding NADAP and Association for a Better New York
- Spouse(s): Gladyce Largever (divorced); Basha Szymanska (divorced); Rachel Weingarten
- Children: 2, including Beth Rudin DeWoody
- Parent(s): May Cohen; Samuel Rudin
- Family: Jack Rudin (brother)
- Awards: Bronze Medallion

Lewis Rudin (April 4, 1927 – September 20, 2001) was an American real estate investor and developer. Along with his older brother Jack Rudin, he presided over Rudin Management, a family empire of 40 buildings valued at $2 billion including more than 3,500 apartments in 22 buildings in New York City.

Rudin was a founding member of The Real Estate Roundtable, and a co-founder of both the National Association on Drug Abuse Problems (NADAP) and the Association for a Better New York (ABNY). Rudin also contributed to efforts to rescue New York City from imminent bankruptcy during the 1975 New York City fiscal crisis.

== Life and family ==
Born to a Jewish family in the Bronx to May (née Cohen) and Samuel Rudin, he graduated from DeWitt Clinton High School in 1944, and the New York University School of Commerce after serving as a sergeant in the Army during World War II. Along with his brother he joined the family real estate holding, Rudin Management Company, which had been founded by his grandfather Louis Rudinsky, a Polish-Jewish immigrant, who initially worked as a grocer before establishing the family's real estate business in the 1920s. In the 1950s and 1960s, the Rudin family was one of the most prolific builders of skyscrapers in Manhattan.

The Rudin Center for Transportation Policy & Management at the Robert F. Wagner Graduate School of Public Service is named to honor his financial gift to New York University. In 2001, New York City named a portion of East 52nd Street, Lewis Rudin Way.

== Career ==
=== Rudin Management ===
In 1975, after the death of his father, Lewis and his brother Jack took over the family company. Jack focused on construction and operations while Lewis focused on financing and marketing. In 1990, the Rudin Management portfolio was valued at $1.5 billion.

His son William and nephew Eric succeeded him running the company, as CEO and president, respectively. William C. Rudin also became chairman of the Association for a Better New York, co-founded by his father in 1971.

=== Property developments ===
Company developments include:

- 3 Times Square
- 345 Park Avenue
- 350 Park Avenue
- 55 Broad Street
- 32 Avenue of the Americas
- New York Merchandise Mart

== Personal life ==
Rudin was married three times. His first wife was Gladyce Largever. They had two children, including Beth Rudin DeWoody. His ex-wife Gladyce remarried to film executive David Begelman. His second wife was Wilhelmina model Basha Szymanska. His third wife and widow was Rachel (Weingarten) Rudin.
