= Theater District, Manhattan =

Neighborhood in New York City

Theater District
- Neighborhood
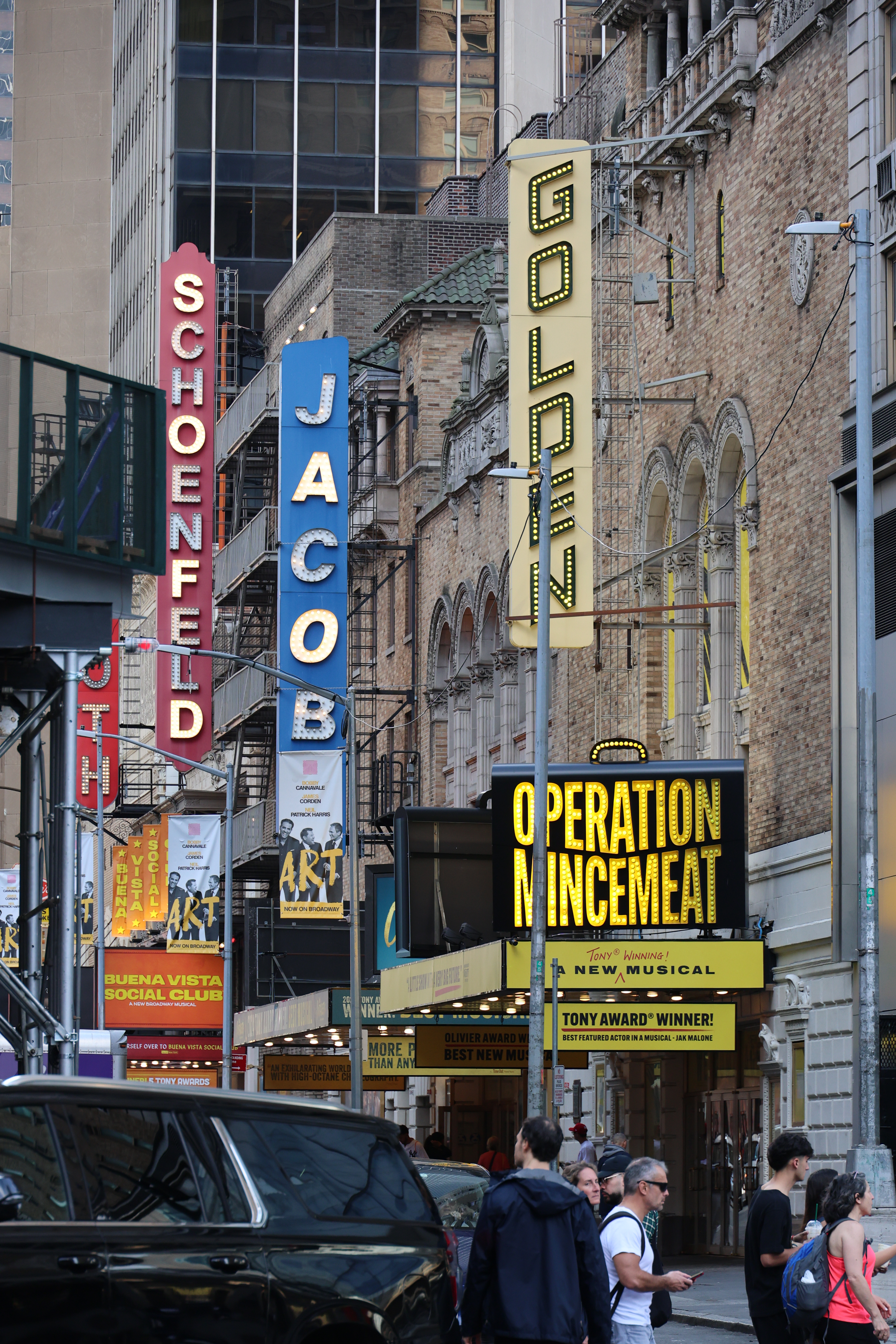
- The John Golden Theatre, Bernard B. Jacobs Theatre, Gerald Schoenfeld Theatre and Booth Theatre on West 45th Street in Manhattan's Theater District
- Location in New York City
- Coordinates: 40.759°N 73.985°W
- Country: United States
- State: New York
- City: New York
- Borough: Manhattan
- ZIP Codes: 10018, 10019, 10036
- Area codes: 212, 332, 646, and 917

The Theater District, sometimes spelled Theatre District and officially zoned as the "Theater Subdistrict", is an area and neighborhood in Midtown Manhattan where most Broadway theaters are located, in addition to other theaters, movie theaters, restaurants, hotels, and other places of entertainment. It is bounded by West 40th Street on the south, West 54th Street on the north, Sixth Avenue on the east and Eighth Avenue on the west, and includes Times Square. The Great White Way is the name given to the section of Broadway which runs through the Theater District.

It also contains recording studios, record label offices, theatrical agencies, television studios, restaurants, movie theaters, Duffy Square, Shubert Alley, the Brill Building, and Madame Tussauds New York.

== Boundaries ==
The City of New York defines the subdistrict for zoning purposes to extend from 40th Street to 57th Street and from Sixth Avenue to Eighth Avenue, with an additional area west of Eighth Avenue from 42nd Street to 45th Street. The Times Square Alliance, a business improvement district organization dedicated to improving the Theater District, defines the district as an irregularly shaped area within the bounding box of 40th Street, 6th Avenue, 53rd Street, and 9th Avenue. As of 2024, the Vivian Beaumont Theater (part of Lincoln Center) is the only Broadway-class theater not located in the Theater District.

=== Other nearby theater areas ===
The area known as Theatre Row is an area on 42nd Street from Ninth Avenue to Eleventh Avenue, which includes many off-Broadway and off-off-Broadway theaters.

== History ==
=== Origins and early history ===
In 1836, mayor Cornelius Lawrence opened 42nd Street to encourage the city's northern expansion, saying "move up town and enjoy the pure, clean air". The Theater District began attracting theaters and restaurants after the Metropolitan Opera House moved to West 39th Street and Broadway in 1883. Oscar Hammerstein I opened his Victoria Theatre on 42nd Street in 1899. Accessibility to the Theater District improved as electrified trolley lines started in 1899, followed by the opening of the New York City Subway's first line in 1904.

"The Great White Way" is a nickname for a section of Broadway in Midtown Manhattan that encompasses the Theater District. In 1880, Broadway between Union Square and Madison Square was illuminated by Brush arc lamps, making it among the first electrically lighted streets in the United States. By the 1890s, 23rd Street to 34th Street was so brightly illuminated by electrical advertising signs people began calling it "The Great White Way". As the theater district shifted uptown just before the turn of the century, the nickname stuck and became synonymous.

Over the years, the district has been referred to by New Yorkers as "the Rialto", "The Main Stem", and "Broadway". Around the turn of the 20th century, it was simply called "The Street".

By the 1970s, 42nd Street was seedy and run-down; X-rated movie houses, peep shows, and so-called grindhouses began to locate there. It was considered by some New Yorkers as a somewhat dangerous place to venture. However, in the 1990s the entire area was significantly revitalized by the city. Most of the adult theater businesses closed and an array of new theaters, multiplex movie houses, restaurants, and tourist attractions opened.

In 1974, the exterior of the Lyceum Theatre became the first Broadway theater to receive the landmark status designation from the New York City Landmarks Preservation Commission (LPC). This was followed in 1979 by the exterior and interior of the New Amsterdam Theatre.

=== Preservation ===
==== Joe Papp's "Save the Theatres" campaign ====
In early 1982, Joseph Papp, the Broadway theatrical producer, and director who had established The Public Theater, led a campaign called "Save the Theatres" in Manhattan. The primary initial goal of the "Save the Theatres" effort, which was sponsored by Papp's not-for-profit group and supported by the Actors' Equity Association union, was to save several theater buildings in the Theatre District neighborhood from their impending demolition by monied Manhattan development interests. Papp provided financial resources, campaign buttons, posters, and newspaper ads for the effort; recruited a publicist and actors to promote the cause; and provided a various stage and street venues for public events in support of the campaign for saving the historic theaters.

At Papp's behest, in July 1982, U.S. Representative Donald J. Mitchell of New York and 13 co-sponsors (Note: Co-sponsors of the Mitchell bill included: Rep. Michael D. Barnes (MD), Rep. Barber Conable (NY), Rep. Tom Daschle (SD), Rep. Arlen Erdahl (MN), Rep. David W. Evans (IN), Rep. Hamilton Fish, Jr. (NY), Rep. Thomas M. Foglietta (PA), Rep. Peter A. Peyser (NY), Rep. Peter W. Rodino (NJ), Rep. Louis Stokes (OH), Rep. Ted Weiss (NY), Rep. George C. Wortley (NY), and Rep. Ron Wyden (OR).) introduced a bill titled "A bill to designate the Broadway/Times Square Theatre District in the City of New York as a national historic site" (H.R. 6885). The proposed legislation, which was not enacted, would have required the Federal Government to aid financially and otherwise in preserving the district and its historic theater houses as an official National Historic Site.

The Save the Theatres campaign then turned their efforts toward supporting the establishment of the Theater District as a New York City historic district under the purview of the LPC. In December 1983, Save the Theatres prepared "The Broadway Theater District, a Preservation Development and Management Plan," and demanded that each theater in the district receive landmark designation. Mayor Ed Koch ultimately responded by creating a Theater Advisory Council, that included Papp as a member, and which eventually led to the area being officially zoned as the "Theater Subdistrict". Each theater's land lot could be developed with a certain maximum floor area, but many theaters used far less floor area than the maximum. The zoning plan allowed the unused development rights on the theaters' site to be sold to developers of nearby buildings that needed more than the maximum floor area.

==== Landmark status for individual theaters ====
The LPC considered protecting close to 50 "legitimate theaters" as individual city landmarks in 1982, following the destruction of the Helen Hayes and Morosco theaters. A city-landmark status would prevent the theaters from being modified without the LPC's permission, thereby protecting them from development. The landmarks under consideration included both facades and interiors, which were designated separately. Manhattan Community Board 5, under whose jurisdiction the vast majority of the theaters fell, supported many of the proposed landmark protections. An advisory panel under mayor Koch voted to allow the LPC consider theaters not only on their historical significance but also on their architectural merits. In response to objections from some of the major theatrical operators, several dozen scenic and lighting designers offered to work on the LPC for creating guidelines for potential landmarks.

The first theaters to be landmarked under the 1982 plan were the Neil Simon, Ambassador, and Virginia (August Wilson) in August 1985. The landmark plan was then deferred temporarily until some landmark guidelines were enacted; the guidelines, implemented in December 1985, allowed operators to modify theaters for productions without having to consult the LPC. The three theaters' operators objected to the landmark statuses.

Landmark designations of theaters increased significantly in 1987, starting with the Palace in mid-1987. The LPC designated the Al Hirschfeld, Belasco, Booth, and Brooks Atkinson (Lena Horne), as well as the Broadhurst, Ethel Barrymore, and Biltmore (Samuel J. Friedman) in early November 1987. This was followed by the Cort (James Earl Jones), 46th Street (Richard Rodgers), John Golden, Hayes, Hudson, Imperial, and Mark Hellinger later the same month, as well as the Embassy, which was never a Broadway venue. In December 1987, the LPC designated the Eugene O'Neill, Henry Miller's (Stephen Sondheim), Longacre, Lunt-Fontanne, Majestic, Music Box, and Plymouth (Gerald Schoenfeld) as landmarks, as well as the Lyceum's interior. These actions brought the number of current or former Broadway theaters with landmark status to 26. Five more landmarks were designated by early 1988: the Ed Sullivan, Royale (Bernard B. Jacobs), Shubert, St. James, and Winter Garden.

In March 1988, the New York City Board of Estimate approved the 28 landmark designations that had been approved in 1987 and 1988. Of these, both the interior and exterior of 19 theaters were protected, while only the interiors of seven theaters (including the Lyceum, whose exterior was already protected) and the exteriors of two theaters were approved. Several theater owners argued that the landmark designations impacted them negatively, despite Koch's outreach to theater owners. The Shuberts, the Nederlanders, and Jujamcyn collectively sued the LPC in June 1988 to overturn the landmark designations of 22 theaters on the merit that the designations severely limited the extent to which the theaters could be modified. The New York Supreme Court upheld the LPC's designations of these theaters the next year. The dispute went all the way to the Supreme Court of the United States, which upheld the designations in 1992.

=== Theater Subdistrict zoning ===
In January 2001, the New York Appellate Division, First Department in Fisher v. Giuliani, partially upheld the 1998 expansion of the Theater Subdistrict zoning regulations, which added receiving sites along Eighth Avenue where development rights from the landmarked Broadway theaters could be sold. Community and civil society organizations opposed the expansion of the district as it would impinge the nearby residential neighborhood of Hell's Kitchen/Clinton. The court objection, filed in 1999, did not challenge the pre-existing Theater Subdistrict itself or the original development rights zoning legislation.

Under the 1998 zoning regulation, New York City also created the Theater Subdistrict Council (TSC), a not-for-profit corporation. The TSC administers the Theater Subdistrict Fund and allocates grants.

The New York City Zoning Resolution for special purpose districts, as amended on April 30, 2012, contains special regulations for the Theater Subdistrict, including the transfer of development rights, incentives for the rehabilitation of existing theaters, the creation of a theater council to promote theaters, and zoning and signage for theaters, and contains a list of theaters that qualify for special provisions in the regulations.

== Points of interest ==
- Statue of Francis P. Duffy by Charles Keck (Duffy Square, Times Square)
- Statue of George M. Cohan by Georg Jo. Lober and architect Otto Langman (Duffy Square, Times Square)

== See also ==
- List of Broadway theaters
- Boston Theater District
- Buffalo Theatre District
- Playhouse Square
- Performing arts in Detroit
- Houston Theater District
- Broadway Theater District (Los Angeles)
- Theatre District, San Francisco
- Yiddish Theatre District
