= Broadway Jones =

Broadway Jones may refer to:

== People ==
- Broadway Jones (baseball player) (1898–1977), American pitcher in Major League Baseball
- Broadway Jones (performer) (1888–1948), American singer, comedian, band leader, jazz musician, and musical theatre actor

== Other ==
- Broadway Jones (film), 1917 silent film based on the play
- Broadway Jones (play), 1912 play by George M. Cohan
