= Joseph Wagstaff =

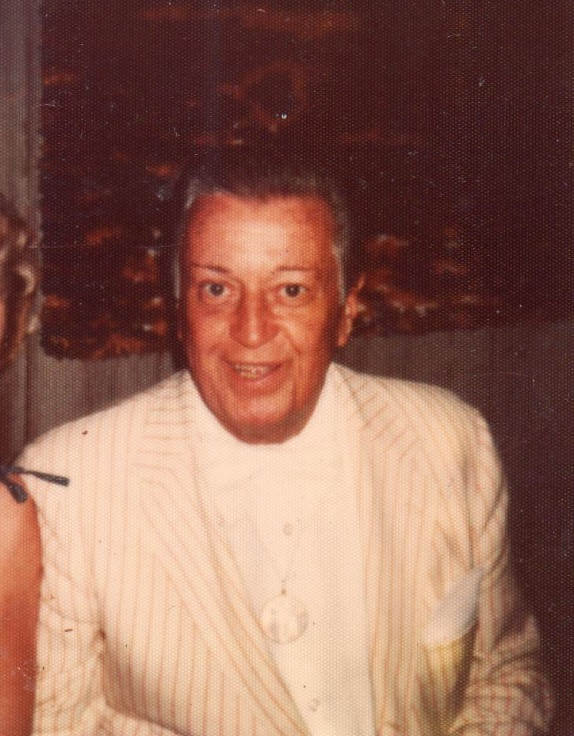
Joseph Wagstaff

Joseph Wagstaff (1903–2001) was an American actor, musician, singer, and dancer.

== Early life and career ==
His father, Spencer George Wagstaff came from Hamilton, Ontario, Canada. He went to Detroit to work as an agent for the Grand Trunk Canadian National Railway. His father died in 1925 and his obituary lists him as leaving a widow and three sons, Earl, Sumner and Joseph. The obituary lists Joseph as a musical comedy actor.

In the 1930 U.S. Census Joseph Wagstaff was listed as a silent and sound film actor.

== Broadway ==
- The Passing Show of 1923 – The play ran from June 14, 1923 until September 15, 1923 at the Winter Garden Theater in New York.
- Billie – The play ran in New York from October 1, 1928 until January 5, 1929. It was written, directed and produced by George M. Cohan. Wagstaff played the part of Jackson Jones.
- Black Diamond – The play opened in New York on June 29, 1929.
- Fine and Dandy – The musical opened on June 24, 1930 at Erlanger's Theatre in New York. Wagstaff played the part of George Ellis.

== Movies ==
A Song of Kentucky – 1929 Joe played the part of Jerry Reavis and performed the songs "A Night Of Happiness","Sitting By The Window","Rhapsody" and "Don't Blame Me". Other actors in this film were Hedda Hopper, Dorothy Burgess, Herman Bing and Bert Woodruff. There was a sound track (record) available for this film.

Let's Go Places (1930), the working title of this was "Hollywood Nights", the name was changed along the way. This is said to be a lost film. The New York Times newspaper described this as being a singing talking film. Other actors in this film were Betty Grable, Lola Lane, Frank Richardson and Walter Catlett.

== Musical performances ==
Wagstaff performed with the following orchestras and performers:

- Meyer Davis Orchestra
- Paul Whiteman Orchestra
- J.W. Sutton Club Orchestra
- Lillian Roth
- Beatrice Lillie
- Medrano and Donna
- There is a reference to Joe Wagstaff and Film Land but the sources are unclear.

== Later life ==
Joe was performing in the Detroit and Harbor Springs areas of Michigan until well into the 1990s in the summer months.
