= Gambling (film) =

1934 film by Rowland V. Lee

- Directed by: Rowland V. Lee
- Screenplay by: Garrett Graham
- Based on: Gambling by George M. Cohan
- Produced by: Harold B. Franklin
- Starring: George M. Cohan; Wynne Gibson; Dorothy Burgess; Theodore Newton; Harold Healy; Walter Gilbert
- Cinematography: Jack MacKenzie
- Production company: Fox Film Corporation
- Distributed by: Fox Film Corporation
- Release date: November 3, 1934
- Running time: 82 minutes
- Country: United States
- Language: English

Gambling is a 1934 American crime film directed by Rowland V. Lee and written by Garrett Graham. It is based on the 1929 play Gambling by George M. Cohan. The film stars George M. Cohan, Wynne Gibson, Dorothy Burgess, Theodore Newton, Harold Healy and Walter Gilbert. The film was released on November 3, 1934, by Fox Film Corporation.

== Cast ==
- George M. Cohan as Al Draper
- Wynne Gibson as Maizie Fuller
- Dorothy Burgess as Dorothy Kane
- Theodore Newton as Ray Braddock
- Harold Healy as Ben Connolly
- Walter Gilbert as Insp. Freelock
- Cora Witherspoon as Mrs. Edna Seeley
- Joseph Allen Sr. as Joe
- Percy Ames as Mr. B
- Six Spirits of Rhythm as Speciality Number
