= Mainstem =

Mainstem may refer to:

- Mainstem (hydrology) is the principal watercourse in a riverine drainage system with multiple named streams.
- Mainstem bronchus is a medical term for a part of the respiratory system.
- "The Main Stem" is another term for the Theater District, Manhattan.
