= New York Review (disambiguation) =

New York Review may refer to:

- The New York Review of Books, a semi-monthly magazine
  - New York Review Books, publishing division of the magazine
- The New York Review of Magazines
- The New York Review of Science Fiction
- New York Review (Catholic journal), a bimonthly Catholic church publication from 1905 to 1908
- New York Review (Hawks), an Episcopal church publication from 1837 to 1842
