= When You Come Back and You Will Come Back =

"When You Come Back (and You Will Come Back, There's the Whole World Waiting for You)"
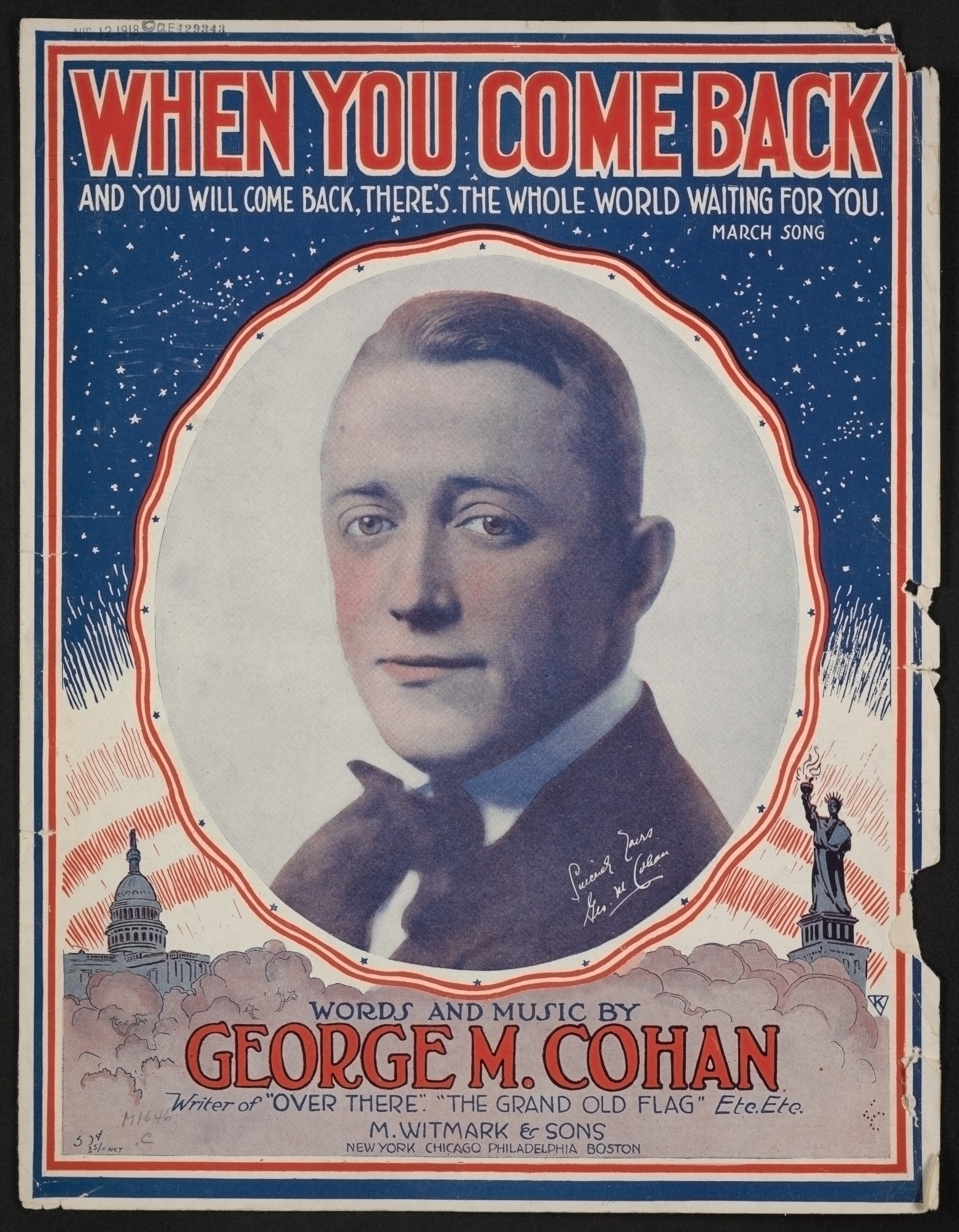

Song
- Published: 1918
- Label: Victor
- Songwriter: George M. Cohan

When You Come Back (and You Will Come Back, There's the Whole World Waiting for You) is a World War I era song written and composed by George M. Cohan and produced by M. Whitmark and Sons, New York in 1918.

== Reception ==
The song was described in The Music Trades magazine as "the biggest popular song success ever published." It reached number nine on the US Billboard charts in January 1919.

== Notable Performances ==
During an event for the campaign for the Fourth Liberty Loan at the Metropolitan Opera House in New York, John McCormack performed the song.

== Recordings ==
John McCormack recorded a version with Victor Records in 1918.

Henry Burr also recorded a version of the song.

== Lyrics ==
1st Verse:

"From Frisco Bay to Old Broadway,

Today all over the U.S.A.,

We know we're fighting the foe.

So we all stand steady and ready to go,

We know no fear, we know no tear,

And all we hear is the Yankee cheer.

I heard a girlie say

To her boy as he marched away:"

Chorus:

"When you come back, if you do come back,

You'll hear the Yankee cry, 'Atta boy, Jack!'

And when you return, remember to bring

Some little thing that you get from the King,

And drop me a line from Germany,

Do, Yankee Doodle, do!

When you come back, and you will come back,

There's the whole world waiting for you!"

2nd Verse:

It's rum, tum, tum, the fife and drum,

So march in time for the time has come

To smash right through with a bang,

With the same old spirit when liberty rand!

To win, begin to rush right in

And fly our flag over old Berlin!

Let's let our message be

To the Yankee across the sea:"

Chorus

== Awards ==
In a 1918 song contest at Proctor's Twenty-Third Street Theatre in New York, When You Come Back and You Will Come Back won the prize.
