= Billie (musical) =

Musical by George M. Cohan

Billie is a musical in two acts with music and lyrics by George M. Cohan. Cohan also wrote the book to the musical which he adapted from his earlier 1912 play Broadway Jones. It was the last musical comedy Cohan created. The musical starred Polly Walker in the title role and Joseph Wagstaff as her character's love interest.

== Plot ==
Set in New York and in Connecticut in the late 1920s, the musical is about a New York City socialite, Jackson Jones, who has squandered his fortune through his lifestyle as a playboy. Hounded by creditors, he resolves to pay his debts by marrying a wealthy widow who he does not love. Jones's path is altered after the unexpected death of his uncle who leaves Jones a chewing gum factory in his will. The factory is located in a small town in Connecticut, and Jones initially intends to sell the factory to a syndicate to pay off his debts. He is persuaded not to sell, however, after meeting the factory's secretary, a young woman named Billie. Billie passionately argues for Jones to keep the factory as the syndicate intends to purchase it with the intent of shutting it down. The pair ends up falling in love and decide to get married and run the factory together as a couple.

== Performance history ==
Billie premiered on Broadway at Erlanger's Theatre (now St. James Theatre) on October 1, 1928. It ran at that theatre for a total of 112 performances; closing on January 5, 1929. The cast was led by Polly Walker as Billie and Joseph Wagstaff as Jackson Jones. Although the plot was old-fashioned and derivative, the musical was reviewed well by the press. It was particularly praised for its choreography and dancing, which was the primary focus of the show.
