= A Song of Kentucky =

1929 film

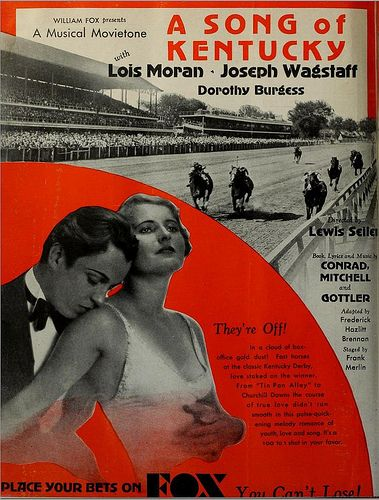
- Directed by: Lewis Seiler
- Written by: Sidney D. Mitchell (story); Archie Gottler (story); Con Conrad (story); Frederick Hazlitt Brennan (scenario & dialogue)
- Produced by: William Fox; Chandler Sprague (associate producer)
- Starring: Lois Moran; Dorothy Burgess
- Cinematography: Charles G. Clarke
- Edited by: Carl Carruth
- Distributed by: Fox Film Corporation
- Release date: November 10, 1929
- Running time: 79 minutes
- Country: United States
- Language: English

A Song of Kentucky is a 1929 American sound (All-Talking) lost Pre-Code romantic musical film produced and distributed by the Fox Film Corporation. It is an early sound film with full dialogue. It was directed by Lewis Seiler and stars Lois Moran and Dorothy Burgess.

== Cast ==
- Lois Moran as Lee Coleman
- Joseph Wagstaff as Jerry Reavis
- Dorothy Burgess as Nancy Morgan
- Douglas Gilmore as Kane Pitcairn
- Herman Bing as Jake Kleinschmidt
- Hedda Hopper as Mrs. Coleman
- Bert Woodruff as Steve

== See also ==
- List of early sound feature films (1926–1929)
