= Let's Go Places =

1930 film

- Directed by: Frank R. Strayer
- Screenplay by: William K. Wells
- Story by: Andrew Bennison
- Produced by: Fox Film Corporation
- Starring: Joseph Wagstaff; Lola Lane
- Cinematography: Conrad Wells
- Edited by: Alfred DeGaetano
- Music by: Arthur Kay
- Distributed by: Fox Film
- Release date: February 2, 1930
- Running time: 70 minutes
- Country: United States
- Language: English

Let's Go Places is a 1930 American Pre-Code musical film made by the Fox Film Corporation.

Directed by Frank R. Strayer, the film uses a screenplay by William K. Wells which is based on a story by Andrew Bennison. It was choreographed by Danny Dare. The film stars Joseph Wagstaff, Lola Lane, Sharon Lynn, Frank Richardson, Walter Catlett, Dixie Lee, Ilka Chase, and Larry Steers.

== Cast ==
- Joseph Wagstaff as Paul Adams
- Lola Lane as Marjorie Lorraine
- Sharon Lynn as Virginia Gordon
- Frank Richardson as J. Speed Quinn
- Walter Catlett as Rex Wardell
- Dixie Lee as Dixie
- Ilka Chase as Mrs. Du Bonnet
- Larry Steers as Ben King

unbilled

- Betty Grable as Chorine
- Charles Judels as Du Bonnet
- Eddie Kane as Frenchman

== Preservation status ==
According to IMDb, Let's Go Places is now considered a lost film.

== See also ==
- List of lost films
