= Broadway Jones (play) =

Play by George M. Cohan

Broadway Jones is a play by George M. Cohan. The comedy was staged on Broadway in 1912–1913, and in London's West End in 1916. It was adapted into a silent film in 1917 and was later adapted by Cohan into the musical Billie, which premiered on Broadway in 1928.

== Plot ==
Socialite Jackson "Broadway" Jones was born wealthy but has squandered his money through his life as an irresponsible playboy. Now indebted to creditors, he attempts to solve his financial problems by becoming engaged to an older but wealthy widow, Mrs. Girard, whom he does not love. Jones's path is altered after the unexpected death of his grandfather, who leaves Broadway a chewing gum factory in his will. Broadway travels to the factory in Jonestown, Ohio, intending to selling the factory to a chewing gum conglomerate to raise money to pay off his debts. He soon meets the factory's secretary, Josie Richards, who pleads with him not to sell the factory, as its prospective buyers plan to shut the factory after the sale. Broadway falls in love with Josie, and ultimately the play ends with the couple planning to get married and running the factory together as a couple.

== Performance history ==
Broadway Jones premiered on September 16, 1912, at Parsons Theatre in Hartford, Connecticut. It then moved to Broadway, where it opened at George M. Cohan's Theatre on September 23, 1912, co-produced by Cohan and Sam H. Harris. It ran there for 176 performances, closing in February 1913. The Broadway cast was led by Cohan in the title role, with his mother. Helen Cohan, as Mrs. Spotswood, and his father, Jerry J. Cohan, as Judge Spotswood. Others in the cast included Myrtle Tannehill as Josie Richards, Russell Pincus as Sam Spotswood, M. J. Sullivan as Rankin, Ada Gilman as Mrs. Girard, and George Parsons as Robert Wallace.

After the Broadway run, Cohan toured in the play and ultimately brought the work to London's West End where it opened at the Prince of Wales Theatre on September 6, 1916. It ran there for 116 performances and closed on November 25, 1916.

== Adaptations ==
Broadway Jones was adapted into a 1917 silent film that also starred Cohan. Cohan later adapted the play into the musical Billie, which premiered on Broadway in 1928.
