= Francis P. Duffy =

Roman Catholic priest and United States Army officer

The Reverend Francis P. Duffy
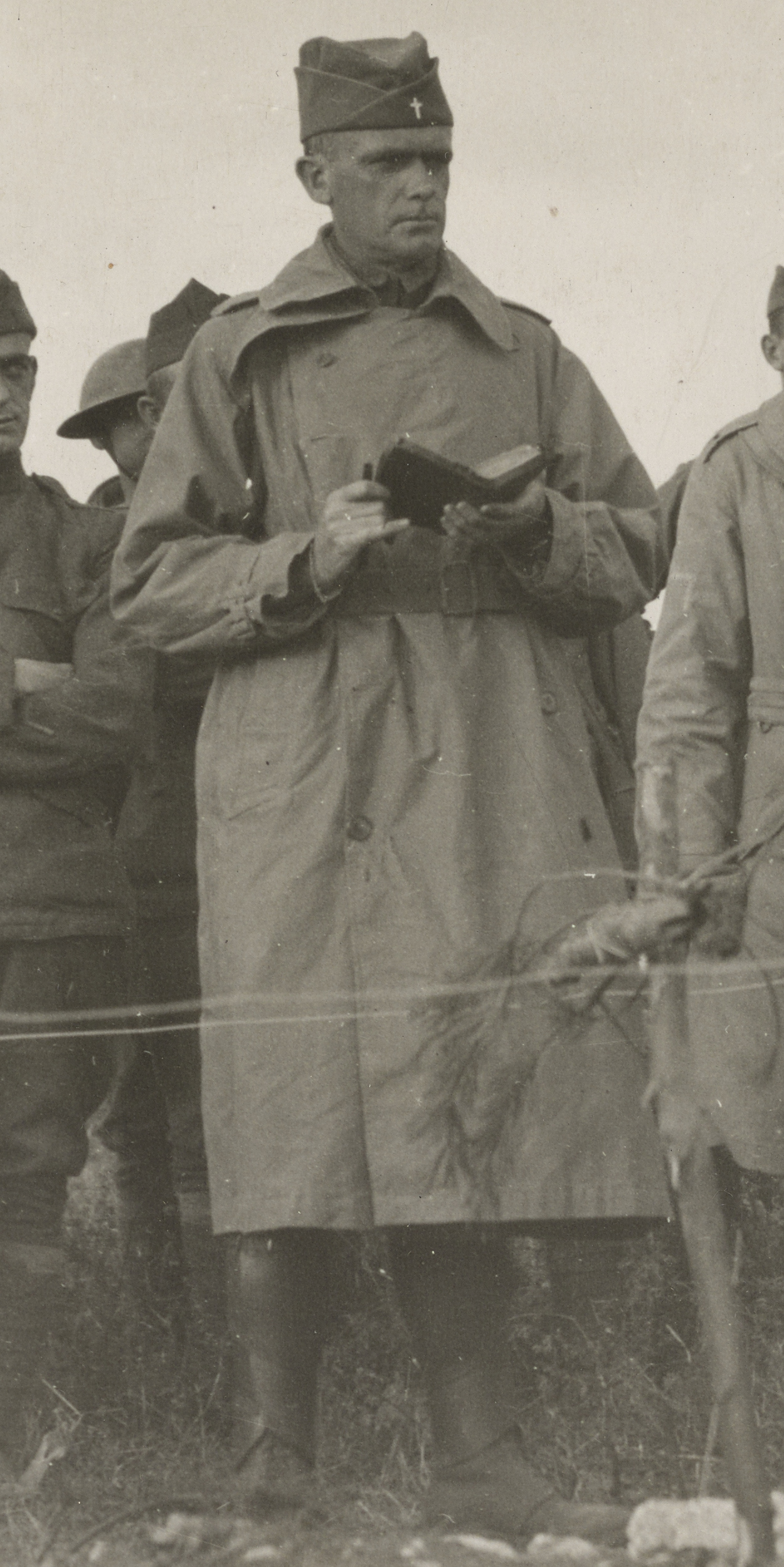
- Duffy in 1918
- Born: May 2, 1871; Cobourg, Ontario, Canada
- Died: June 26, 1932 (aged 61); New York City, New York, U.S.
- Occupations: Soldier, priest

Francis Patrick Duffy (May 2, 1871 – June 26, 1932) was a Canadian American soldier, Catholic priest and military chaplain.

Duffy served as chaplain for the 69th Infantry Regiment (known as the "Fighting 69th"), a unit of the New York Army National Guard largely drawn from the city's Irish-American population. He served in the Spanish–American War (1898), but it is his service on the Western Front in France during World War I (1917–1918) for which he is best known. Duffy, who typically was involved in combat and accompanied litter bearers into the thick of battle to recover wounded soldiers, became the most highly decorated cleric in the history of the United States Army.

Duffy Square – the northern half of New York City's Times Square between 45th and 47th Streets – is named in his honor.

== Biography ==
=== Early life and career ===
Francis Duffy was born May 2, 1871, in Cobourg, Ontario, Canada, the son of Patrick and Mary Ready Duffy, and attended St. Michael's College in Toronto and St. Joseph's Seminary, Troy, New York. He taught for a time at the College of St. Francis Xavier, and was awarded a master's degree. He became a priest of the Archdiocese of New York, being ordained on September 6, 1896. He attended The Catholic University of America where he earned a doctorate in 1905.

After ordination, Duffy served on the faculty of St. Joseph's Seminary, Dunwoodie, Yonkers, which trains priests for the Archdiocese of New York. He was professor of Philosophical Psychology – a course more related to the Philosophy of the Human Person than to Clinical Psychology, in today's terms – and functioned as a mentor to numerous students. He was also editor of the New York Review, at the time the most scholarly and progressive Catholic theological publication in the United States, and contributed the article on "Abstraction" to the Catholic Encyclopedia. Extremely popular with students, Duffy was part of a group of faculty members who introduced ground-breaking innovations into the seminary curriculum, putting the institution in the forefront of clerical education.

When authors in the New York Review fell under suspicion of the heresy of modernism, contributing members of the faculty were reassigned to other work. The New York Review itself never published an article that was suspect, but it did print papers by leading Catholic Biblical experts who were part of the newly emerging schools of Biblical criticism, and several of these authors' other works raised eyebrows in Rome. Duffy himself wrote few signed items in the journal, although he did author parts of it, and he was responsible as editor for the entire publication.

Duffy's new assignment was creating the parish of Our Savior Church in the Bronx. There, in 1912, he organized the parish and built a physical structure that combined parish school and church, one of several innovations he introduced.

During this period, Duffy was active in both the Catholic Summer School, a sort of adult summer camp and continuing education system that foreshadowed the explosion in Catholic higher education for the laity today, and in the military – he was regimental chaplain to the 69th New York, which was federalized for a time during the Spanish–American War.

=== Service as an Army chaplain ===
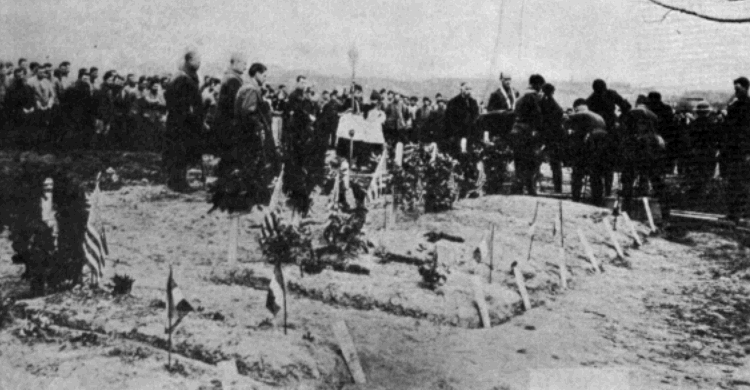
Father Francis Duffy, Regimental Chaplain of the 165th Infantry Regiment, the Army's famous "Fighting 69th" Irish regiment, officiates a funeral service for a Soldier of the 117th Field Signal Battalion of the 42nd Infantry "Rainbow Division" March 1918

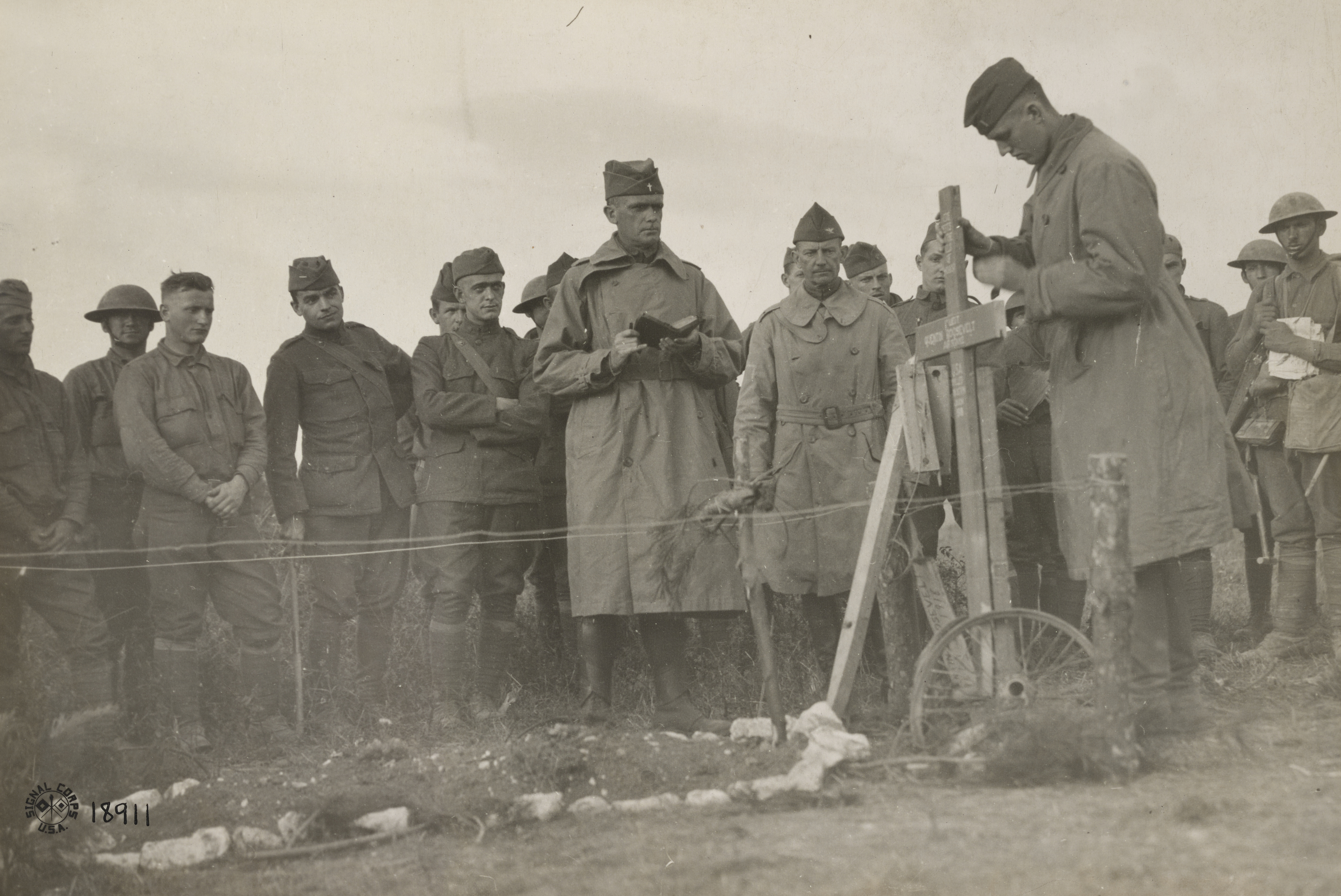
Chaplain Duffy conducts a funeral service over the grave of First Lieutenant Quentin Roosevelt, brought down by the Germans on July 14, 1918.

Already well known in theological circles, Duffy gained wider fame for his involvement as a military chaplain during World War I, when the 69th New York ("The Fighting 69th") was federalized again and redesignated the 165th U.S. Infantry Regiment. When the unit moved up to the front in France, Duffy accompanied the litter bearers in recovering the wounded and was frequently seen in the thick of battle. Recognized by the regimental commander, Lieutenant Colonel William "Wild Bill" Donovan – who would go on to found the OSS in World War II – as a key element in the unit's morale, Duffy's role in the unit went beyond that of a normal cleric: the regiment was composed primarily of first- and second-generation Irish immigrants from New York City, many of whom wrote later about Duffy's leadership. Brigadier General Douglas MacArthur stated later that Duffy was briefly considered for the post of regimental commander.

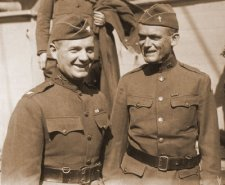
Father Duffy (right) with Colonel Donovan upon their return from France, 1919.

For tirelessly and unceasingly caring for the wounded and dying men in the village of Villers-sur-Fere, France, from July 28-31 1918, Chaplain Duffy was awarded the Distinguished Service Cross, the citation for which reads:

The President of the United States of America, authorized by Act of Congress, July 9, 1918, takes pleasure in presenting the Distinguished Service Cross to First Lieutenant (Chaplain) Francis Patrick Duffy, United States Army, for extraordinary heroism in action while serving as Chaplain with 165th Infantry Regiment, 42d Division, A.E.F., in the village of Villers-sur-Fere, France, from 28 to 31 July 1918. Chaplain Duffy devoted himself tirelessly and unceasingly to the care of the wounded and dying. Despite a constant and severe bombardment with shells and aerial bombs, he continued to circulate in and about two aid stations and the hospitals, creating an atmosphere of cheerfulness and confidence by his courageous and inspiring example.

He was also awarded the Army Distinguished Service Medal, the Conspicuous Service Cross (New York State), the Légion d'Honneur (France), and the Croix de Guerre. Father Duffy is the most highly decorated cleric in the history of the U.S. Army. The citation for his Army DSM reads:

The President of the United States of America, authorized by Act of Congress, July 9, 1918, takes pleasure in presenting the Army Distinguished Service Medal to Captain (Chaplain) Francis Patrick Duffy, United States Army, for exceptionally meritorious and distinguished services to the Government of the United States, in a duty of great responsibility during World War I. Chaplain Duffy performed with distinction his combined duties as Regimental and Division Chaplain, stimulating the work of all with whom he came in contact. When his division was in rest areas, he was tireless and devoted in his efforts to help all with whom he served. Whether in the front-line trenches or in an attack, he was with the troops, encouraging them to greater effort, an example of fearlessness and devotion to duty, helping to care for the sick and wounded, administering to the dying, and arranging for the burial of the dead.

Following the war he wrote Father Duffy's Story, which grew out of a manuscript originally started by Joyce Kilmer, the poet and convert to Catholicism who had joined the regiment and had become a close friend to Duffy. When Kilmer was killed in France, he was working on a history of the regiment's involvement in the war, which Duffy intended to continue, but Duffy was prevailed upon to include his own reminiscences.

=== Holy Cross Church ===
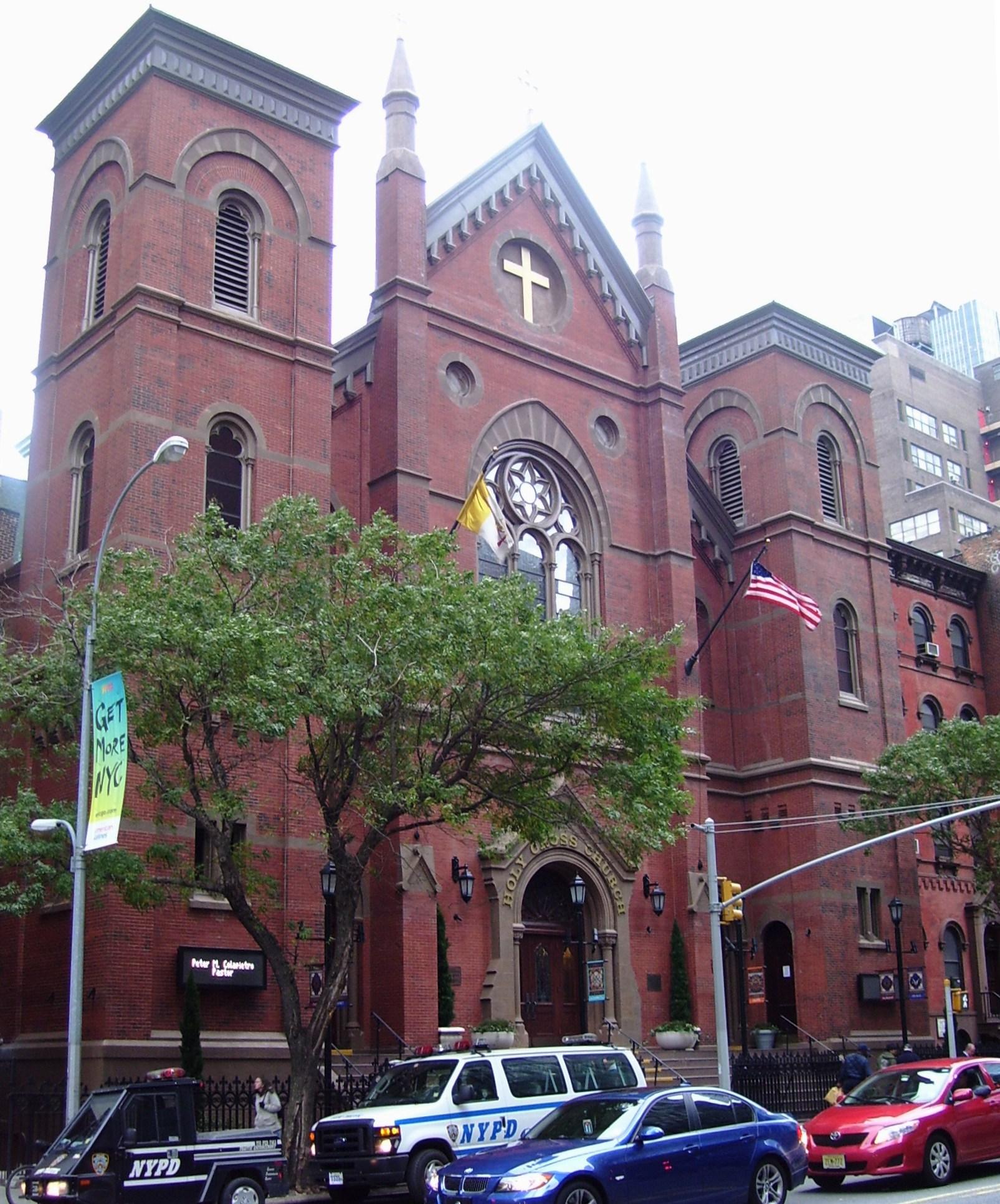
Holy Cross Church on 42nd Street in Manhattan, New York City.

Duffy then served as a pastor of Holy Cross Church in Hell's Kitchen, a block from Times Square, until his death. While there, he had one last opportunity to make a contribution to Catholic thought: in 1927, during Al Smith's campaign for president, the Atlantic Monthly published a letter by Charles C. Marshall, a Protestant lawyer, which questioned whether a Catholic could serve as a loyal president who would put the nation and the Constitution before his allegiance to the Pope, a common thread in American anti-Catholicism. Smith was given a chance to reply: his article, which was ghost-written by Duffy, was a classic statement of the intellectual ideas behind American Catholic patriotism. It hinted at notions of religious freedom and freedom of conscience which would not be spelled out by the Church itself until the Second Vatican Council's Declaration on Religious Freedom in the 1960s.

=== Death ===
Duffy died on June 26, 1932, in New York City.

Beloved Chaplain of Fighting 69th Dies. New York, June 27 – The spirit of Father Francis Patrick Duffy, beloved chaplain of the 'Fighting Sixty-Ninth' of the wartime Rainbow Division, has rejoined the thousands of men who died on the battlefields of France where he served them. The present colonel of his old regiment was at the bedside until near the end. Others through the nation and especially in New York, home of the old Sixty-Ninth, known in war days as the 165th Infantry, mourned the chaplain who died at the age of 62. Father Duffy will have a military burial. The old Sixty-Ninth will attend the services of America's wars, Msgr. John P. Chidwick, chaplain of the Battleship Maine when it was blown up in Havana Harbor, will preach the funeral sermon. Death came to Father Duffy early yesterday after an illness of three months from an intestinal infection. Hundreds of friends of all faiths had flooded the mails with letters of concern and hope for his recovery. The Irish chaplain of an Irish regiment won fame and decorations from his own and the French governments for his devotion to his men under fire during the World War. His death led General Douglas MacArthur, chief of staff in Washington and war-time commander of the Rainbow (42nd) Division, to reveal he had recommended the priest for command of the 165th Regiment at one time when the division was in the midst of an offensive.

== Legacy ==
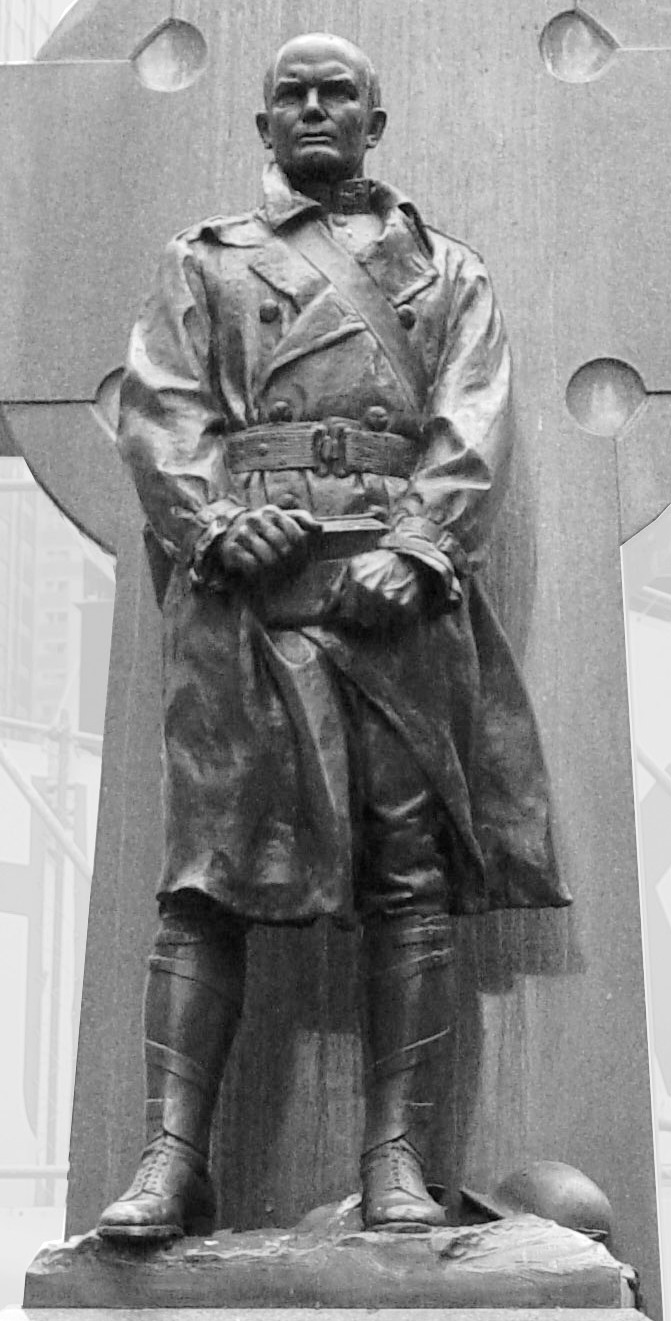
Monument in Duffy Square in northern triangle of Times Square, New York City

Father Duffy is commemorated by Duffy Square, which is located in the northern triangle of Times Square between 45th and 47th Streets in Manhattan, New York City. A statue, which is located in front of the steps of the TKTS booth, portrays Duffy standing in front of a Celtic cross.

He is further commemorated as the namesake to the Chaplain Duffy Spiritual Fitness Center at Camp Smith, a New York Army National Guard installation in Cortlandt Manor, New York.

In the 1940 movie The Fighting 69th, Father Duffy is portrayed by Pat O'Brien.

== See also ==
- Roman Catholic Archdiocese for the Military Services, USA#World War I
