= Statue of George M. Cohan =

Statue in Times Square, Manhattan, New York, U.S.

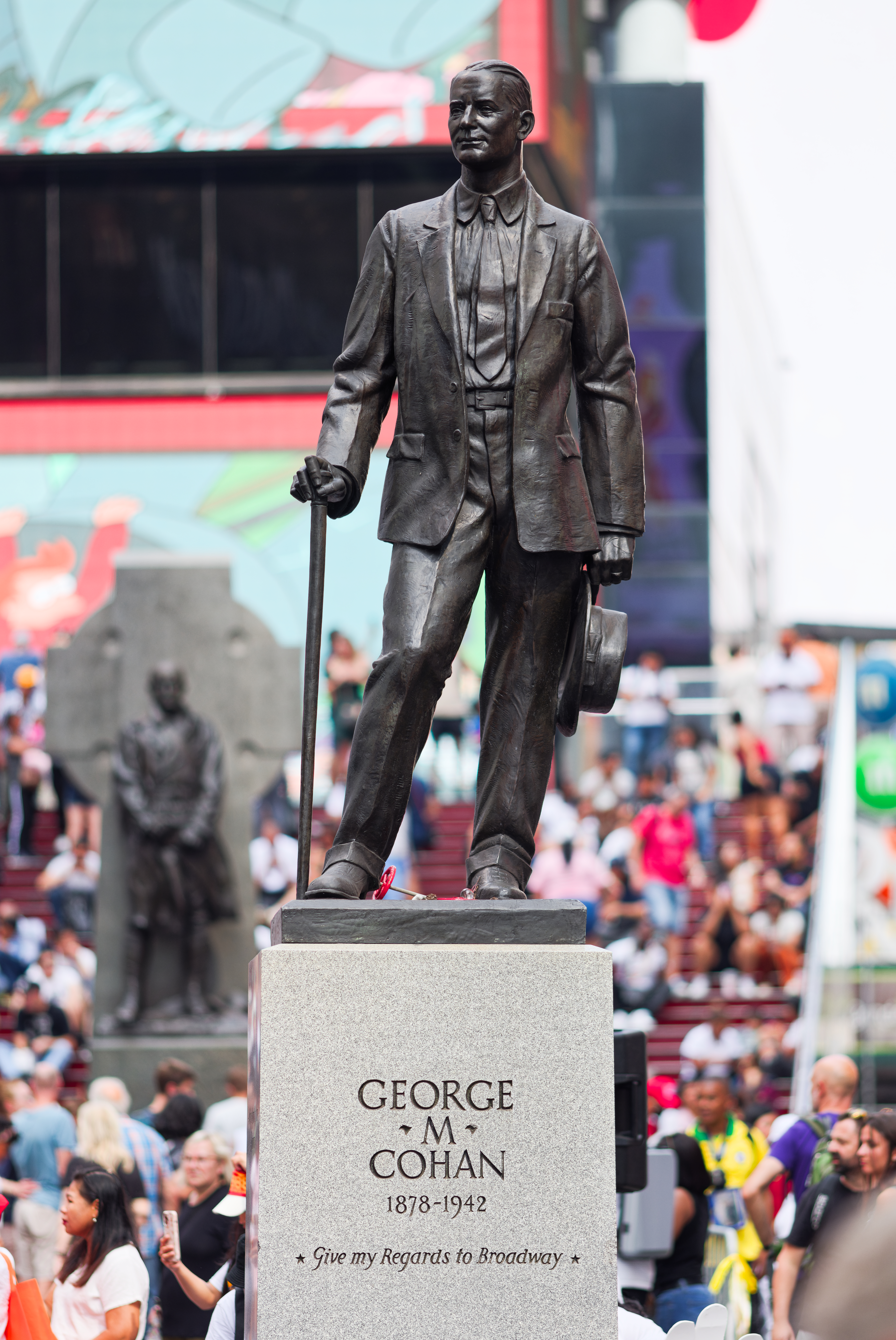
- The statue in 2023
- Artist: Georg J. Lober
- Year: 1959
- Medium: Bronze sculpture
- Location: New York City, New York; 40°45′31.53″N 73°59′6.52″W

A bronze sculpture of composer George M. Cohan by artist Georg John Lober and architect Otto Langman is installed at Duffy Square, part of Times Square, in the New York City borough of Manhattan.

Cast in 1959 and dedicated on September 11, 1959, the statue rests on a light Barre granite pedestal, which is set on a dark Barre granite base.

== See also ==
- 1959 in art
