= Duffy Square =

- Father Francis P. Duffy Statue and Duffy Square
- U.S. National Register of Historic Places
- New York State Register of Historic Places
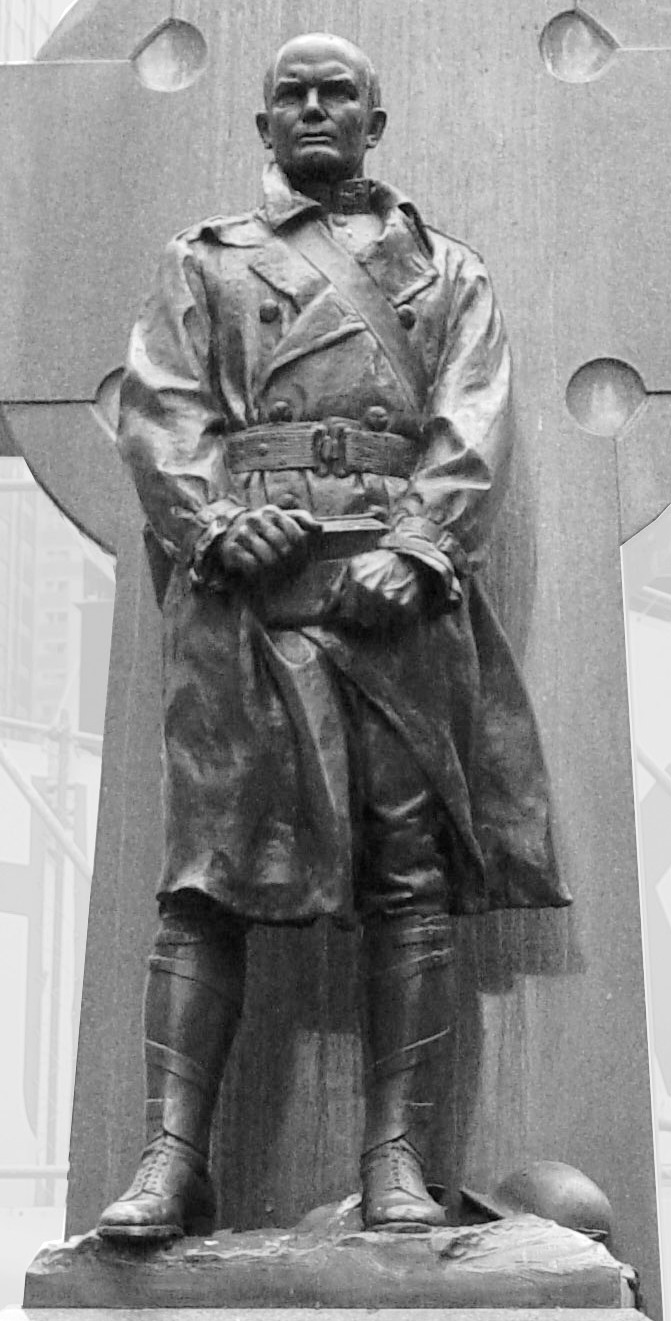
- Statue of Francis P. Duffy

- Location within New York City Location within New York Location within the United States
- Location: Triangle bounded by Broadway, Seventh Ave., W. 45th and W. 47th Streets, New York, New York
- Coordinates: 40°45′32″N 73°59′7″W
- Built: 1937
- Architect: Charles Keck
- Architectural style: Classical Revival
- NRHP reference No.: 01000243
- NYSRHP No.: 06101.011582

Significant dates
- Added to NRHP: March 12, 2001
- Designated NYSRHP: December 8, 2000

Duffy Square, officially named Father Duffy Square in 1939, is the northern triangle of Times Square in Manhattan, New York City. It is bounded by 45th and 47th Streets, Broadway and Seventh Avenue. It is now well known for the TKTS reduced-price theater tickets booth located there.

In the 18th and 19th centuries Lowes Lane connected Bloomingdale Road to Eastern Post Road. The west end of the lane was at the modern Duffy Square, and the east end at approximately the modern Third Avenue and 42nd Street. Lowes Lane and Eastern Post Road were suppressed late in the 19th century with the introduction Manhattan's grid street pattern, but Bloomingdale Road survives under the name of Broadway.

Duffy Square was briefly dominated by a fifty-foot, eight-ton plaster statue entitled Purity (Defeat of Slander) by Leo Lentelli in 1909. Now the square has two statues: a bronze statue of Chaplain Francis P. Duffy of New York's "Fighting 69th" Infantry Regiment, after whom the square is named, sculpted by Charles Keck, and another statue depicting composer, playwright, producer and actor George M. Cohan, by sculptor Georg J. Lober. The statue of Duffy was dedicated by Mayor Fiorello LaGuardia on May 2, 1937, who also signed the law authorizing the renaming of the square to "Father Duffy Square" on March 29, 1939; on June 13 of that year, the street signs were changed. The statue of Duffy and the square itself were listed on the National Register of Historic Places in 2001.

== Gallery ==
Duffy Square in 1905 (Times Square), Broadway (left side), 7th Ave (right side) facing North. The Budweiser billboard is now TKTS Booth in Times Square

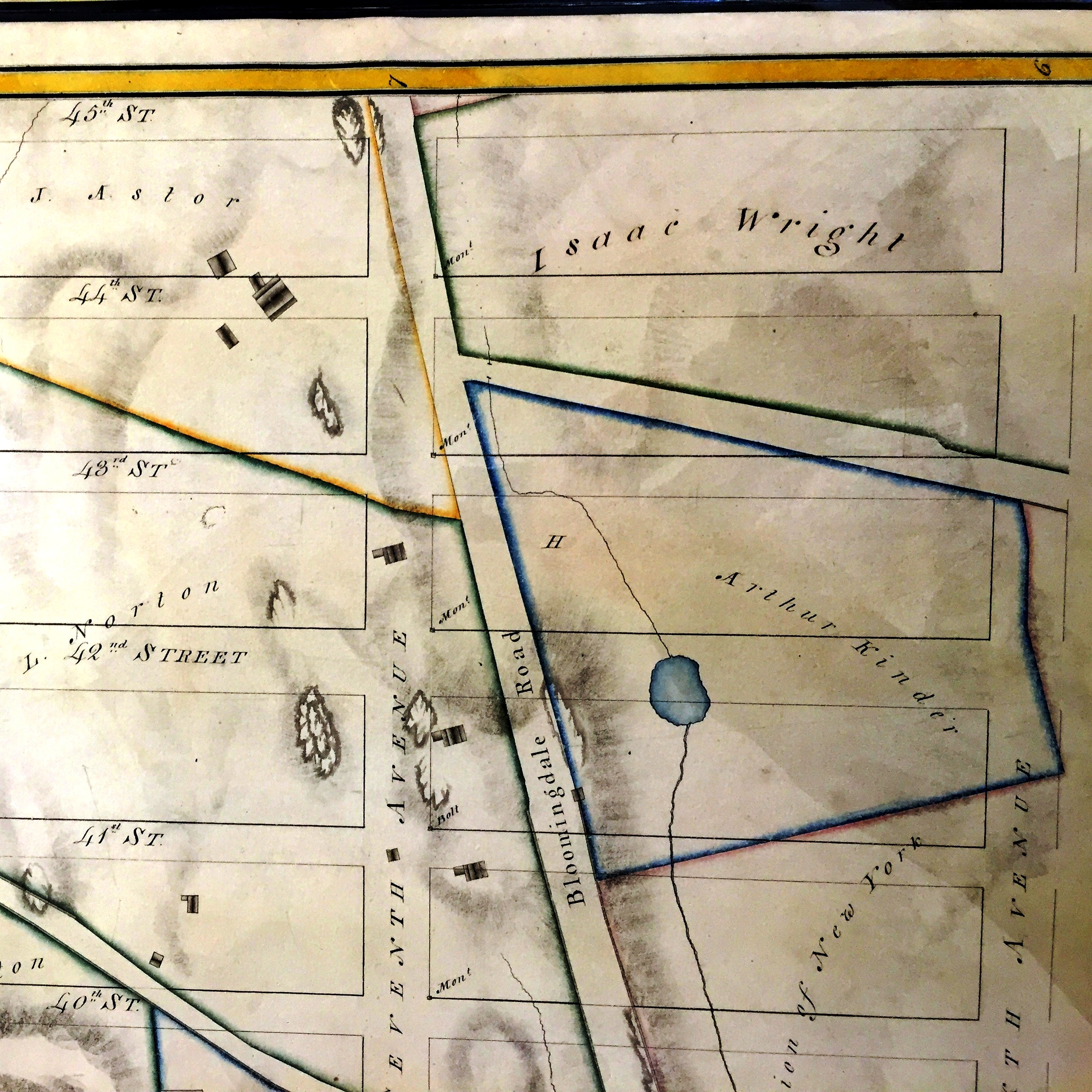
Lowes Lane meets Bloomingdale Road, 1820

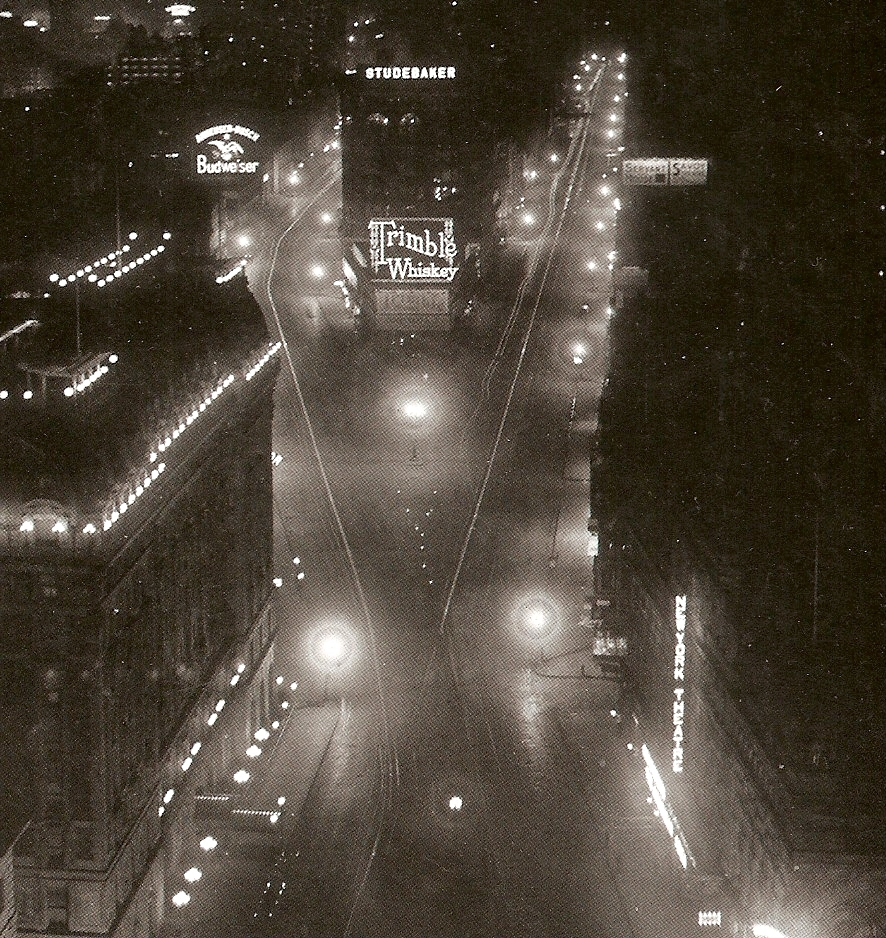
A 1904 photo of north end of Times Square before the creation of Duffy Square

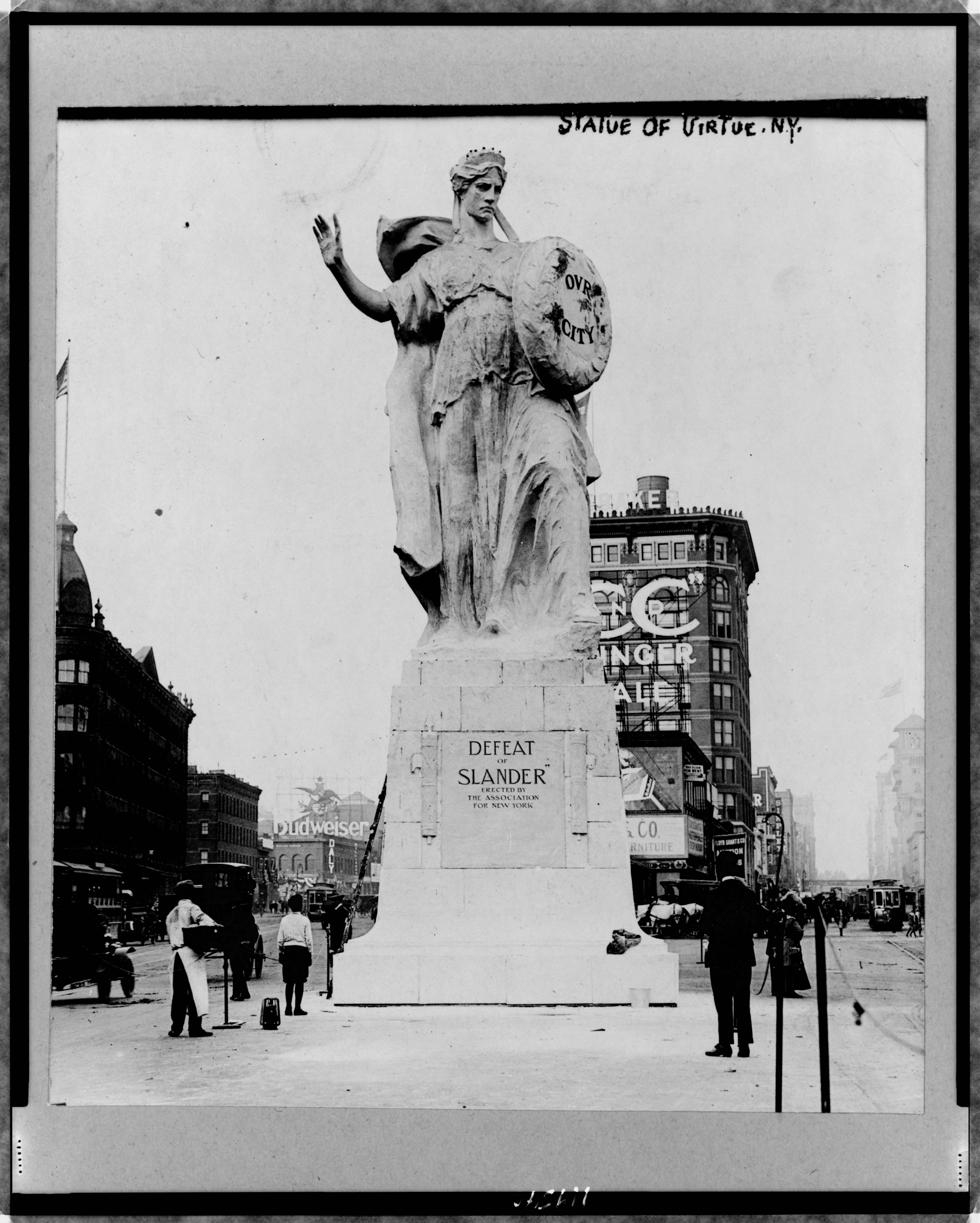
Defeat of Slander statue

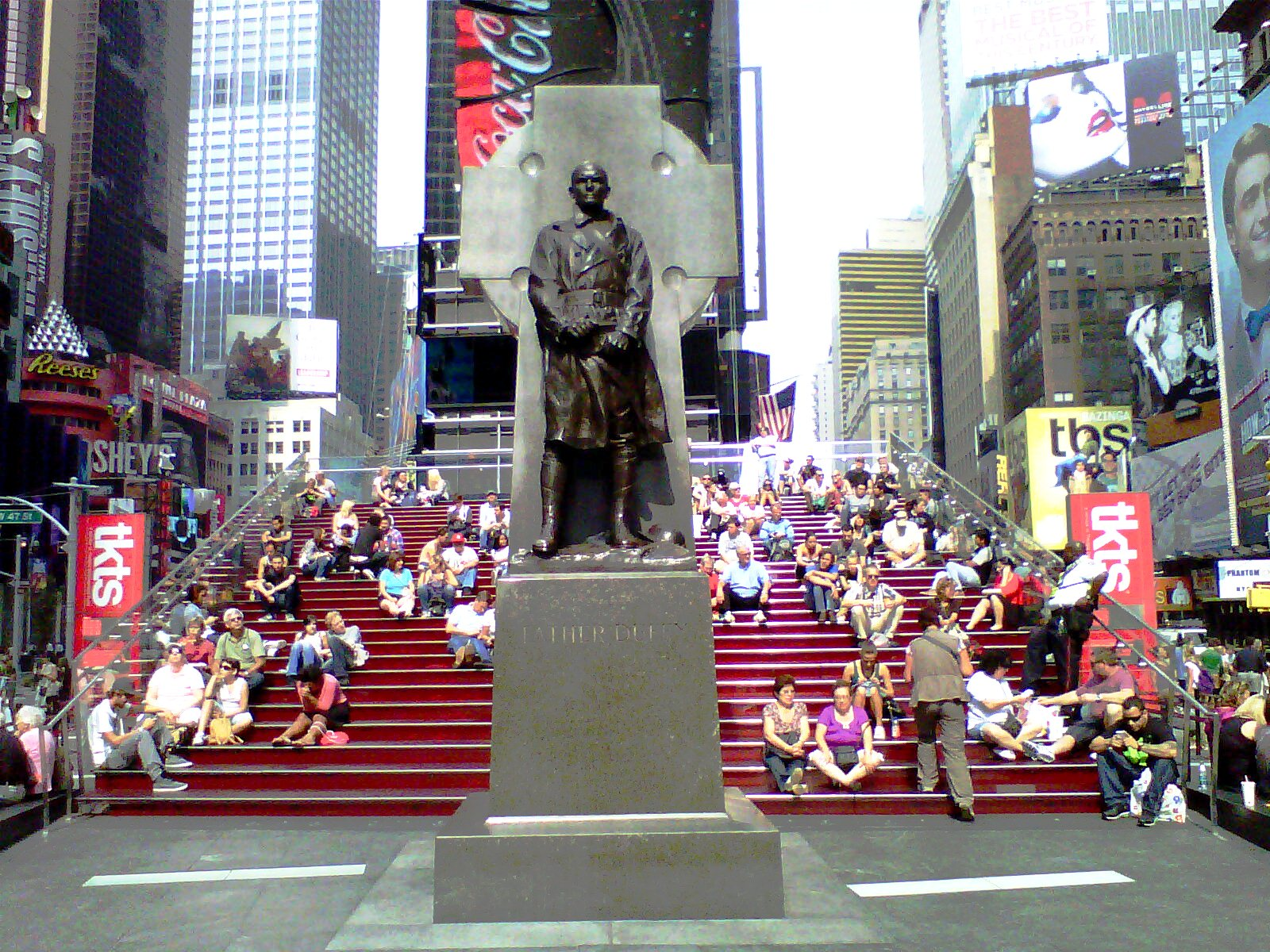
The red steps behind the statue of Father Duffy are the roof of the TKTS booth

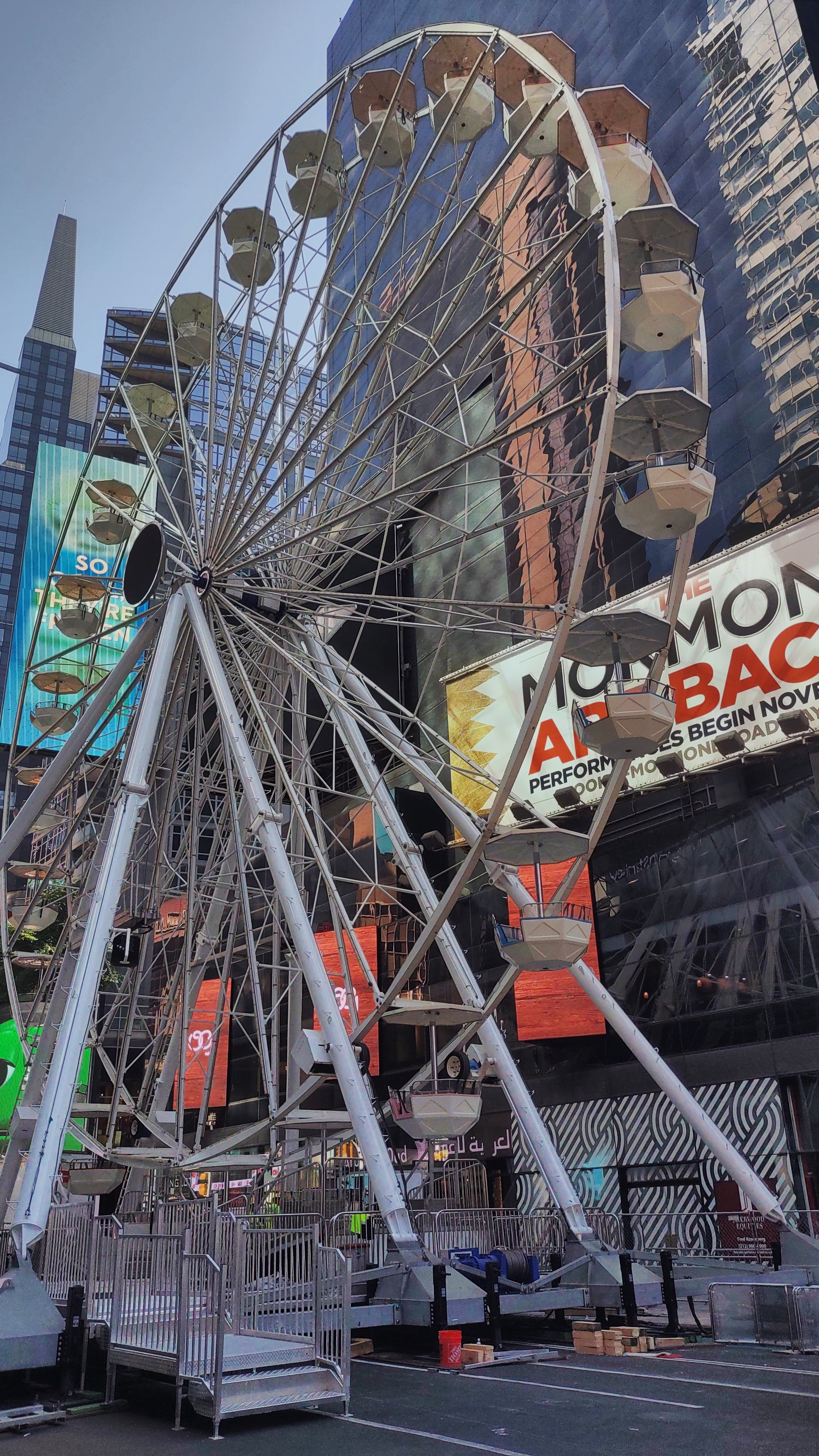
Ferris wheel under construction, August 2021
