= Statue of Francis P. Duffy =

Statue in Times Square, Manhattan, New York, U.S.

Father Francis P. Duffy
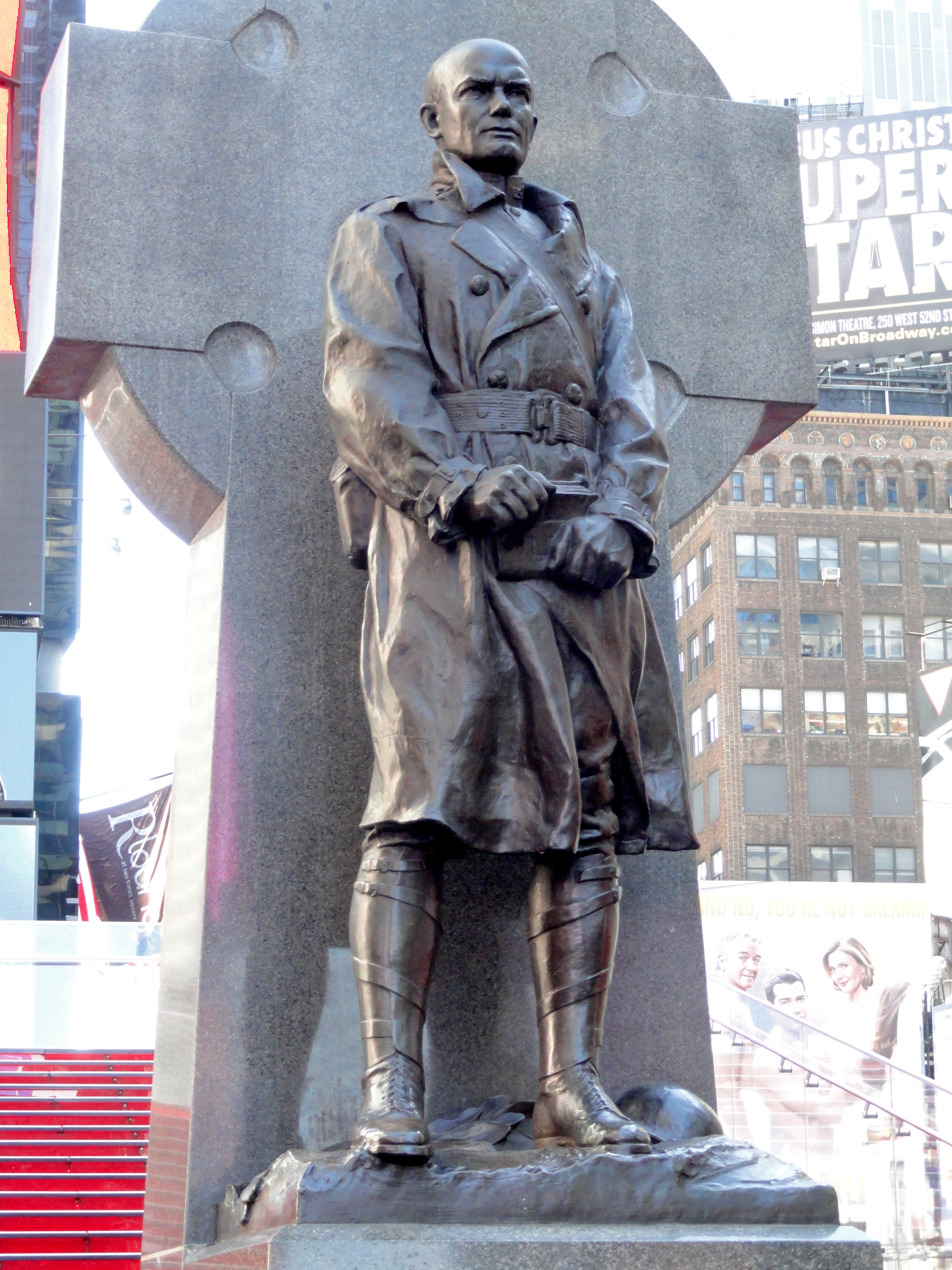
- The sculpture in 2012
- Artist: Charles Keck
- Year: 1936–1937
- Type: Sculpture
- Location: New York City, New York; 40.759045°N 73.984987°W

An outdoor 1936–1937 statue of Francis P. Duffy by Charles Keck is installed at Duffy Square, part of Times Square, in the New York City borough of Manhattan. The statue, which was dedicated on May 2, 1937, and has the title Father Francis P. Duffy, earned Keck a Grand Lodge Medal for Distinguished Achievement from the Masonic order.

== See also ==
- 1937 in art
