= Gambling (play) =

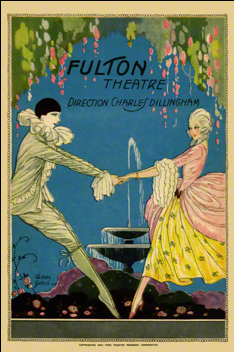
- Playbill cover
- Original language: English
- Written by: George M. Cohan

Premiere
- Date: August 26, 1929
- Place: Fulton Theatre; New York City

Gambling is a 1929 play by George M. Cohan.

After initial performances in Philadelphia, Atlantic City, New Jersey and Brooklyn, the play opened at the Fulton Theatre on Broadway from August 26, 1929 until January 1930, for 152 performances. It was made into a movie in 1934.

== Broadway cast ==
- Harry Lillford as Sheridan
- Harold Healy as Connelly
- George M. Cohan as Draper
- Robert Middlemass as Freelock
- Dan Carey as Lewis
- Neil Stone as Carlysle
- Isabel Baring as Dorothy
- Douglas McPherson as Braddock
- Mary Philips as Mazie
- Charles Johnson as Brennan
- Kathleen Niday as Marie
- Theodore Newton as Gaylor
- Ernest Fox as Martin
- Mark Sullivan as Mason
- William Gillard as Buddy
- Mary Fox as Maid
- Jack Williams as Captain
- Jack Leslie as Knowles
- Duke Keeley as Wayne
- Joseph Halsey as Attendant
- Irving Jackson as Messenger
- Lydia McMillan as Mrs. Cromley
- Edward F. Namary as Chief
- Jane Thomas as Miss Daly
