= New York Review (Catholic journal) =

The New York Review was a bimonthly Catholic periodical founded in 1905 by diocesan priests Francis P. Duffy and John F. Brady, of the faculty of Saint Joseph's Seminary (Dunwoodie). At the time, the New York Review was the most scholarly and progressive Catholic theological publication in the United States. Under suspicion of modernism, the journal ceased publication in 1908.

== Founding ==
Saint Joseph's, in Dunwoodie, Yonkers, is the major seminary of the Archdiocese of New York. From 1896 to 1906 it was staffed by Sulpicians and diocesan priests. According to Professor Thomas J. Shelley, "[b]y 1905 it [Dunwoodie] possessed the strongest faculty of any Catholic seminary in the United States."

Francis Duffy was professor of Philosophical Psychology and editor of the New York Review. Extremely popular with students, he was part of a group of faculty members who introduced innovations into the seminary curriculum, putting the institution in the forefront of clerical education. With the support of Sulpician Rector Father James Driscoll, Brady and Duffy obtained the approval of Archbishop John Farley to publish a journal presenting the latest developments in Catholic scholarship. The first issue of the New York Review: A Journal of the Ancient Faith and Modern Thought was released on June 21, 1905.

The Review printed papers by leading Catholic Biblical experts who were part of the newly emerging schools of Biblical criticism, which raised eyebrows in Rome. They printed articles by Albert Lagrange and others. Francis Gigot was a noted Scripture scholar whose writings troubled the Sulpician superiors in Paris, who demanded prepublication approval. When they attempted to have Driscoll rein in Gigot, he, Gigot, and three others withdrew from the Society of St. Sulpice in January, 1906. They were incardinated by Archbishop Farley into the archdiocese, and continued their work in the seminary, which thus passed from the charge of the Sulpicians. The Sulpicians complained to Rome.

While The New York Review itself never published an article that was suspect, it did print papers by leading Catholic Biblical experts who were part of the newly emerging schools of Biblical criticism, and several of these authors' other works raised eyebrows in Rome. Among these was controversial modernist theologian George Tyrrell. In January 1908, Diomede Falconio Apostolic Delegate to the United States, advised Farley that Rome was not favoarbly impressed. Farley argued that all writers, including Tyrrell, were in good standing at the time their articles were published, but he nonetheless ordered The Review closed.

The New York Review fell under suspicion of the heresy of modernism. Around 1908, the Review was discontinued, ostensibly for financial reasons, although there is strong evidence that it was suppressed for suspicion of modernist tendencies. Contributing members of the faculty were reassigned to other work. Duffy later became chaplain of The Fighting 68th. Fathers Francis Gigot and Joseph Bruneau continued to teach but ceased publishing.

== Legacy ==
Driscoll, Gigot, and other Dunwoodie faculty members wrote a number of articles for the Catholic Encyclopedia. The New York Review was succeeded by The Dunwoodie Review in 1961.
