= Broadway Jones (film) =

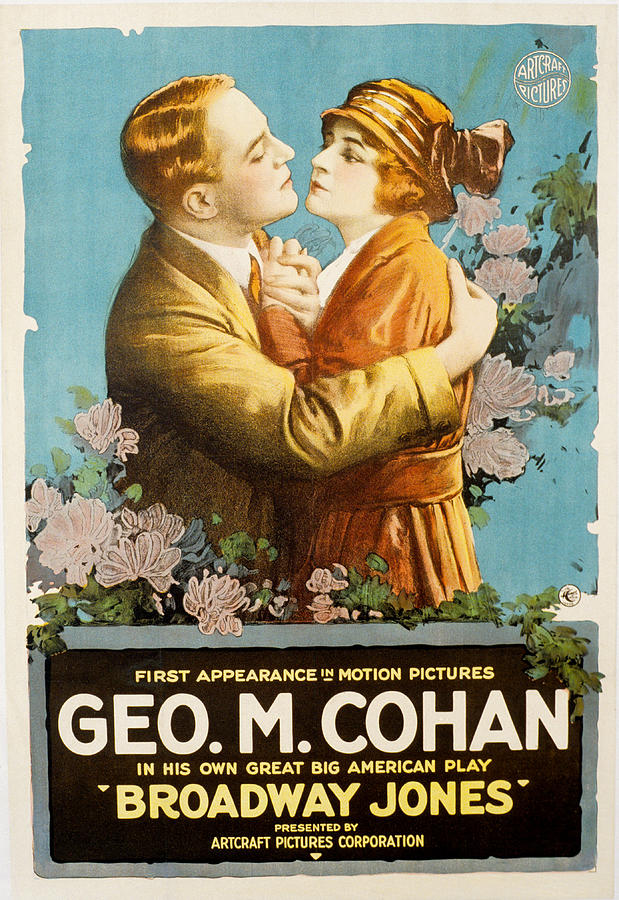
- Film poster
- Directed by: Joseph Kaufman
- Based on: Broadway Jones by George M. Cohan
- Produced by: George M. Cohan
- Starring: George M. Cohan
- Cinematography: Lawrence E. Williams
- Distributed by: Paramount Pictures
- Release date: April 2, 1917
- Running time: 60 minutes
- Country: United States
- Language: Silent (English intertitles)

Broadway Jones is a lost 1917 American silent comedy film directed by Joseph Kaufman and starring George M. Cohan, in his film debut, in a motion picture based on his 1912 play, Broadway Jones.

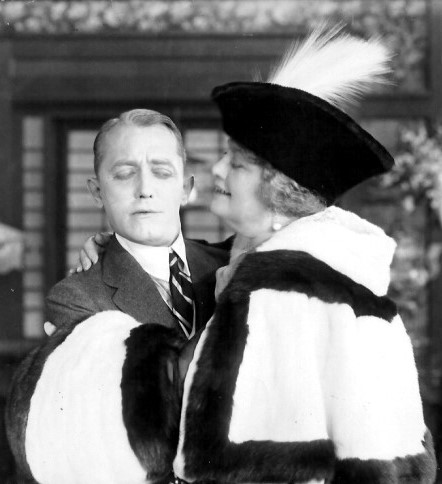
George M. Cohan and Ida Darling in publicity photo, 1917

Though no known copies survive of the film, a 1931 Paramount promotional film, The House That Shadows Built, contains a clip of Cohan which may be from either Broadway Jones or one of two other lost Cohan silent films from around the same time.

== Cast ==
- George M. Cohan as Broadway Jones
- Marguerite Snow as Josie Richards
- Russell Bassett as Andrew Jones
- Crauford Kent as Robert Wallace (credited as Crawford Kent)
- Ida Darling as Mrs. Gerard
- Joseph W. Smiley (credited as Joe Smiley)
- John De Lacey

== Production ==
Production was delayed due to the principal cast being temporarily blinded by the lights on the Knickerbocker Hotel lobby set.
