= George M. Cohan =

American actor, singer, composer and playwright (1878–1942)

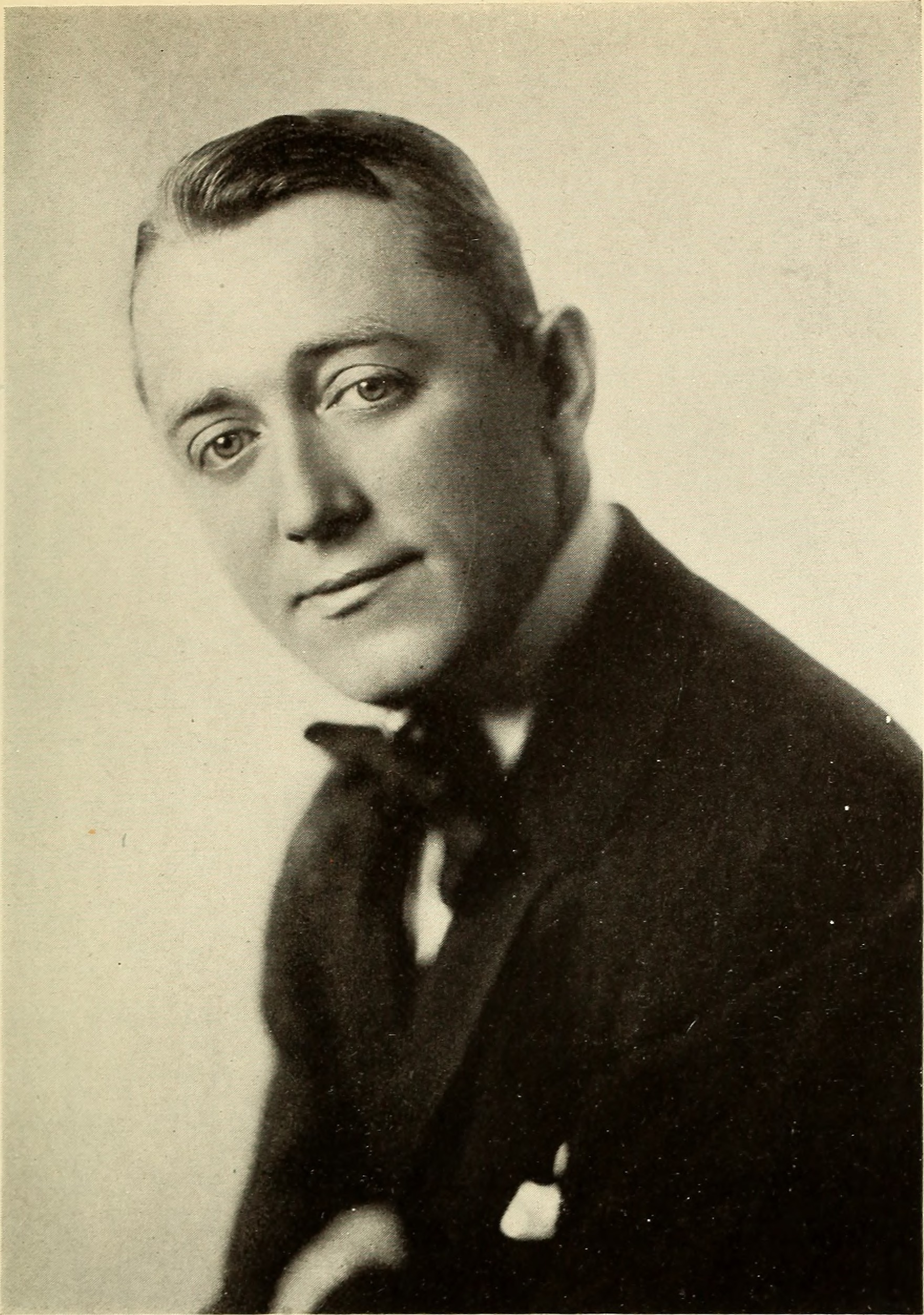
- Cohan in 1918
- Born: George Michael Cohan; July 3, 1878; Providence, Rhode Island, U.S.
- Died: November 5, 1942 (aged 64); Manhattan, New York City, U.S.
- Occupations: Entertainer; playwright; composer; lyricist; actor; singer; dancer; producer
- Years active: 1886–1940
- Spouses: Ethel Levey (m. 1899; div. 1907); Agnes Mary Nolan (m. 1907)
- Children: 4, including Mary and Helen

George Michael Cohan (July 3, 1878 – November 5, 1942) was an American entertainer, playwright, composer, lyricist, actor, singer, dancer and theatrical producer.

Cohan began his career as a child, performing with his parents and sister in a vaudeville act known as "The Four Cohans". Beginning with Little Johnny Jones in 1904, he wrote, composed, produced, and appeared in more than three dozen musicals on Broadway. Cohan wrote more than 50 shows and published more than 300 songs during his lifetime, including the standards "Over There", "Give My Regards to Broadway", "The Yankee Doodle Boy" and "You're a Grand Old Flag". As a composer, he was one of the early members of the American Society of Composers, Authors, and Publishers (ASCAP). He displayed remarkable theatrical longevity, appearing in films until the 1930s and continuing to perform as a headline artist until 1940.

He was known in the decade before World War I as "the man who owned Broadway". His life and music were depicted in the Oscar-winning film Yankee Doodle Dandy (1942) and the 1968 musical George M!. A statue of Cohan in Times Square, New York City, commemorates his contributions to American musical theatre.

== Early life ==
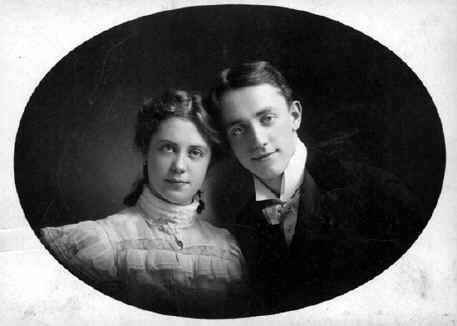
Cohan and his sister Josie in the 1890s

Cohan was born in 1878 in Providence, Rhode Island, to Irish Catholic parents. A baptismal certificate from St. Joseph's Roman Catholic Church (which gave the wrong first name for his mother) indicated that Cohan was born on July 3, but he and his family always insisted that he had been "born on the Fourth of July!" His parents were traveling vaudeville performers, and he joined them on stage while still an infant, first as a prop, learning to dance and sing soon after he could walk and talk.

Cohan started as a child performer at age 8, first on the violin and then as a dancer. He was the fourth member of the family vaudeville act called The Four Cohans, which included his father Jeremiah "Jere" (Keohane) Cohan (1848–1917), mother Helen "Nellie" Costigan Cohan (1854–1928) and sister Josephine "Josie" Cohan Niblo (1876–1916). In 1890, he toured as the star of a show called Peck's Bad Boy and then joined the family act. The Four Cohans mostly toured together from 1890 to 1901. Cohan and his sister made their Broadway debuts in 1893 in a sketch called The Lively Bootblack. Temperamental in his early years, he later learned to control his frustrations. During these years, he originated his famous curtain speech: "My mother thanks you, my father thanks you, my sister thanks you, and I thank you."

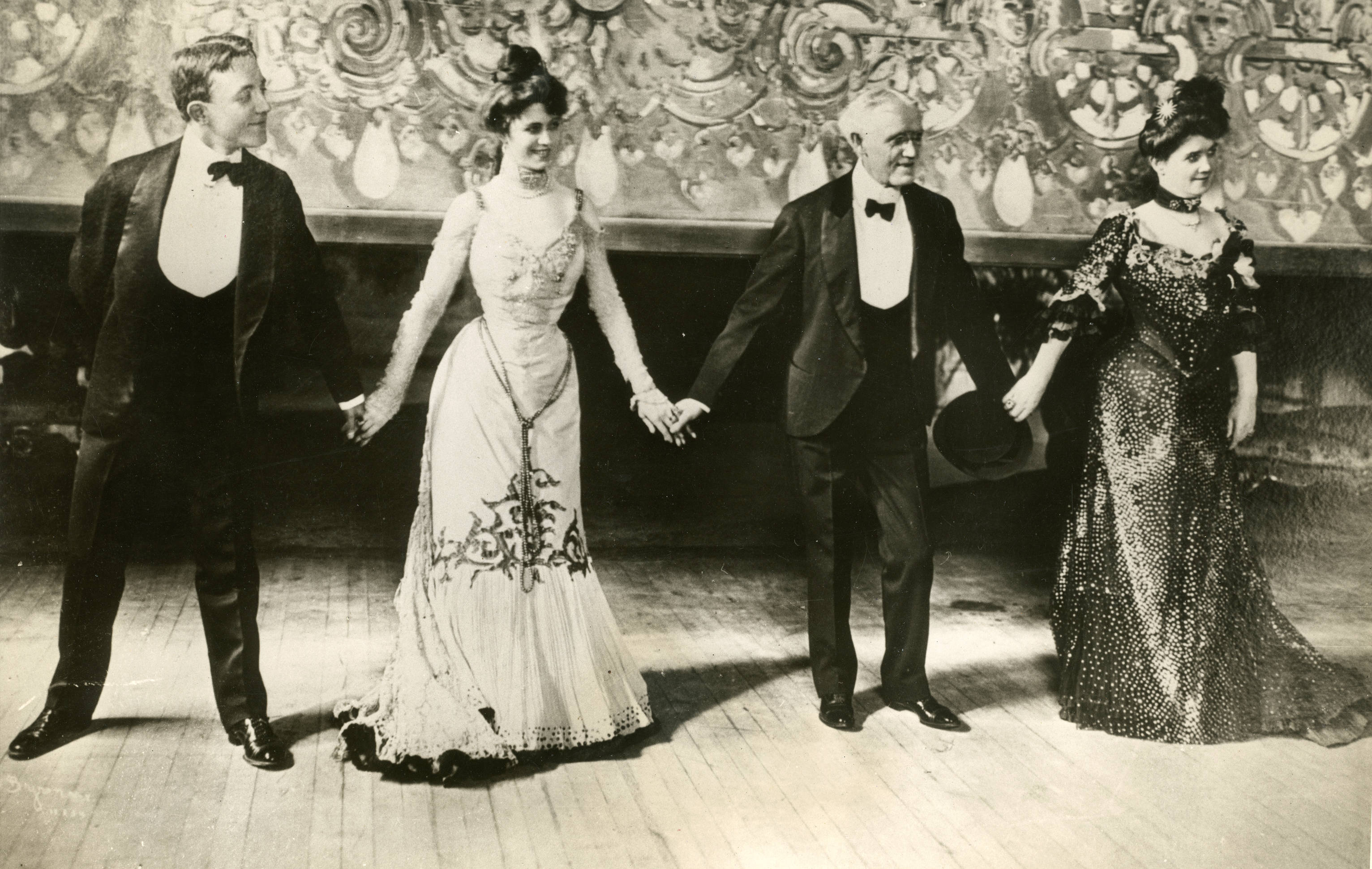
The Four Cohans in 1915

As a child, Cohan and his family toured most of the year and spent summer vacations from the vaudeville circuit at his grandmother's home in North Brookfield, Massachusetts, where he befriended baseball player Connie Mack. The family generally gave a performance at the town hall there each summer, and Cohan had a chance to gain some more normal childhood experiences, like riding his bike and playing sandlot baseball. His memories of those happy summers inspired his 1907 musical 50 Miles from Boston, which is set in North Brookfield and contains one of his most famous songs, "Harrigan". As he matured through his teens, he used the quiet summers there to write. When he returned to the town in the cast of Ah, Wilderness! in 1934, he told a reporter "I've knocked around everywhere, but there's no place like North Brookfield."

== Career ==
=== Early career ===
Cohan began writing original skits (over 150 of them) and songs for the family act in both vaudeville and minstrel shows while in his teens. Soon he was writing professionally, selling his first songs to a national publisher in 1893. In 1901 he wrote, directed and produced his first Broadway musical, The Governor's Son, for The Four Cohans. His first big Broadway hit in 1904 was the show Little Johnny Jones, which introduced his tunes "Give My Regards to Broadway" and "The Yankee Doodle Boy".

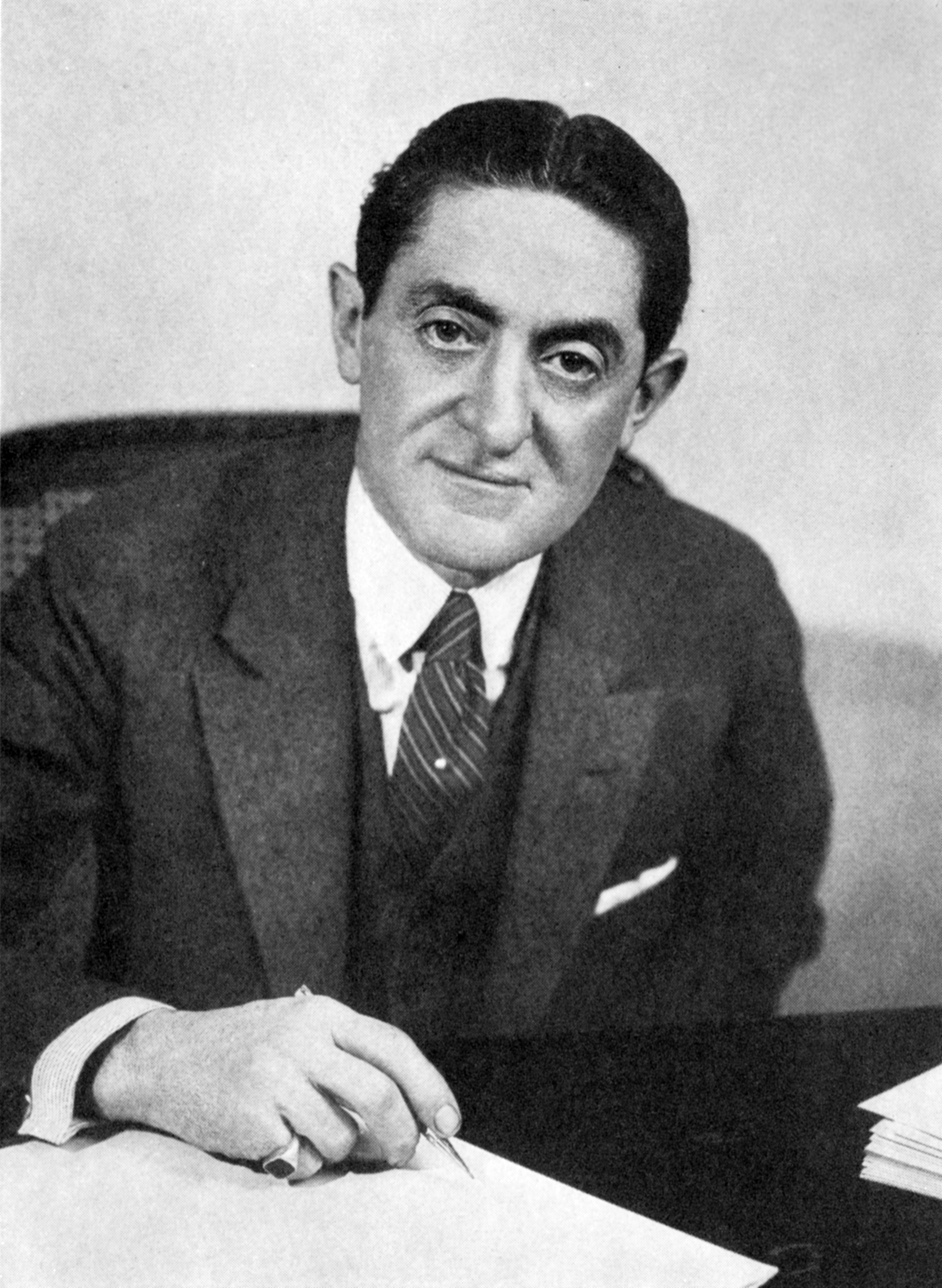
Sam H. Harris (1928)

Cohan became one of the leading Tin Pan Alley songwriters, publishing upwards of 300 original songs noted for their catchy melodies and clever lyrics. His most popular songs included:

- "Give My Regards to Broadway"
- "You're a Grand Old Flag"
- "Forty-Five Minutes from Broadway"
- "Mary Is a Grand Old Name"
- "The Warmest Baby in the Bunch"
- "Life's a Funny Proposition After All"
- "I Want To Hear a Yankee Doodle Tune"
- "You Won't Do Any Business if You Haven't Got a Band"
- "The Small Town Gal"
- "I'm Mighty Glad I'm Living, That's All"
- "That Haunting Melody"
- "Always Leave Them Laughing When You Say Goodbye"
- "When You Come Back and You Will Come Back"
- "Over There", America's most popular World War I song, was recorded by Nora Bayes, Enrico Caruso, and others. The song reached such currency among troops and shipyard workers that a ship was named "Costigan" after Cohan's grandfather, Dennis Costigan. During the christening, "Over There" was played.

From 1904 to 1920, Cohan created and produced over 50 musicals, plays and revues on Broadway together with his friend Sam H. Harris. Aside from the plays Cohan wrote or composed, he produced with Harris, among others, many of which were adapted for film, It Pays to Advertise (1914) and the successful Going Up in 1917, which became a smash hit in London the following year. His shows ran simultaneously in as many as five theatres. One of Cohan's most innovative plays was a dramatization of the mystery Seven Keys to Baldpate in 1913, which baffled some audiences and critics but became a hit. Cohan further adapted it as a film in 1917, and it was adapted for film six more times, as well as for TV and radio. He dropped out of acting for some years after his 1919 dispute with Actors' Equity Association.

In 1912 Cohan and Harris acquired Chicago's Grand Opera House and renamed the theatre "George M. Cohan's Grand Opera House". It was renamed "Four Cohans Theatre" in 1926 but reverted to Grand Opera House in 1928 when Cohan divested the property and the Shubert family became the sole owners of the theatre.

In 1925, he published his autobiography Twenty Years on Broadway and the Years It Took to Get There.

=== Later career ===
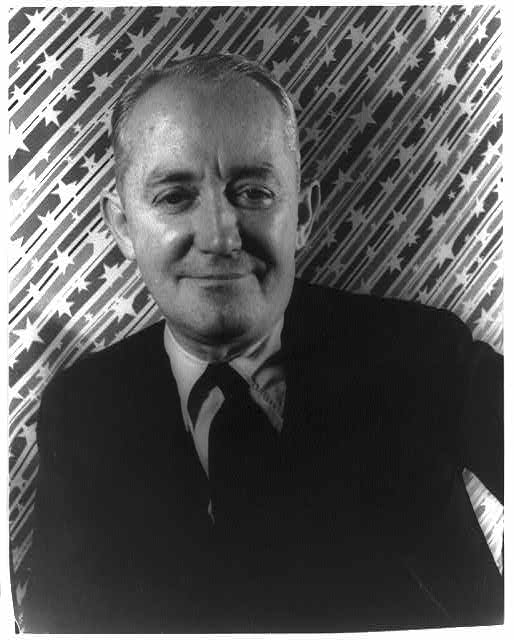
Cohan in a 1933 photograph by Carl Van Vechten.

Cohan appeared in 1930 in The Song and Dance Man, a revival of his tribute to vaudeville and his father. In 1932, he starred in a dual role as a cold, corrupt politician and his charming, idealistic campaign double in the Hollywood musical film The Phantom President. The film co-starred Claudette Colbert and Jimmy Durante, with songs by Rodgers and Hart, and was released by Paramount Pictures. He appeared in some earlier silent films, but he disliked Hollywood production methods and only made one other sound film, Gambling (1934), based on his own 1929 play and shot in New York City. A critic called Gambling a "stodgy adaptation of a definitely dated play directed in obsolete theatrical technique". It is considered a lost film.

By the 1930s, Cohan walked in and out of retirement. He earned acclaim as a serious actor in Eugene O'Neill's only comedy Ah, Wilderness! (1933) and in the role of a song-and-dance President Franklin D. Roosevelt in Rodgers and Hart's musical I'd Rather Be Right (1937). The same year, he reunited with Harris to produce a play titled Fulton of Oak Falls, starring Cohan. His final play, The Return of the Vagabond (1940), featured a young Celeste Holm in the cast.

In 1940, Judy Garland played the title role in a film version of his 1922 musical Little Nellie Kelly. Cohan's mystery play Seven Keys to Baldpate was first filmed in 1916 and has been remade seven times, most recently as House of the Long Shadows (1983), starring Vincent Price. In 1942, a musical biopic of Cohan, Yankee Doodle Dandy, was released, and James Cagney's performance in the title role earned the Best Actor Academy Award. The film was privately screened for Cohan as he battled the last stages of abdominal cancer, and he commented on Cagney's performance: "My God, what an act to follow!" Cohan's 1920 play The Meanest Man in the World was filmed in 1943 with Jack Benny.

== Legacy ==
Although Cohan is mainly remembered for his songs, he became an early pioneer in the development of the "book musical", using his engaging libretti to bridge the gaps between drama and music. More than three decades before Agnes de Mille choreographed Oklahoma! Cohan used dance not merely as razzle-dazzle, but to advance the plot. Cohan's main characters were "average Joes and Janes" who appealed to a wide American audience.

In 1914, Cohan became one of the founding members of ASCAP. Although Cohan was known as generous to his fellow actors in need, in 1919, he unsuccessfully opposed a historic strike by Actors' Equity Association, for which many in the theatrical professions never forgave him. Cohan opposed the strike because in addition to being an actor in his productions, he was also the producer of the musical that set the terms and conditions of the actors' employment. During the strike, he donated $100,000 (equal to $1,857,006 today) to finance the Actors' Retirement Fund in Englewood Cliffs, New Jersey. After Actors' Equity was recognized, Cohan refused to join the union as an actor, which hampered his ability to appear in his own productions. Cohan sought a waiver from Equity allowing him to act in any theatrical production. In 1930, he won a law case against the Internal Revenue Service that allowed the deduction, for federal income tax purposes, of his business travel and entertainment expenses, even though he was not able to document them with certainty. This became known as the "Cohan rule" and frequently is cited in tax cases.

Cohan wrote numerous Broadway musicals and straight plays in addition to contributing material to shows written by others – more than 50 in all – many of which were made into films. His shows included:

- The Governor's Son (1901)
- Running for Office (1903)
- Little Johnny Jones (1904)
- Forty-five Minutes from Broadway (1905)
- Popularity (1906)
- George Washington, Jr. (1906)
- The Honeymooners (1907)
- Fifty Miles From Boston (1908)
- The Talk of New York (1907)
- The Yankee Prince (1908)
- Cohan and Harris Minstrels (1908)
- The Fortune Hunter (1909) (produced and directed)
- The American Idea (1909) (produced and directed)
- The Man Who Owns Broadway (1909)
- Get-Rich-Quick Wallingford (1910)
- The Aviator (1910) (produced)
- The Little Millionaire (1911)
- The Only Son (1911) (produced)
- The Red Widow (1911) (produced)
- Officer 666 (1912) (produced)
- Broadway Jones (1912)
- Hawthorne of the USA (1912) (produced)
- Stop Thief (1912) (produced)
- Nearly Married (1913) (produced)
- Seven Keys to Baldpate (1913)
- The Beauty Shop (1914) (produced)
- It Pays to Advertise (1914) (produced)
- The Miracle Man (1914)
- Hello, Broadway! (1914)
- Young America (1915) (produced)
- The House of Glass (1915)
- Hit-the-Trail-Holiday (1915)
- The Cohan Revue of 1916 (and 1918; co-written with Irving Berlin)
- Honest John O'Brien (1916)
- The Intruder (1916) (produced)
- Captain Kidd Jr. (1916) (produced)
- The Willow Tree (1917) (produced)
- A Tailor-Made Man (1917) (produced)
- The King (1917) (produced)
- Going Up (1917) (produced)
- Cohan Revue of 1918 (1918)

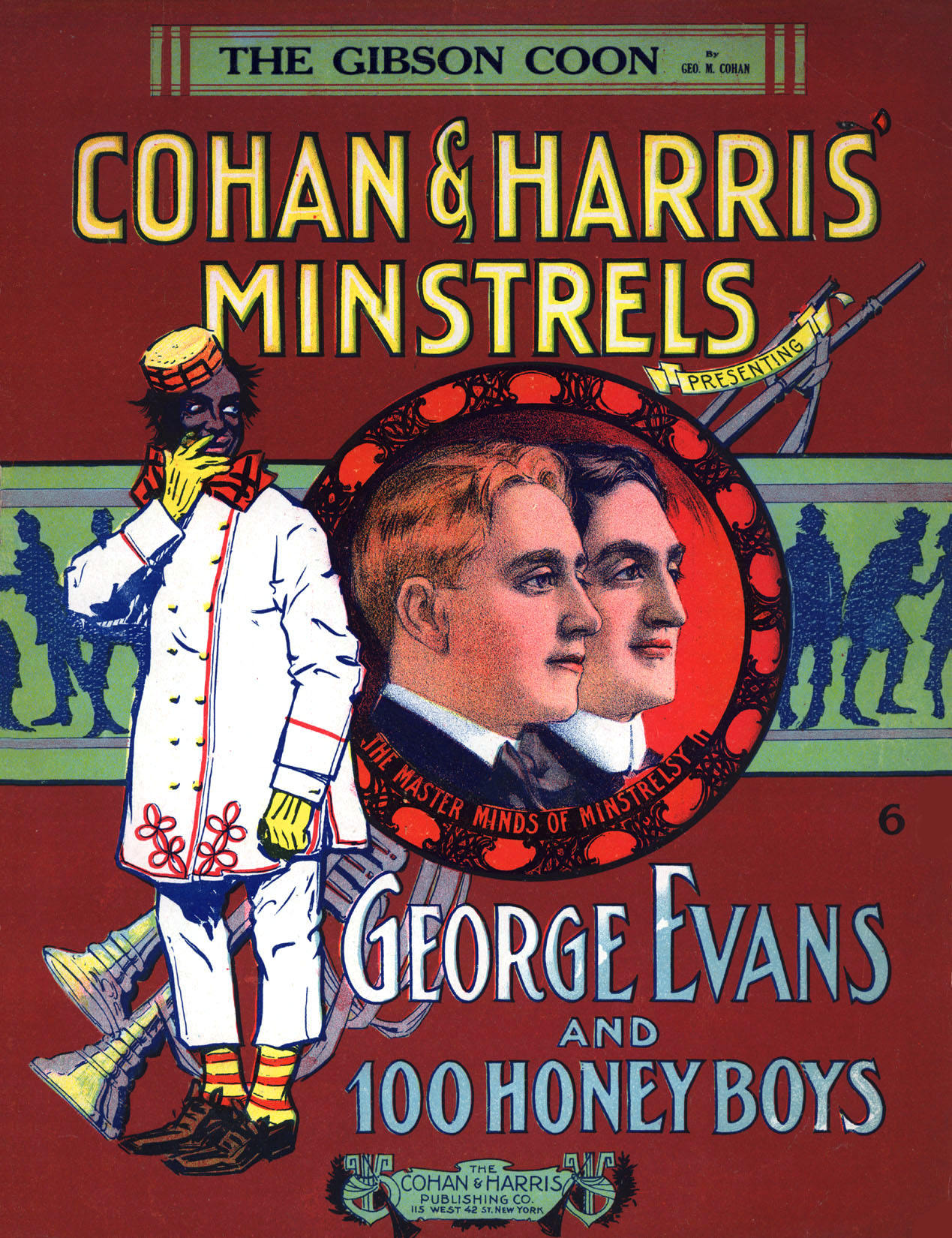
1908 sheet music cover for Cohan & Harris Minstrels

- The Little Teacher (1918) (produced)
- Once Upon a Time (1918) (produced)
- Three Faces East (1918) (produced)
- The Matinee Hero (1918) (produced)
- A Prince There Was (1918)
- The Voice of McConnell (1918)
- Mis'Nelly of N'Orleans (1919) (produced)
- The Royal Vagabond (1919)
- The Acquittal (1920)
- Genius and the Crowd (1920) (produced)
- The Tavern (1920)
- The Meanest Man in the World (1920)
- Mary (1920) (produced)
- Nemesis (1921) (produced)
- The O'Brien Girl (1921) (produced)
- Little Nellie Kelly (1922)
- So This is London (1922)
- Two Fellows and a Girl (1922)
- The Rise of Rosie O'Reilly (1923, featuring a 13-year-old Ruby Keeler among the chorus girls)
- The Song and Dance Man (1923)
- American Born (1925)
- The Home Towners (1926)
- Yellow (1926) (Produced)
- Baby Cyclone (1927, one of Spencer Tracy's early roles)
- The Merry Malones (1927)
- Los Angeles (1927) (produced)
- Whispering Friends (1928)
- Elmer the Great (1928) (produced; written by Ring Lardner)
- By Request (1928) (produced)
- Billie (1928)
- Vermont (1929) (produced)
- Gambling (1929)
- The Rhapsody (1930) (produced)
- Friendship (1931)
- Pigeons and People (1933)
- Ah, Wilderness (1933) (Actor) (written by Eugene O' Neill)
- Dear Old Darling (1936)
- Fulton of Five Oaks (1937)
- I'd Rather Be Right (1937) (acted)
- The Return of the Vagabond (1940)
- George M! (1968)

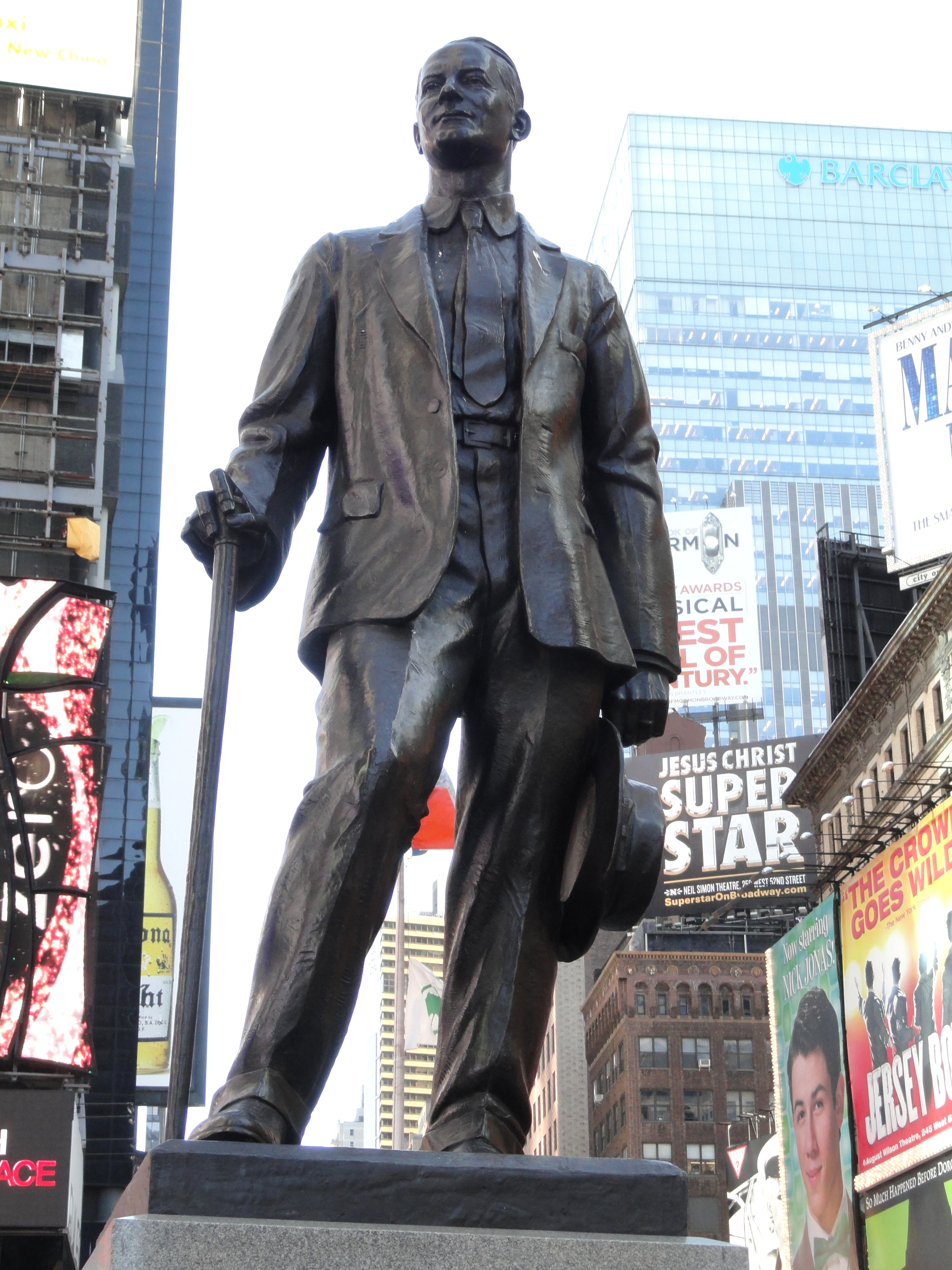
Cohan's statue in Duffy Square (the northern portion of Times Square), Manhattan, New York City

Cohan was called "the greatest single figure the American theatre ever produced – as a player, playwright, actor, composer and producer". On May 1, 1940, President Franklin Delano Roosevelt presented him with the Congressional Gold Medal for his contributions to World War I morale, in particular with the songs "You're a Grand Old Flag" and "Over There". Cohan was the first person in any artistic field selected for this honor, which previously had gone only to military and political leaders, philanthropists, scientists, inventors, and explorers.

In 1959, at the behest of lyricist Oscar Hammerstein II, a $100,000 bronze statue of Cohan was dedicated in Duffy Square (the northern portion of Times Square) at Broadway and 46th Street in Manhattan. The 8-foot bronze remains the only statue of an actor on Broadway. He was inducted into the Songwriters Hall of Fame in 1970. His star on the Hollywood Walk of Fame is located at 6734 Hollywood Boulevard. Cohan was inducted into the Long Island Music Hall of Fame on October 15, 2006.

The United States Postal Service issued a 15-cent commemorative stamp honoring Cohan on the anniversary of his centenary, July 3, 1978. The stamp depicts both the older Cohan and his younger self as a dancer, with the tag line "Yankee Doodle Dandy". It was designed by Jim Sharpe. In 1999, Captain Kenneth R. Force and the United States Merchant Marine Academy Regimental Band led a successful effort to preserve Cohan's home on Long Island. As a result, Cohan's family gave the Merchant Marine Academy Regimental Band the name "George M. Cohan's Own". On July 3, 2009, a bronze bust of Cohan, by artist Robert Shure, was unveiled at the corner of Wickenden and Governor Streets in Fox Point, Providence, a few blocks from his birthplace. The city renamed the corner the George M. Cohan Plaza and announced an annual George M. Cohan Award for Excellence in Art & Culture. The first award went to Curt Columbus, the artistic director of Trinity Repertory Company.

== Personal life ==
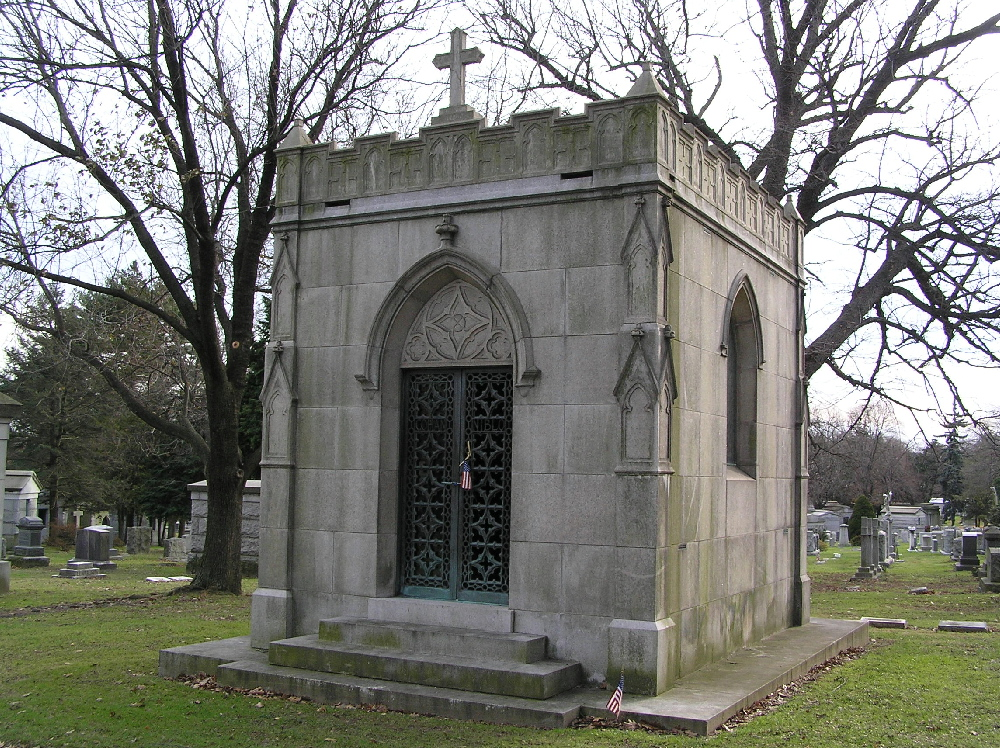
Cohan's mausoleum in Woodlawn Cemetery

From 1899 to 1907, Cohan was married to Ethel Levey (1881–1955; born Grace Ethelia Fowler,) a musical comedy actress and dancer. Levey and Cohan had a daughter, actress Georgette Cohan Souther Rowse (1900–1988). Levey joined the Four Cohans when Cohan's sister Josie married, and she starred in Little Johnny Jones and other Cohan works. In 1907, Levey divorced Cohan on grounds of adultery.

In 1907, Cohan married Agnes Mary Nolan (1883–1972), who had been a dancer in his early shows; they remained married until his death. They had two daughters and a son. The eldest was Mary Cohan Ronkin, a cabaret singer in the 1930s, who composed incidental music for her father's play The Tavern. In 1968, Mary supervised musical and lyric revisions for the musical George M! Their second daughter was Helen Cohan Carola, a film actress, who performed on Broadway with her father in Friendship in 1931. Their youngest child was George Michael Cohan, Jr. (1914–2000), who graduated from Georgetown University and served in the entertainment corps during World War II. In the 1950s, George Jr. reinterpreted his father's songs on recordings, in a nightclub act, and in television appearances on the Ed Sullivan and Milton Berle shows. George Jr.'s only child, Michaela Marie Cohan (1943–1999), was the last descendant named Cohan. She graduated with a theater degree from Marywood College in Pennsylvania in 1965. From 1966 to 1968, she served in a civilian Special Services unit in Vietnam and Korea. In 1996, she stood in for her ailing father at the ceremony marking her grandfather's induction into the Musical Theatre Hall of Fame at New York University.

Cohan was a devoted baseball fan, regularly attending games of the New York Giants.

== Death ==
Cohan died of bladder cancer at the age of 64 on November 5, 1942, at his Manhattan apartment on Fifth Avenue, surrounded by family and friends. His funeral was held at St. Patrick's Cathedral, New York, and was attended by thousands of people, including five governors of New York, two mayors of New York City and the Postmaster General. The honorary pallbearers included Irving Berlin, Eddie Cantor, Frank Crowninshield, Sol Bloom, Brooks Atkinson, Rube Goldberg, Walter Huston, George Jessel, Connie Mack, Joseph McCarthy, Eugene O'Neill, Sigmund Romberg, Lee Shubert and Fred Waring. Cohan was interred at Woodlawn Cemetery in The Bronx, New York City, in a private family mausoleum he had erected a quarter century earlier for his sister and parents.

== In popular culture ==
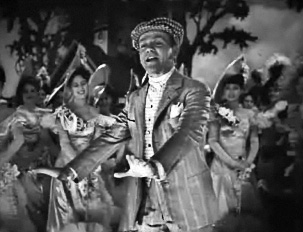
James Cagney as Cohan in the 1942 film Yankee Doodle Dandy

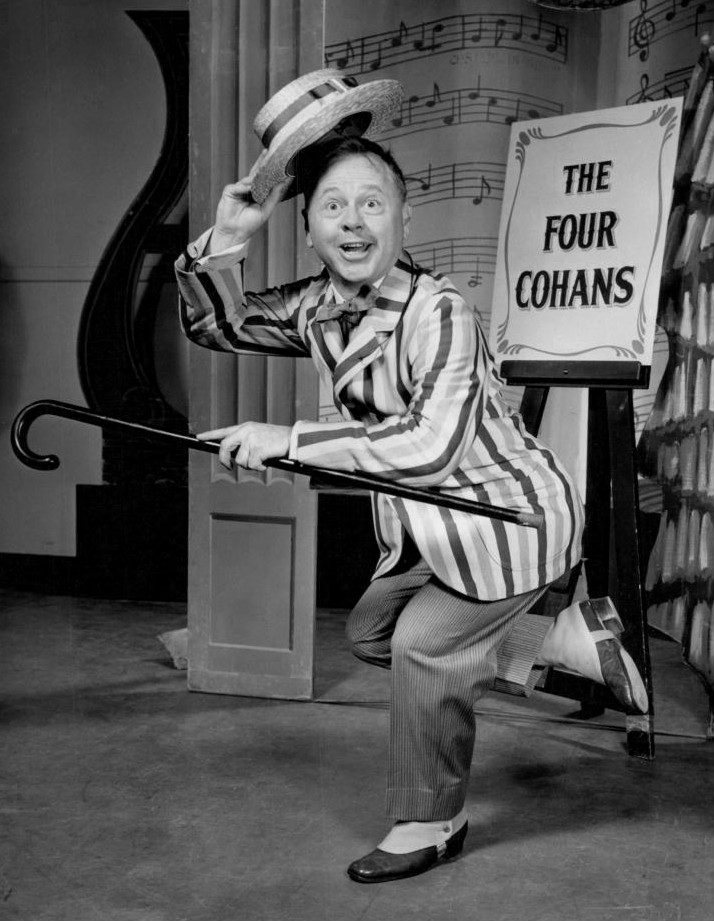
Mickey Rooney as Cohan in the 1957 Mr. Broadway television special

- James Cagney played Cohan in the 1942 biopic Yankee Doodle Dandy and in the 1955 film The Seven Little Foys. Cagney won the Academy Award for Best Actor for his performance in Dandy.
- Mickey Rooney played Cohan in Mr. Broadway, a television special broadcast on May 11, 1957. The same month, Rooney released a 78 RPM record featuring Rooney singing Cohan's best-known songs on the A-side.
- Joel Grey starred on Broadway as Cohan in the musical George M! (1968), which was adapted into a television special in 1970.
- Allan Sherman sang a parody-medley of three Cohan tunes on an early album: "Barry (That'll Be the Baby's Name)"; "H-o-r-o-w-i-t-z"; and "Get on the Garden Freeway" to the tune of "Mary's a Grand Old Name", "Harrigan" and "Give My Regards to Broadway", respectively.
- Chip Deffaa created a one-man show about the life of Cohan called George M. Cohan Tonight!, which first ran Off-Broadway at the Irish Repertory Theatre in 2006 with Jon Peterson as Cohan. Deffaa has written and directed five other plays about Cohan.

== Filmography ==
Cohan acted in the following films:

Year	Title	Role	Notes
1917	Broadway Jones	Broadway Jones	Lost film
1917	Seven Keys to Baldpate	George Washington Magee	
1918	Hit-The-Trail Holliday	Billie Holiday	Lost film
1932	The Phantom President	Theodore K. Blair/Peeter J. 'Doc' Varney	
1934	Gambling	Al Draper	

== Gallery ==
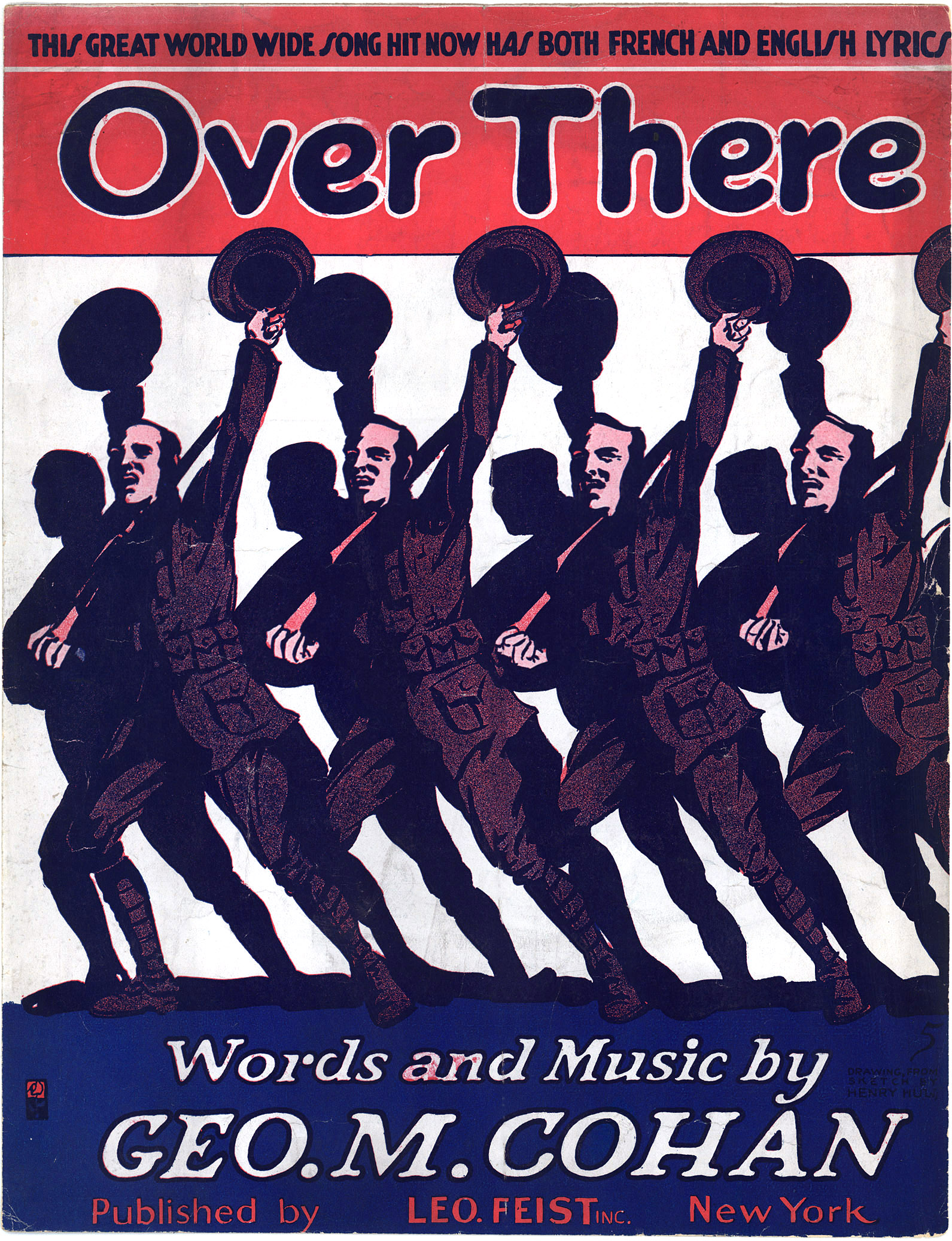
"Over There" sheet music cover, 1917

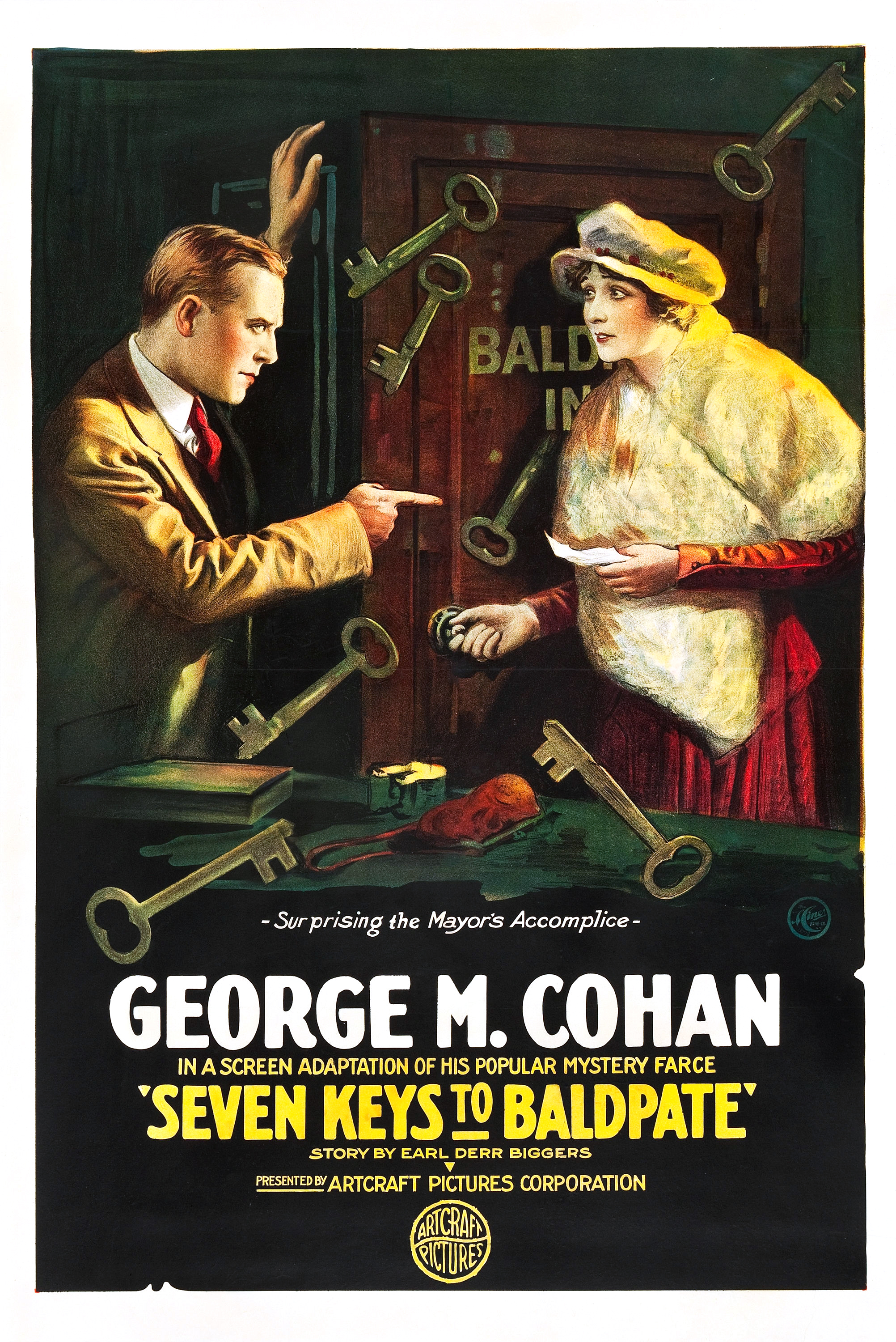
Poster for Seven Keys to Baldpate, 1917

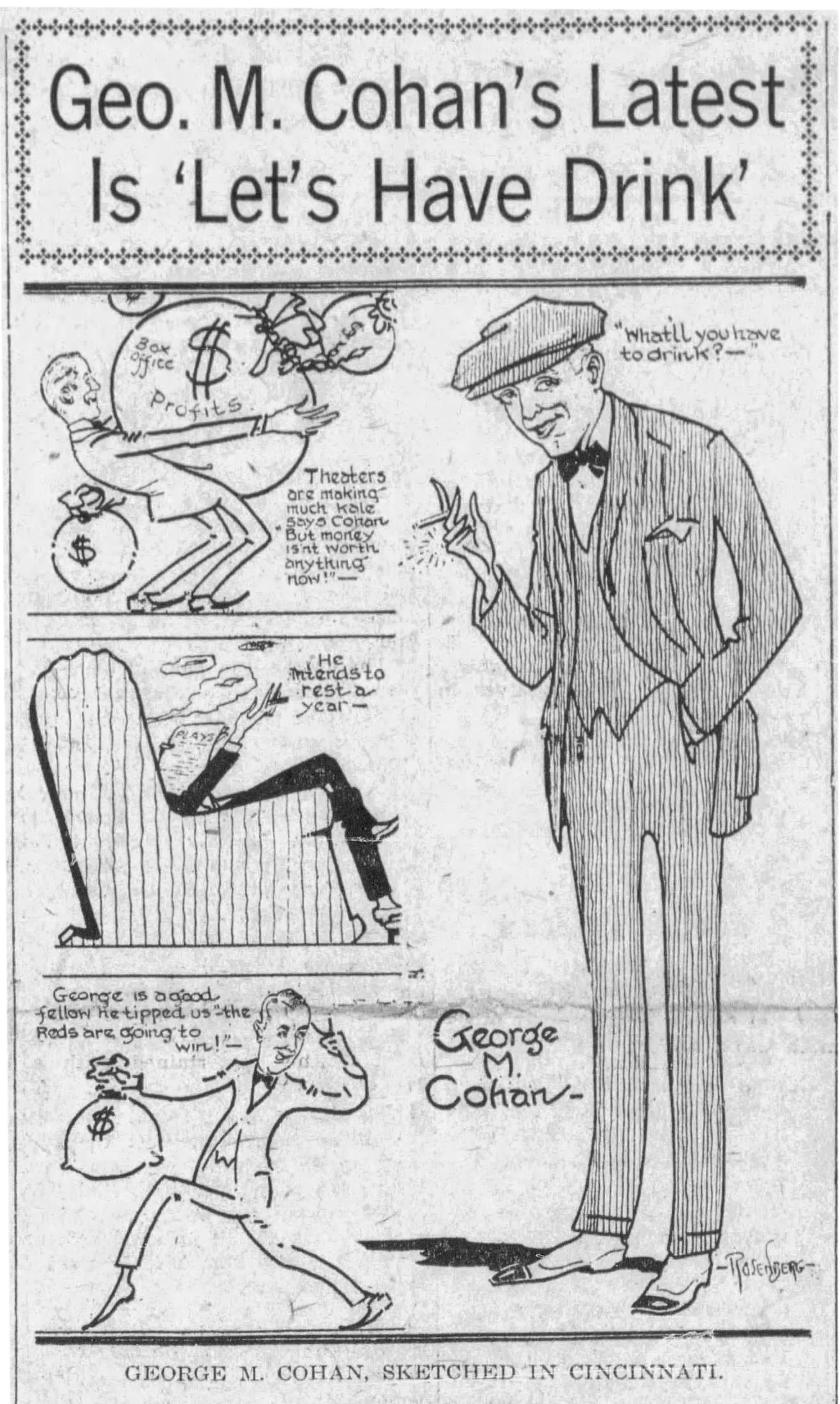
Signed drawing by Manuel Rosenberg, 1919

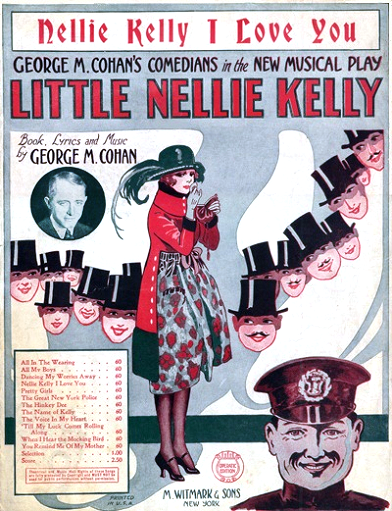
Sheet music for Little Nellie Kelly, 1922

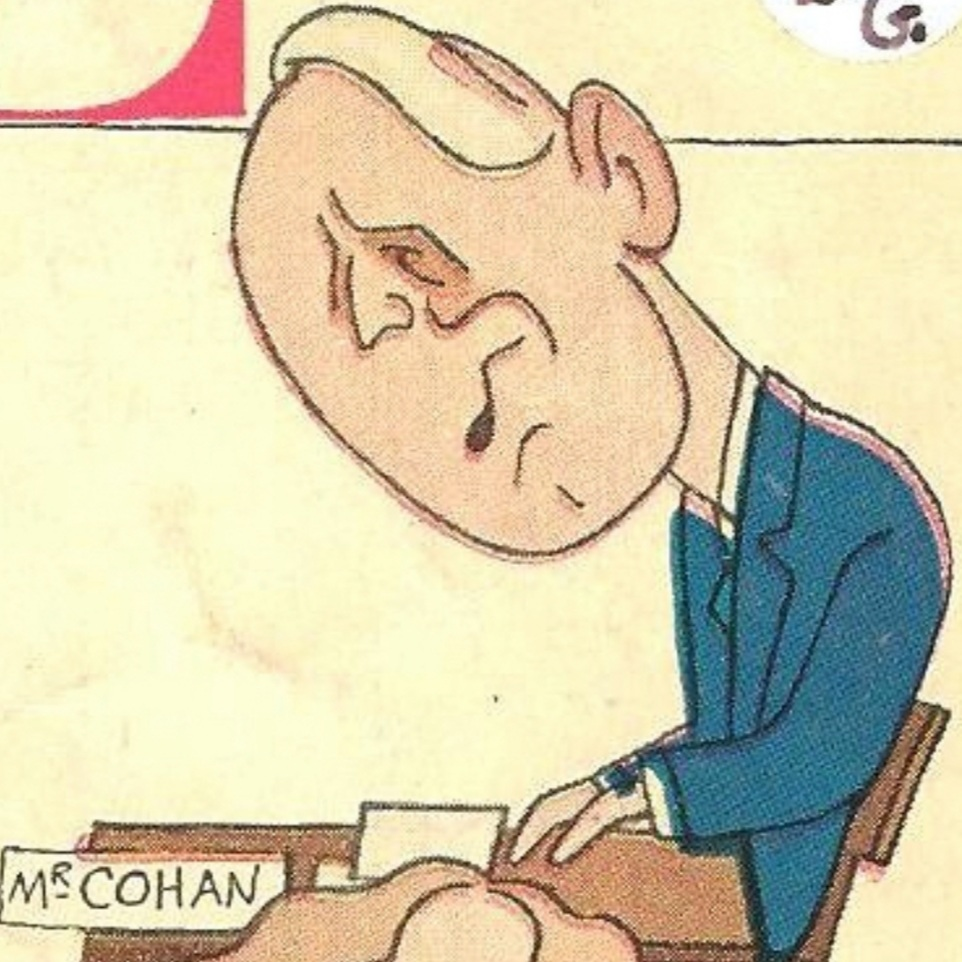
Caricature by Ralph Barton, 1925

== See also ==
- Broadway theater
- List of playwrights from the United States
- List of Songwriters Hall of Fame inductees
- Musical theater
- Tin Pan Alley
