= Desnuda (disambiguation) =

Desnuda is a seminude, topless female performer covered in body paint who poses for photos in exchange for tips in the pedestrian plaza of New York City's Times Square.

Desnuda may also refer to:

- Desnuda (album), or the title track, by Ednita Nazario, 2012
- "Desnuda" (Ricardo Arjona song), 1999
- "Desnuda" (Blanco song), 2024
