= Jonathan Bennett (actor) =

American actor and model (born 1981)

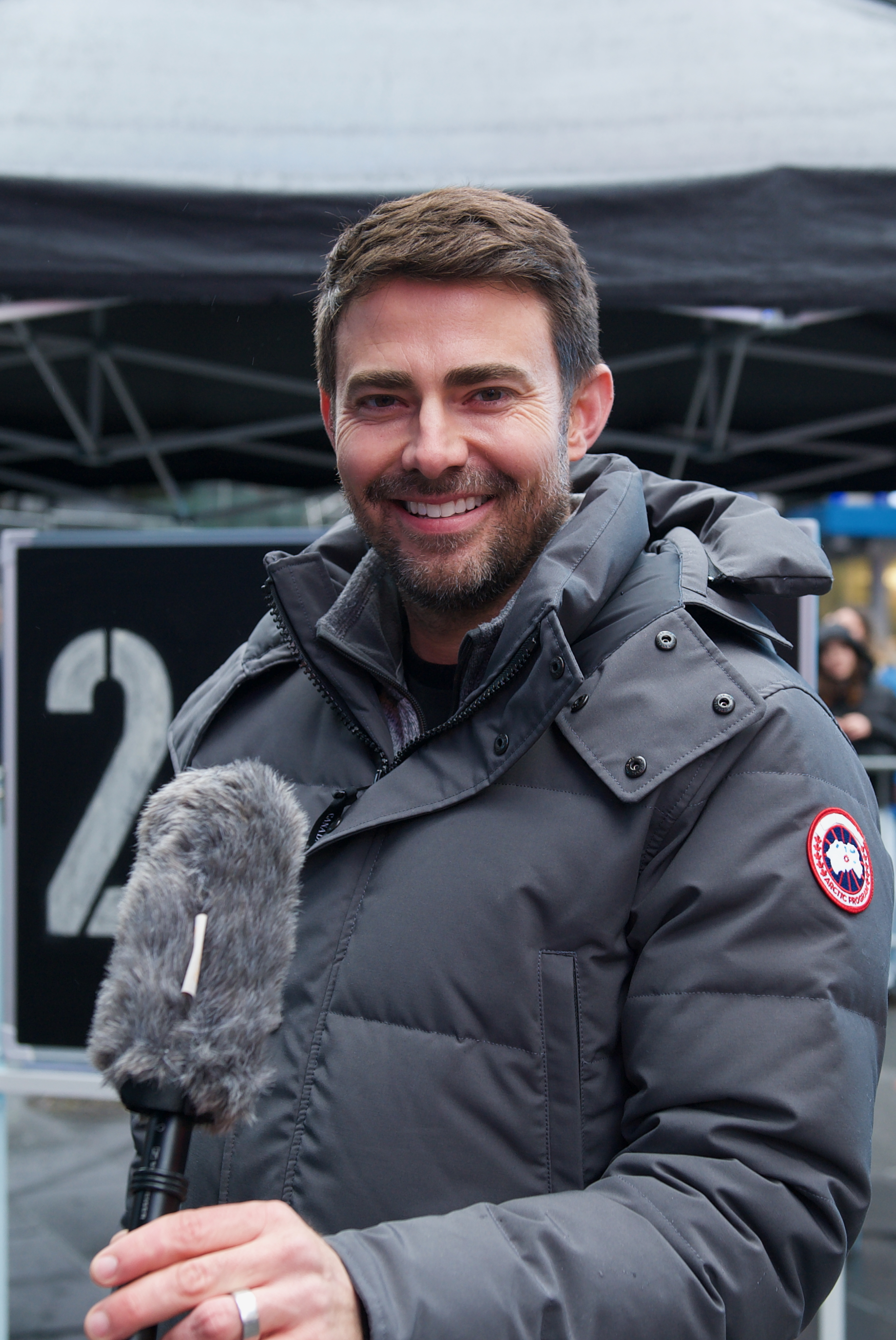
- Bennett at the 2024 Good Riddance Day in Times Square
- Born: Jonathan David Bennett; June 10, 1981 (age 45); Rossford, Ohio, U.S.
- Occupations: Actor; television host
- Years active: 2001–present
- Known for: Mean Girls; Spamalot; Van Wilder: Freshman Year
- Spouse: Jaymes Vaughan (m. 2022)

Jonathan David Bennett (born June 10, 1981) is an American actor and television host. He is known for his roles as Aaron Samuels in the 2004 comedy film Mean Girls, Bud McNulty in 2005's Cheaper by the Dozen 2, the title character in the 2009 direct-to-DVD comedy Van Wilder: Freshman Year, and his recurring role as Casey Gant in the mystery drama Veronica Mars. He is the host of the Food Network series Halloween Wars, and he previously hosted Cake Wars.

Bennett made his Broadway debut in Spamalot on January 23, 2024, playing Sir Robin, Guard 1 and Brother Maynard.

== Early life ==
Bennett was born in Ohio, to David Bennett, a physician from Toledo, and Ruthanne Bennett (née Mason). He has two half-brothers, Brian and Brent, and one half-sister, Lisa.

Bennett attended Eagle Point Elementary School in Rossford, Ohio, and graduated from Rossford High School in 1999. Bennett attended Otterbein University.

== Career ==
After moving to New York, he was cast on the ABC soap opera All My Children as JR Chandler from 2001 to 2002. Since then, he has appeared in various television dramas, including Law & Order: Special Victims Unit, Smallville, and Veronica Mars.

Bennett co-starred in the 2004 comedy movie Mean Girls as Aaron Samuels, the love interest of star Lindsay Lohan's character. In 2005, he co-starred in the family comedy movie Cheaper by the Dozen 2 and the romantic comedy movie Lovewrecked. In 2007, Bennett appeared in the direct-to-video prequel TV series The Dukes of Hazzard: The Beginning, in which he played Bo Duke. In 2009, he starred as the title character in Van Wilder: Freshman Year, and appeared as Nick in the Hallmark original movie Elevator Girl.

On September 4, 2014, Bennett was announced as one of the celebrities competing on the 19th season of Dancing with the Stars. He was paired with professional dancer Allison Holker. Bennett and Holker were eliminated on Week 6 of the competition and finished in 9th place.

From 2015 to 2017, Bennett hosted the Food Network cooking competition show Cake Wars.

In 2016, Bennett played gay sports agent Lucas in two episodes of Hit the Floor.

In 2018, with celebrity chef Nikki Martin, he released a pop culture cookbook titled The Burn CookBook.

In 2019, he was featured in the filmed poem rendition Love Goes Never Alone, in support of the LGBT+ community, for the online theatre publication First Night Magazine, performing next to other film, television and theatre celebrities such as Stephen Fry, Alan Menken, Stephen Schwartz, Debra Messing, Neil Gaiman, and Sharon Osbourne.

On January 13, 2019, it was announced that Bennett would be a HouseGuest on the second season of the reality competition show Celebrity Big Brother.

In 2021, Bennet played Jesus Christ - as an imaginary best friend to the eponymous Russian boy in Wes Hurley's Potato Dreams of America.

In 2022, Bennett starred in the first LGBTQ-led Hallmark Channel Christmas film, The Holiday Sitter.

Bennett and husband Jaymes Vaughan appeared together on the July 8, 2022, wedding-themed episode of Trixie Motel entitled "Oh Honeymoon". They provide support and advice to the groom-to-be. In 2024, Bennett was announced as the host and the main judge of Hallmark's reality series Finding Mr. Christmas, which premiered on October 31, 2024.

On April 16, 2026, it was announced that Bennett had been cast as Joe Fitzpatrick in the ABC soap opera General Hospital.

== Personal life ==
On November 30, 2020, representatives for Bennett confirmed he was engaged to The Amazing Race contestant and current Celebrity Page host Jaymes Vaughan, who proposed on the set for The Christmas House with an original song. In 2021, Bennett and Vaughan became the first gay couple to appear on the cover of the magazine The Knot. In March 2022, the couple got married at the Unico Riviera Maya Hotel in Mexico.

Bennett's mother Ruthanne died November 30, 2012, aged 67. His father, David, died on April 28, 2014, aged 73.

== Filmography ==
=== Film ===
Year	Title	Role	Notes
2003	Season of Youth	Taylor	Palm Beach International Film Festival Award for Best Actor
2004	Mean Girls	Aaron Samuels	Nominated — Teen Choice Award for Choice Movie Chemistry (shared with Lindsay Lohan); Nominated — Teen Choice Award for Choice Breakout Movie Star - Male
2005	Love Wrecked	Ryan Howell	
2005	Cheaper by the Dozen 2	Bud McNulty	
2006	Bachelor Party Vegas	Nathan	
2009	The Assistants	Zack Cooper	
2009	Van Wilder: Freshman Year	Van Wilder	
2010	Morning Glory	Himself	Uncredited cameo
2012	Memorial Day	SSgt Kyle Vogel	
2012	Music High	Jasper "Jazz" Poland	
2012	Divorce Invitation	Michael	Remake of 1997 Indian Telugu movie Aahwaanam
2012	Slightly Single in L.A.	Seven	
2012	Christmas Crush	Ben	
2013	Pawn	Aaron	Also executive producer
2013	Anything Is Possible	George	
2013	The Secret Village	Greg	
2013	Misogynist	Harrison	Nominated – Los Angeles International Underground Film Festival LAIUFF Award for Best Actor also co-producer
2014	Authors Anonymous	William Bruce	Also executive producer
2014	Mining for Ruby	Andrew	
2014	A Christmas Kiss II	Sebastian	
2015	Paid in Full	Jack	
2015	Cats Dancing on Jupiter	Ben Cross	
2015	A Dogwalker's Christmas Tale	Dean Stanton	
2016	Submerged	Matt	
2016	Do Over	Anthony Campana	
2016	Romantically Speaking	Nathan	
2016	Deadly Retreat	Mike	
2016	Do You Take This Man	Christopher	Also co-producer
2017	Bride to Be	Danny	
2019	The Haunting of Sharon Tate	Jay Sebring	
2019	Love on Repeat	Kevin	
2021	Potato Dreams of America	Jesus Christ	
2023	Snow Falls	Jace	
2023	Fire Island	Rafael	
2023	The Plus One	Marshall	

=== Television ===
Year	Title	Role	Notes
2001–2002	All My Children	JR Chandler	Main role
2002	Law & Order: Special Victims Unit	Kyle Fuller	Episode: "Deception"
2003	Boston Public	Ethan Guest	Episode: "Chapter Sixty-Three"
2004–2005	Veronica Mars	Casey Gant	2 episodes
2005	Smallville	Kevin Grady	Episode: "Blank"
2005	Kathy Griffin: My Life on the D-List	Himself	Episodes: "From A to D" and "Magic Carpet Ride"
2007	The Dukes of Hazzard: The Beginning	Bo Duke	Television film
2007	Cane	Brad	Episode: "Time Away"
2010	Elevator Girl	Nick Sweeney	Television film
2012	Fred: The Show	Lash Landridge	Episode: "Freddy and the Figglettes, Part 2"
2012	Christmas Crush	Ben Oliver	Television film
2013	The Wrong Woman	Ben	Television film
2013	Police Guys	Himself	Television film
2013	The Glades	Drew Green	Episode: "Killer Barbecue"
2014	Sweet Surrender	Jerry	Television film
2014	Dancing with the Stars	Contestant	Season 19
2014	Copycat MTV	Host	
2014	A Christmas Kiss II	Sebastian	Television film
2015	Romantically Speaking	Nathan	Television film
2015	Christmas Cookie Challenge	Host	
2015–2017	Cake Wars	Host	
2016	Hit the Floor	Lucas	Episodes: "Blocked" and "Good D"
2016	Awkward	Ethan	Recurring role (Season 5)
2016	Cupcake Wars	Host	
2016–2020, 2023–present	Halloween Wars	Host	
2017	Love at First Glance	Victor	Television film
2018	The Last Sharknado: It's About Time	Billy the Kid	Television film
2018	Christmas Made to Order	Steven	Television film
2018–2019	Entertainment Tonight	Reporter	
2019	Celebrity Big Brother	Contestant	Season 2
2019	Supergirl	Quentin	Episode: "Stand and Deliver"
2019	Lindsay Lohan's Beach Club	Himself	Episode: "After the Show"
2019–present	Times Square Ball	Host	Annual live webcast
2020	Station 19	Michael	Episodes: "Ice Ice Baby" and "No One Is Alone"
2020	RuPaul's Drag Race	Guest judge	Episode: "Snatch Game"
2020	The Christmas House	Brandon Nock	Television film
2021	The Christmas House 2: Deck Those Halls	Brandon Nock	Television film
2022	Deadly Yoga Retreat	Remy	Television film
2022	Wedding of a Lifetime	Jake	Television film
2022	The Holiday Sitter	Sam	Television film
2023	Fantasy Island	Oliver	Episode: "Forever and a Day"
2023	Christmas on Cherry Lane	Mike	Television film
2023–present	Food Network's Battle of the Decades	Host	
2024	The Groomsmen: First Look	Danny	Television film trilogy
2024	The Groomsmen: Second Chances	Danny	Television film trilogy
2024	The Groomsmen: Last Dance	Danny	Television film trilogy
2024	Season's Greetings from Cherry Lane	Mike	Television film; sequel to "Christmas on Cherry Lane"
2024	Happy Howlidays	Troy	Television film
2024 - 2025	Finding Mr. Christmas	Host and judge	
2025	Doctor Odyssey	Matt	2 episodes
2025	A Make or Break Holiday	Restaurant manager	Television film
2025	A Keller Christmas Vacation	Dylan	Television film
2026	General Hospital	Joe Fitzpatrick	

=== Music videos ===
Year	Title	Artist	Ref.
2018	"Thank U, Next"	Ariana Grande	
