= Jaymes Vaughan =

American actor, television personality, and singer (born 1983)

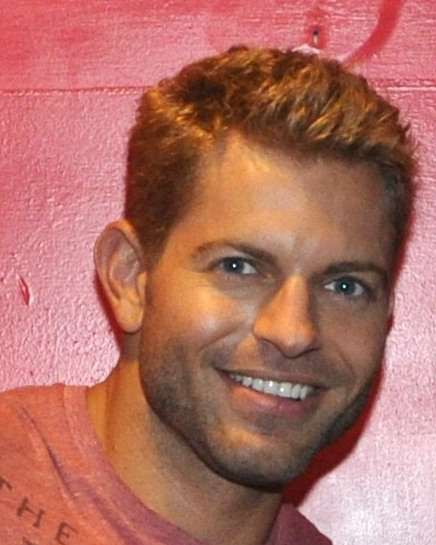
- Vaughan in 2012.
- Born: April 15, 1983 (age 43); Chesterfield County, Virginia
- Occupation: Actor · television personality · singer
- Spouse: Jonathan Bennett (m. 2022)

Jaymes Vaughan (born April 15, 1983) is an American actor, television personality, and singer. He has appeared on The Talk, Celebrity Page, The Amazing Race, and was a main cast member on The Real Friends of WeHo. Vaughan is married to actor and television personality Jonathan Bennett.

== Personal life ==
Vaughan was born in Chesterfield County, Virginia in 1983. In November 2020, he proposed to partner Jonathan Bennett with an original song titled "Our Song". They were the first gay couple to go on the cover of The Knot magazine. They got married in Mexico in March 2022, and now reside in Palm Springs, California.

== Career ==
Vaughan started his career performing in the Chippendales show in Las Vegas as the first openly-gay host. In 2012, he was the runner-up on Season 21 of The Amazing Race, alongside fellow Chippendales dancer James Davis. Two years later, Vaughan started hosting Celebrity Page and making appearances on The Talk. In 2023, he became a main cast member on the MTV series The Real Friends of WeHo.

In November 2024, Vaughan released his holiday EP Feels Like Christmas. Lead single, "Home for the Holiday" was featured on the Hallmark original movie Season’s Greetings from Cherry Lane.

== Filmography ==
Year	Title	Role	Notes
2023	The Real Friends of WeHo	Self	Main Cast Member
2023	The Plus One	Yoga Instructor	TV Movie
2022	Trixie Motel	Self	Episode: "Oh Honeymoon"
2021	Blue Call	Bartender	
2019–2021	Lorraine	Self	6 Episodes
2019	American Music Awards Red Carpet Live	Self	
2019	The Wendy Williams Show	Self	1 Episode
2019	Billboard Music Awards Red Carpet Live	Self	
2019	Celebrity Big Brother	Self	1 Episode
2018	Billboard Music Awards Red Carpet Live	Self	
2017	Chocolate City: Vegas	Adonis	
2017	Access Hollywood	Self	1 Episode
2014–2022	Celebrity Page	Self	1028 Episodes
2014–2018	The Talk	Self	37 Episodes
2014	Baby Daddy	Officer	Episode: "Strip or Treat"
2014	Reality Relapse	Self	1 Episode
2013	Marie	Self	Episode: "Daniel Goddard"
2012	The Amazing Race	Self	11 Episodes

== Discography ==
All credits are adapted from Apple Music and Spotify.

=== As lead artist ===
==== Singles ====
Year	Title	Album	Writer(s)	Producer(s)
2024	“Home for the Holiday”	Feels Like Christmas	Mark Vogel	Mark Vogel
2023	"Our Song"	Non-album single	Jaymes Vaughan, Jason Tranzer	Jason Tranzer

==== Extended plays ====
Title	Details
Feels Like Christmas	Released: November 12, 2024; Label: Self-released; Format: Digital download, streaming; Track listing: 1. "It's Beginning to Feel a Lot Like Christmas"; 2. "Home for the Holiday"; 3. "You Made It Christmas"; 4. "S.O.S. (Christmas Version)"
