= Good Riddance Day =

Unofficial holiday

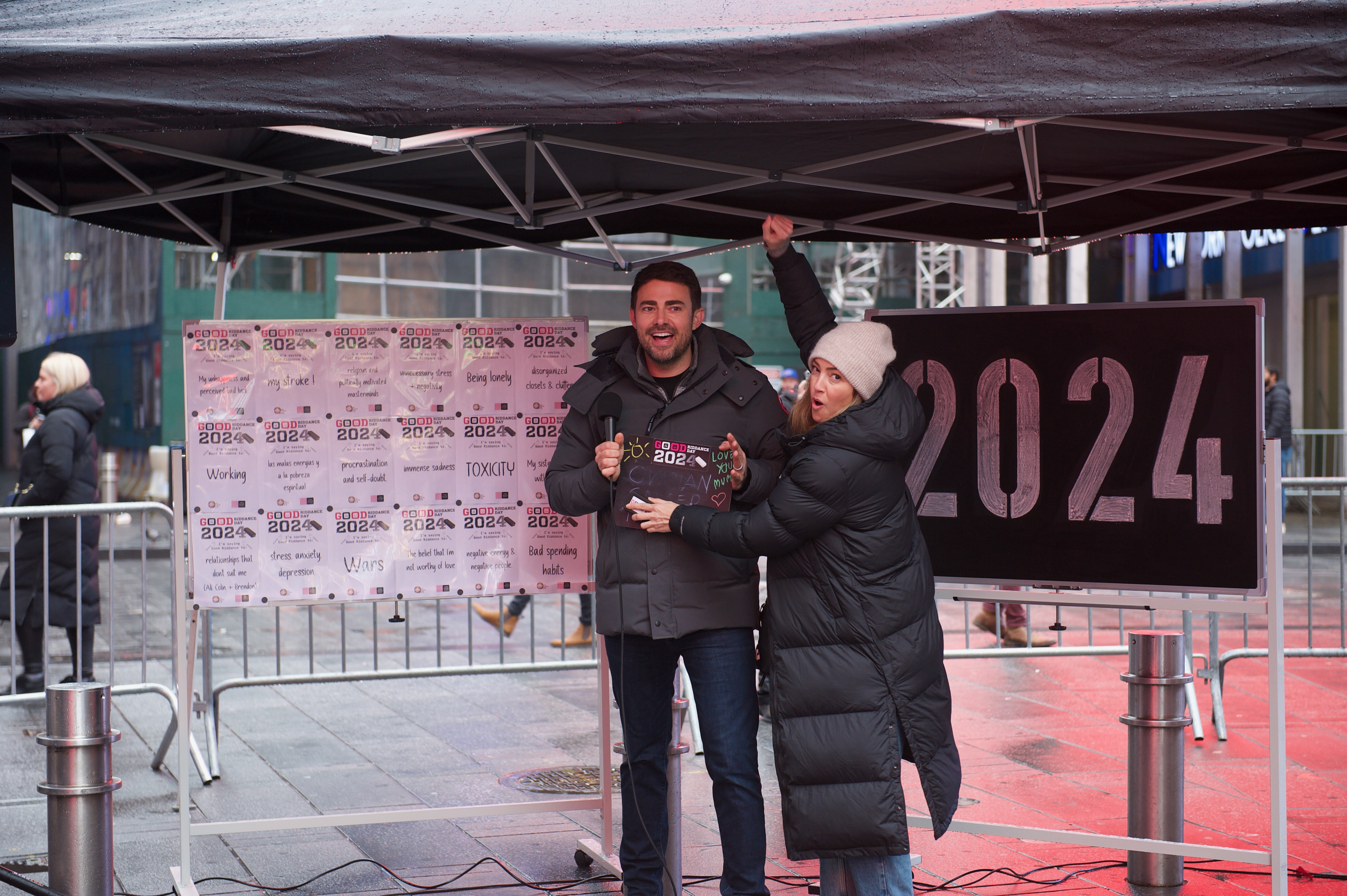
- Jonathan Bennett hosting Good Riddance Day 2024
- Significance: celebrating the departure of unwanted memories
- Date: December 28
- Next time: December 28, 2026
- Frequency: Annual
- First time: 2007
- Started by: Times Square Alliance
- Related to: New Year's Eve

Good Riddance Day is an unofficial holiday in New York City's Times Square celebrating the departure of unwanted memories, observed on December 28 since 2007. It was created by the Times Square Alliance.

== Conception ==
Good Riddance Day is inspired by a Latin American tradition in which New Years celebrators stuff dolls with objects representing bad memories before setting them on fire.
