= 2017 Times Square car attack =

Vehicle-ramming attack in New York City

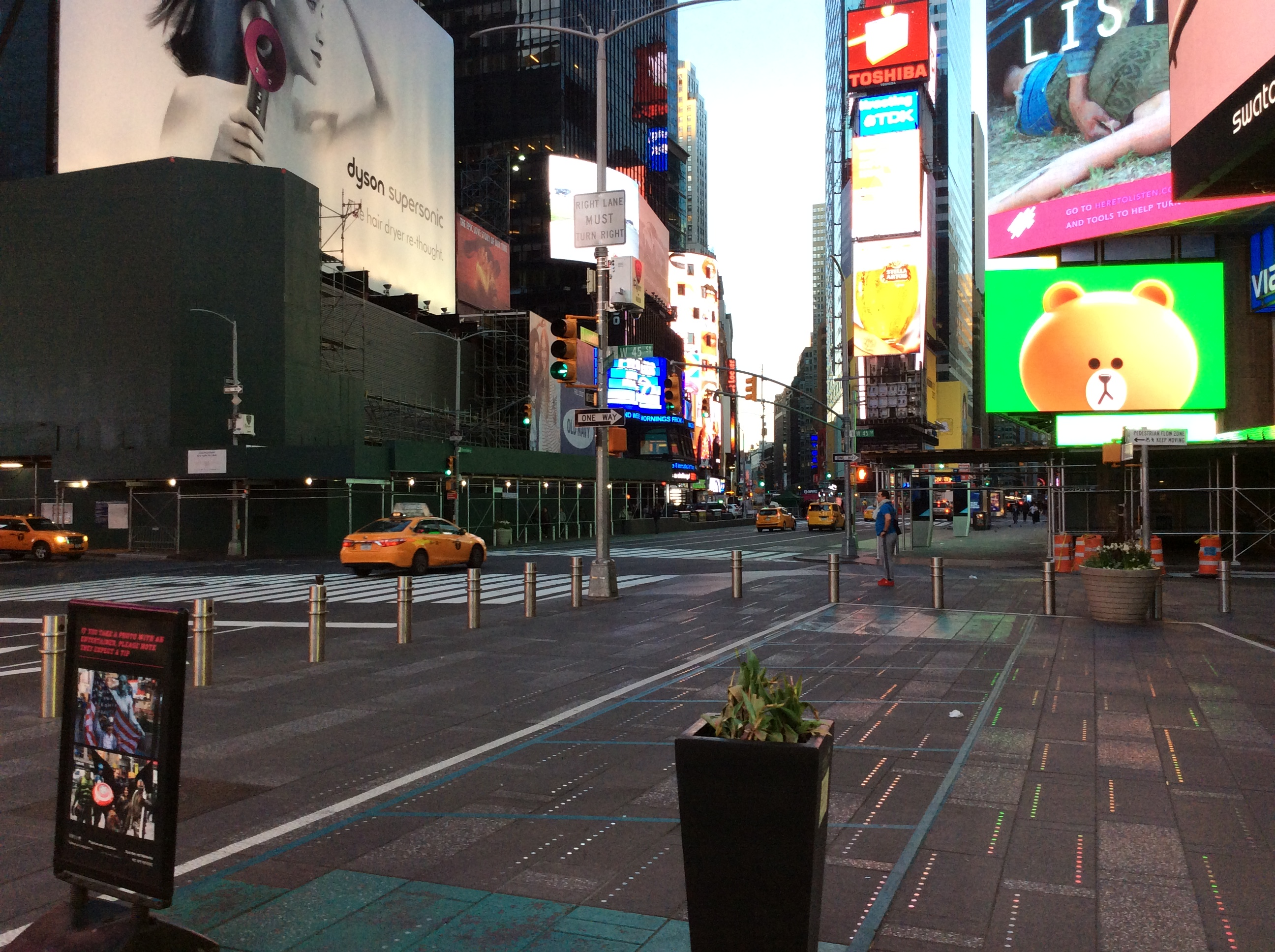
- Site of the crash in April 2017

- 2017 Times Square car attack (Manhattan) 2017 Times Square car attack (New York City) 2017 Times Square car attack (New York) 2017 Times Square car attack (the United States)
- Location: 40.757994°N 73.985574°W; Times Square, New York City, U.S.
- Date: May 18, 2017; 9 years ago 11:53 EDT
- Target: Pedestrians
- Attack type: Vehicle-ramming attack, attempted mass murder
- Weapon: Honda Accord (North America eighth generation)
- Deaths: 1
- Injuries: 20
- Accused: Richard Rojas

On May 18, 2017, a car was crashed in Times Square, New York City, United States. One person was killed and 20 were injured. Navy veteran Richard Rojas was charged with one count of second degree murder, 18 attempted murders and 38 assaults, for which he was found not responsible because of insanity.

After being detained, Rojas was found to have ingested phencyclidine before the crash. When interviewed by the NYPD, Rojas said he wanted to die in a "suicide by cop", and that he had been hearing voices. In a jailhouse news interview three days later, he said he did not remember the incident or any statements he made afterward.

A year later, multiple liability lawsuits were filed between Rojas, victims, and the city.

== Incident ==
Richard Rojas, the driver of a maroon 2009 Honda Accord, sped into pedestrians in Times Square after having jumped the sidewalk on the west side of Seventh Avenue at 42nd Street, outside the Reuters Building. He continued for three blocks before crashing into traffic bollards at the northwest corner of 45th Street and Seventh Avenue, at Broadway. As Rojas was trying to leave his car, a traffic agent tackled him and took him into custody. After having exited the car Rojas said: "I wanted to kill them," according to prosecutors.

== Victims ==
Alyssa Elsman, an 18-year-old tourist from Portage, Michigan, was killed and 20 people were injured, four critically.

== Suspect ==
Richard Rojas (born 1991), a 26-year-old resident of the Bronx and a military veteran, was arrested and charged after the crash. He previously served in the United States Navy and had two prior arrests for driving under the influence. These arrests came in 2008 and 2015. He enlisted in the Navy in 2011 and was an electrician's mate fireman apprentice. In 2012, he served aboard the destroyer USS Carney. He was most recently based at Naval Air Station Jacksonville and was discharged in 2014.

Rojas was arrested in September 2012 after assaulting a cab driver and yelling at an officer, "My life is over", and threatening to kill police officers after his release. He also spent two months in military prison in 2013. A neighbor said his family was Dominican. One of his friends said Rojas had developed a drinking problem after his military service, using it as medication for his "dark thoughts and moods", and posted what the friend described as "demonic" content on social media. According to authorities and his friends, his mental health issues dated back to his childhood though he never sought psychiatric care, becoming more paranoid and increasing his intake of marijuana and alcohol.

Rojas was obsessed with Scientology and had accumulated literature on the religion. He recently got back his car after it was repossessed a short time before the incident. A week before the incident, he was arrested and charged with pointing a knife at a notary, whom he accused of stealing his identity.

Investigators looked into his psychological history. In an interview for the New York Post on May 21, he said he had no recollection of the incident or any statements he made when arrested and sought help in the prior week, including speaking to a mental health counselor at a veteran's affairs center, who promised to call him on Monday (May 22).

== Aftermath ==
Bill de Blasio, the Mayor of New York City, and other officials have said there is no indication the incident was an act of terrorism. Several law enforcement officials said the suspect thought he was hearing voices and expected to die. Rojas tested negative for alcohol, but additional testing was done to determine whether he was taking any drugs. The drug test came back as positive while blood tests were conducted for whether he had taken synthetic marijuana or PCP. Rojas has since offered alternative explanations to the investigators who said they hadn't come to any conclusions.

According to a criminal complaint, Rojas admitted smoking marijuana laced with PCP before driving the car. Prosecutors said he told the police he wanted to die by suicide by cop. He also rambled that he had been hearing voices and it was the last day on Earth. According to other sources, he said he claimed to hear voices telling him the police were going to kill him. Later, they said he had tested positive for PCP and told police God made him do it. His interview was said to be abnormal and rambling.

== Legal proceedings ==
Rojas was later charged with second-degree murder, 20 counts of attempted murder, and five counts of aggravated vehicular homicide. On July 13, Rojas, through his lawyer, Enrico DeMarco, pleaded not guilty to two counts of second-degree murder, 18 attempted murders and 38 assaults.

On October 24, DeMarco declined to reveal whether he would attempt an insanity defense, saying he needed "another month or so" to examine Rojas' possessions, such as notebooks, which the district attorney possesses. Justice Melissa Jackson urged him to hurry before adjourning until December 18. On December 17, he filed notice of his intent to pursue an insanity defense. Rojas was examined by psychiatrists hired by both sides. Jury selection began on April 18, 2022, five years after the attack. If Rojas was convicted of all charges, he would have faced a life sentence.

Defense psychiatrist Dr. Ziv Cohen from Weill Cornell Medicine at Columbia University testified that Rojas had schizophrenia, and had begun hearing voices while in the navy. Cohen testified that "At a certain point, the psychosis becomes so severe that he can't control his behavior anymore." It was one of these voices that told Rojas on the day of the attack to crash his car. On June 22, the jury found Rojas not responsible because of insanity.

=== Civil action ===
In June 2017, attorney Greg Sobo of Sobo & Sobo L.L.P. was hired to represent Alyssa and her father Thomas Elsman, as well as several other relatives and survivors of the incident in a case against Rojas. In July 2018, Sobo filed a second claim against New York City for unspecified damages, alleging that the city failed to provide adequate protection from civilian attacks. The claimants include Thomas Elsman, as well as victims Gayatari Jariwala, William McCollough, Destiny Lightfoot, and Caroline Jacobs. The next month, victims Jessica Williams and William Nelson Sr. filed a similar joint suit for $75 million.

Rojas was also named as a defendant against the city. He countersued the plaintiffs, blaming their injuries on their own culpable conduct, and holding their respective insurance companies solely responsible for paying their expenses. He agreed with their claim that the city was recklessly negligent, and sued it accordingly.

== See also ==
- 2010 Times Square car bombing attempt
- 2017 New York City Subway bombing
