= Memorial Day (2012 film) =

- Release poster
- Directed by: Sam Fischer
- Written by: Marc Conklin
- Produced by: Craig Christiansen
- Starring: Jonathan Bennett; James Cromwell; John Cromwell
- Cinematography: Bo Hakala
- Edited by: Bill Rammer
- Music by: Paul Hartwig
- Production company: Perspective Films
- Distributed by: Image Entertainment
- Release dates: April 21, 2012 (Minneapolis-St. Paul); May 29, 2012 (United States)
- Running time: 104 minutes
- Country: United States
- Language: English
- Budget: $4,200,000

Memorial Day is a 2012 war film starring James Cromwell, Jonathan Bennett and John Cromwell, directed by Sam Fischer and written by Marc Conklin.

== Plot ==
The film tells the story of two soldiers from a German American family: Kyle Vogel who serves with the 34th Infantry Division in Iraq in 2005 and his grandfather Bud Vogel (James Cromwell) who serves with the 82nd Airborne Division in Western Europe in World War II.

They connect on Memorial Day 1993, when the 13-year-old Kyle finds his grandfather's footlocker during a game of hide and seek. Kyle strikes a deal with his grandfather to tell the stories behind any three objects he picks out of the footlocker, and the film proceeds to flash back to Bud's combat experience, interspersed with Kyle's experiences in Iraq.

The three objects that young Kyle picks:

- A Walther P38 Bud took from an SS officer
- A fragment of a Stielhandgranate removed from Bud's back
- A picture of Bud with his friend Sgt. Jack O'Hara

== Cast ==
- Jonathan Bennett as staff sergeant Kyle Vogel
  - Jackson Bond as young Kyle Vogel
- James Cromwell as Bud Vogel, Kyle's grandfather
  - John Cromwell as young Lieutenant Bud Vogel
- Aaron Courteau as Frankie Califano, a soldier in Bud's platoon
- Sean Dooley as Bud's platooon sergeant Jack O'Hara
- Mary Kay Fortier-Spalding as Betty Vogel, Kyle's grandmother

== Production ==
James Cromwell's son, John Cromwell, plays the young LT Bud Vogel of WWII.
