= Mining for Ruby =

- Film poster
- Directed by: Laura Zoe Quist
- Written by: Daniel Ponickly
- Story by: Daniel Ponickly
- Produced by: Daniel Lawrence Abrams; Daniel Ponickly; Laura Zoe Quist
- Starring: Antoinette Kalaj; Jonathan Bennett; Daniel Ponickly; Mischa Barton; Billy Zane
- Cinematography: Stephen Paar
- Edited by: Danya Joseph
- Music by: Toly Ramirez
- Release date: January 2, 2017
- Running time: 95 minutes
- Country: United States
- Language: English

Mining for Ruby is a 2017 American independent romantic drama film directed by Laura Zoe Quist and starring Antoinette Kalaj, Jonathan Bennett, Daniel Ponickly, Mischa Barton and Billy Zane.

== Cast ==
- Billy Zane as Professor Sam Goodwell
- Mischa Barton as Jessica King
- Jonathan Bennett as Andrew
- Antoinette Kalaj as Ruby
- Syd Wilder as Carla
- Jessie Cohen as Alex
- Jessica Rothert as Alex’s Friend
- Daniel Ponickly as Jack
- Thom Van Dorp as Gun Store Clerk

== Production ==
The film was shot in Fairbanks, Alaska.
