= Naked Cowboy =

American street performer (born 1970)

- Burck in 2026
- Born: Robert John Burck; December 23, 1970 (age 55); Cincinnati, Ohio, U.S.
- Occupations: Singer, songwriter, writer, former political candidate, actor
- Years active: 1998–present
- Spouse(s): Patricia Burck, The Naked Cowgirl (m. 2013; div. 2026)
- Website: nakedcowboy.com

Robert John Burck (born December 23, 1970), better known as the Naked Cowboy, is an American street performer who regularly sings in New York City's Times Square. He is also a regular in the streets of the French Quarter during the New Orleans Mardi Gras season. He wears only cowboy boots, a hat, and white briefs, with a guitar strategically placed to give the illusion of nudity.

In October 2010, Burck formally announced that he was running for president of the United States in the 2012 U.S. election as a candidate representing the U.S. Tea Party movement.

== Life and career ==
Burck was born in Cincinnati, Ohio, and attended Our Lady of the Rosary elementary school in nearby Greenhills, Ohio. He later earned a bachelor's degree in political science from the University of Cincinnati College of Arts and Sciences in 1995. He began busking in December 1997, and first appeared on Venice Beach, Los Angeles.

He is widely known as a fixture of Times Square in New York City, where he has appeared almost daily since September 1999. He made an appearance in Donnybrook, Dublin, Ireland, on January 25, 2009, where he performed his theme song "I'm the Naked Cowboy" at a Leinster Rugby game before 18,000 spectators. In May 2014, Burck temporarily switched from his usual briefs to boxer briefs, after being sponsored by Fruit of the Loom.

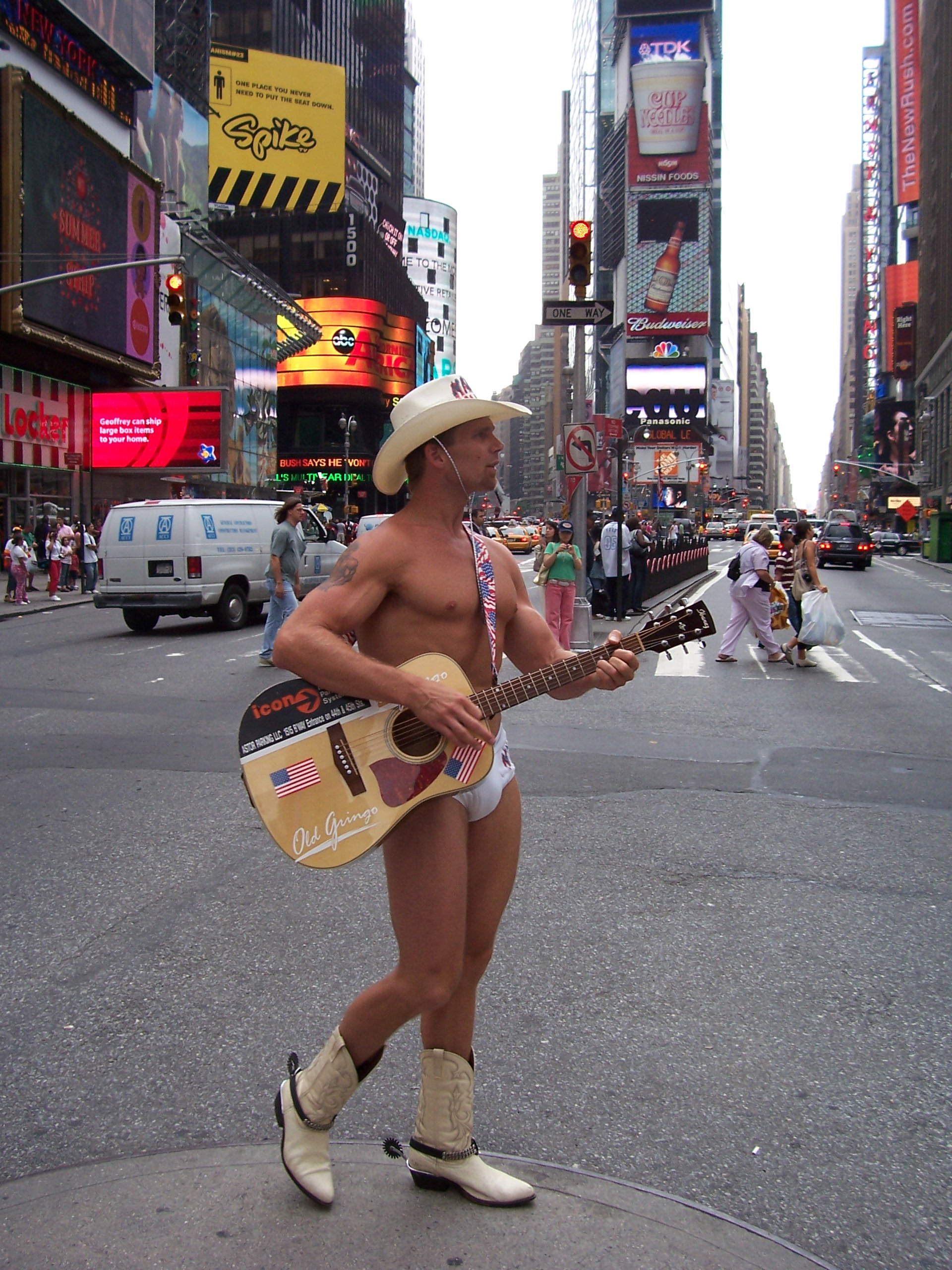
Burck performing in Times Square in 2005

On November 11, 2020, while Burck was performing in New York in front of a few tourists, a person pulled down and ripped his briefs.

=== Music ===
Burck has made appearances in three music videos, including Cake's "Short Skirt/Long Jacket", Tyler Hilton's "When It Comes", and Nickelback's "Rockstar". In 2007, Burck released an album of his own, signing to 4Sight Music Productions and recording the pop-rock album Year of the Cowboy produced by Lee Evans and Dante Lattanzi at JAMBOX Recording Studios in New York City. The album was featured on MTV News.

=== Politics ===
On July 20, 2009, it was announced that Burck would challenge Mayor Michael Bloomberg in the 2009 New York City mayoral election. In response, Jonny Porkpie, the self-proclaimed "burlesque Mayor of NYC", announced that he would run against him.

On September 29, 2010, Burck announced his intentions to challenge President Barack Obama in the 2012 presidential election. At his announcement, he stated that he has a "very conservative policy" and that he had an "unapologetic commitment to our borders, our language and our culture", borrowing a well-known catchphrase of radio host Michael Savage. He changed his appearance by wearing a dress suit and had his hair cut. On October 6, 2010, Burck officially declared his presidential candidacy at a press conference in Times Square. He stated that he was neither a Democrat nor a Republican, but rather "an American" and that he intended to lead the U.S. Tea Party movement into the Oval Office.

Bloomberg referenced the Naked Cowboy during the tenth 2020 Democratic primary debate in Charleston, South Carolina, on February 25, 2020. When asked whether he would support expanding his signature soda ban policy nationwide, Bloomberg stated that what is right for one city is not necessarily right for every city, "otherwise every town would have a Naked Cowboy."

According to The Wall Street Journal in December 2020, Burck is "a big Trump supporter." He participated in a rally in Washington, D.C., prior to the storming of the United States Capitol on January 6, 2021.

== Infringement lawsuits filed ==
=== Mars Inc. ===
Mars, Incorporated created a short animation of the Blue M&M's character playing a guitar while dressed in a white cowboy hat, cowboy boots and underpants on the electronic animation display that hangs outside the M&M's store at Times Square. Burck, who owns registered trademarks to the Naked Cowboy name and likeness, filed a trademark infringement lawsuit against Mars Incorporated on February 15, 2008.

Burck alleged that the ads infringe on his trademark by "using his likeness, persona, and image for commercial purposes without his written permission and by falsely suggesting that he endorses M&M's candy." The Cowboy's lawsuit, filed in federal court in Manhattan, requested an injunction stopping Mars from using the Naked Cowboy's likeness to advertise M&M's products, up to $100 million in punitive damages, and attorney's fees. On June 23, 2008, the court issued a decision that dismissed a portion of the suit relying on New York law but rejected a motion by the defendants to dismiss the trademark claims. Burck and Mars Incorporated settled the lawsuit in November 2008, the terms of which were not disclosed.

=== CBS ===
Burck filed a trademark infringement lawsuit against CBS in February 2011, saying the network's use of a Naked Cowboy-like figure in an ad for a television show demeaned his image with CBS's "drunk and sexually charged" portrayal of his likeness.

== Personal life ==
On February 15, 2013, Burck married Patricia Burck from Mexico City. A professional belly dancer and group fitness instructor, she is also a licensed Naked Cowgirl franchisee. They divorced in 2026.

Burck is a resident of Queens.

=== Arrest ===
On March 6, 2021, Burck was arrested in Daytona Beach, Florida, where he was appearing at Daytona Beach Bike Week. He was arrested on charges of panhandling and resisting an officer without violence, as his act violated Daytona Beach's panhandling policies. After spending a night in jail, Burck entered a plea of no contest to the resisting an officer without violence charge.

Following his plea, the judge involved in Burck's case withheld adjudication on the resisting arrest charge, making it not appear as a conviction on his criminal record, dropped the panhandling charge, and sentenced Burck to time served. Following his release, Burck reportedly received a "hero's welcome" from attendees at Daytona Beach Bike Week after he returned, and a local music store, along with Takamine, donated him a new acoustic guitar to replace the one that was damaged during his arrest. In May 2021, it was reported that Burck had asked a judge to allow him to withdraw his no contest plea and that his attorney sent a letter stating that he plans to sue the Daytona Beach Police Department over the arrest. On July 20, 2022, Burck, having sued the city and the two arresting police officers, received a $90,000 settlement.

== See also ==
- Desnuda
- Leslie Cochran
- Andrew Martinez
- Jim Spagg
- David Zancai
