= The Real Friends of WeHo =

California-based reality television series in the United States

- Genre: Reality television
- Starring: Brad Goreski; Todrick Hall; Jaymes Vaughan; Curtis Hamilton; Dorion Renaud; Joey Zauzig
- Country of origin: United States
- Original language: English
- No. of seasons: 1
- No. of episodes: 6

Production
- Executive producers: Camilo Valdes; Glen Gottlieb; Glenda Hersh; Jessica Zalkind; Julie "Bob" Lombardi; Kenny Loeliger-Myers; Lauren Eskelin; Michelle Schiefen; Steven Weinstock; Todd Radnitz
- Production company: Truly Original

Original release
- Network: MTV
- Release: January 20 – February 24, 2023

The Real Friends of WeHo is an American reality television series that premiered on January 20, 2023, on MTV.

== Background ==
A small teaser of the series was released by MTV, on January 5, 2023, showcasing six costars living in West Hollywood, California. The series features Brad Goreski, a judge from Canada's Drag Race; Todrick Hall, a choreographer and internet personality; Dorion Renaud, founder and current CEO of Buttah Skin; Curtis Hamilton, known from television series Insecure; Joey Zauzig, a social media influencer; and Jaymes Vaughan, a television host.

== Cast ==
- Brad Goreski
- Todrick Hall
- Jaymes Vaughan
- Curtis Hamilton
- Dorion Renaud
- Joey Zauzig
- Jorge Abramovs

== Episodes ==
No.	Title	Original release date	US viewers (millions)
1	"Six Degrees of West Hollywood"	January 20, 2023	0.186
2	"Thank You for Being a Friend"	January 27, 2023	0.169
3	"Wigging Out"	February 3, 2023	0.150
4	"Palm Springs Shade"	February 10, 2023	0.130
5	"Family Matters"	February 17, 2023	0.189
6	"He Said, He Said"	February 24, 2023	0.185

== Reception ==
The reception of the show following the release of the first episode was overwhelmingly negative.

The show has been criticized for its stereotypical and unrealistic representation of the gay community. Critic Coleman Spide of The Daily Beast called the show "a colossal gay nightmare" and described it as a "sad amalgamation of six arrogant gay men who would rather spend time talking about themselves than try to make good TV." Lawrence Yee of TheWrap called The Real Friends of Weho a "show we don't need about people we don't need to see more of" and pointed out its lack of diversity. While ensuring "equal parity between white and Black castmates," Yee notes "there's nary a Latin or Asian person (...) or trans person."

Further criticism of the series came from the viewers of RuPaul's Drag Race who argued that the recent season's runtime had been shortened from "60 minutes to 40 (without ads) in order to make room" for the reality series.

Shortly after the show began airing, castmate Dorion Renaud was critical of the series in an interview. "They promoted the show as 6 gay men living in West Hollywood who are friends, first I don't live in West Hollywood, I live in the valley, I love the valley. I never go to West Hollywood, I'm not in that scene. Aside from Curtis I wasn't friends with any of the cast. I also have never confirmed or talked about my sexuality. I felt betrayed because they have me identifying as something I'm not. I'm Dorion Renaud." Renaud claimed he was told that the series would be a reboot of The A-List: New York titled The A-List: LA, and that it would be a Paramount+ exclusive which would focus primarily on his business. Renaud said that he would not have agreed to appear on the show had he known it would be on MTV.
