= Sonia Isabelle =

American host of Celebrity Page

Sonia Isabelle is an American host of Celebrity Page, a nationally syndicated TV Magazine show on Reelz.

== Career ==
Isabelle worked for News 8 (WTNH) in Connecticut from December 2002 to November 2013 where, as Sonia Baghdady, she anchored the weekday evening shows "News 8 at 5, 5:30 and 11pm".

Before joining WTNH, she was an anchor and reporter for WWLP in Springfield, Massachusetts, and a reporter for a Long Island News 12 affiliate.

== Awards ==
She earned an Emmy Award for "Outstanding Achievement in Soft News Series," an Emmy nomination for "Outstanding Service Report," and two Associated Press Awards. She was also nominated in 2008 for an Emmy award for "Outstanding Achievement" as an anchor.

The New Haven Business times recently listed Sonia as one of "20 Noteworthy Women" in the community. She was also voted best local TV reporter in the state by the readers of "Connecticut Magazine" and as one of the top local TV personalities by the New Haven Advocate.
