= Celebrity Page =

U.S. celebrity TV series

- Genre: Entertainment and celebrity/News magazine
- Presented by: Sonia Isabelle; Jaymes Vaughan
- Country of origin: United States
- Original language: English
- No. of seasons: 5

Production
- Executive producers: Mark Berryhill; James Lisi
- Running time: 22 to 24 minutes
- Production company: Unconventional Partners

Original release
- Network: Syndication; Reelz
- Release: September 9, 2013 – present

Celebrity Page (formerly OK!TV, that is based on the magazine of the same name) is an American syndicated entertainment news program. The series is co-produced with Dotdash Meredith (formerly OK! American parent company American Media), Unconventional Partners, and Trifecta Entertainment & Media. The series premiered on September 9, 2013.

On March 15, 2016, Trifecta announced that the series would be renamed Celebrity Page as a result of changing its partnership from American Media's OK! magazine to Meredith Corporation, which returned to producing content for syndication ten months after the Better Show was canceled. The change took effect on March 28, 2016.

== Details ==
The series focuses on pop culture, celebrity news, gossip and lifestyle stories, some sourced formerly through Meredith's television stations (which went to Gray Television in 2021) and magazine resources (though not those of the former Time Inc., including People and Entertainment Weekly; Meredith completed their purchase of Time Inc. in January 2018, but those magazines have their own platforms and content agreements), along with Soap Opera Digest. The program is co-hosted by Sonia Isabelle in New York and Jaymes Vaughan in Los Angeles.
