= Desnuda =

Painted topless female performer in New York City

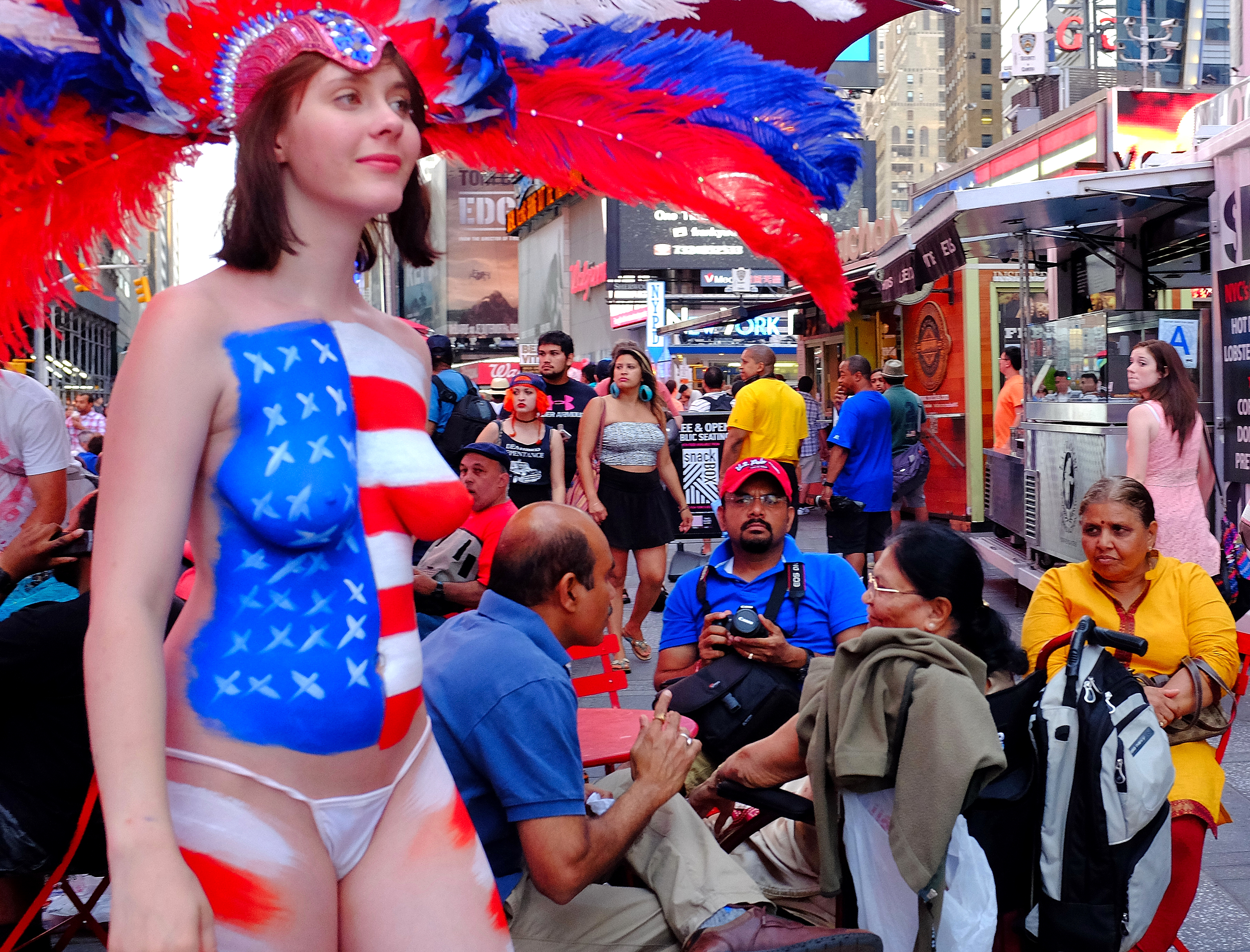
Desnuda in Times Square

A desnuda is a seminude, topless female performer covered in body paint who poses for photos in exchange for tips in the pedestrian plaza of New York City's Times Square. The desnudas typically wear thong underwear and high heels, and use red, white, and blue body paint to emulate the colors of the American flag. The performers are primarily Latina. In Spanish, desnuda means naked.

Desnudas reportedly first appeared in Times Square in the summer of 2013.

== See also ==
- Topfreedom
- Holly Van Voast
- Naked Cowboy
