= Times Square =

Intersection and area in Manhattan, New York

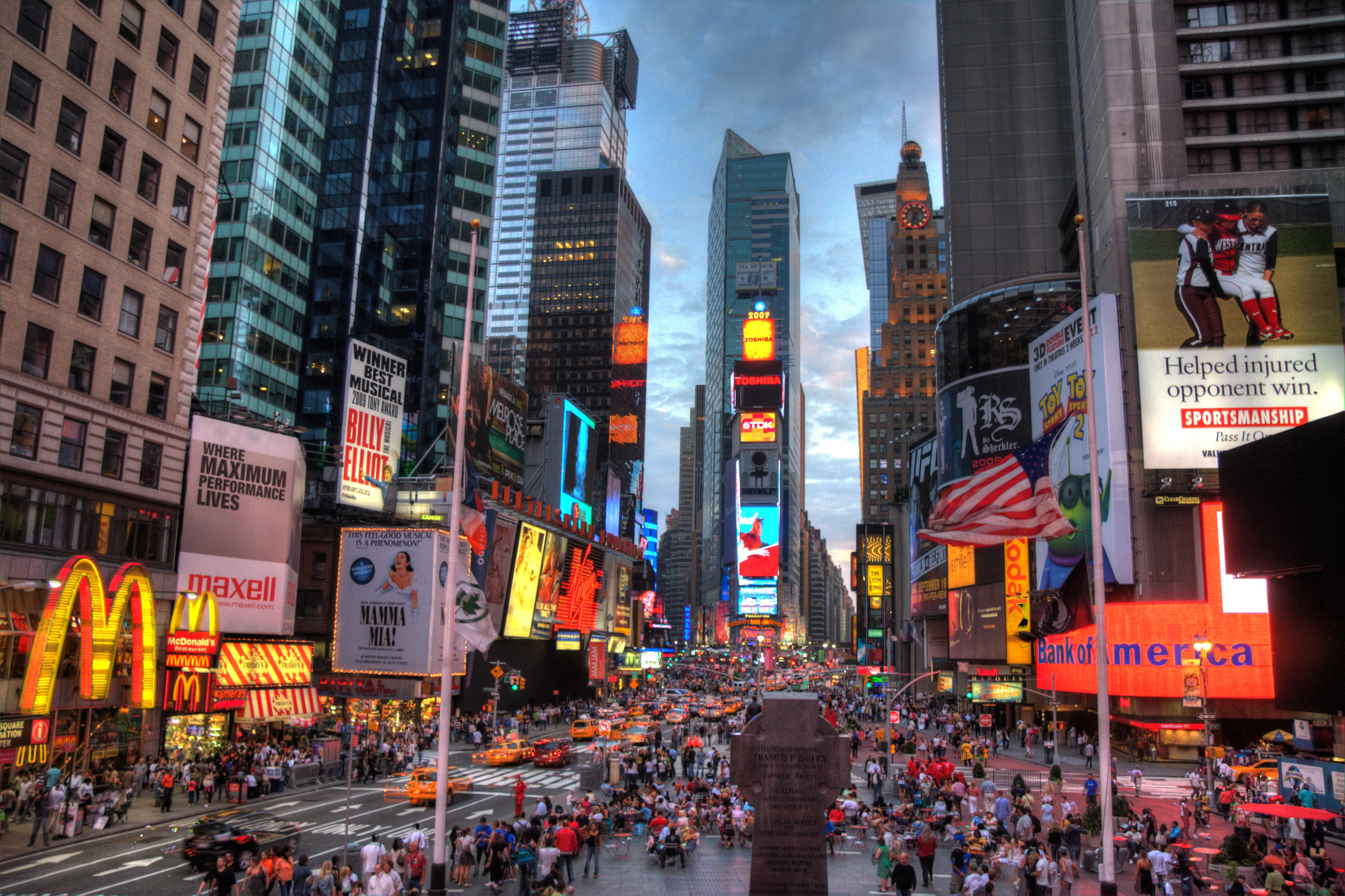
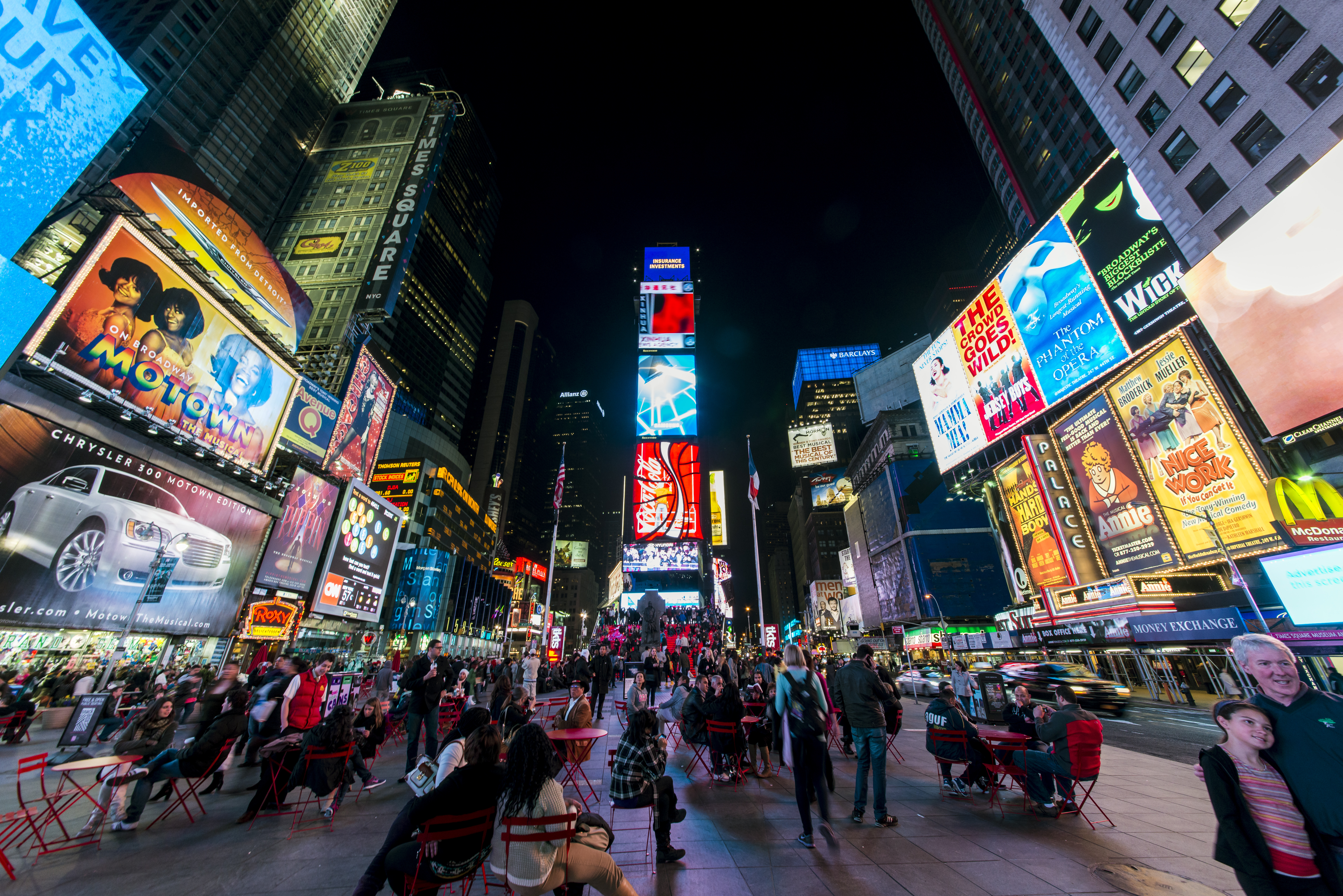
- Looking south (top) and north (bottom) in 2009 and 2013, respectively
- Features: Duffy Square; George Michael Cohan statue One Times Square
- Location: Manhattan 5, New York City, United States
- Intersection: Broadway, 7th Avenue, 42nd and 47th Streets
- Public transit: Subway services: at Times Square–42nd Street at 42nd Street–Port Authority Bus Terminal; Bus routes: M7, M20, M42, M50, M104
- Interactive map of Times Square
- Coordinates: 40°45′27″N 73°59′09″W

Times Square is one of the world's busiest pedestrian intersections, tourist destinations, and entertainment hubs. It is formed by the junction of Broadway, Seventh Avenue, and 42nd Street in Midtown Manhattan, New York City. Together with adjacent Duffy Square, Times Square is a bowtie-shaped plaza five blocks long between 42nd and 47th Streets. As an epicenter of the world's entertainment industry and as the physical hub of the Theater District, where most Broadway theaters are located, Times Square is constantly illuminated by numerous digital billboards and advertisements as well as businesses offering 24/7 service.

Times Square is one of the world's most visited tourist attractions, drawing an estimated 50 million visitors annually. Approximately 330,000 people pass through Times Square daily, many of them tourists, while over 460,000 pedestrians walk through Times Square on its busiest days. The Times Square–42nd Street and 42nd Street–Port Authority Bus Terminal stations have consistently ranked as the busiest in the New York City Subway system, transporting more than 200,000 passengers daily. The Times Square neighborhood takes its name after the intersection.

Formerly known as Longacre Square, Times Square was renamed in 1904 after The New York Times moved its headquarters to the then newly erected Times Building, now One Times Square. It is the site of the annual New Year's Eve ball drop, which began on December 31, 1907, and continues to attract over a million visitors to Times Square every year, in addition to a worldwide audience of one billion or more on various digital media platforms.

Times Square, specifically the intersection of Broadway and 42nd Street, is the eastern terminus of the Lincoln Highway, the first road across the United States for motorized vehicles. Times Square is sometimes referred to as "the Crossroads of the World", "the Center of the Universe", and "the heart of the Great White Way".

== Geography ==
Times Square functions as a town square, but is not geometrically a square. It is closer in shape to a bowtie, with two triangles emanating roughly north and south from 45th Street, where Seventh Avenue intersects Broadway. Broadway similarly intersects other north–south avenues at Union Square, Madison Square, Herald Square, and Verdi Square, none of which are squares. The area is bounded by West 42nd Street, West 47th Street, 7th Avenue, and Broadway. Broadway runs diagonally, crossing through the horizontal and vertical street grid of Manhattan laid down by the Commissioners' Plan of 1811, and that intersection creates the "bowtie" shape of Times Square.

Times Square is the official name of the southern triangle, below 45th Street. The northern triangle is officially known as Duffy Square and was dedicated in June 1939 to honor World War I chaplain Father Francis P. Duffy of the 69th New York Infantry Regiment. A statue by Charles Keck was dedicated in May 1937 as a memorial to Duffy. There is also a statue of composer and entertainer George M. Cohan, and the TKTS discount ticket booth for same-day Broadway and off-Broadway theaters that has been at the site since June 1973.

== History ==
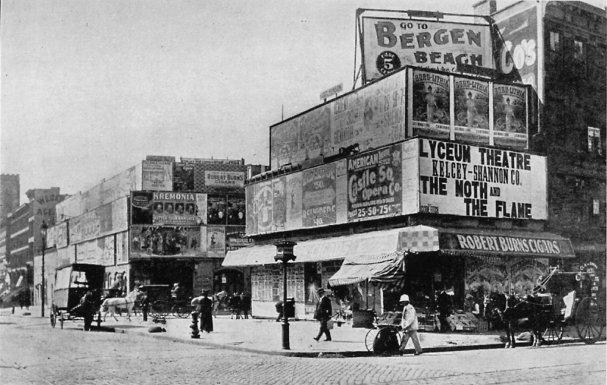
Broadway at 42nd Street in 1898

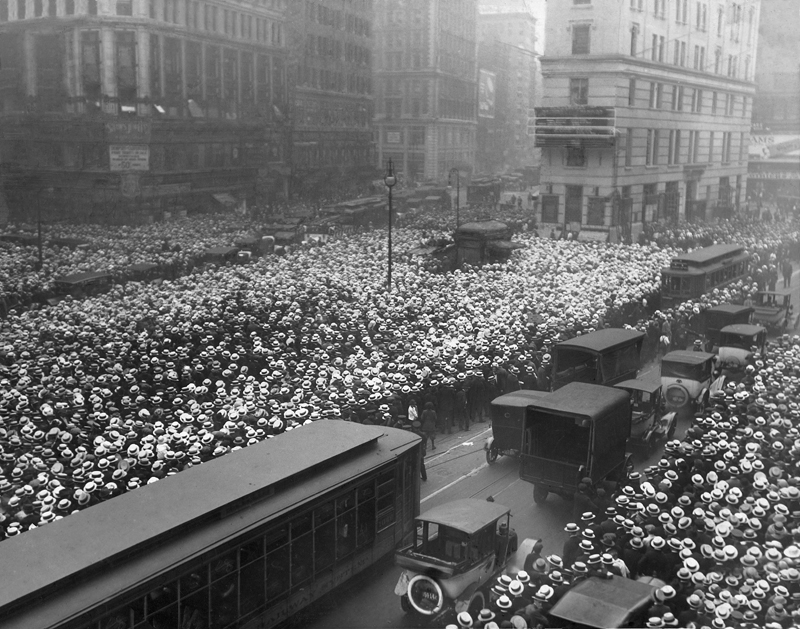
A crowd outside One Times Square follows the progress of the Jack Dempsey vs. Georges Carpentier boxing fight in 1921.

=== Early history ===
When Manhattan Island was first settled by the Dutch colonists, three small streams united near what is now the intersection of 10th Avenue and 40th Street. These three streams formed the "Great Kill" (Dutch: Grote Kil). From there the Great Kill wound through the low-lying Reed Valley, known for fish and waterfowl, and emptied into a deep bay in the Hudson River at the present 42nd Street. The name was retained in a tiny hamlet, Great Kill, that became a center for carriage-making, as the upland to the south and east became known as Longacre.

Before and after the American Revolution, the area belonged to John Morin Scott, a general of the New York militia, in which he served under George Washington. Scott's manor house was at what is currently 43rd Street, surrounded by countryside used for farming and breeding horses. In the first half of the 19th century, it became one of the prized possessions of John Jacob Astor, who made a second fortune selling off lots to hotels and other real estate concerns as the city rapidly spread uptown.

By 1872, the area had become the center of New York's horse carriage industry. The locality had not previously been given a name, and city authorities called it Longacre Square after Long Acre in London, where the horse and carriage trade was centered in that city. William Henry Vanderbilt owned and ran the American Horse Exchange there. In 1910, it became the Winter Garden Theatre.

As more profitable commerce and industrialization of Lower Manhattan pushed homes, theaters, and prostitution northward from the Tenderloin District, Longacre Square became nicknamed the Thieves Lair for its increasingly prominent reputation as a low entertainment district. The first theater on the square, the Olympia, was built by cigar manufacturer and impresario Oscar Hammerstein I. According to Gotham: A History of New York City to 1898, "By the early 1890s this once sparsely settled stretch of Broadway was ablaze with electric light and thronged by crowds of middle- and upper-class theatre, restaurant and cafe patrons."

=== 1900s–1930s ===
In 1904, New York Times publisher Adolph S. Ochs moved the newspaper's operations to a new skyscraper on 42nd Street at Longacre Square, on the site of the former Pabst Hotel, which had existed on the site for less than a decade since it opened in November 1899. Ochs persuaded Mayor George B. McClellan Jr. to construct a subway station there, and the area was renamed "Times Square" on April 8, 1904. Just three weeks later, the first electrified advertisement appeared on the side of a bank at the corner of 46th Street and Broadway. The north end later became Duffy Square, and the former Horse Exchange became the Winter Garden Theatre, constructed in 1911.

The New York Times moved to more spacious offices one block west of the square in 1913 and sold the building in 1961. The old Times Building was later named the Allied Chemical Building in 1963. Now known simply as One Times Square, it is famed for the Times Square Ball drop on its roof every New Year's Eve.

In 1913, the Lincoln Highway Association, headed by entrepreneur Carl G. Fisher, chose the intersection of 42nd Street and Broadway (at the southeast corner of Times Square) to be the Eastern Terminus of the Lincoln Highway. This was the first road across the United States, which originally ran 3,389 mi (5,454 km) coast to coast through 13 states to its western terminus in Lincoln Park in San Francisco.

Times Square grew dramatically after World War I. It became a cultural hub full of theaters, music halls, and upscale hotels.

Times Square quickly became New York's agora, a place to gather to await great tidings and to celebrate them, whether a World Series or a presidential election.

— James Traub, The Devil's Playground: A Century of Pleasure and Profit in Times Square

Advertising also grew significantly in the 1920s, growing from $25 million to $85 million over the decade. For example, the Wrigley Spearmint Gum sign, possibly the biggest electric sign "in the world," cost $9,000 per month to rent. Some contemporary critics, such as Thorstein Veblen and G. K. Chesterton, disliked the advertising at Times Square. Fritz Lang, after seeing Times Square in 1923, used it as inspiration for his dark industrial film Metropolis.

Entertainment icons such as Irving Berlin, Charlie Chaplin, and Fred Astaire were closely associated with Times Square in the 1910s, 1920s, and 1930s. However, it was also during this period that the area began to be besieged by crime and corruption, in the form of gambling and prostitution; one case that garnered huge attention was the arrest and subsequent execution of police officer Charles Becker.

=== 1930s–1950s ===
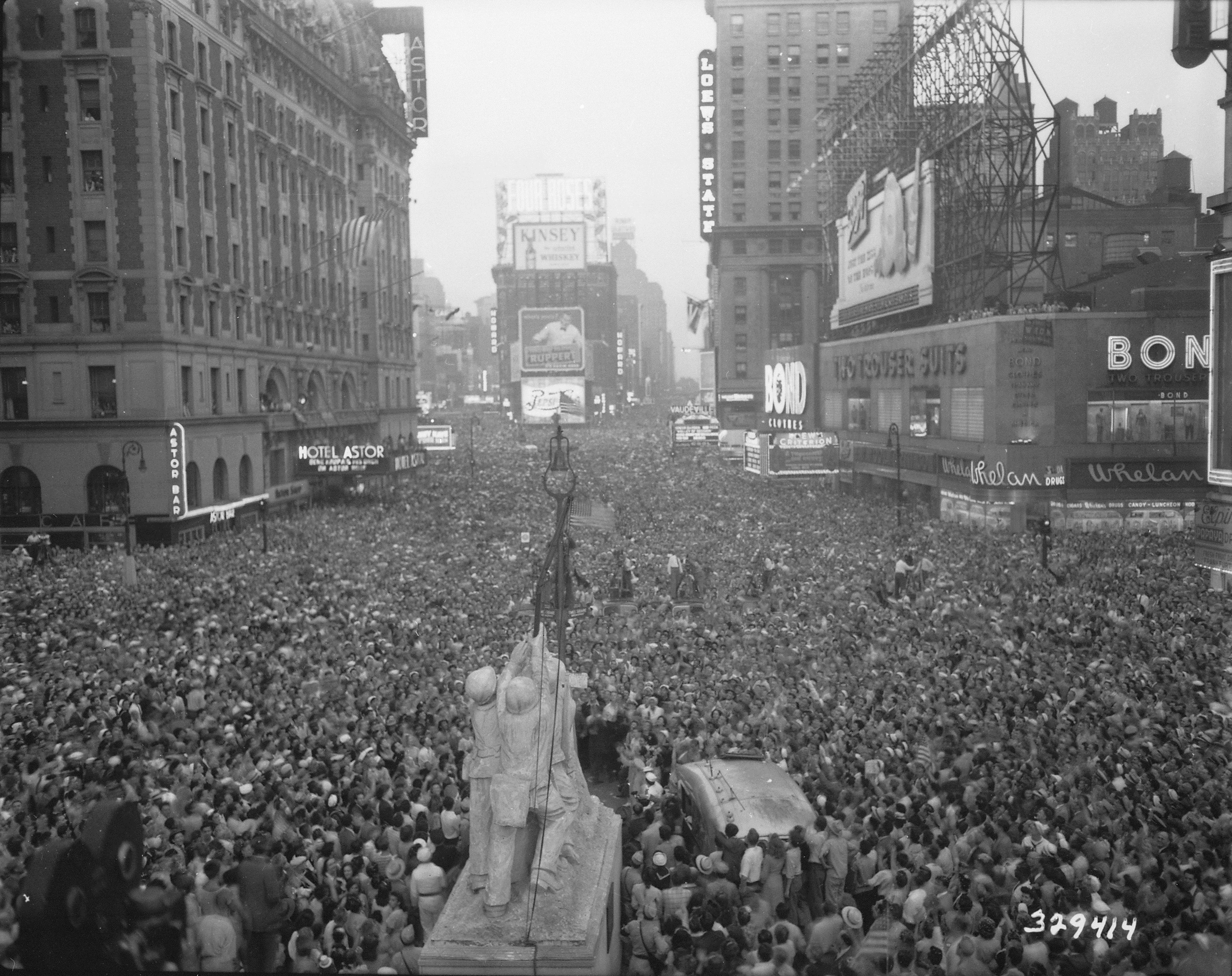
Crowds celebrating in Times Square on V-J Day (August 15, 1945)

New Year's festivities at Times Square on January 1, 1958
New Year's Day festivities at Times Square on January 1, 1958.

The general atmosphere of Times Square changed with the onset of the Great Depression in the early 1930s. City residents moved uptown to cheaper neighborhoods, and many popular theaters closed, replaced by saloons, brothels, "burlesque halls, vaudeville stages, and dime houses". The area acquired a reputation as a dangerous and seedy neighborhood in the following decades.

Nevertheless, Times Square continued to be the site of the annual ball drop on New Year's Eve. The ball drop was placed on hiatus for New Year's Eve in 1942 and 1943 due to lighting restrictions during World War II, replaced by a moment of silence that was observed at midnight in Times Square, accompanied by the sound of chimes played from sound trucks.

On May 8, 1945, a massive crowd celebrated Victory in Europe Day in Times Square; and on August 15, 1945, the largest crowd in the history of Times Square gathered to celebrate Victory over Japan Day, reaching an estimated two million. The victory itself was announced by a headline on the "zipper" news ticker at One Times Square, which read "OFFICIAL ***TRUMAN ANNOUNCES JAPANESE SURRENDER ***".

=== 1960s–1990s ===
==== Decline ====
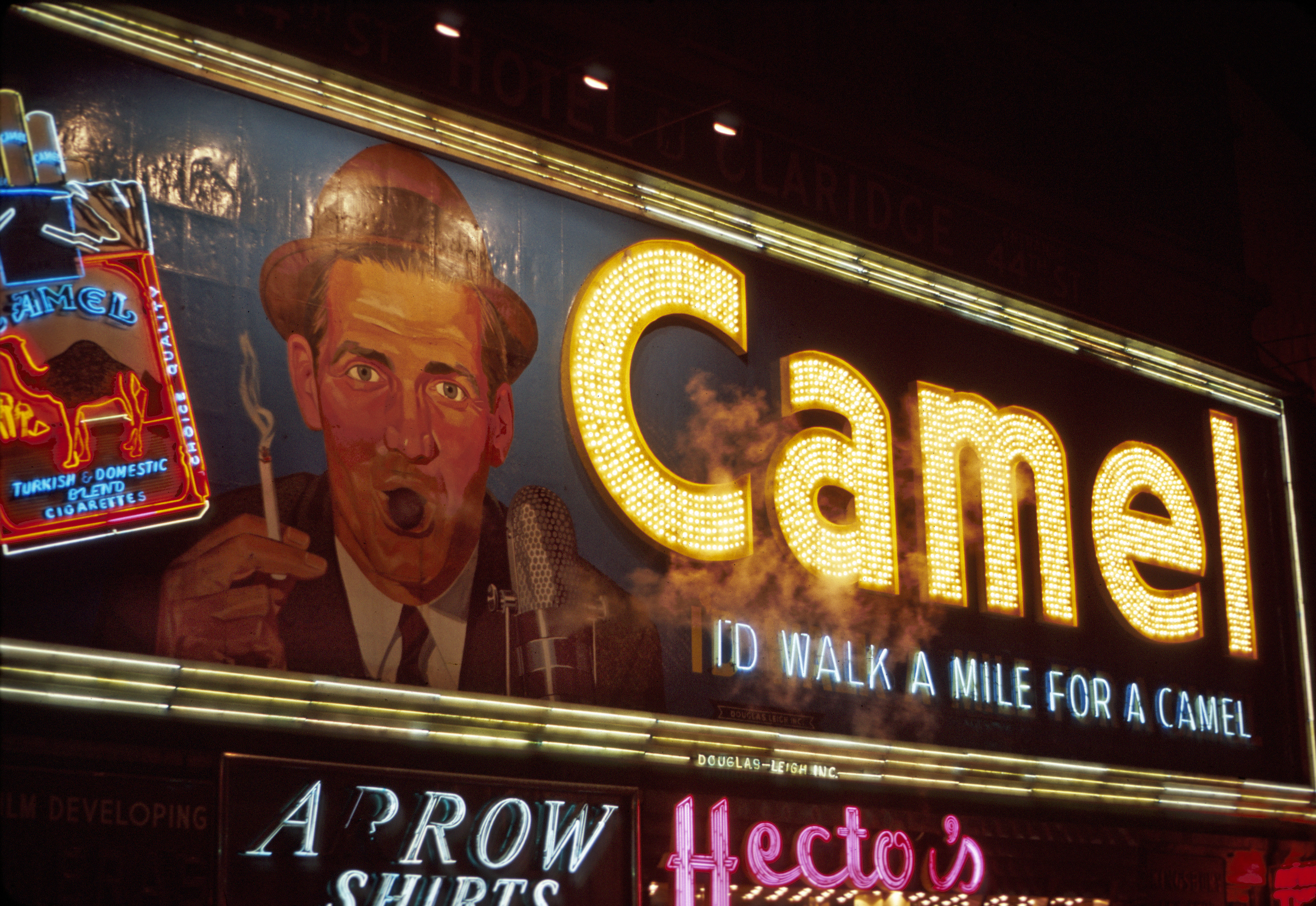
Camel Cigarettes sign, 1965. Below and near the letters "Cam" is smoke from a disintegrating smoke ring.

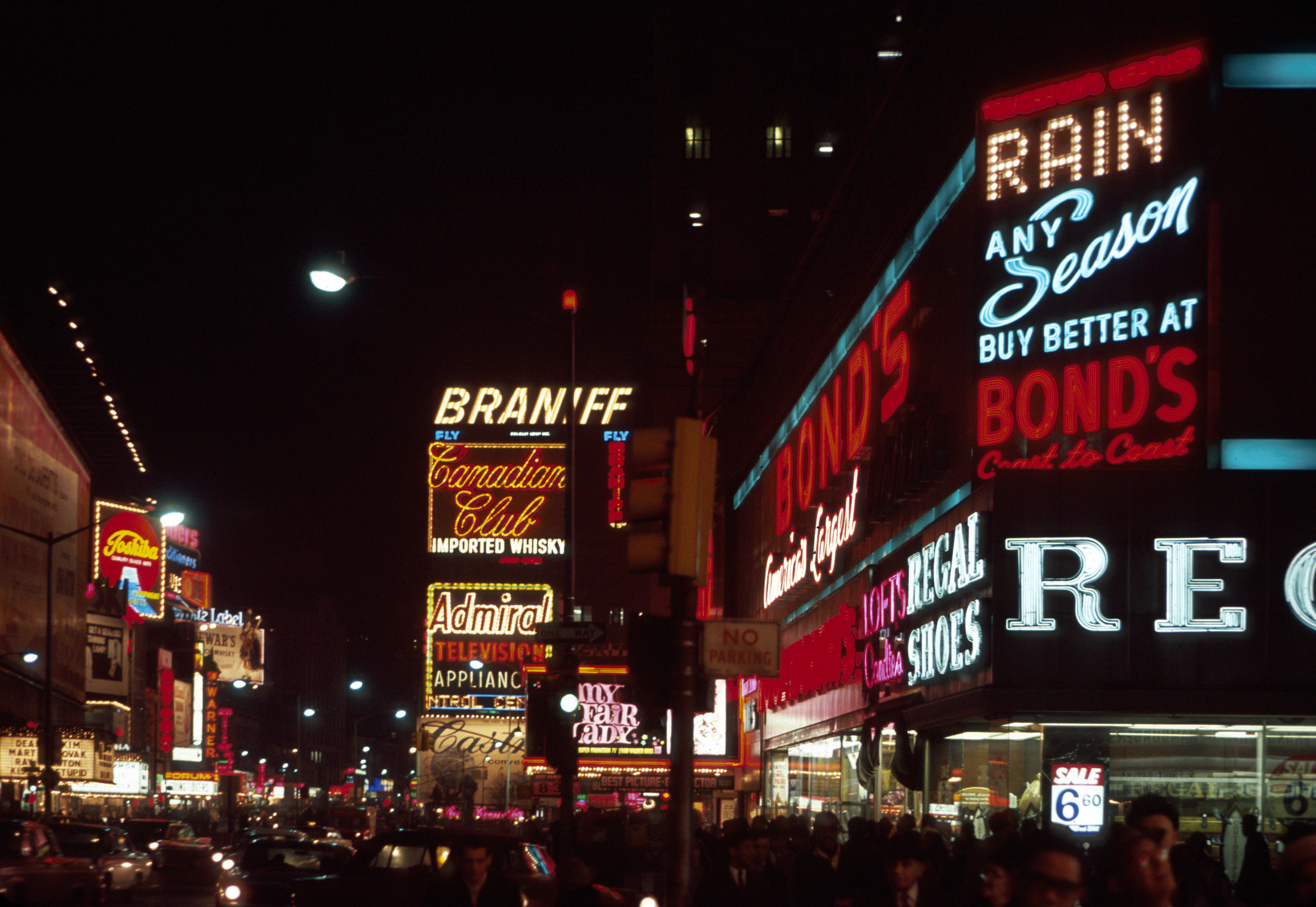
Times Square, 1965; the My Fair Lady marquee is at center.

From the 1960s to the early 1990s, the seediness of the area, especially due to its go-go bars, sex shops, peep shows, and porn theaters, became an infamous symbol of the city's decline. As early as 1960, 42nd Street between Seventh and Eighth avenues was described by The New York Times as "the 'worst' [block] in town". Later that decade, Times Square was depicted in Midnight Cowboy as gritty, depraved, and desperate. Conditions only worsened in the 1970s and 1980s, as did the crime in the rest of the city, with a 1981 article in Rolling Stone magazine calling 42nd Street in Times Square the "sleaziest block in America". In the mid-1980s, the area bounded by 40th and 50th Streets and Seventh and Ninth Avenues saw over 15,000 crime complaints per year. The block of 42nd Street between Seventh and Eighth avenues had 2,300 crimes per year in 1984, of which 20% were felonies.

Times Square was known in the 1970s-80s as the most notorious area for prostitution. In this era, formerly elegant movie theaters began to show x-rated films, and peep shows hustlers were common. In 1984, the area was so derelict and dilapidated, that the entire Times Square area paid the city only $6 million in property taxes (equivalent to $18.6 million in 2025).

==== 1980s building boom ====
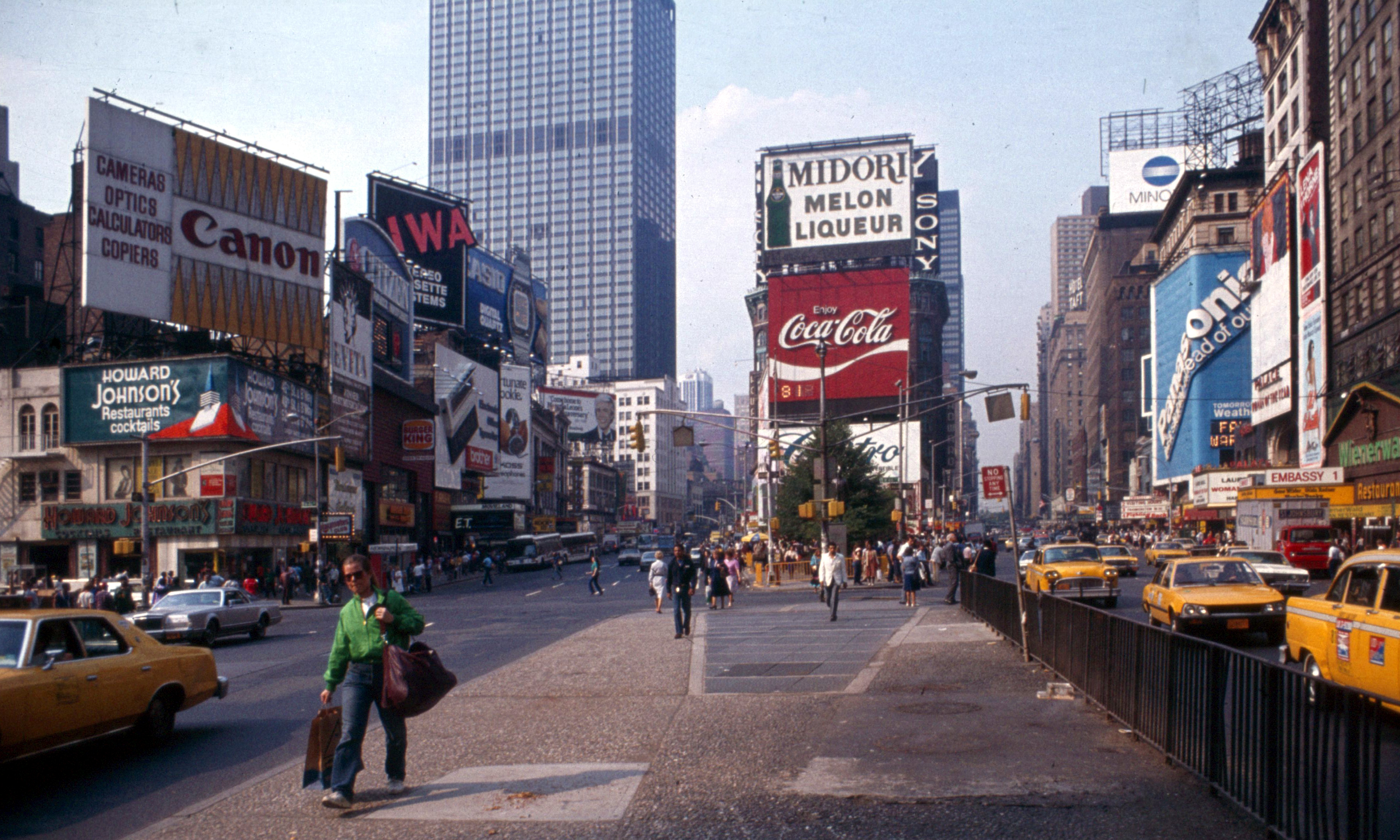
Times Square in 1982

In the 1980s, a commercial building boom began in the western parts of Midtown as part of a long-term development plan developed under mayors Ed Koch and David Dinkins. These included office buildings such as 1540 Broadway, 1585 Broadway, and 750 Seventh Avenue, as well as hotels such as the Macklowe Hotel, Marriott Marquis, Crowne Plaza, and DoubleTree Suites. By 1986, New York City Planning Commission (CPC) was considering enacting regulations that would have forced new buildings along Times Square to include bright signage as well as deep setbacks. The CPC adopted a planning regulation in 1987, which required large new developments in Times Square to set aside about 5 percent of their space for "entertainment uses". (Note: Any development under 60,000 ft^{2} (5,600 m^{2}) was exempt from the rule; for larger buildings, the first 50,000 ft^{2} (4,600 m^{2}) of a development was exempt from the bonus calculation. For example, in a building with 500,000 ft^{2} (46,000 m^{2}), the bonus calculation was derived from 5 percent of 450,000 ft^{2} (42,000 m^{2}), so the space to be set aside for entertainment uses was 22,500 ft^{2} (2,090 m^{2}).) The regulation also required new buildings on Times Square to include large, bright signs. The buildings at 1540 Broadway, 1585 Broadway, and 750 Seventh Avenue were completed at the beginning of the early 1990s recession, when 14.5 percent of Manhattan office space was vacant. Furthermore, some 9×10^{6} ft^{2} (840,000 m^{2}) of office space in the western section of Midtown had been developed in the 1980s, of which only half had been leased. Consequently, 1540 Broadway was completely empty, while 1585 Broadway and 750 Seventh Avenue had one tenant each, despite the buildings having over 2×10^{6} ft^{2} (190,000 m^{2}) of office space between them. Entertainment conglomerate Bertelsmann bought 1540 Broadway in 1992, spurring a revival of Times Square in the early 1990s. This was hastened when financial firm Morgan Stanley bought 1585 Broadway in 1993, followed by 750 Seventh Avenue in 1994.

==== 42nd Street Redevelopment, further revitalization ====
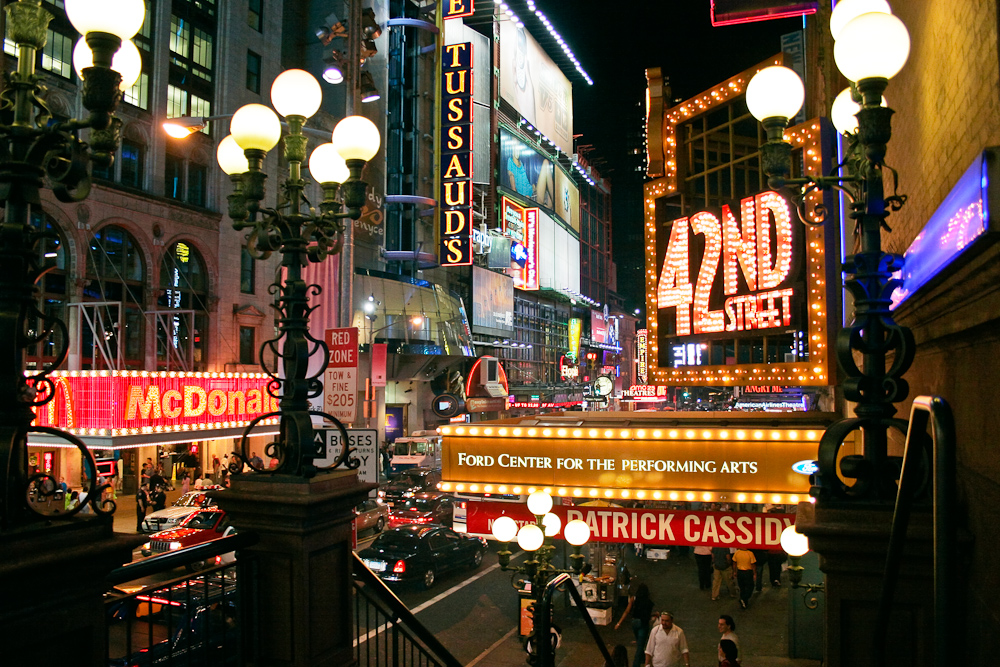
The pace, extensive transit connectivity, and the theatrical tradition of 42nd Street, between Seventh and Eighth Avenues, have made this one of the best known streets in the Times Square neighborhood and the Broadway Theater District.

The Empire State Development Corporation (ESDC), an agency of the New York state government, had proposed redeveloping the area around a portion of West 42nd Street in 1981. Four towers designed by Philip Johnson and John Burgee were to be built around 42nd Street's intersections with Broadway and Seventh Avenue. These towers would have been redeveloped by George Klein of Park Tower Realty, though the Prudential Insurance Company of America joined the project in 1986. Furthermore, as part of the West Midtown special zoning district created in 1982, the New York City government had allowed new buildings in Times Square to be developed with an increased floor area ratio. To ensure the area would not be darkened at nightfall, the city passed zoning regulations that encouraged developers to add large, bright signs on their buildings.

In 1990, the State of New York took possession of six of the nine historic theaters on 42nd Street, and the New 42nd Street non-profit organization was appointed to oversee their restoration and maintenance. The theaters underwent renovation for Broadway shows, conversion for commercial purposes, or demolition. Opposition to the towers on Times Square, along with Prudential and Park Tower's inability to secure tenants for the proposed buildings, led government officials to allow Prudential and Park Tower to postpone the project in 1992. By then, Prudential had spent $300 million on condemning the sites through eminent domain. The partners retained the right to develop the sites in the future, and the ESDC's zoning guidelines remained in effect. In exchange for being permitted to delay construction of the sites until 2002, Prudential and Park Tower were compelled to add stores and install large signage on the existing buildings.

In 1992, the Times Square Alliance (formerly the Times Square Business Improvement District, or "BID" for short), a coalition of city government and local businesses dedicated to improving the quality of commerce and cleanliness in the district, started operations in the area. In 1998, the alliance opened a tourist information center in the former Embassy Theatre at 1560 Broadway; the information center operated until 2014.

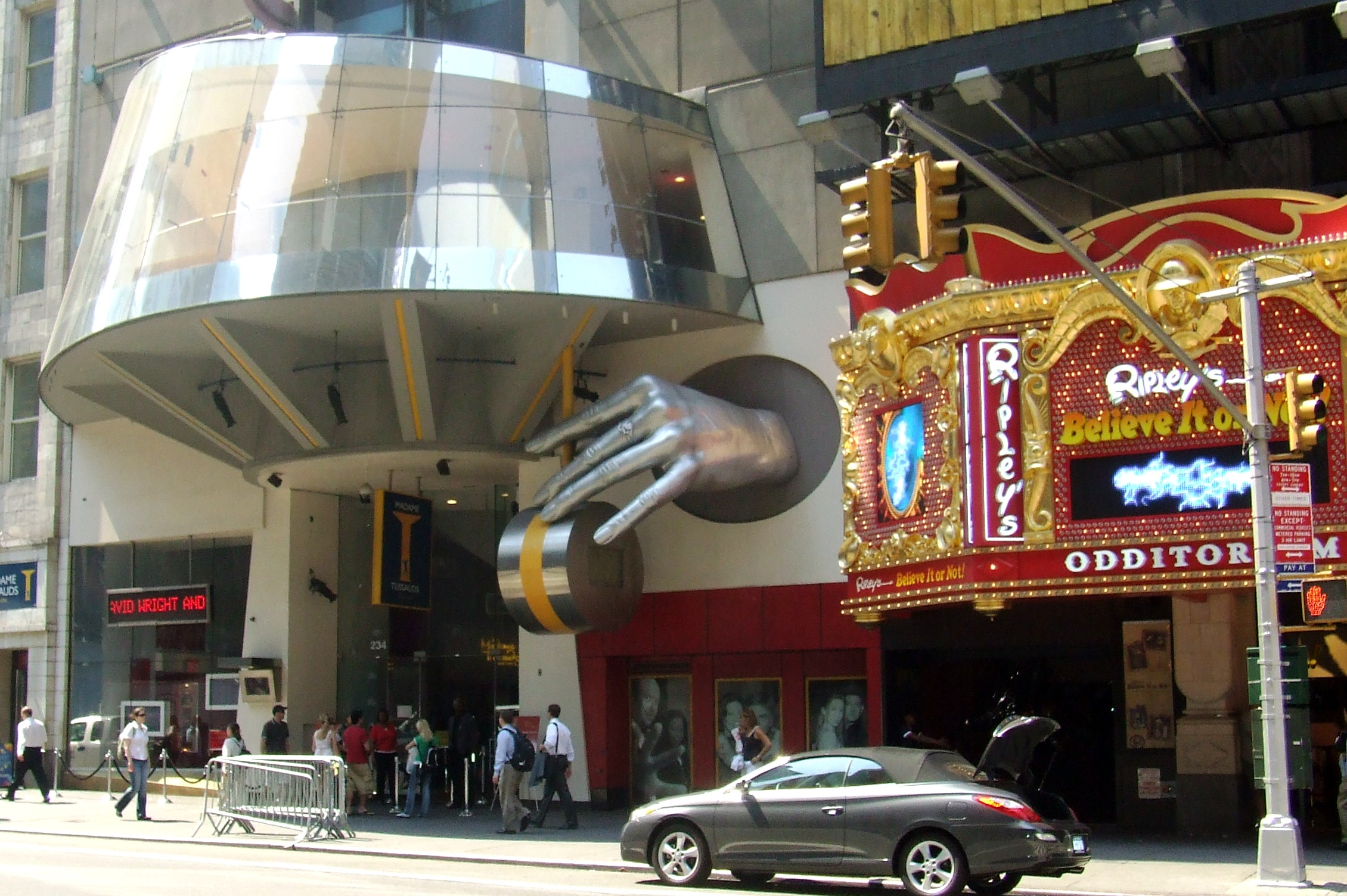
Madame Tussauds Wax Museum and Ripley's Believe It or Not! Odditorium are two of the newer attractions on the redeveloped 42nd Street.

In the mid-1990s, Mayor Rudolph Giuliani led an effort to clean up the area, an effort that is described by Steve Macek in Urban Nightmares: The Media, the Right, and the Moral Panic Over the City: Security was increased, pornographic theaters were closed, and "undesirable" low-rent residents were pressured to relocate, and then more tourist-friendly attractions and upscale establishments were opened. Advocates of the remodeling claim that the neighborhood is safer and cleaner. Detractors have countered that the changes have homogenized or "Disneyfied" the character of Times Square and have unfairly targeted lower-income New Yorkers from nearby neighborhoods such as Hell's Kitchen. The changes were shaped in large part by the actions of The Walt Disney Company, which bought and restored the New Amsterdam Theatre after several attempts at redevelopment had failed. As part of a contract with Disney, officials from the city and state evicted the pornographic theaters and contracted with Madame Tussauds and AMC Theatres to move onto 42nd Street. This spurred the construction of new office towers, hotels, and tourist attractions in the area.

Prudential and Klein dissolved their partnership for the four office-building sites at Times Square's southern end in 1996. The same year, Douglas Durst acquired the site at the northeast corner of Broadway and 42nd Street, and he developed 4 Times Square there. The northwest corner of Seventh Avenue and 42nd Street was taken by Reuters, which enlisted Rudin Management as its development partner and built 3 Times Square on that corner; that building opened in 2001. In 1998, a joint venture of Klein, The Blackstone Group, and Boston Properties won the right to acquire the sites at the southwest and southeast corners of 42nd Street and Seventh Avenue for $330 million. 5 Times Square was completed on the southwest-corner site in 2002, and Times Square Tower opened on the southeast-corner site in 2004.

==== Effects ====
Times Square now features attractions such as ABC's Times Square Studios, where Good Morning America is broadcast live; competing Hershey's and M&M's stores across the street from each other, and multiple multiplex movie theaters. Additionally, the area contains restaurants such as the Bubba Gump Shrimp Company, a seafood establishment; Planet Hollywood Restaurant and Bar, a theme restaurant; and Carmine's, serving Italian cuisine. It has also attracted several large financial, publishing, and media firms to set up headquarters in the area. A larger presence of police has improved the safety of the area.

The theaters of Broadway and the huge number of animated neon and LED signs have been one of New York's iconic images as well as a symbol of the intensely urban aspects of Manhattan. Since 1987 such signage has been mandated by zoning ordinances that require building owners to display illuminated signs, the only district in New York City with this requirement. The neighborhood has a minimum limit for lighting instead of the standard maximum limit. The density of illuminated signs in Times Square rivals that in Las Vegas. Officially, signs in Times Square are called "spectaculars", and the largest of them are called "jumbotrons". This signage ordinance was implemented in accordance with guidelines set in a revitalization program that New York Governor Mario Cuomo implemented in 1993.

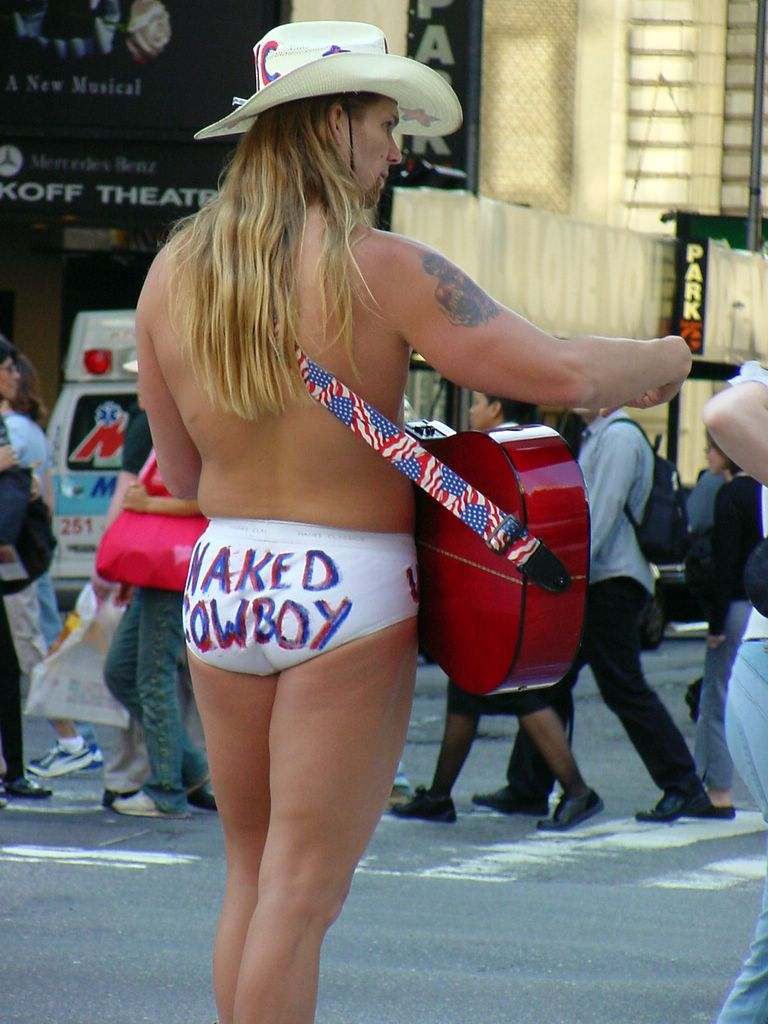
The "Naked Cowboy" has been a fixture on Times Square for decades.

Notable signage includes the Toshiba billboard directly under the NYE ball drop, the curved seven-story NASDAQ sign at the NASDAQ MarketSite at 4 Times Square on 43rd Street, and the curved Coca-Cola sign located underneath another large LED display owned and operated by Samsung. Both the Coca-Cola sign and Samsung LED displays were built by LED display manufacturer Daktronics. Times Square's first environmentally friendly billboard powered by wind and solar energy was first lit on December 4, 2008. The new 20 Times Square development hosts the largest LED signage in Times Square at 18,000 square feet. The display is 1,000 square feet larger than the Times Square Walgreens display and one of the largest video-capable screens in the world.

=== 2000s–present ===
In 2002, New York City mayor Rudy Giuliani administered the oath of office to the city's next mayor, Michael Bloomberg, at Times Square after midnight on January 1 as part of the 2001–02 New Year's celebration. Approximately 500,000 revelers attended. Security was high following the September 11 terrorist attacks in 2001, with more than 7,000 New York City police officers on duty in the Square, twice the number for an ordinary year.

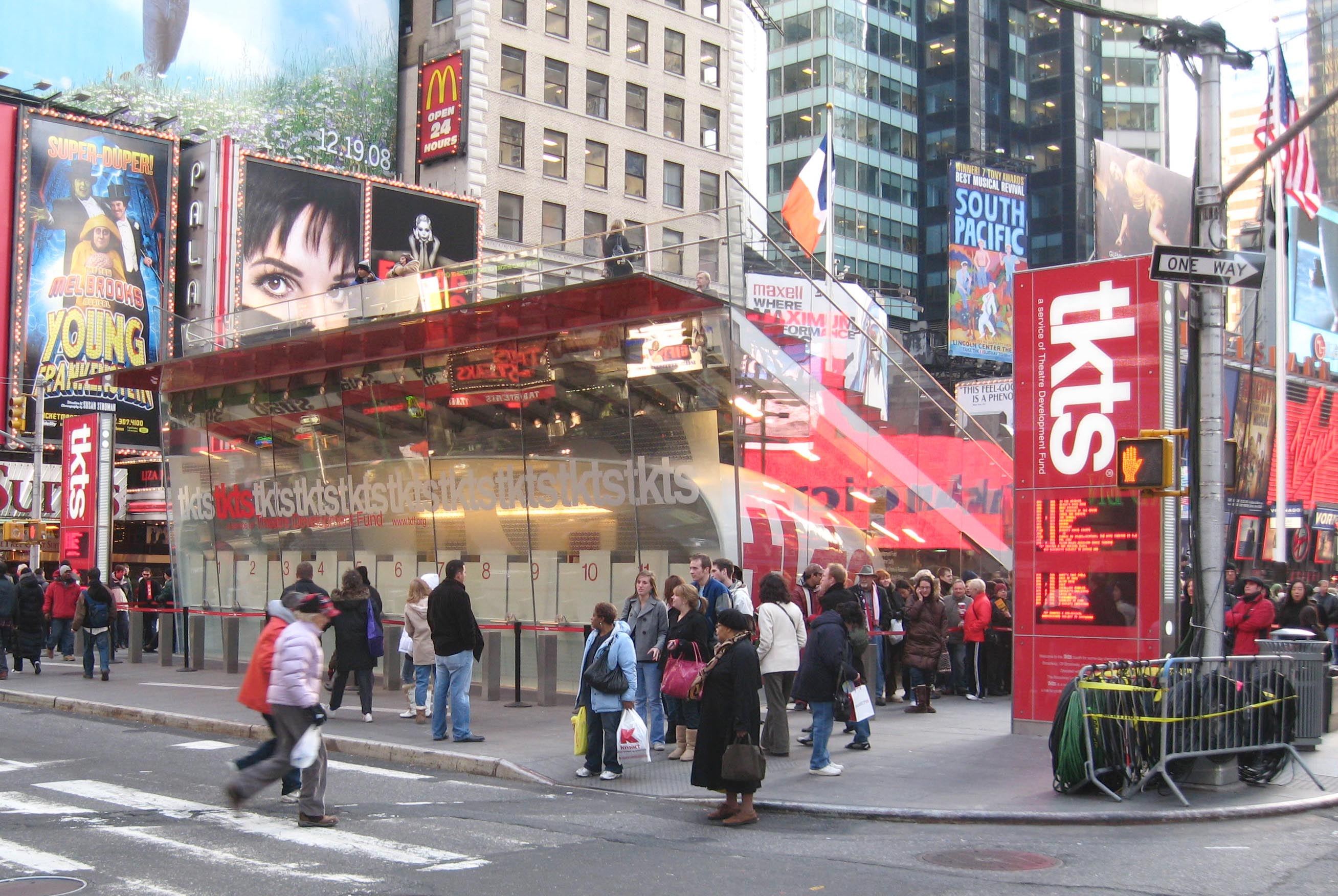
Looking southeast at TKTS ticket booth in December 2008 at Times Square

Times Square started hosting other major annual events in the 2000s. Since 2002, the summer solstice has been marked by "Mind over Madness", a mass yoga event involving up to 15,000 people. Tim Tompkins, a co-founder of the event, said part of its appeal was "finding stillness and calm amid the city rush on the longest day of the year". Architect Mark Foster Gage proposed and designed the original Times Square Valentine's Day heart in 2009. Since then, designing the heart has become an annual competition.

In February 2011, Times Square became smoke-free as New York extended the outdoors smoking ban to the area. The measure imposed a $50 fine for any person caught smoking within the area. From January 29 to February 1, 2014, a "Super Bowl Boulevard" was held on Broadway, especially in Times Square, between 34th and 47th Streets, as part of Super Bowl XLVIII. The boulevard contained activities such as autographs, a 60 ft (18 m)-high toboggan run, and photographs with the Vince Lombardi Trophy. The area was under increased security and witnessed over 400,000 people during the period.

In October 2022, casino operator Caesars Entertainment and commercial property developer SL Green submitted a joint proposal to open a casino at 1515 Broadway, along Times Square. The community advisory committee rejected the proposal in September of 2025, therefore ending the prospects of a casino hotel in Times Square.

==== Pedestrian plaza ====
Pedestrian plaza

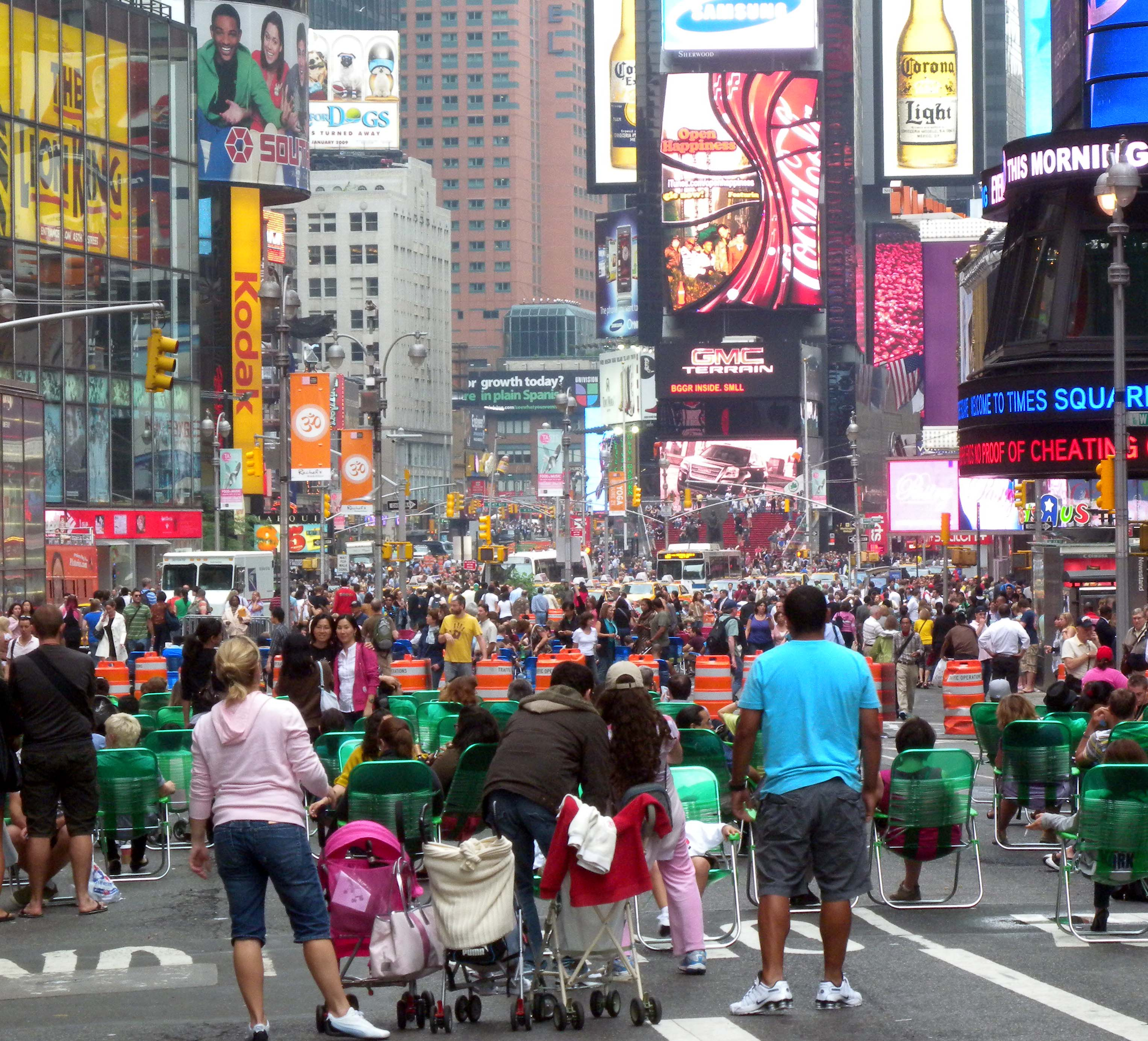
Pilot program (2009)

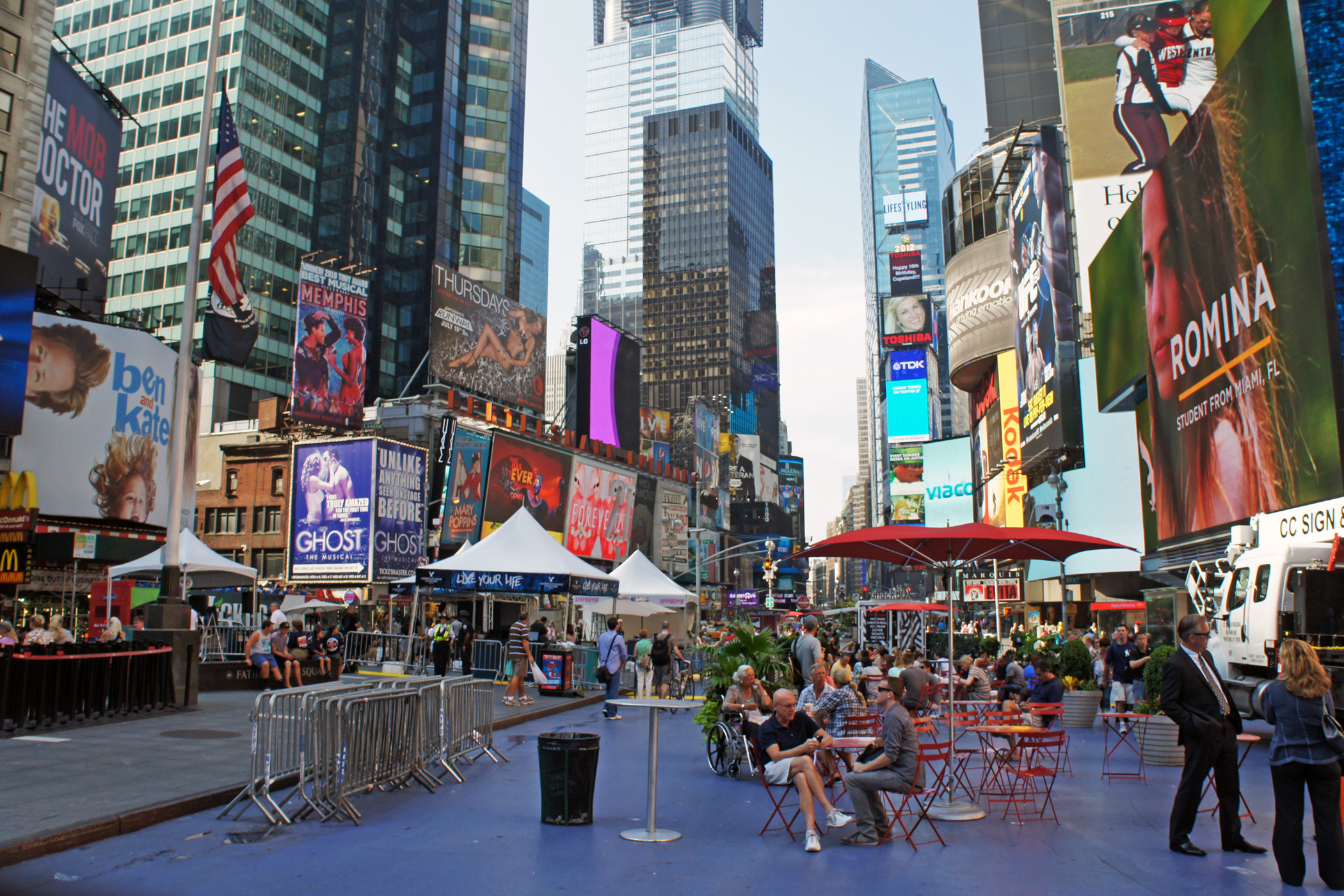
Temporary conversion (2012)

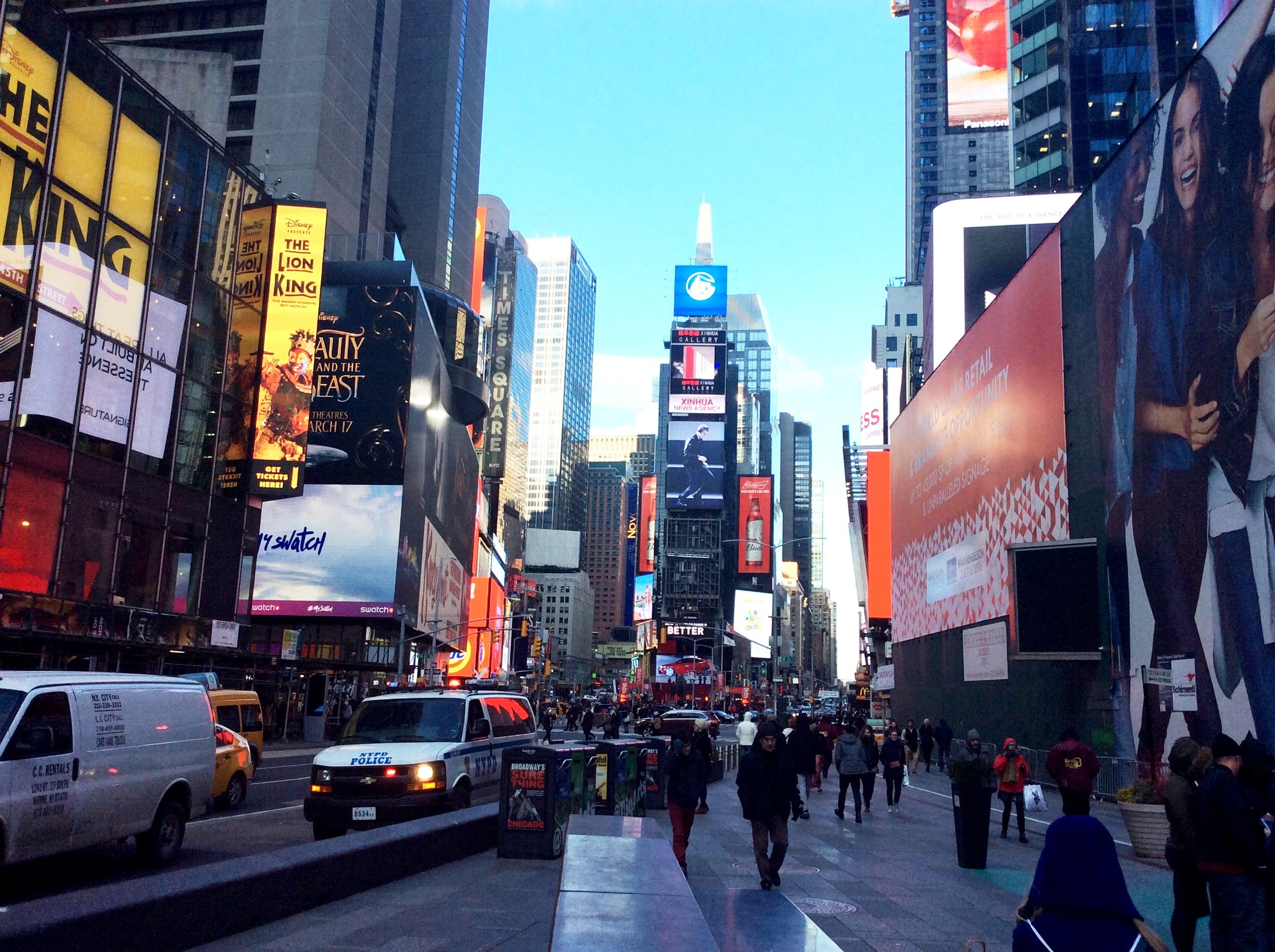
Permanent reconstruction (2017)

On February 26, 2009, Mayor Michael Bloomberg announced that traffic lanes along Broadway from 42nd Street to 47th Street would be de-mapped starting Memorial Day 2009 and transformed into pedestrian plazas as a trial until at least the end of the year. The same was done in Herald Square from 33rd to 35th Street. The results were to be closely monitored to determine if the project was successful and should be extended. Bloomberg also stated that he believed the street shutdown would make New York more livable by reducing pollution, cutting down on pedestrian-vehicle accidents, and helping traffic flow more smoothly through the Midtown street grid.

The pedestrian plaza project was originally opposed by local businesses, who thought that closing the street to cars would hurt business. The original seats put out for pedestrians were inexpensive multicolored plastic lawn chairs, a source of amusement to many New Yorkers; they lasted from the onset of the plaza transformation until August 14, 2009, when they were ceremoniously bundled together in an installation christened Now You See It, Now You Don't by the artist Jason Peters, and shortly afterward were replaced by sturdier metal furniture. Although the plaza had mixed results on traffic in the area, injuries to motorists and pedestrians decreased, fewer pedestrians were walking in the road, and the number of pedestrians in Times Square increased. On February 11, 2010, Bloomberg announced that the pedestrian plazas would become permanent.

The city started rebuilding the plaza in 2010, hiring the design and landscaping firm Snøhetta to permanently replace Broadway's roadway with custom-made granite pavers and benches. By December 2013, the first phase of the Times Square pedestrian plaza had been completed at the southern end of the square in time for the Times Square Ball drop on New Year's Eve. The project was originally intended to be completed by the end of 2015. The entire project was finally completed just before New Year's Eve 2016. Some safety bollards were also installed as part of the renovation to prevent vehicular attacks or collisions on the sidewalk. After a 2017 vehicle-ramming attack, there were calls to install more bollards along Times Square.

Times Square's pedestrian plaza is frequented by topless women (with painted breasts) called "desnudas", as well as costumed characters, who typically panhandle for tips. The pedestrian plaza became a source of controversy in the summer of 2015 because of a large number of complaints about the topless women and panhandling characters. Although neither of these activities are illegal, opponents believed that the panhandlers' presence was detrimental to the quality of life in the area. There were calls from Police Commissioner Bratton and Mayor Bill de Blasio to remove the plaza, although Manhattan Borough President Gale Brewer opposed the proposal. In June 2016, the city added "pedestrian flow zones" where no one was allowed to loiter, as well as "activity zones" where costumed characters were allowed to perform.

=== Incidents ===
There have been several incidents in Times Square, including some deadly incidents:

- On the morning of March 6, 2008, a small bomb caused minor damage, but there were no reported injuries.
- On May 1, 2010, Times Square was evacuated from 43rd to 46th Streets following the discovery of a car bomb. It was found to be a failed bombing.
- On May 18, 2017, a vehicle-ramming attack at Times Square killed one person and injured 22 others.
- On August 31, 2026, a woman stabbed two people at random, killing one, before being killed by police.

== Number of visitors ==
Times Square is the most visited place globally with 360,000 pedestrian visitors a day, amounting to over 131 million a year. As of 2013, it had a greater attendance than each of the Disney theme parks worldwide, with 128,794,000 visitors between March 2012 and February 2013, versus 126,479,000 for the Walt Disney World theme parks in Bay Lake, Florida, in 2012. Even excluding residents from the visitor count, Times Square is the world's second most visited tourist attraction, behind the Las Vegas Strip. The high level of pedestrian traffic has resulted in $4.8 billion in annual retail, entertainment, and hotel sales, with 22 cents out of every dollar spent by visitors in New York City being spent within Times Square.

=== New Year's Eve celebrations ===
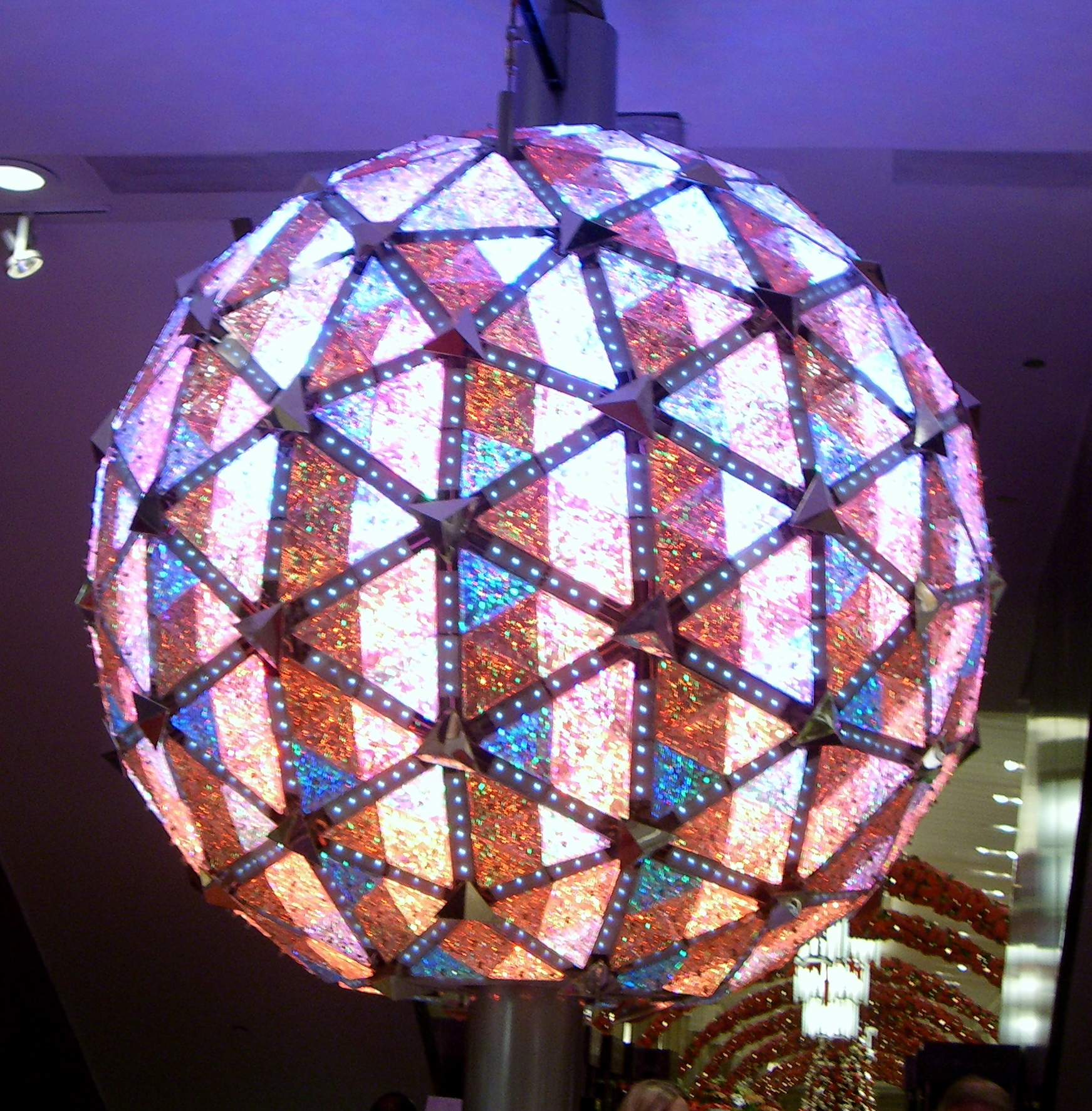
The Times Square Ball in 2007

Times Square is the site of the annual New Year's Eve ball drop. About one million revelers crowd Times Square for the New Year's Eve celebrations, more than twice the usual number of visitors the area usually receives daily. However, for the millennium celebration on December 31, 1999, published reports stated approximately two million people overflowed Times Square, flowing from Sixth Avenue to Eighth Avenue and back on Broadway and Seventh Avenue to 59th Street, making it the largest gathering in Times Square since August 1945 during celebrations marking the end of World War II.

On December 31, 1907, a ball signifying New Year's Day was first dropped at Times Square, and the Square has held the main New Year's celebration in New York City ever since. On that night, hundreds of thousands of people congregate to watch the Waterford Crystal ball being lowered on a pole atop the building, marking the start of the new year. It replaced a lavish fireworks display from the top of the building that was held from 1904 to 1906 but stopped by city officials because of the danger of fire. Beginning in 1908, and for more than eighty years thereafter, Times Square sign maker Artkraft Strauss was responsible for the ball-lowering. During World War II, a minute of silence, followed by a recording of church bells pealing, replaced the ball drop because of wartime blackout restrictions. Today, Countdown Entertainment and One Times Square handle the New Year's Eve event in conjunction with the Times Square Alliance. A new energy-efficient LED ball debuted for the arrival of 2008, which was the centennial of the Times Square ball drop. The 2008–09 ball is larger and has become a permanent installation as a year-round attraction, being used for celebrations on days such as Valentine's Day and Halloween.

The New Year's Eve celebrations are usually overseen by thousands of police officers. Aluminum barriers are erected to accommodate spectators; for the 2020 celebration, attended by a million people, barriers were erected from 38th to 59th Street and from Sixth to Eighth Avenue. Typically, the celebrations create large amounts of waste. The waste includes the 3,000 pounds of biodegradable confetti dropped at midnight, a tradition of which started in 1992. The New York City Department of Sanitation estimated that by 8 a.m. on New Year's Day 2014, it had cleared over 50 short tons (45 long tons; 45 t) of trash from the New Year's celebration, using 190 workers from their crews and the Times Square Alliance.

=== Impact of COVID-19 ===
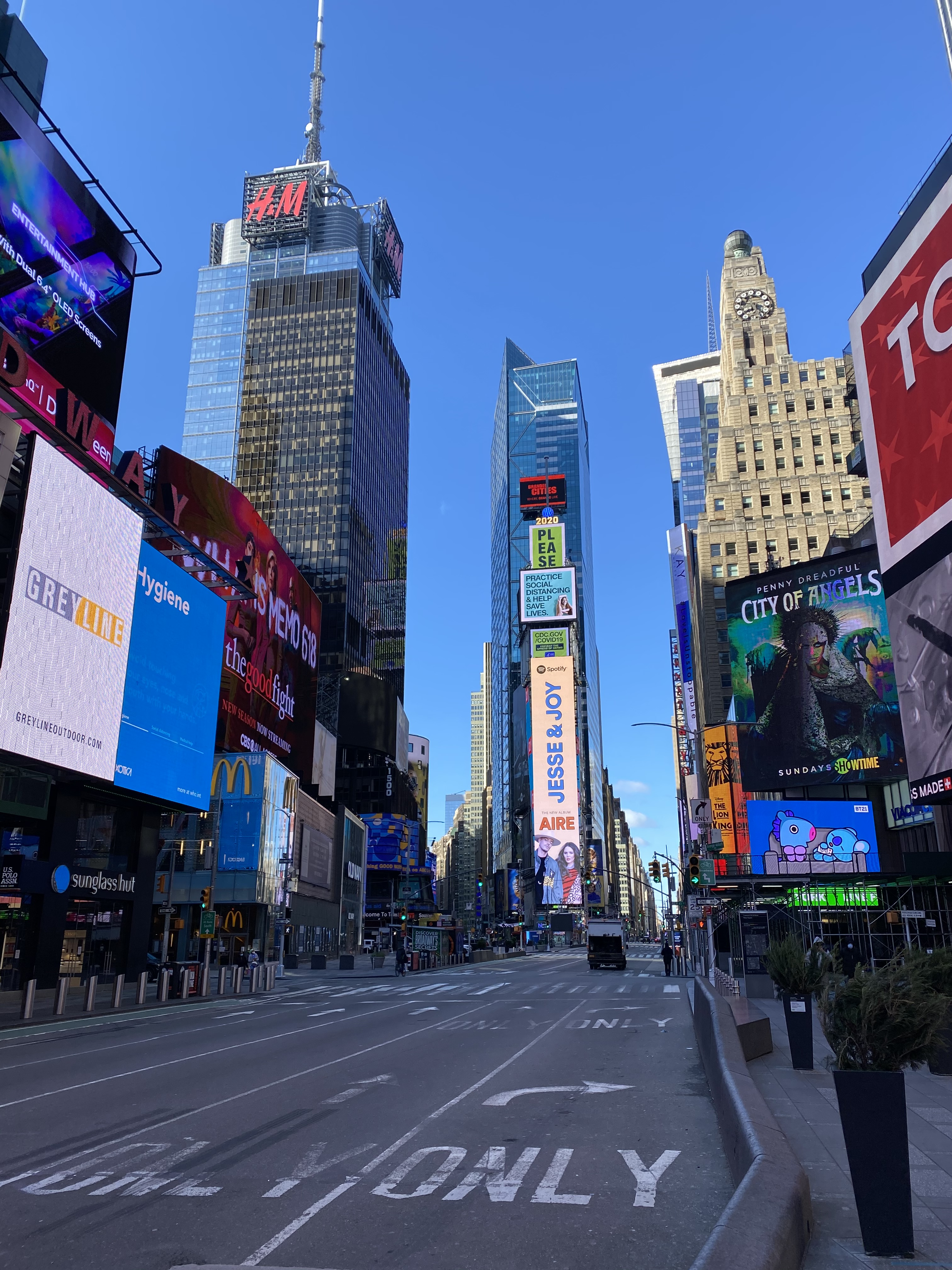
An empty Times Square in May 2020

The onset of the COVID-19 pandemic in New York City during 2020 reduced the number of people traveling to Times Square. About 108,000 pedestrians visited Times Square each day in late 2020 compared to the 380,000 before the pandemic. From March to October 2020, 26 of the area's 46 hotels closed, as well as 39 of 151 stores and 84 of 162 restaurants. Times Square was closed to the public for New Year's Day 2021 and observers were dispersed into enclosures measuring 8 by 8 ft (2.4 by 2.4 m).

== Notable landmarks ==
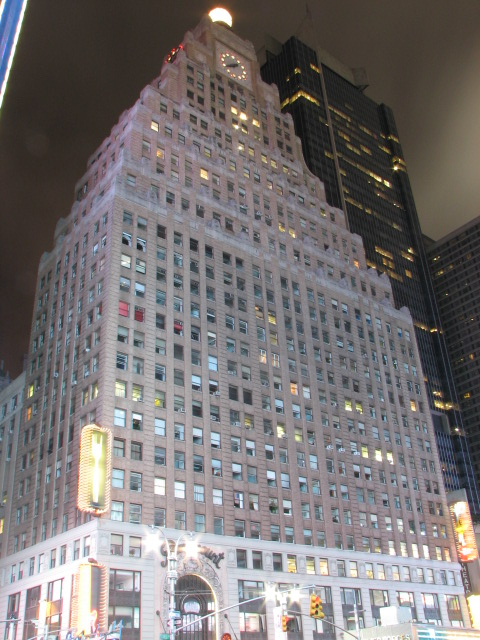
The Paramount Building at 1501 Broadway, which once housed the Paramount Theatre

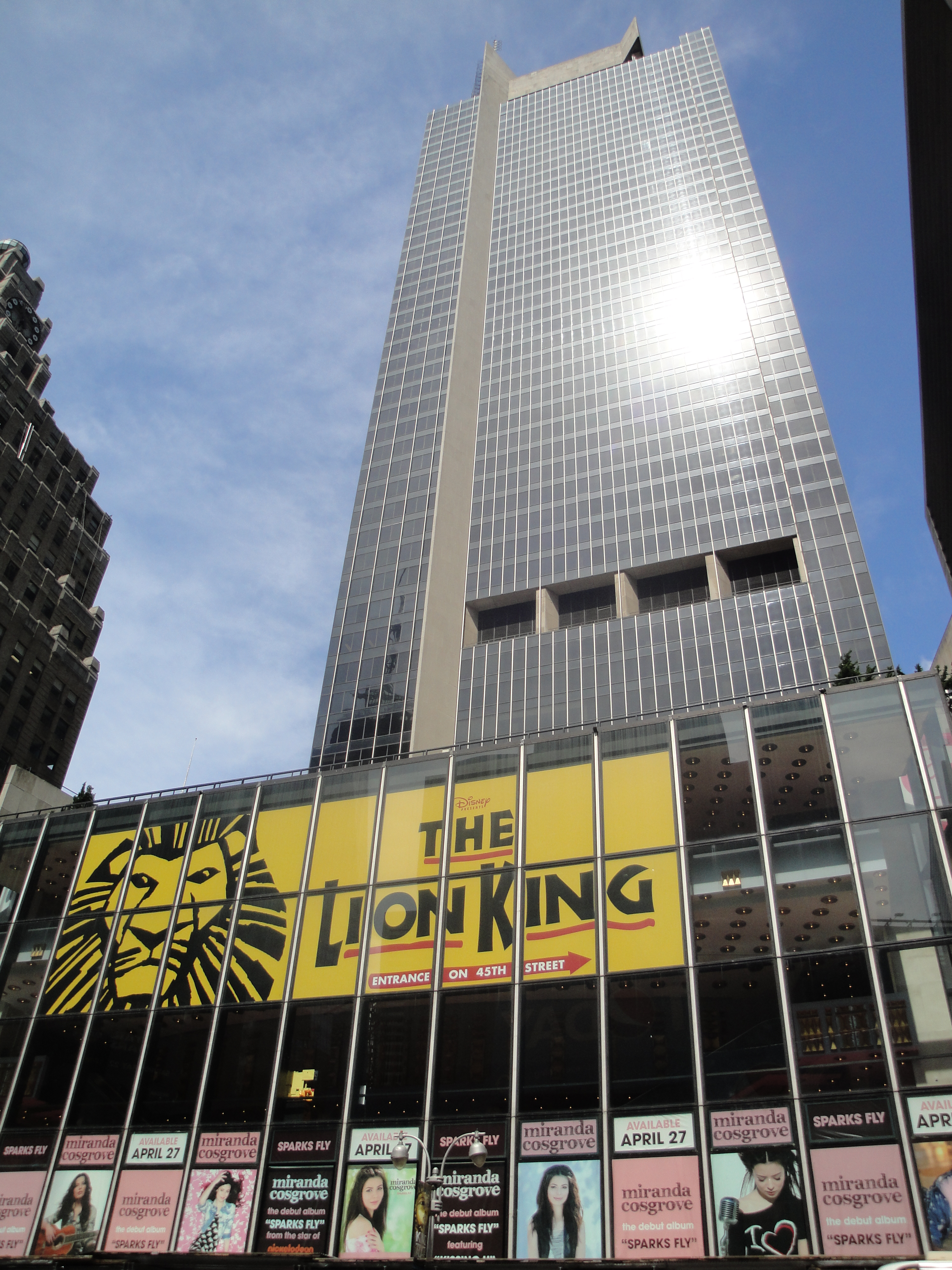
One Astor Plaza (1515 Broadway) is the headquarters of Skydance Corporation. It replaced the Astor Hotel in 1972, when Times Square redevelopment plans allowed oversized office towers if they included new theaters.

Times Square is a busy intersection of art and commerce, where scores of advertisements – electric, neon and illuminated signs and "zipper" news crawls – vie for viewers' attention. Notable examples include:

- Coca-Cola sign
- Disney Store Times Square
- Fashion One
- FashionTV
- Forever 21 (formerly Virgin Megastores)
- Krispy Kreme
- Hard Rock Cafe New York
- M&M's World
- Hershey's Chocolate World
- Planet Hollywood
- Palladium Times Square
- Revlon
- Times Square Studios – used primarily for selected ABC News and ESPN programs, such as Good Morning America
- TKTS – the Theatre Development Fund's reduced-price ticket booth has, since 2008, been backed by a red, sloped, triangular set of bleacher-like stairs, which is frequented by residents and tourists.
- Times Square – a permanently installed sound art piece by Max Neuhaus between 45th and 46th Streets.

Major buildings on or near Times Square

- 1 Astor Plaza (home of Fashion One, Revlon and MTV's New York studios)
- 745 Seventh Avenue
- 750 Seventh Avenue
- 1500 Broadway
- 1530 Broadway, the Bowtie Building
- 1540 Broadway, the Bertelsmann Building
- 1552 Broadway, the I. Miller Building
- 1560 Broadway, the Actors' Equity Building, including the former Embassy Theatre
- 1585 Broadway, the Morgan Stanley Building
- Axa Equitable Center
- Bank of America Tower
- Brill Building
- Bush Tower
- Church of Saint Mary the Virgin
- The New York Times Building
- Palace Theatre

"Numbered" Times Square buildings

- One Times Square – The former New York Times Tower (1904)
- 2 Times Square – Renaissance Hotel Times Square (1992)
- 3 Times Square – Thomson Reuters Building (1998–2001)
- 4 Times Square – Condé Nast Building (1996–1999)
- 5 Times Square – Ernst & Young Building (1999–2002)
- 6 Times Square – The Knickerbocker Hotel (1901–1906)
- 7 Times Square – Times Square Tower (2002–2004)
- 11 Times Square – Times Square Plaza (2007–2010)
- 20 Times Square – 701 7th Avenue (2019)

Hotels

- Hotel Carter
- Crowne Plaza Times Square
- Doubletree Guest Suites
- Hotel Edison
- The Knickerbocker Hotel (6 Times Square)
- Millennium Broadway
- New York Marriott Marquis
- Renaissance Hotel Times Square (2 Times Square)
- Sheraton New York
- Times Square Edition
- W Times Square
- Hilton Times Square

Corporate presence
The following companies have corporate presences in the area:

- Bain & Company
- Barclays Capital (formerly Lehman Brothers)
- Bertelsmann
- BMO Capital Markets
- Condé Nast Publications
- Diamond Management & Technology Consultants
- Ernst & Young
- Fashion One
- FashionTV
- Instinet
- King & Spalding
- Morgan Stanley
- O'Melveny & Myers
- Skydance Corporation
- Refinitiv
- Revlon
- Six Flags Inc.
- Skadden, Arps, Slate, Meagher & Flom
- The New York Times Company
- Thomson Reuters

Contemporary artists regularly perform on Times Square. Examples include test pattern [times square] by Ryoji Ikeda and Continuum by Krista Kim.

== In popular culture ==
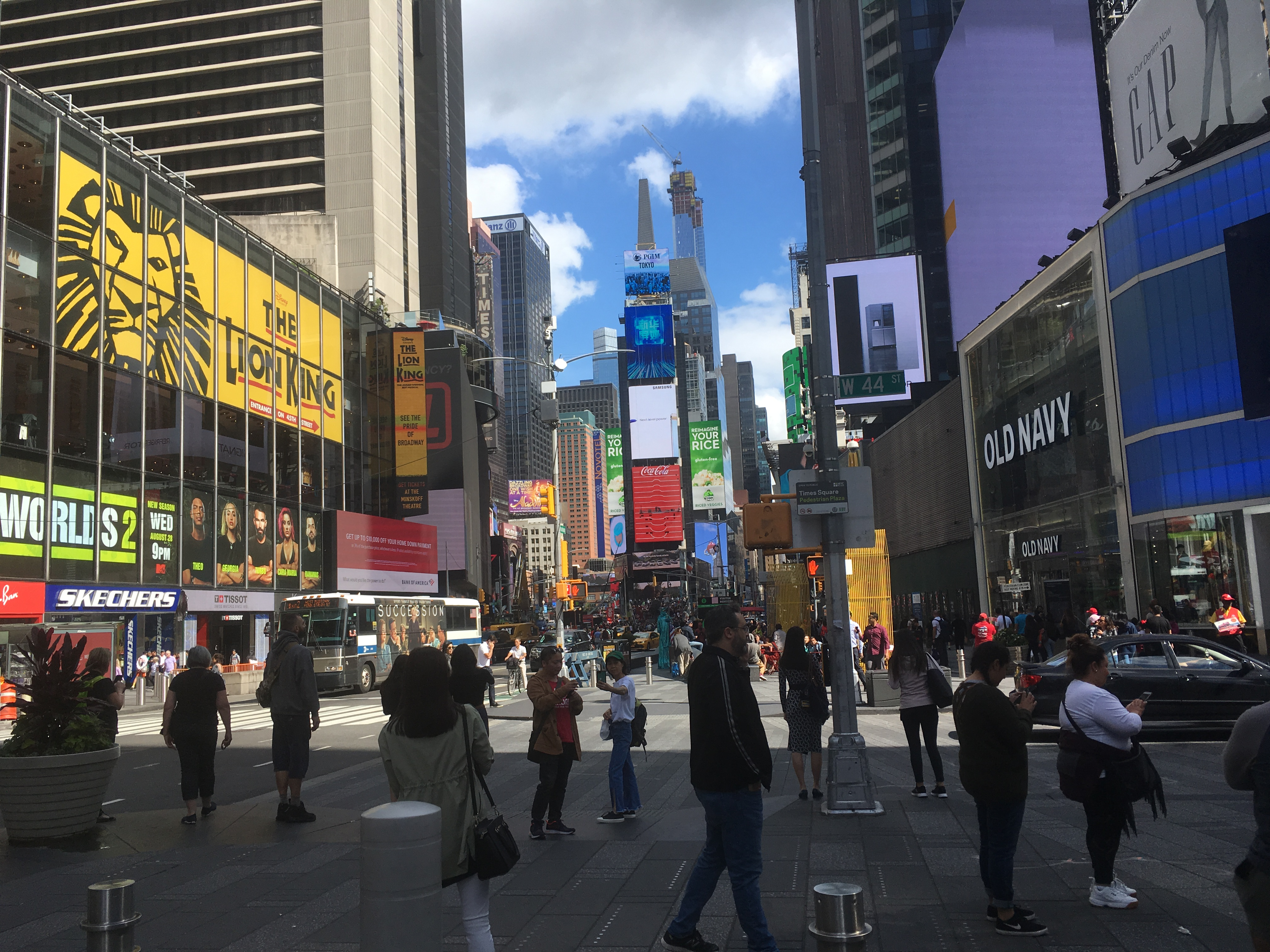
Times Square looking north from 44th Street

Times Square has been featured countless times in literature, films, video games, music videos, and on television.

The seediness of the area was featured prominently in such films as Midnight Cowboy (1969), Born to Win (1971), and Taxi Driver (1976). The area was shown in the 1980 film Times Square, which featured a punk rock/new wave soundtrack. It was also depicted in the 2011 movie New Year's Eve. The area also appeared on The Amazing Race as the starting location in a race around the world in the first episode of the show's 25th season, as well as on the sixth season of the Israeli edition of The Amazing Race with teams finishing their second leg in Times Square.

Times Square has been fictionally attacked and destroyed in several movies, including Knowing, when a solar flare destroys New York City; Deep Impact, when a tsunami created from a meteor impact destroys New York City; the 1998 film Godzilla, where Godzilla is chased through Times Square; the Ghostbusters movies; Stephen King's The Stand, where the intersection is overcome by total anarchy; Transformers: Revenge of the Fallen, Cloudy with a Chance of Meatballs, and 2012. It was also seen in the festival battle scene in the 2002 film Spider-Man, and a stand-off in the later film The Amazing Spider-Man 2.

Films and TV shows have also employed the opposite tactic, depicting the typically bustling area as eerily still, such as in Vanilla Sky, as well as the post-apocalyptic I Am Legend, in which Will Smith and his dog go hunting for deer in the deserted urban canyon. In the pilot episode of the TV series Blindspot, Times Square is completely emptied due to an abandoned bag being suspected to be a bomb.

Times Square also has featured prominently in video games. For instance, in Grand Theft Auto IV, a recreation of the Times Square area referred to in-game as "Star Junction", is included in the game's fictional "Liberty City" setting. Times Square is also shown in Battlefield 3, where the final fight with the main antagonist takes place, where the player must stop him from detonating a nuclear bomb in the square; and Crysis 2, in which player must fight off attacking alien forces to assist U.S. Marines in evacuating the area. Gran Turismo 4 also features Times Square both as a photo spot and as a part of the New York city circuit which also includes Central Park.

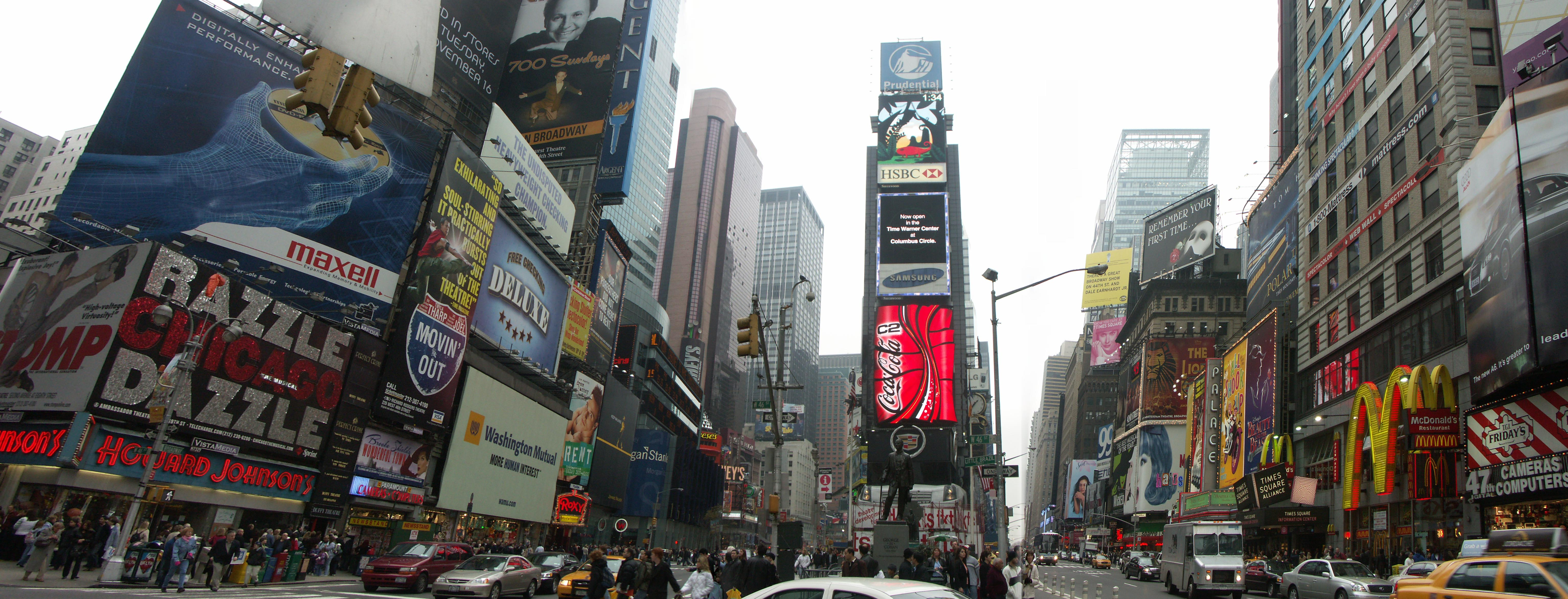
The northern part of Times Square in 2004 before reconstruction, with Two Times Square in the center

== See also ==
- Good Riddance Day, an unofficial holiday celebrated at Times Square since 2007
- Midtown Community Court, a branch of the New York City Criminal Court that primarily focuses on quality of life around Times Square
- Naked Cowboy, New York City street performer and prominent fixture of Times Square
- Piccadilly Circus
- Lincoln Highway, the terminus of which was in Times Square
- Tourism in New York City
