= Mary Cohan =

American composer (1909–1983)

Mary Cohan (1909–1983), also known as Mary Cohan Ronkin, was an American Broadway composer and lyricist, and the middle daughter of vaudeville and Broadway entertainer George M. Cohan.

Following a brief career as a cabaret singer, Mary Cohan established herself as a Broadway talent in 1930, when she composed a score for her father's non-musical play The Tavern.

Working with writers John Pascal, Francine Pascal, and Michael Stewart, Mary Cohan supervised the musical and lyrical revisions of her father's songs for the hit 1968 Broadway musical, George M!.

== Personal life ==
Like most of the Cohans, Mary was guarded about her private life. She married Neil Litt, an orchestra leader, in September 1927; they had one daughter; they were divorced in 1936. In 1940, she shocked her family by eloping with accordion player George Ronkin (a.k.a. Ranken), with whom she had three children. They remained married until Ronkin's death in 1967. In 1970, Mary married Eugene O. Fosdick, a native of Liberty, IN, in Florida. Fosdick died in 1976; Mary is not listed as a survivor in his various obituaries, implying they, too, divorced. Not much more is known about her personal life.

What is known is that Mary Cohan was adored by her larger-than-life father. The song "Mary's a Grand Old Name," written by George M. Cohan for the Broadway musical Only 45 Minutes from Broadway and featured in the 1942 film Yankee Doodle Dandy, was reportedly written by Cohan for his daughter, Mary.

Mary Cohan Ronkin died in 1983.
