= Little Johnny Jones (1929 film) =

1929 film

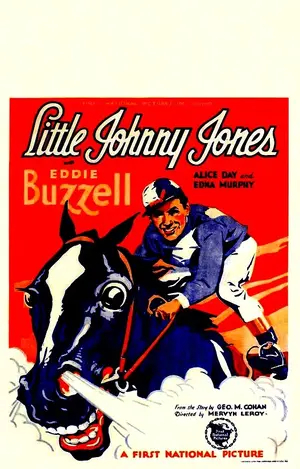
- Theatrical release poster
- Directed by: Mervyn LeRoy
- Written by: Edward Buzzell; Adelaide Heilbron
- Based on: Little Johnny Jones by George M. Cohan
- Starring: Edward Buzzell; Alice Day; Edna Murphy
- Cinematography: Faxon M. Dean
- Music by: Rex Dunn
- Production company: First National Pictures
- Distributed by: Warner Bros. Pictures
- Release date: November 1929
- Running time: 74 minutes
- Country: United States
- Language: English

Little Johnny Jones is a 1929 American sound (All-Talking) black-and-white musical film released in the United States adapted from the musical play of the same name. The film was directed by Mervyn LeRoy, who had acted in the 1923 silent version, and main character Johnny Jones was played by Edward Buzzell. The film is best known for its two Broadway classic songs from the play, "Give My Regards to Broadway" and "The Yankee Doodle Boy".

== Plot ==
Johnny Jones is a talented young jockey who rides Yankee, the beloved racehorse of Ed Baker, to victory at the Meadowbrook race. This win attracts the attention of Sam Johnson, the biggest stable owner in the country, who takes Johnny to New York to compete at the highest level. Johnny is deeply in love with Mary Baker, Ed's daughter, and promises her he will remain faithful. However, upon finding success in New York, Johnny becomes enchanted with the nightlife and Broadway, especially the glamorous actress Vivian Dale. Johnny frequently visits nightclubs with Vivian, charming audiences with his singing—most notably the song “I’m a Yankee Doodle Dandy.” A stage producer is so impressed he offers Johnny a career on stage, but Johnny chooses to continue racing.

Mary and her father Ed Baker arrive in New York to enter Yankee in an important race, with Johnny slated to ride. Though excited, Johnny is uneasy about telling Mary about Vivian. Mary accepts the truth with grace, but Vivian pressures Johnny to throw the race. Johnny refuses, yet when Yankee loses due to suspicious circumstances and a telegram from Vivian surfaces, Johnny is accused of deliberately throwing the race. Ed Baker struggles to believe Johnny's innocence, but Mary stands by him.

Vivian then coldly ends her relationship with Johnny, confessing she never truly loved him. Barred from American tracks for a year, Johnny relocates to England and works in a Limehouse pub, dreaming of racing at the English Derby at Epsom Downs. By chance, Johnny reunites with Yankee at the English course, and Ed Baker arrives, glad to see him. Johnny convinces Ed to let him ride Yankee in a surprise race for Mary's sake. Johnny wins the Derby, rekindles Mary's love, and the couple returns to America as husband and wife.

== Cast ==
- Edward Buzzell as Johnny Jones
- Alice Day as Mary Baker
- Edna Murphy as Vivian Dale
- Robert Edeson as Ed Baker
- Wheeler Oakman as Wyman
- Ray Turner as Carbon (credited as Raymond Turner)
- Donald Reed as Ramon
- Scott McKee in a bit part (uncredited)

== Music ==
- "Straight, Place and Show"- lyrics by Herman Ruby, music by M.K. Jerome
- "Go Find Somebody to Love"- composed by Ned Washington, Herb Magidson, and Michael H. Cleary
- "She Was Kicked on the Head by a Butterfly"- composed by Ned Washington, Herb Magidson, and Michael H. Cleary
- "My Paradise"- composed by Herb Magidson, James Cavanaugh, Ned Washington, and Michael H. Cleary
- "I'd Better Not Try It (I Might Like It)"- composed by Ned Washington, Herb Magidson, and Michael H. Cleary
- "The Yankee Doodle Boy"- by George M. Cohan
- "Give My Regards to Broadway"- by George M. Cohan

"Go Find Somebody to Love" was sung in the 1930 Vitaphone Varieties short "Bubbles".

== Accolades ==
In 2004, the American Film Institute nominated the song "Give My Regards to Broadway" from this film for AFI's 100 Years...100 Songs.

== See also ==
- List of early sound feature films (1926–1929)
