= George M! =

Musical about George M. Cohan

- George M! Original Broadway Cast Album
- Music: George M. Cohan
- Lyrics: George M. Cohan; Mary Cohan
- Book: Michael Stewart; John Pascal; Francine Pascal
- Basis: The life of George M. Cohan
- Productions: 1968 Broadway; 1970 NBC Television adaptation

George M! is a Broadway musical based on the life of George M. Cohan, the biggest Broadway star of his day who was known as "The Man Who Owned Broadway." The book for the musical was written by Michael Stewart, John Pascal, and Francine Pascal. Music and lyrics were by George M. Cohan himself, with revisions for the musical by Cohan's daughter, Mary Cohan.

The story covers the period from the late 1880s until 1937 and focuses on Cohan's life and show business career from his early days in vaudeville with his parents and sister to his later success as a Broadway singer, dancer, composer, lyricist, theatre director and producer. The show includes such Cohan hit songs as "Give My Regards To Broadway", "You're a Grand Old Flag", and "Yankee Doodle Dandy."

== Productions ==
The musical opened on Broadway at the Palace Theatre on April 10, 1968, and closed on April 26, 1969, after 433 performances and 8 previews. The show was produced by David Black and directed and choreographed by Joe Layton. The cast featured Joel Grey as George M. Cohan, Bernadette Peters, Jill O'Hara, Jamie Donnelly, Betty Ann Grove, and Alan Weeks.

The play was profiled in the William Goldman book The Season: A Candid Look at Broadway. According to Goldman, before the musical opened "Everybody knew how bad George M! was, in spite of Layton's directing work. The show had had its share of troubles on the road. Everybody knew how disappointing Joel Grey was too." Goldman wrote it and Little Foxes "were the "two most painful productions of the season as far as most of the skilled theatre professionals were concerned" as both "were patently rotten and got away with it" in terms of receiving excellent reviews. " A lot of bright, caring people are trying to earn a decent living on Broadway, and when crap sells, panic sets in. The serious pros didn't smile a lot after George M! opened." However while the musical was expected to run for at least two years on the strength of its large advance sale and reviews it ended up only running a year.

A television adaptation, presented as a staged reading of the musical with the performers discussing Cohan's life and work between rehearsal-style song-and-dance routines, was broadcast by NBC on September 12, 1970. Grey and Peters were joined by Jack Cassidy, Nanette Fabray, Anita Gillette, and Blythe Danner.

== Synopsis ==
Act I

Jerry and Nellie Cohan waste no time adding their young son to their travelling vaudeville act, "The Four Cohans", with sister Josie. By the time George is 20, they are playing the Columbia Theatre in Cedar Rapids, and George has landed an audition for the family with impresario E. F. Albee. But Albee doesn't make a good enough offer, and George books the act into the Adams Street Theatre in New York. There they meet singer Ethel Levey, and soon George and Ethel get married. Now George is determined to move "The Five Cohans" from vaudeville to musical comedy, and so he writes his first full-length show, The Governor's Son. The musical is a flop, but George is undeterred and opens his next show, Little Johnny Jones. After a momentary crisis of confidence, the company is on stage as George begins the song "Give My Regards to Broadway". By the time the song is over, the Yankee Doodle Kid is a hit.

Act II

George's career soars higher and higher. He is now a producer, and he and his partner, Sam H. Harris sign Fay Templeton to appear in their show, and we hear some of Cohan's most famous songs, "Mary", "Forty-Five Minutes from Broadway", and "So Long Mary". Ethel feels neglected by her high-flying husband, and the two are divorced. George is crushed, but later meets Agnes Nolan from the cast of Little Johnny Jones. Soon they are married and, together with Agnes, George writes some of his most enduring work, including the songs "Yankee Doodle Dandy", "Harrigan", "Over There", and "You're a Grand Old Flag." But George loses family members, and Broadway is changing – actors are unionizing, and Actors Equity is making demands. George first resists evolving and then retreats from the stage for many years. Eventually, though, Harris offers him a role in I'd Rather Be Right, and, lonely for the stage, he accepts. But his old style is no longer right for 1937, and George is used to being the boss, not just another actor. On stage, alone, George remembers his former glory, singing "Give My Regards to Broadway." He can still tap, after all, and his wife Agnes joins him to reprise "Yankee Doodle Dandy" before he leaves the theatre – at least he's on Broadway.

== Songs ==
Act I

- Musical Moon—Jerry Cohan and Nellie Cohan
- Oh, You Wonderful Boy—Josie Cohan
- All Aboard for Broadway—George M. Cohan and Four Cohans
- Musical Comedy Man—Four Cohans and Full Company
- All Aboard for Broadway (Reprise) – Four Cohans and Full Company
- I Was Born in Virginia—Ethel Levey
- Twentieth Century Love—Four Cohans and Ethel Levey
- My Town—George M. Cohan
- Billie—Agnes Nolan
- Push Me Along in My Pushcart—Ethel Levey and Pushcart Girls
- Ring to the Name of Rose—Josie Cohan and Bell Ringers
- Popularity—Willie and Full Company
- Give My Regards to Broadway—George M. Cohan and Full Company

Act II

- Forty-five Minutes from Broadway—George M. Cohan and Rose
- So Long, Mary—George M. Cohan, Sam Harris, Rose, Freddie and Ma Templeton
- Down by the Erie—Secretary, Politicians, Little Girl in Templeton scene and Full Company
- Mary Is a Grand Old Name—Fay Templeteon
- All Our Friends—Sam Harris and Full Company
- Yankee Doodle Dandy—George M. Cohan and Full Company
- Nellie Kelly I Love You—George M. Cohan and Full Company
- Harrigan—George M. Cohan and Full Company
- Over There—George M. Cohan and Full Company
- You're a Grand Old Flag—George M. Cohan and Full Company
- The City—Full Company
- I'd Rather Be Right—George M. Cohan and Company
- Give My Regards to Broadway (Reprise) – George M. Cohan
- Dancing Our Worries Away—Full Company
- The Great Easter Sunday Parade—Full Company
- Hannah's a Hummer—Full Company
- Barnum and Bailey Rag—Full Company
- The Belle of the Barber's Ball—Full Company
- The American Ragtime—Full Company
- All in the Wearing—Full Company
- I Want to Hear a Yankee Doodle Tune—Full Company

== Cast and characters ==
Character	Broadway (1968)
George M. Cohan	Joel Grey
Jerry Cohan	Jerry Dodge
Ethel Levy	Jamie Donnelly
Nellie Cohan	Betty Ann Grove
Agnes Nolan	Jill O'Hara
Josie Cohan	Bernadette Peters
Fay Templeton	Jacqueline Alloway
Sam Harris	Harvey Evans

== Critical response ==
William Goldman wrote about this production in his 1968 book The Season: "Everybody knew how bad George M! was, in spite of Joe Layton's directing work. The show had its troubles on the road...the problem all along was to try to warm up the central figure. George M! was one of the two most painful productions of the season..."

However, Clive Barnes, reviewing for The New York Times, wrote that while the musical "has a lot going for it", it was "burdended" by its book. "The musical is a scrappy, ill-prepared mediocrely written account of George M. Cohan..." He praised the use of many of Cohan's songs, and praised Joel Grey's performance: "Sharp as a whiplash, either with his derby tilted down to his nose, ... or his arms thrown out...he danced with a frenetic passion, and a God-given sense of timing..." He also praised Joe Layton's choreography: "the dancing is as good, if not better as any in town."

== Awards and nominations ==
=== Original Broadway production ===
Year	Award	Category	Nominee	Result
1968	Outer Critics Circle Awards	Outstanding Musical		Won
1968	Outer Critics Circle Awards	Outstanding Performance	Joel Grey	Won
1968	Theatre World Awards		Bernadette Peters	Honoree
1969	Tony Awards	Best Choreography	Joe Layton	Won
1969	Tony Awards	Best Leading Actor in a Musical	Joel Grey	Nominated

=== 1971 Television Adaptation ===
Year	Award	Category	Nominee	Result
1971	Primetime Emmy Awards	Outstanding Directorial Achievement in Comedy, Variety or Music	Walter C. Miller & Martin Charnin	Nominated
