= Canterbury-Bankstown Bulldogs team songs =

The Canterbury-Bankstown Bulldogs, an Australian rugby league team, have had a number of team songs throughout their history.

== We're Bulldogs ==
The current Bulldogs team song is "We're Bulldogs". A similar track was penned by the club in 1999, but it has not become widely accepted as a new club song. Despite the official status of "We're Bulldogs" as team song, it is not generally played at Bulldogs home matches when the players enter the field: instead, "Who Let the Dogs Out?" by Baha Men is used.

== We are the Mighty Bulldogs ==
"We are the Mighty Bulldogs" was the club's 1980s-era team song. It is set to the tune of the Marines' Hymn.

== Canterbury is the Greatest ==
Before the adoption of the Bulldogs name in 1978, the club was simply known as Canterbury-Bankstown or Canterbury. In the 1970s, "Canterbury is the Greatest" was the team song based on The Yankee Doodle Boy.
