= The Ruling Class =

The Ruling Class may refer to

- Ruling class, as a proper noun, the social class which controls politics and wealth
  - Aristocratic class
  - Political class
  - Upper class
- The Ruling Class (play), 1968 play by Peter Barnes
- The Ruling Class (film), 1972 film adaptation of the play
- The Ruling Class (novel), 2004 novel, unrelated to the play and the film
- Elements of Political Science by Gaetano Mosca, published in English as The Ruling Class

== See also ==
- Class (disambiguation)
- Elite theory
