= Donna J. Stone =

American poet (1933–1994)

Donna J. Stone

Donna J. Stone (February 23, 1933 – December 12, 1994) was an American poet and philanthropist. Several of her poems were published individually, both before and after her death, as well as a book of poetry entitled Wielder of Words: A Collection of Poems. Wielder of Words, edited by Stone's younger son, received a number of honors, and was named the American Poetry Society's 1991 Book of the Year.

Stone established the Matthew J. Pascal Foundation, a private family foundation named after her firstborn son.

== Early life ==
Donna Stone and her brother grew up near Bexley, Ohio, an affluent suburb of Columbus, in a strict family of German descent. She suffered two bouts of rheumatic fever as a child, and was bedridden for several months at a time. She had private tutors and was known to be a bright child, so illness did not impede her education. She later told a biographer that her interest in writing was born during these periods of sickness and isolation.

Stone's health improved, and she grew into an attractive young lady. She met and married her first husband, writer and aspiring playwright John Pascal, whose works would later include the Broadway musical George M! The couple had a son and moved to New York. While her husband began to make a name for himself as a journalist and published author, Donna J. Pascal focused on rearing their son and supporting her husband's career. (She also had a brief foray into fashion modeling, which was humorously described to an interviewer years later.) The Pascals' young son contracted a terrible illness. The child survived, but not unscathed, and the marriage eventually ended.

== Philanthropy ==
These difficult times saw the beginning of a new chapter in Pascal's life. She became a strong supporter of the fledgling Association for Retarded Children, thus beginning a lifelong career as charity supporter and children's advocate. Pascal's involvement often went beyond financial or administrative. One such example was her role in exposing the abuse and neglect of mentally challenged children in New York's infamous Willowbrook State School, once described by Senator Robert F. Kennedy as a "snake pit." As she later described in an interview, Pascal gained access to the residential school by posing as a recent social work graduate, and spent several days working in the "back wards." She then shared her observations with members of the press, as did several others. After a host of media attention, including the Peabody Award-winning series by Geraldo Rivera, the institution was eventually closed by the state.

Her second marriage was to L. E. Stone, a former pilot with an interest in real estate. Donna J. Stone maintained her charitable activities, expanding her endeavors to include the National Committee for the Prevention of Child Abuse. The Stones also had one son and, due to L.E. Stone's business interests, the family eventually moved from New York to a suburb of Dallas. The Association for Retarded Children also moved their headquarters from New York to suburban Dallas, and Donna Stone remained a strong supporter. Several years later she established the Matthew J. Pascal Foundation, a private family foundation named after her older son.

== Poetry ==
It was in Texas that Stone began writing in earnest. Although she dabbled in prose, her passion was poetry. Her early publications were in local newspapers and small periodicals. Later, her works appeared in poetry magazines and poetry society journals, some of them receiving honors and small awards. On her mother's 75th birthday, Stone published a poem for her in her local paper. The poem got picked up by the local's parent company, and was printed in dozens of newspapers. "Mother at 75" became Stone's most recognized poem to date.

Wielder of Words: A Collection of Poems soon followed. According to the author's acknowledgments, the title was based upon a poem written as a birthday card for Stone by her younger son, who edited the book. Included in the collection were poems such as "Another Autumn", and "Remembering", and of "Mother at 75." Stone accepted no profits from the book, and donated copies to various schools, libraries, literacy programs, and poetry societies. One school reportedly used it as a textbook, and the American Poetry Society chose Wielder of Words as their 1991 Book of the Year.

== Final years ==
The cardiac effects of her severe childhood illness began taking their toll, and Stone's health once again declined. Yet she continued to write, and during her final years composed some of her best-known poems including "Changing Seasons" and, perhaps her most famous and most personal, "Of Matt and Me".

Donna J. Stone died of heart failure at her home in Texas. She was 61. In cooperation with American Mothers, Inc., Stone's children founded the Donna J. Stone National Literary Awards in her honor. Several writers and poets, all of them mothers themselves, have benefitted from this program. Many of Stone's poems are still in reproduction. A few have been posted on the Wielder of Words website, which is freely available to the public.
