= Dorothy Gould =

American actress

Dorothy Gould (January 15, 1910 – July 26, 2000) was a vaudeville and motion picture actress from New York City.

== Stage actress ==
Gould participated in a production financed by Alice Pike Barney at the Theater Mart in Hollywood, California, in May 1926. The play, Transgressor, was written by Barney. Gould played the role of Vergie, the American girl. Others in the cast were Ruth Stonehouse and Ben Alexander. The comedy dealt with life in Paris, France, particularly the events in the life of an American girl who was there.

In April 1929 Gould appeared in Legitimate Lovers, a play written by Alice and Natalie Barney. A comedy, the theme deals with Mrs. Mucks of Chicago, Illinois. Performed by Gould, Mucks divorces her husband so that she is free to marry an already married author, Horace Littlefield. A reviewer complimented Goulds acting skills, saying she almost walks away with the show.

== Screen player ==
Gould appeared in two motion pictures. She played Ann Talbot in a Universal Pictures release entitled The Charlatan (1929). The film featured Holmes Herbert and Margaret Livingston. Her last film credit is for Ladies In Love. From 1930, it is a production of the Chesterfield Motion Pictures Corporation starring Alice Day.
