= Alice Day =

American actress (1906–1995)

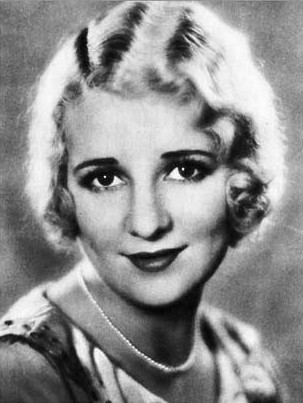
- Publicity photo of Day from Stars of the Photoplay (1930)
- Born: Jacqueline Alice Irene Newlin; November 7, 1906; Colorado Springs, Colorado, U.S.
- Died: May 25, 1995 (aged 88); Orange, California, U.S.
- Years active: 1923-1932
- Spouse: Jack B. Cohn (1930 - 1939, divorce)
- Children: 2 sons
- Relatives: Marceline Day (sister)

Jacqueline Alice Irene Newlin (November 7, 1906 – May 25, 1995), known professionally as Alice Day, was an American film actress who began her career as one of the Sennett Bathing Beauties.

== Early years ==
Day was born in Colorado Springs, Colorado, to Frank and Irene Newlin, and attended high school in Venice, California, where she was discovered. She was the elder sister of actress Marceline Day.

== Career ==
Day appeared in 70 movies between 1923 and 1932. In 1929, she starred with Edward Buzzell in a film version of the George M. Cohan stage musical Little Johnny Jones, the title better known in revised excerpts staged in the Cohan biopic Yankee Doodle Dandy. There are no known copies of the Buzzell-Day films.

Day also co-starred with Ted Lewis in the musical Is Everybody Happy? (1929) which is also considered a lost film. Lewis selected her out of approximately 200 candidates for the role. Day appeared in the film Two-Fisted Law (1932) with Tim McCoy and John Wayne.

== Personal life and death ==
On July 6, 1930, Day married Jack B. Cohn, a jeweler and broker. She retired from acting soon after the marriage, and the couple had two sons. She and Cohn were divorced on July 28, 1939. She died on May 25, 1995, in Orange, California, at age 88.

== Recognition ==
Day was one of 13 actresses named WAMPAS Baby Stars in 1928.

== Partial filmography ==
- Picking Peaches (1924) *short
- Secrets (1924)
- The Cat's Meow (1924)*short
- His New York Wife (1926)
- See You in Jail (1927)
- Night Life (1927)
- The Gorilla (1927)
- The Smart Set (1928)
- The Way of the Strong (1928)
- Phyllis of the Follies (1928)
- Drag (1929)
- Skin Deep (1929)
- Is Everybody Happy? (1929)
- Little Johnny Jones (1929)
- The Show of Shows (1929)
- Red Hot Speed (1929)
- Times Square (1929)
- The Love Racket (1929)
- The Melody Man (1930)
- In the Next Room (1930)
- Ladies in Love (1930)
- Hot Curves (1930)
- Viennese Nights (1930)
- The Lady from Nowhere (1931)
- Love Bound (1932)
- Two-Fisted Law (1932)
- Gold (1932)
