= Mary Cohen =

Mary Cohen may refer to:

- Mary Ann Cohen (born 1943), American judge
- Mary M. Cohen (1854–1911), American social economist, journalist and proto-feminist
- Mary Ann Magnin (1850–1943), née Cohen, Dutch-American businesswoman

== See also ==
- Mary Cohan (1909–1983), American Broadway composer and lyricist
