= The Way of the Strong =

The Way of the Strong may refer to:

- The Way of the Strong (1919 film), a 1919 silent American drama directed by Edwin Carewe
- The Way of the Strong (1928 film), a 1928 silent American crime drama directed by Frank Capra
