= In the Next Room =

1930 film

- Theatrical poster
- Directed by: Edward F. Cline
- Written by: Harvey Gates; James A. Starr
- Story by: Burton E. Stevenson
- Based on: the play In the Next Room by Harriet Ford; Eleanor Robson Belmont
- Starring: Jack Mulhall; Alice Day; Robert Emmett O'Connor; John St. Polis
- Cinematography: John F. Seitz
- Music by: Alois Reiser, Mel Le Mon
- Production company: First National Pictures
- Distributed by: First National Pictures
- Release date: January 26, 1930 (U.S.)
- Running time: 69 minutes
- Country: United States
- Language: English

In The Next Room is a 1930 American pre-Code mystery film released by First National Pictures, a subsidiary of Warner Bros. Pictures and directed by Edward F. Cline. The movie stars Jack Mulhall and Alice Day. The film was based on the play of the same title by Eleanor Belmont and Harriet Ford, which itself was derived from the book The Mystery of the Boule Cabinet by Burton E. Stevenson.

== Plot ==
The story starts with a prologue set in 1889 in which we see an angry husband murdering his wife's lover. The setting then moves to 1929, just as an antiques dealer Philip Vantine has finished moving into the same house where the 1889 murder occurred.

For years the house had one occupant: the butler. Vantine moves in with his daughter Lorna and maid and retains the elderly butler to help take care of the house. One night, the police arrive at the house after receiving a telephone call that a murder has just been committed on the premises. When they arrive, the police are surprised to find that no one in the house knows what they are talking about. That same day a valuable antique cabinet arrived at the house, and this has attracted several strangers to come to examine it.

A young reporter, James Godfrey, who has come to see Lorna, also arrives at the house. As the police are investigating the mysterious telephone call, a series of strange events occur. As Godfrey is helping Lorna to open the antique cabinet, they find a hypnotized woman inside. The police are then notified. When everyone returns to the cabinet they find the woman has disappeared. One of the detectives, Tim Morel, is knocked unconscious. Vantine is also hit on the head, but stays conscious. The son of the former owner of the cabinet is soon found murdered.

As Godfrey attempts to call his newspaper, Lorna is abducted and taken to the wine cellar. She is rescued by a one-legged man who suddenly disappears. Meanwhile, the hypnotized girl appears in a revived state and reveals that her partner, a diamond smuggler, has been murdered with poison. Eventually, Godfrey, assuming the role of an amateur detective, clears up the mystery.

== Cast ==
- Jack Mulhall as James Godfrey
- Alice Day as Lorna
- Robert Emmett O'Connor as Tim Morel
- John St. Polis as Philip Vantine
- Claud Allister as Parks (the butler)
- Aggie Herring as Mrs. O'Connor
- DeWitt Jennings as Inspector Grady
- Webster Campbell as Snitzer
- Lucien Prival as French Exporter

== Music ==
The film features a theme song entitled "Why Can't You Love That Way?" which was composed by Charles Bourne, Jack Val and Henry Creamer.

== Preservation status ==
No film elements are known to survive. The soundtrack, which was recorded on Vitaphone disks, may survive in private hands.

== See also ==
- List of lost films
