= The Melody Man =

1930 film

- Theatrical release poster
- Directed by: Roy William Neill
- Written by: Howard J. Green
- Based on: play The Melody Man by Herbert Fields
- Produced by: Harry Cohn
- Starring: John St. Polis; Alice Day; William Collier, Jr.
- Cinematography: Ted Tetzlaff
- Edited by: Leonard Wheeler
- Production company: Columbia Pictures
- Distributed by: Columbia Pictures
- Release date: January 15, 1930
- Running time: 68 minutes
- Country: United States
- Language: English

The Melody Man is a 1930 American pre-Code musical drama film produced and distributed by Columbia Pictures. This film is important historically as being Columbia's first sound feature to feature color. The first reel of the film was photographed in the Technicolor process. It was directed by Roy William Neill and starred John St. Polis, Alice Day, and William Collier, Jr. The story is based on a Broadway play by Herbert Fields.

== Plot ==
Earl von Kemper is a famous Austrian composer who fled to the United States: in Vienna, during his concert in the presence of the emperor, Kemper surprised his beloved woman locked in a boudoir with Frederick, the crown prince. Mad with jealousy, the musician killed the prince, then fleeing with his daughter.

Fifteen years have passed. Kemper earns his living playing the violin in a New York club with two other musicians. His daughter Elsa meets Al Tyler, a jazz musician. The latter overhears Kemper's rhapsody, the one that had been played at the concert for the emperor; he likes music, arranges it, making it a very successful jazz piece. But the music is recognized by Baden, the Austrian police minister, who then prepares to arrest Kemper. The musician then pretends with his daughter that he has obtained an engagement in Europe, leaving the two young lovers in America.

== Cast ==
- Alice Day as Elsa
- William Collier, Jr. as Al Tyler (credited as Buster Collier)
- Johnnie Walker as Joe Yates
- John St. Polis as Von Kemper
- Mildred Harris as Martha
- Albert Conti as Prince Friedrich
- Anton Vaverka as Franz Josef
- Tenen Holtz as Gustav (uncredited)
- Lee Kohlmar as Adolph (uncredited)

== Preservation ==
The film is preserved in the Library of Congress.

== See also ==
- List of early color feature films
