= Ladies in Love (1930 film) =

1930 film

- Alice Day
- Directed by: Edgar Lewis; Melville Shyer(assistant)
- Written by: Charles Beahan
- Produced by: Hollywood Pictures
- Starring: Alice Day; Johnnie Walker; Mary Carr
- Cinematography: M. A. Anderson
- Edited by: James Morley
- Distributed by: Chesterfield Pictures
- Release date: May 15, 1930
- Running time: 64 minutes; 7 reels
- Country: United States
- Language: English

Ladies in Love is a 1930 talking film romance drama directed by Edgar Lewis and starring Alice Day and Johnnie Walker. A B-movie, it was produced independently by Hollywood Pictures and distributed by Chesterfield Motion Pictures Corporation.

== Cast ==
- Alice Day – Brenda Lascelle
- Johnnie Walker – Harry King
- Freeman Wood – Ward Hampton
- Marjorie Kane – Marjorie (*as Marjorie Babe Kane)
- James P. Burtis – Al Pine (*as James Burtis)
- Dorothy Gould – Patsy Green
- Elinor Flynn – Mary Wood
- Mary Carr – Mrs. Wood
- Mary Foy – Mrs. Tibbs, Landlady
- Bernie Lamont – Frank Jones
