= James Elward =

American dramatist

James Elward (Chicago, November 22, 1928 – August 30, 1996) was an American author, actor, screenwriter, and playwright.

== Personal life and education ==
He was born in Chicago, Illinois to Daisyann Lenert Elward and Joseph Francis Elward. He was the brother to Paul Elward. A native of Chicago, he received a bachelor's degree in 1950 from The Catholic University of America in Washington.

James Elward resided in New York City. He was most noted for writing soap operas in the 1960s and 1970s such as The Secret Storm, The Guiding Light, and Dr. Kildare. He also wrote and produced a soap opera called The Young Marrieds.

Additionally, he wrote several plays for theaters in New York and London. He was active in summer stock with The Barnstormers Theatre in Tamworth, New Hampshire.

He published three novels for Doubleday under the name of "Rebecca James": Storm's End (1974), The House Is Dark (1976), and Tomorrow Is Mine (1979). He also published under his own name, including Ask For Nothing More (1984), Monday's Child Is Dead (1995), and Public Smiles, Private Tears (1982) with Helen Van Slyke, a New York Times bestseller.

In 1991 he helped to organize Mystery Stage, Inc. a group that worked to foster stage performances in the mystery genre in New York City. He died in 1996.

== Novels ==
- Public Smiles, Private Tears - with Helen Van Slyke
- Monday's Child Is Dead
- Ask for Nothing More
- As Rebecca James:
  - Storm's End
  - The House Is Dark
  - Tomorrow Is Mine

The New York Times Book Section covered his death in New York City:

The book Public Smiles, Private Tears was about a woman's rise in the world of retail fashion. One reviewer wrote, "James Elward has done his assigned (and subservient) job commendably -- perhaps even with a bit more style and vitality than the author who was dying as she wrote." The novel was on the New York Times hard-cover fiction best-seller list for 14 weeks in 1982, rising to seventh place. In 1983 its paperback edition reached fifth place on the Times best-seller list of mass-market paperback books.

Elward's most critically acclaimed play, Best of Friends, was first produced in London in 1970.

Elward performed for 40 years at The Barnstormers Theatre in Tamworth, New Hampshire. Photos of his work can be viewed here.

Other plays include:

- Mary Agnes Is Thirty Five
- Passport
- The River

Before he was an author and playwright, Elward was a screenwriter; notably for The Young Marrieds and Strange Paradise.
