= Gold (1932 film) =

1932 film

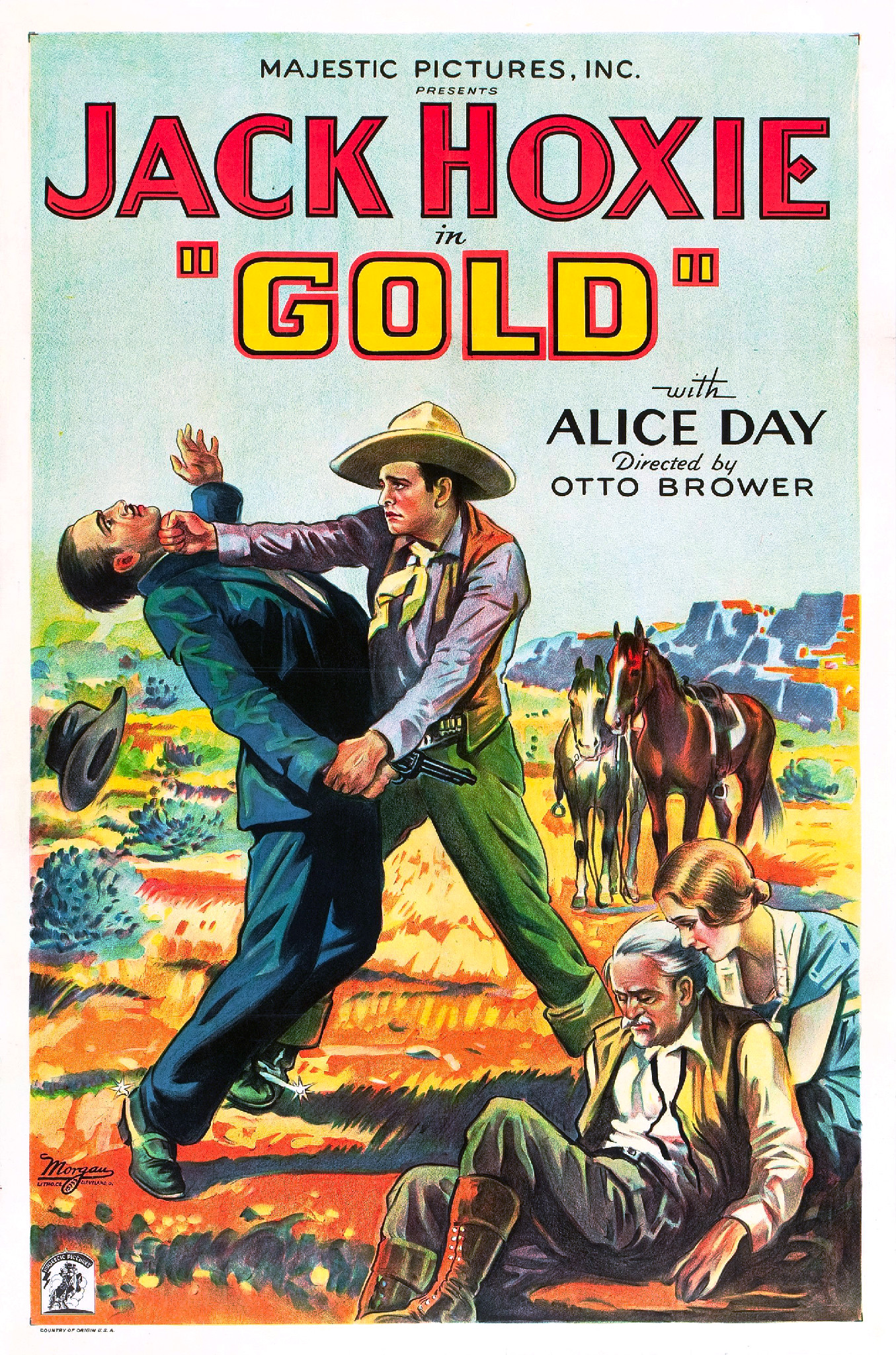
- Film poster
- Directed by: Otto Brower
- Written by: Scott Darling (continuity); Jack Natteford (story)
- Produced by: Henry L. Goldstone
- Starring: Jack Hoxie, Hooper Atchley, Alice Day
- Cinematography: Charles A. Marshall; Arthur Reed
- Edited by: S. Roy Luby
- Music by: Lee Zahler
- Distributed by: Majestic Pictures
- Release date: 1932
- Running time: 58 minutes
- Country: United States
- Language: English

Gold is a 1932 American Pre-Code Western film directed by Otto Brower. An early sound B western, the film starred Jack Hoxie in the second of his six sound westerns, featuring Hooper Atchley as the villain Kramer. The film also marked the last screen appearance of silent movie actress Alice Day.

The film is preserved in the Library of Congress collection, Packard Campus for Audio-Visual Conservation.

== Plot ==
Kramer (Atchley) works the gold fields by buying up miners' claims and then having his henchmen murder them, taking both the money and the gold. When cowboy-turned-prospector Jack Tarrant's (Hoxie) partner Jeff Sellers becomes the next victim to Kramer's scam, Tarrant decides to put an end to Kramer's gang once and for all.

== Cast ==
- Jack Hoxie as Jack Tarrant
- Alice Day as Marion Sellers
- Hooper Atchley as Kramer
- Matthew Betz as Henchman Childress
- Lafe McKee as Jeff Sellers
- Jack Clifford as Elmer Sigmuller
- Tom London as Sheriff
- Bob Kortman as Henchman Without Mustache
- John Lowell as Bartender
