= Is Everybody Happy? (1929 film) =

1929 film

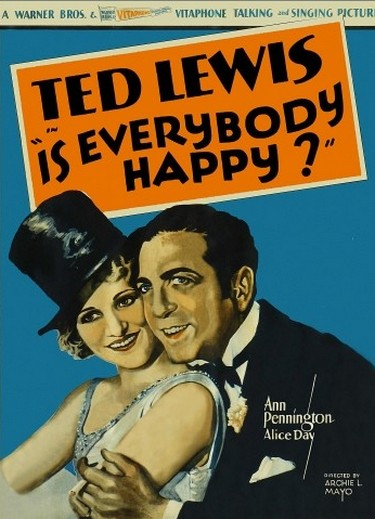
- Theatrical release poster
- Directed by: Archie Mayo
- Written by: Joseph Jackson; James A. Starr; De Leon Anthong [titles]
- Starring: Ted Lewis; Ted Todd; Alice Day; Gail Wilson; Ann Pennington
- Cinematography: Ben Reynolds
- Edited by: Desmond O'Brien
- Music by: The Original Dixieland Jazz Band; Harry Akst; W. C. Handy; Ted Lewis; Grant Clarke
- Production company: Warner Bros. Pictures
- Distributed by: Warner Bros. Pictures
- Release date: October 19, 1929
- Running time: 80 minutes
- Country: United States
- Language: English

Is Everybody Happy? (1929) is an American sound (All-Talking) pre-Code musical film starring Ted Lewis, Alice Day, Lawrence Grant, Ann Pennington, and Julia Swayne Gordon, directed by Archie Mayo, and released by Warner Bros. Pictures. The music for the film was written by Harry Akst and Grant Clarke, except for "In the Land of Jazz" by J. Keirn Brennan and Ray Perkins, "St. Louis Blues" by W. C. Handy, and "Tiger Rag". The film's title comes from Lewis's catchphrase "Is everybody happy?"

== Plot ==
Victor Molnár, once the conductor of the Royal Symphony Orchestra in Budapest, has given up his career and emigrated to America with his wife and his grown son, Ted. Among the few possessions they bring is Victor's most treasured item - a violin gifted to him by Emperor Franz Joseph.

During the ocean voyage to New York, Ted plays music on the steerage deck and catches the attention of several first-class passengers, including a beautiful young woman, Gail Wilson, who listens from above.

Upon arrival in New York, the family settles into a modest apartment. Eager to begin his American life, Ted goes in search of Lena Schmitt, his old sweetheart from Hungary, now a dancer in the Ziegfeld Follies. Embarrassed by Ted's poor appearance, Lena coldly brushes him off and leaves with another man waiting at the stage door.

Ted begins searching for work as a classical musician but is repeatedly turned away. His father, still devoted to high art and disdainful of jazz, insists that Ted only pursue serious orchestral music. When the rent comes due and they're out of money, Ted secretly pawns his father's precious violin—replacing it with a cheap copy hidden inside the original case. He tells his parents he's been hired by the New York Symphony.

To avoid playing the fake violin in front of his father, Ted claims he's too busy with rehearsals at the theater. In truth, he's taken the advice of a music agent and bought a saxophone—symbol of modern American music. Practicing in the park, Ted again meets Gail, and they quickly become friends. Through her connection to Abrams, a theatrical manager, Ted lands a job playing saxophone at a Hungarian café. He performs under the stage name Ted Todd.

Proud and unsuspecting, Victor and his wife gather neighbors to attend what they think will be Ted's debut with the Symphony Orchestra—only to find out Ted is not in the orchestra at all. On their way home, they stop in the Hungarian café and are shocked to see Ted performing in a flashy number, dressed in the operatic cape and top hat his father once wore on stage. Humiliated and furious, Victor disowns him.

Despite the estrangement, Ted secretly maintains contact with his mother. With encouragement from Gail and Abrams, Ted forms his own jazz band. Abrams urges him to hire a specialty dancer to boost the act. Ironically, the best option is Lena, who is now struggling to stay relevant. She is eager to accept the job—and to rekindle things with Ted. Ted hides his past with Lena from Gail, and even from his mother, who witnesses a rehearsal but keeps quiet.

When Victor learns that his wife visited the rehearsal behind his back, he disappears, heartbroken. Weeks pass with no word from him.

As the new show nears opening night, Lena barges into Ted's dressing room and confesses she still loves him. Gail, overhearing the conversation, misunderstands and believes she's been betrayed. Though heartbroken, she saves the performance when Lena refuses to go on. Gail steps into the spotlight, dances in her place, and brings down the house—then vanishes before anyone can thank her.

On Christmas Day, Ted and his mother attempt to make the best of the holiday alone. Ted is now successful, but the absence of his father weighs heavily. He leaves for a charity concert at Carnegie Hall while his mother visits Gail, explaining the truth: Ted's heart has always belonged to her.

Meanwhile, Lena, also performing at the Carnegie benefit, finds Victor Molnár backstage working as a janitor. She brings Ted to him, and father and son reconcile emotionally and tearfully. They bring Lena home for Christmas dinner, where Gail—invited by Mrs. Molnár as a surprise—is waiting. But when Gail sees Lena arrive with the family, she believes her worst fears are confirmed.

Lena gently sets the record straight: Ted loves only Gail. The misunderstandings dissolve, the family is reunited, and around the Christmas table, Ted raises a toast and asks his signature question: "Is everybody happy?"

== Cast ==
- Ted Lewis as Ted Todd
- Alice Day as Gail Wilson
- Ann Pennington as Lena Schmitt
- Lawrence Grant as Victor Molnár
- Julia Swayne Gordon as Mrs. Molnár
- Otto Hoffman as Landlord
- Purnell Pratt as Stage Manager
- Muggsy Spanier as Himself

== Soundtrack ==
- "Wouldn't It Be Wonderful?" – written by Harry Akst, Grant Clarke
- "I'm the Medicine Man For the Blues" – written by Harry Akst, Grant Clarke
- "Samoa" – written by Harry Akst, Grant Clarke, sung by Ann Pennington
- "I'm Blue for You New Orleans" – written by Harry Akst, Grant Clarke
- "In the Land of Jazz" – written by J. Keirn Brennan and Ray Perkins
- "Start the Band" – written by Harry Akst, Grant Clarke
- "St. Louis Blues" – written by W. C. Handy
- "Tiger Rag" – music by Henry Ragas (as H. W. Ragas), Nick LaRocca (as D. J. La Rocca), Larry Shields (as L. Shields), Tony Sbarbaro (as A. Sbarbaro) and Edwin B. Edwards (as E. B. Edwards); lyrics by Harry DeCosta (as Harry Da Costa)

The film's soundtrack exists on Vitaphone discs preserved at the UCLA Film and Television Archive. The Is Everybody Happy ? (1929) Complete Vitaphone Soundtrack, in two parts, can be found on YouTube.

== Lost American musical film ==
The film itself is considered a lost film, according to the Vitaphone Project website. A five-minute clip from the film can be found on YouTube.

== Is Everybody Happy?, 1941 and 1943 ==
Lewis and his orchestra also appeared in a short subject called Is Everybody Happy? (1941), consisting of musical numbers cut from the Abbott and Costello feature film Hold That Ghost (1941) released by Universal Studios. Columbia Pictures released a feature-length biopic of Lewis also titled Is Everybody Happy? (1943).

== See also ==
- List of early sound feature films (1926–1929)
