= Fearless (novel series) =

Teen book series by Francine Pascal

- Fearless
- Author: Francine Pascal
- Country: United States
- Language: English
- Genre: Young adult fiction

Fearless is a series of teen novels written by American author Francine Pascal, creator of the Sweet Valley High franchise. The first book in the series, Fearless, was published in 1999 through Simon Pulse and concluded in 2004 with the 36th entry, Gone. A spinoff series, Fearless FBI was launched in 2005. The first book in the primary series, Fearless, was named one of YALSA's "Quick Picks for Reluctant Young Adult Readers" for 2001.

The series takes place in the 1990s and focuses on Gaia Moore, who is a seventeen-year-old girl at the beginning of the series, and who is incapable of feeling fear. Fearless focuses predominantly on Gaia's interactions and relationships with the people around her, as well as her search for an explanation for her condition and her struggle to feel like a normal teenager. The series is told primarily in three story arcs, each of which has its own primary antagonist, and concludes with Gaia graduating from high school.

== Backstory ==
Gaia has had past strife in her family as a result of a love triangle between Gaia's mother (Katia) and the twin siblings Tom and Oliver Moore. Katia ultimately rejected Oliver and he then became obsessed with her. Katia eventually married Tom, but on the night of the wedding Oliver pretended to be Tom and raped Katia. She eventually conceived Gaia with Tom, only for Oliver to believe that Gaia is his daughter. This is later revealed to be untrue, as Oliver had become sterile due to a life saving medical operation he received as a child, which also contributed to his unstable mental status.

Oliver spent many years evading the CIA but was eventually caught by Katia's father, a Russian terrorist named Yuri. Yuri contained Oliver, who eventually overtook Yuri's organization and became its leader, adopting the moniker of Loki. He would later try to connect with Gaia by visiting her under the guise of being her father Tom and teaching her martial arts. This confused Gaia, who eventually rejected Oliver. Oliver's actions were eventually detected by Tom and Oliver went into hiding once again. It was during this time that Gaia began to show a lack of fear, which was eventually confirmed by CIA testing that proclaimed her genetically unable to experience fear for herself.

Oliver did not re-emerge in Gaia's life until she was twelve, when he tried to assassinate Tom but instead killed Katia by accident. This spurred Tom to essentially abandon Gaia in hopes of sparing her from Oliver's attentions, which would embitter her towards her father and cause her to become emotionally withdrawn and antisocial. Gaia spent the remainder of her childhood in several abusive foster homes.

== Story arcs ==
=== First story arc ===
The first story arc shows Oliver "Loki" Moore (the leader of a Russian terrorist organization), trying to regain Gaia's trust due to his mistaken belief that she is his daughter. He uses several extreme methods to get close to her and issues commands for his agents to track her movements, which continues throughout the entire series. This endangers not only Gaia, but the people around her, as she has recently begun her junior year at a New York City high school. She makes several friends, including the paraplegic Ed Fargo and the college student Sam, whom Gaia has a crush on. Her crush is made complicated by the fact Sam is dating Gaia's rival and bitter school enemy: Heather.

Loki attempts to isolate Gaia by kidnapping or killing anyone close to her, which results in the kidnapping of Sam. Gaia manages to rescue Sam from Loki's operatives, but is unable to save her best friend Mary or her foster mother Ella from Loki's schemes; Mary is assassinated and Ella (a secret operative for Loki) sacrifices herself for Gaia. Heather breaks up with Sam and begins dating Ed, but dumps him shortly after her older sister Phoebe goes to rehab for anorexia nervosa. Gaia begins to date Sam, but the relationship is constantly strained by stress placed upon Sam from his college dormitory RA Josh (who works for Loki) and is later ended completely with Sam's apparent death. Things are further complicated when it is revealed that Josh is one of four clones created by Loki. One of the clones befriends and becomes infatuated with Heather, giving her a "fearless serum" created by Loki (based on research from Gaia's genome). Unexpectedly, this causes Heather to go blind.

During this time Ed undergoes a surgery that corrects his paraplegia and Gaia manages to befriend Heather after rescuing her from a murder attempt. The characters of Natasha and Tatiana (a Russian mother and daughter), are introduced into the series and move in with Tom (Gaia's biological father) and Gaia. Eventually Gaia begins to date Ed and the two form a romantic and sexual relationship, but they become distant after Ed is almost killed by an assassin. Gaia realizes anyone she gets close to is vulnerable to assault or death.

Loki realizes he will never gain Gaia's full trust after she rejects his proposal to collaborate with him and inherit his criminal organization. His attempts to clone Gaia and create a successful fearless serum fail. After a deadly confrontation between the Josh clones, Loki, Tom and Gaia, Loki attempts to take the fearless serum, but falls into a coma. The story arc concludes with Tom also falling into a coma after partaking in a celebratory dinner with Gaia, Ed, Natasha and Tatiana. Tom goes missing from the hospital shortly after and is presumed to have been captured by a mysterious organization operating out of Loki's control.

=== Second story arc ===
In the second arc it is revealed that Gaia's ex-boyfriend Sam is not dead, but was held hostage for several months in Loki's terrorist compound, which has been abandoned. Upon being freed, Sam and Gaia reunite and return to the compound in hopes of finding a clue to her missing father Tom's location. Their search leads them to rescue an old prisoner named "Dmitri". During their travel back to New York, Sam discovers that Gaia is dating Ed, which wounds him emotionally.

Throughout this time several assassination attempts are made upon Gaia's life, which makes Gaia suspicious of Sam and causes her to suspect he was (brainwashed) into becoming her enemy. The assassination attempts are eventually revealed to be the work of Tatiana and Natasha, who work for an organization that is outside of Loki's control. It is revealed that the prisoner found in Loki's compound is actually Gaia's grandfather Yuri, the original leader and founder of the Russian criminal syndicate that Loki controls. Gaia's status as heir of her grandfather's criminal organization jeopardized the inheritance of Natasha and Tatiana (both of whom are cousins of Gaia's mother), prompting them to seek out and attempt to assassinate Gaia. Both women are eventually captured in traps set up by FBI agents, Jake (a charismatic new transfer student) and Gaia.

With help from Loki (who awakened from his coma), Gaia discovers that her father is in Siberia. She leaves for Siberia with Jake and Loki. Loki's personality has greatly been changed from the coma, leaving him a benevolent and thoughtful person with regrets for his past crimes and actions. The group eventually succeeds in not only rescuing Tom, but also capturing Yuri. The success of the operation prompts Gaia to begin a relationship with Jake, who had been romantically pursuing her throughout this arc. Gaia is left with the hope that her troubles will finally be over.

=== Third story arc ===
The final story arc introduces the Rodke family, a wealthy family that owns a well-known global pharmaceutical company. Gaia befriends the youngest two Rodke siblings, Liz and her twin brother Chris, after they transfer to the high school. During this time a mysterious drug dealer known only by the alias "God" begins introducing a new street drug called "Invince" to the New York City area. The drug causes users to feel invincible and fearless with extreme aggression and rage. While not the same drug, it greatly resembles the one created by Oliver while he was 'Loki'. The distribution of Invince causes crime and assaults to greatly increase throughout the city.

Meanwhile Gaia becomes the target of a series of attacks from unknown assailants, which her uncle Oliver and recent boyfriend Jake begin to investigate. Gaia approaches the geneticist Dr. Ulrich, an employee for Rodke Pharmaceuticals, with the hope of finding a cure for her fearless condition. Dr. Ulrich tells Gaia that he can cure her by way of a surgical procedure, which proves to ultimately be successful. This is confirmed when later on Gaia flees in terror from a group of Invince drug addicts instead of fighting them. Her relief and happiness at finally being "normal" leads to conflicted emotions when she discovers that the addicts she ran from assaulted her ex-boyfriend Ed and his new girlfriend Kai, leaving them both with lifelong scars. Gaia's new fearful disposition leaves her susceptible to psychological manipulation from Skylar Rodke, the eldest brother of the Rodkes. He emotionally manipulates Gaia into staying at his apartment for several days and skipping high school prom, which strains her relationship with Jake. Meanwhile Sam and Heather begin to date again, as Heather has a full recovery from her blindness. Ed falls in love with Kai while remaining bitter towards Gaia about their failed relationship.

Jake discovers that Chris Rodke is the mysterious drug dealer selling Invince; this in turn results in Chris issuing a citywide order for all Invince users to kill Jake. Jake barely survives an attempt on his life with assistance from Gaia. It is ultimately revealed that Chris was forced to distribute Invince illegally under his father's orders to show military research contractors the drug's potential military advantages. It's also implied that Chris's father greatly resents him for being gay and the "weaker" sibling compared to his older brother, Skylar. The military contractors who had expressed interest in purchasing Invince decide to end their contract after seeing data and evidence the Rodkes have amassed from the citywide Invince users.

Gaia is surprised to find out Dr. Ulrich lied about the effectiveness of her surgery; the effects begin to wear off, leaving her in a fearless state once again. She overhears a plan that the Rodkes are going to kill and dissect her in order to examine her DNA for the source of her condition, but ultimately fails to escape Skylar and the Rodkes' clutches. She's saved from certain death by the arrival of her family (Tom, Oliver) and her boyfriend Jake. Chris (who at this point has had a change of heart) appears and informs his brother that he's called the police and they are on their way to make arrests, which prompts the two rival siblings to try killing each other. In the process Chris tries to shoot Gaia, who is saved when Jake shields her, taking the bullet meant for her. Jake bleeds to death from the gunshot wound, leaving the police with plenty of evidence to arrest both Rodke brothers and their father, whom eventually confess to all the corruptions and crimes of the Rodke company. Oliver vows never to become Loki again, as he recognizes similarities in the sibling rivalry between Chris and Skyler with Tom and himself. Gaia is emotionally destroyed by Jake's death and overwhelmed from all the violence and destruction she's had to face over the years in the city. She decides to run away and leaves New York forever.

== Protagonists ==
- Gaia Moore: The seventeen-year-old protagonist, Gaia is extremely intelligent and is heavily trained in various martial arts. She is incapable of feeling fear, which gives her more physical strength than the average person. Gaia has dated three people throughout the series, Sam, Ed, and Jake. By the series end she has graduated from high school but leaves New York after the death of her boyfriend Jake.
- Tom Moore: The father of Gaia and D Moore, Tom is also the twin brother of Oliver. He is a CIA field agent that went by the codename Enigma, but previously worked as a Green Beret. After his brother killed his wife Katia, Tom sent Gaia away in hopes of saving her from death and danger.
- Katia Moore: Gaia's mother and love interest of Oliver "Loki" Moore, she was accidentally killed in an assassination attempt meant for her husband Tom.
- D Moore: Gaia's younger brother, D was introduced in the second super edition and has the ability to see auras. He was kidnapped shortly after birth and his parents were told that he had died in childbirth. Unlike Gaia, D has little physical abilities and is slightly autistic and handicapped. He eventually ends up living on a farm with caring parents.
- Mary Moss: A drug user introduced in the fourth book, Mary befriended Gaia but was eventually killed by Loki after he thought that she was growing too close to Gaia.
- Ed Fargo: Gaia's first friend in New York, Ed was originally paraplegic but was fixed through surgery. He had a crush on Gaia that is eventually reciprocated, but the constant danger in Gaia's life ends the relationship. Ed eventually becomes disillusioned with Gaia and her unstable and dangerous lifestyle, and begins dating someone else.
- Sam Moon: Sam Moon is a college student and Gaia's first romantic love interest in the book. He is first shown to be dating Heather, but begins dating Gaia after Heather breaks up with him. Sam is temporarily believed to be dead after his RA Josh shoots him, but was actually held captive at Loki's stronghold. He's eventually rescued by Gaia, but their reunion is strained once he realizes she is dating Ed. He does not return in the story until the last book, where he is shown escorting Heather to the prom.
- Heather Gannis: She was formerly the most popular girl at school and once acted as Gaia's rival. The two eventually make friends with one another after Heather is struck blind by the fearless serum and an attempt is made upon her life. Heather briefly dated Ed, but by the series' end she is shown to be dating Sam once again.
- Jake Montone: Jake is Gaia's third romantic interest, after Sam and Ed. He is well trained in martial arts and is very popular at their school. Gaia isn't initially interested in Jake, but begins to date him after he helps her rescue her father and put an end to her grandfather Yuri's terrorist organization. He dies at the end of the series after he jumps in the path of a bullet meant for Gaia.

== Antagonists ==
- Loki: A pseudonym for Oliver Moore, Gaia's uncle and Tom's twin brother. He contracted a rare disease that prompted him to require a surgery during his childhood, which seemed to have a negative effect on his psychological state. He eventually joined Yuri's terrorist organization and overthrew Yuri. He tried to insinuate himself into Gaia's life, but ultimately failed. He later reappeared after falling into a coma caused by taking the fearless serum, but with an entirely new and benevolent personality. It is implied several times throughout the series that the personalities of Loki and Oliver are two separate entities. He eventually checks himself into a mental hospital after the events in the final story arc.
- David Twain: Described as "Gaia's twin" and a "prodigal son". He is not related to Gaia's family but is similar to Gaia as he is biologically unable to feel any fear as well. He was discovered by Loki, who mentally tortured him until he broke David's psyche down and caused him to have a murderous hatred and intense rivalry towards Gaia. He became obsessed with proving himself better than Gaia and developed a habit of murdering any girl that looked similar to her. David is killed by Loki after he has fulfilled the extent of his usefulness.
- Ella and George Niven: The wife of George Niven, Tom's old CIA friend. She and her husband initially act as Gaia's guardians, but are actually sleeper agents working for Loki. Ella is infatuated with Loki and is enraged when she realizes that Loki was going to move to Europe without telling her. She is eventually murdered by one of Loki's assassins. Her husband George isn't trusted as much as Ella due to George's friendship with Tom. After his wife's death he becomes more and more disillusioned with himself until he is assassinated by Loki himself.
- Josh Kendall: One of Loki's henchmen, he is one of four clones created by Loki in an attempt to re-create Gaia's fearless condition. The first Josh fell in love with Gaia's friend Heather, but is later killed. All four of the clones are eventually killed by Loki.
- Timmy: A classmate of Gaia that is later revealed to be a rapist after a failed attempt to rape Gaia. He is eventually arrested for his crimes.
- Doctor Ulrich: A geneticist working for the Rodke family who managed to temporarily cure Gaia's fearlessness. He made an attempt on Gaia's life in the hopes of creating a perfect fearless serum, but was shot to death by Chris Rodke.
- Chris Rodke: A minor antagonist in the third story arc, Chris is initially a friend of Gaia's. He is eventually revealed to be the person who is distributing the destructive drug Invince as a way of revenge against his father for his homophobia and because the drug is truly harmful.
- Skylar Rodke: The eldest Rodke sibling, Skylar captured Gaia after she realized that he was part of an attempt to kill her in order to create a perfect fearless serum. At the end of the book he is arrested for his crimes.
- Mr. Rodke: The father of the Rodke children and the creator of Rodke Pharmaceuticals. He is very wealthy and tries to kill Gaia in an attempt to create a fearless serum.
- Natasha: Tatiana's mother, and, for a time, Tom's lover due to her similarity to his dead wife Katia. She moved in with Tom but eventually betrayed him and Gaia after she realized that Tatiana would not inherit Yuri's organization, as the two are actually related to Katia, Yuri, and Gaia. She is eventually arrested for her crimes.
- Tatiana: Natasha's daughter, who is behind several attempts on Gaia's life after they discover that Gaia is next in line to inherit her grandfather Yuri's organization.
- Yuri: The grandfather of Gaia and uncle to Natasha and Tatiana. He led a large criminal organization and at one point captured Oliver/Loki for raping his daughter Katia, but was overthrown by Loki and imprisoned. He is rescued by Gaia and Sam, who are unaware of his true identity. He chooses to have Gaia run his organization rather than Tatiana, as he believes her to be a better candidate. He is eventually captured.

== Titles ==
1. Fearless (1999)
2. Sam (1999)
3. Run (1999)
4. Twisted (1999)
5. Kiss (2000)
6. Payback (2000)
7. Rebel (2000)
8. Heat (2000)
9. Blood (2000)
10. Liar (2000)
11. Trust (2000)
12. Killer (2000)
13. Bad (2001)
14. Missing (2001)
15. Tears (2001)
16. Naked (2001)
17. Flee (2001)
18. Love (2001)
19. Twins (2001)
20. Sex (released in the UK as Hurt) (2002)
21. Blind (2002)
22. Alone (2002)
23. Fear (2002)
24. Betrayed (2002)
25. Lost (2002)
26. Escape (2003)
27. Shock (2003)
28. Chase (2003)
29. Lust (2003)
30. Freak (2003)
31. Normal (2004)
32. Terror (2004)
33. Wired (2004)
34. Fake (2004)
35. Exposed (2004)
36. Gone (2004)

=== Super Editions ===
1. Before Gaia (2002)
2. Gaia Abducted (2003)
3. The Silent Hand (never published)
4. The Screaming Heart (never published)

=== Fearless FBI ===
1. Kill Game (2005)
2. Live Bait (2005)
3. Agent Out (2006)
4. Naked Eye (2006)

== Television pilot ==
Columbia TriStar Television optioned the television rights for Fearless in 1999 and a pilot episode was filmed for The WB for the Fall 2003 television season. The series would have starred Rachael Leigh Cook as Gaia, who would now be a 23-year-old field agent for the FBI. The show was never aired, as producer Jerry Bruckheimer pulled the show due to various concerns and the time slot was later filled with One Tree Hill. Warren Ellis later reviewed the pilot episode and criticized it as "too unfocussed [sic] to make consistently engaging television, and I think it's the wrong composition of concepts to hook the young audience I assume they're playing for."

== Spinoff ==
In June 2005 a spinoff series entitled Fearless FBI was launched. The series describes Gaia's post-college life, where she decides to join the FBI as opposed to the CIA, the organization her father belongs to. Gaia forms a working relationship and friendship with her partner Catherine Sanders, as well as a romantic relationship with Will Taylor.

The series currently only has four books and the series was left unfinished as of Naked Eye, the fourth book in the series.
