= Give My Regards to Broadway =

Song by George M. Cohan

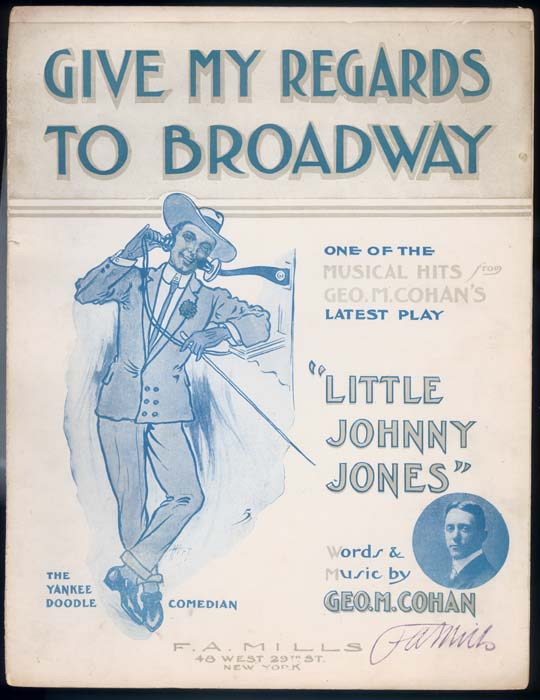
- 1904 sheet music cover

Song
- Published: 1904 by F. A. Mills
- Genre: Show tune
- Songwriter: George M. Cohan

"Give My Regards to Broadway" is a song written by George M. Cohan for his musical play Little Johnny Jones which debuted November 7, 1904 at the Liberty Theatre in New York.

Cohan, playing the title character, sings this song as his friend is about to sail to America, looking for evidence aboard the ship that will clear his name for allegedly throwing the English Derby. He is sure he'll return to Broadway, therefore signing off with: "Give my regards to Broadway".

== Recordings ==
The song has been recorded many times. It was featured prominently in a solo song-and-dance sequence done by James Cagney in his Oscar-winning performance in the 1942 film about Cohan's life, Yankee Doodle Dandy. It has also been performed by Jimmy Roselli, Judy Garland, and Patti LuPone.

Another popular version of the song was recorded by Al Jolson for the film Jolson Sings Again (1949), the sequel to the earlier film The Jolson Story (1946), both starring Larry Parks as Jolson, and William Demarest as Steve Martin.

Bing Crosby included the song in a medley on his album Join Bing and Sing Along (1959).

In 1999, National Public Radio included this song in the "NPR 100", in which NPR's music editors sought to compile the one hundred most important American musical works of the 20th century.

The song was included in the 1968 musical George M!, which was based on Cohan's life. Tony Award-winning actor Joel Grey played Cohan in the original Broadway cast and performed the song for the original cast album.

One of its earliest recordings was by Billy Murray. His recording's short instrumental interludes contain the two closing lines of the chorus to The Yankee Doodle Boy, which was the other famous song from Little Johnny Jones:

Verse 1

Did you ever see two Yankees part upon a foreign shore
When the good ship's just about to start for Old New York once more?
With a tear-dimmed eye they say goodbye, they're friends without a doubt;
When the man on the pier shouts loud and clear, as the ship strikes out...

Verse 2

Say hello to dear old Coney Isle, if there you chance to be,
When you're at the Waldorf have a "smile" and charge it up to me;
Mention my name ev'ry place you go, as 'round the town you roam;
Wish you'd call on my gal, now remember, old pal, when you get back home...

Chorus

Give my regards to Broadway, remember me to Herald Square,
Tell all the gang at Forty-Second Street, that I will soon be there;
Whisper of how I'm yearning to mingle with the old time throng;
Give my regards to old Broadway and say that I'll be there ere long.

== In popular culture ==
- In episode 100 of The Odd Couple, Felix and Oscar after being stuck on a subway car sing the song along with the other occupants of the car.
- Science fiction writer Isaac Asimov used the song as a feghoot, or elaborate story pun in his short story "Death of a Foy".
- In the episode "A Fish Called Selma" of The Simpsons, Troy McClure tells the audience they may remember him from such films as "Give My Remains to Broadway".
- One of the beauty pageant children in the 2006 American indie comedy Little Miss Sunshine performs the song.
- In Paul McCartney's Give My Regards to Broad Street the title alludes to this tune, and also to London's Broad Street railway station, which closed in 1986.
- In the song "Thousands Are Sailing" by The Pogues, a verse refers to Cohan and the song, as follows: "Then we said goodnight to Broadway / Giving it our best regards / Tipped our hats to Mister Cohan / Dear old Times Square's favourite bard".
- In the film Bring It On, a would-be male cheerleader auditions for the Toros with the song while believing he was auditioning for Pippin.
- JibJab uses this song's tune as the year in review for 2013.
- Allan Sherman used the tune for Get On The Garden Freeway on the album My Son, the Celebrity in 1963
- The Replacements song "I'll Buy" contains the lines "Hey, give my regards to Broadway / Tell 'em I got change to spare".
- In Mortal Kombat 11, Johnny Cage's Friendship move, "Dub Dub WB", has him dancing to an instrumental version of "Give My Regards To Broadway".

== See also ==
- "Give My Regards to Davy", Cornell University's fight song set to the tune of "Give My Regards to Broadway". "Give My Regards to Broadway" was published by Leo Feist.
