= The Young Marrieds =

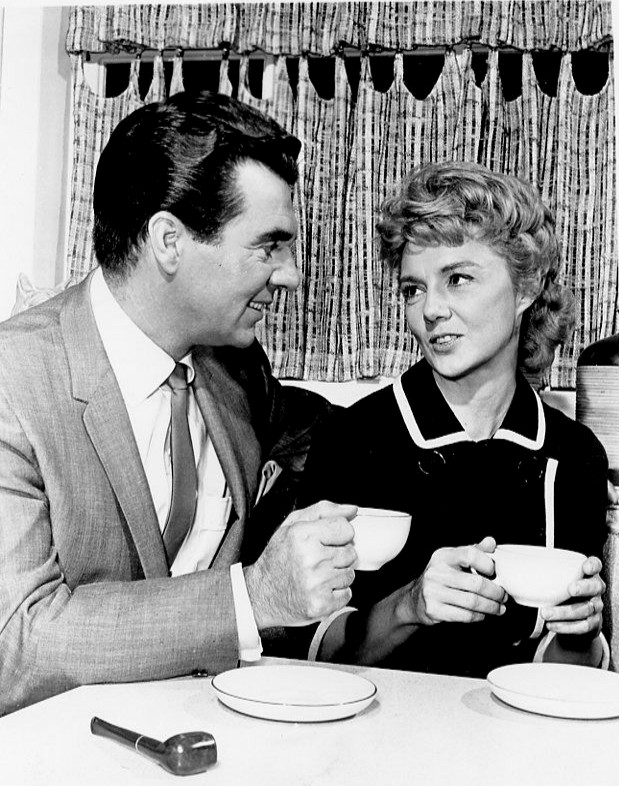
- Paul Picerni and Peggy McCay in a scene from the show.
- Created by: James Elward
- Written by: James Elward; Frances Rickett; John Pascal; Francine Pascal
- Country of origin: United States
- No. of episodes: 380

Production
- Running time: 30 minutes
- Production company: Selmur Productions

Original release
- Network: ABC
- Release: October 5, 1964 – March 25, 1966

The Young Marrieds is an American daytime soap opera which aired on ABC from October 5, 1964, to March 25, 1966.

The program was created by James Elward and written by Elward with Frances Rickett. Authors John Pascal and Francine Pascal also wrote for the series. It was produced in Hollywood by Selig Seligman through his production company Selmur Productions. Producers included Richard Dunn and Eugene Barr. The serial was directed by Frank Pacelli.

Mike Lawrence was the series announcer.

== Overview ==
The Young Marrieds focused on the conflicts between three married couples in the suburban community of Queen's Point. Dr. Dan Garrett and his wife Susan Garrett, commercial artist Walter Reynolds and his wife Ann Reynolds, and Matt Stevens and Liz Stevens, a young couple who were engaged and ready to begin their married life together.

Shortly into the soap's brief year-and-a-half run, the Stevenses were wed then written out of the storyline, which was refocused almost solely on the marital problems of the Garretts and the Reynoldses. Susan Garrett struggled with the knowledge that she was the biological mother of 10-year-old Jerry Karr, who had been adopted years before by Lena Gilroy, an actress. Susan wanted to gain custody of the boy, but Lena was unwilling to give him up. Meanwhile, the Garretts' neighbor Walter Reynolds saw his marriage unravel as wife Ann, his former model, embarked upon a career as manager of Halstead's, a successful local department store. Ann and Walter eventually agreed to divorce, but they secretly remained in love with one another, although circumstances continued to keep them apart.

== Ratings ==
The Young Marrieds aired immediately following General Hospital (another soap opera produced by Selmur Productions) at 3:30ET/2:30 CT. Though it rated fairly well for fledgling ABC Daytime, the serial aired directly opposite The Edge of Night, a top-rated soap opera on CBS, and failed to maintain enough of General Hospital's lead-in audience to make it viable. The final telecast on March 25, 1966, ended with a cliffhanger that would remain forever unresolved, as a despondent Walter, having learned he would go blind from a serious illness, locked himself in his studio with a loaded gun, apparently ready to commit suicide.

== Main crew ==
- Dick Dunn
- Paul Nickell
- James Elward (Head Writer for the first 10 weeks)
- John D. Hess
- Frances Rickett

== Cast ==
- Susan Brown as Ann Reynolds #2
- Brenda Benet as Jill McComb #2
- Les Brown Jr. as Buzz Korman
- Norma Connolly as Lena Karr Gilroy
- Floy Dean as Liz Forsythe Stevens
- Charles Grodin as Matt Crane Stevens #2
- Ted Knight as Phil Sterling
- Peggy McCay as Susan Garrett
- Michael Mikler as Walter Reynolds
- Constance Moore as Irene Forsythe #2
- Paul Picerni as Dan Garret
- Pat Rossen as Jerry Karr
- Barry Russo as Roy Gilroy
- Michael Stefani as Paul Stevens
- Susan Seaforth as Carol West
- Irene Hervey as Irene Forsythe #1
- Donald Randolph as Theo Stevens
- Maria Palmer as Mady Stevens
- Lee Meriwether as Ann Reynolds #1
- Robert Hogan as Gillespie
- Frank Maxwell as Henry Korman
- Maxine Stuart as Mrs. Korman
- Betty Conner as Jill McComb #1
- Ken Metcalf as Jimmy Dahl
- Irene Tedrow as Aunt Alex
- Scott Graham as Matt Crane Stevens #1
