= Two-Fisted Law =

1932 film

- Original poster
- Directed by: D. Ross Lederman
- Story by: William Colt MacDonald
- Produced by: Irving Briskin
- Starring: Tim McCoy
- Cinematography: Benjamin H. Kline
- Edited by: Otto Meyer
- Production company: Columbia Pictures
- Distributed by: Columbia Pictures
- Release date: June 8, 1932 (US)
- Running time: 64 minutes 57 minutes (edited TV cut)
- Country: United States
- Language: English

Two-Fisted Law is a 1932 American pre-Code Western film directed by D. Ross Lederman for Columbia Pictures, starring Tim McCoy and featuring John Wayne playing a character named "Duke". The picture also features Alice Day, Wheeler Oakman, Tully Marshall, Wallace MacDonald, and Walter Brennan.

== Cast ==
- Tim McCoy as Tim Clark
- Alice Day as Betty Owen
- Wheeler Oakman as Bob Russell
- Tully Marshall as Sheriff Malcolm
- Wallace MacDonald as Artie
- John Wayne as Duke
- Walter Brennan as Deputy Sheriff Bendix
- Richard Alexander as Zeke Yokum
- Merrill McCormick as Green, the Agent (uncredited)
- Bud Osborne as Henchman Jiggs Tyler (uncredited)
- Arthur Thalasso as Bartender Jake (uncredited)

== See also ==
- John Wayne filmography
