= List of Sweet Valley University novels =

This is a list of books in the Sweet Valley University series, created by Francine Pascal.

== List ==
1. College Girls
2. Love, Lies, and Jessica Wakefield
3. What Your Parents Don't Know
4. Anything for Love
5. A Married Woman
6. The Love of Her Life
7. Good-bye to Love
8. Home for Christmas*
9. Sorority Scandal
10. No Means No
11. Take Back the Night*
12. College Cruise
13. SS Heartbreak
14. Shipboard Wedding*
15. Behind Closed Doors
16. The Other Woman
17. Deadly Attraction*
18. Billie's Secret
19. Broken Promises, Shattered Dreams
20. Here Comes the Bride*
21. For the Love of Ryan
22. Elizabeth's Summer Love
23. Lifeguards: Sweet Kiss of Summer*
24. His Secret Past
25. Busted!
26. The Trial of Jessica Wakefield*
27. Elizabeth and Todd Forever
28. Elizabeth's Heartbreak
29. One Last Kiss*
30. Beauty and the Beach*
31. The Truth about Ryan
32. The Boys of Summer
33. Out of the Picture
34. Spy Girl
35. Undercover Angels*
36. Have You Heard About Elizabeth?
37. Breaking Away
38. Good-bye, Elizabeth*
39. Elizabeth Loves New York
40. Private Jessica
41. Escape to New York*
42. Sneaking In
43. The Price of Love
44. Love Me Always**
45. Don't Let Go
46. I'll Never Love Again
47. You're Not My Sister
48. No Rules
49. Stranded
50. Summer of Love*
51. Living Together
52. Fooling Around
53. Truth or Dare*
54. Rush Week
55. The First Time
56. Dropping Out*
57. Who Knew?
58. The Dreaded Ex
59. Elizabeth in Love*
60. Secret Love Diaries: Elizabeth
61. Secret Love Diaries: Jessica
62. Secret Love Diaries: Sam
63. Secret Love Diaries: Chloe
- Where a thriller would fit into the series, though the thrillers don't follow the series

== Thriller Editions ==
1. Wanted For Murder
2. He's Watching You
3. Kiss of the Vampire
4. The House of Death
5. Running for Her Life
6. The Roommate
7. What Winston Saw
8. Dead Before Dawn
9. Killer at Sea
10. Channel X
11. Love and Murder
12. Don't Answer the Phone
13. Cyber Stalker: The Return of William White, Part 1
14. Deadly Terror: The Return of William White, Part 2
15. Loving the Enemy
16. Killer Party
17. Very Bad Things
18. Face It
