= Edward Buzzell =

American actor and director (1895–1985)

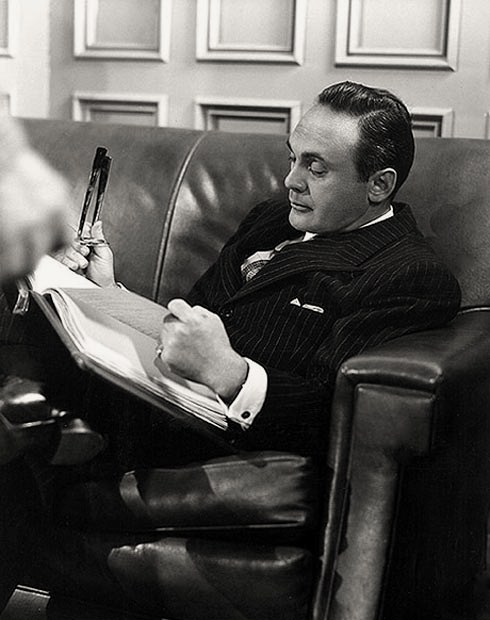
- Edward Buzzell in Easy to Wed (1946)
- Born: November 13, 1895; Brooklyn, New York City, U.S.
- Died: January 11, 1985 (aged 89); Los Angeles, California, U.S.
- Occupations: Actor, director, producer, writer
- Years active: 1919–1961
- Spouses: Ona Munson (m. 1926; div. 1931) Sara Clark (1934–1934) Lorraine Miller (m. 1949)
- Relatives: Loring Buzzell (nephew); Lu Ann Simms (niece-in-law); Harold Hecht (nephew-in-law)

Edward Buzzell (November 13, 1895 – January 11, 1985) was an American film actor and director whose credits include Child of Manhattan (1933); Honolulu (1939); the Marx Brothers films At the Circus (1939) and Go West (1940); the musicals Best Foot Forward (1943), Song of the Thin Man (1947), Neptune's Daughter (1949), and Easy to Wed (1946).

Born in Brooklyn, Buzzell appeared in vaudeville and on Broadway, and he was hired to star in the 1929 film version of George M. Cohan's Little Johnny Jones with Alice Day. Buzzell appeared in a few Vitaphone shorts and the two-strip Technicolor short The Devil's Cabaret (1930) as Satan's assistant. He wrote screenplays in the early 1930s and later produced the popular The Milton Berle Show, which premiered on television in 1948.

In 1926, Buzzell married actress Ona Munson, who later played Belle Watling in Gone with the Wind. They divorced in 1931. He married socialite Sara Clark on August 11, 1934, but the marriage only lasted five weeks. He married actress Lorraine Miller on December 10, 1949. He died in Los Angeles in 1985 at the age of 89. Buzzell's brother, Samuel Jesse Buzzell, was a music patent attorney in New York City; his daughter (Edward's niece) Gloria Joyce Buzzell was married to Academy Award-winning film producer Harold Hecht, and his son (Edward's nephew) Loring Buzzell was a music publisher and partner in the firm Hecht-Lancaster & Buzzell Music, and was married to singer Lu Ann Simms.

== Filmography ==
as Actor

- Midnight Life (1928)
- Little Johnny Jones (1929)
- Hello Thar (short, 1930)
- The Royal Four-Flusher (short, 1930)
- The Devil's Cabaret (short, 1930)
- The Lone Star Stranger (short, 1931)
- Check and Rubber Check (short, 1931)
- She Served Him Right (short, 1931)
- The Youngest Profession (1943)

as Director

- The Lone Star Stranger (short, 1931)
- Check and Rubber Check (short, 1931)
- She Served Him Right (short, 1931)
- The Big Timer (1932)
- Hollywood Speaks (1932)
- Virtue (1932)
- Ann Carver's Profession (1933)
- Love, Honor, and Oh Baby! (1933)
- Child of Manhattan (1933)
- Cross Country Cruise (1934)
- The Human Side (1934)
- The Girl Friend (1935)
- Transient Lady (1935)
- The Luckiest Girl in the World (1936)
- Three Married Men (1936)
- As Good as Married (1937)
- Paradise for Three (1938)
- Fast Company (1938)
- At the Circus (1939)
- Honolulu (1939)
- Go West (1940)
- The Get-Away (1941)
- Married Bachelor (1941)
- The Omaha Trail (1942)
- Ship Ahoy (1942)
- The Youngest Profession (1943)
- Best Foot Forward (1943)
- Keep Your Powder Dry (1945)
- Three Wise Fools (1946)
- Easy to Wed (1946)
- Song of the Thin Man (1947)
- Neptune's Daughter (1949)
- Emergency Wedding (1950)
- A Woman of Distinction (1950)
- Confidentially Connie (1953)
- Ain't Misbehavin' (1955)
- Mary Had a Little... (1961)
