= Little Johnny Jones (1923 film) =

1923 film by Johnny Hines

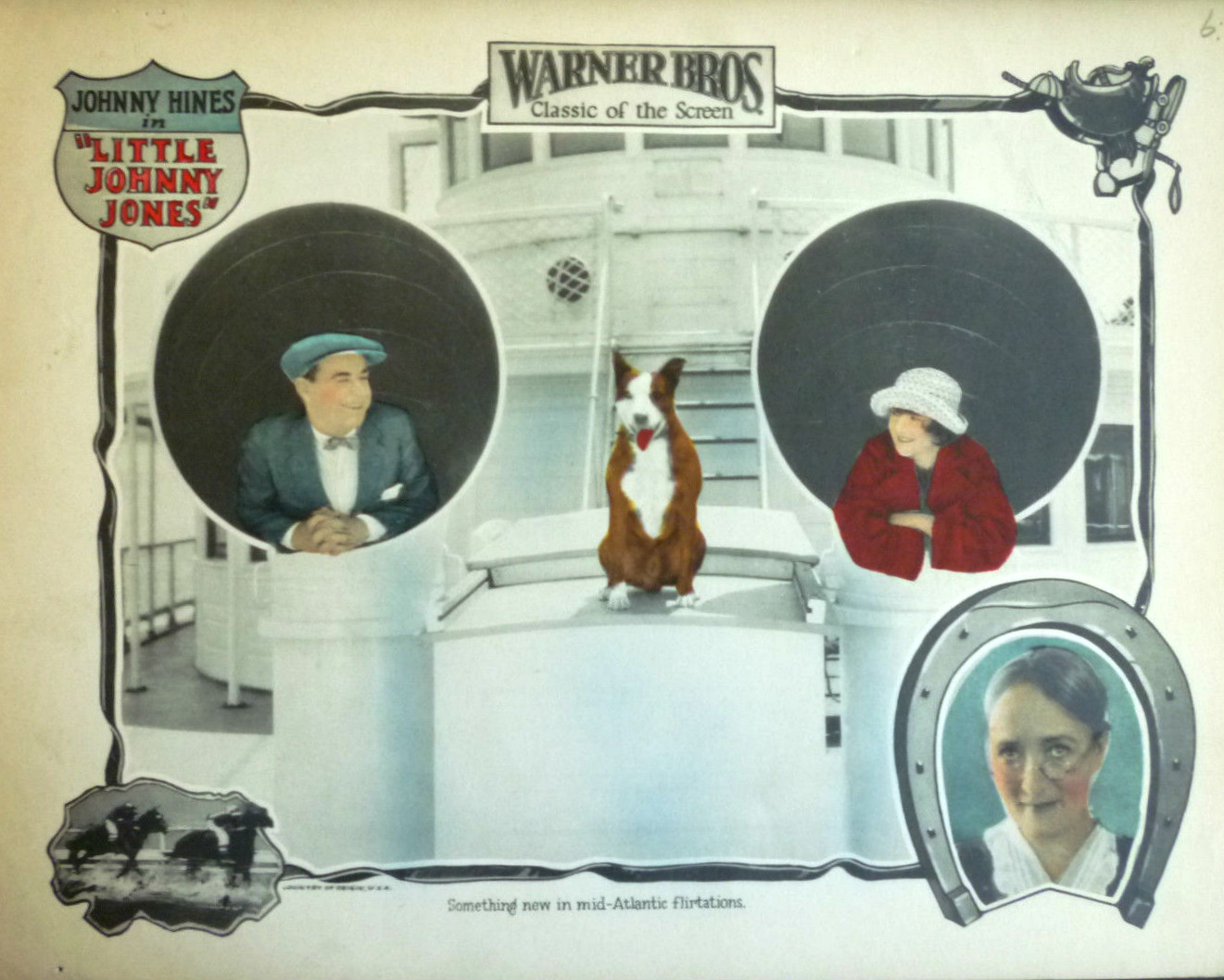
- Lobby card
- Directed by: Johnny Hines; Arthur Rosson
- Screenplay by: Raymond L. Schrock
- Based on: Little Johnny Jones by George M. Cohan
- Starring: Johnny Hines; Wyndham Standing; Margaret Seddon; Herbert Prior; Molly Malone; George Webb
- Cinematography: Charles E. Gilson
- Edited by: Clarence Kolster
- Production company: Warner Bros.
- Distributed by: Warner Bros.
- Release date: August 19, 1923
- Running time: 70 minutes
- Country: United States
- Language: Silent (English intertitles)
- Budget: $143,000
- Box office: $326,000

Little Johnny Jones is a lost 1923 American silent comedy film directed by Johnny Hines and Arthur Rosson and written by Raymond L. Schrock based on the 1904 play Little Johnny Jones by George M. Cohan. The film stars Johnny Hines, Wyndham Standing, Margaret Seddon, Herbert Prior, Molly Malone, and George Webb. The film was released by Warner Bros. on August 19, 1923. It was remade by Warner Bros. and directed by cast member Mervyn LeRoy in 1929 as a musical film under the same name.

== Cast ==
- Johnny Hines as Johnny Jones
- Wyndham Standing as The Earl of Bloomsburg
- Margaret Seddon as Mrs. Jones
- Herbert Prior as Sir James Smythe
- Molly Malone as Edith Smythe
- George Webb as Robert Arnstead
- Pauline French as Lady Jane Smythe
- Mervyn LeRoy as George Nelson, Jockey
- Nat Carr
- Brownie the Wonder Dog
- Harry Myers as The Chauffeur
- Spec O'Donnell as Freckle faced Little Boy
- Maxine Tabnac as Little Girl

== Box office ==
According to Warner Bros records the film earned $296,000 domestically and $30,000 foreign.
