= Ethel Levey =

American actress, dancer, and singer in musical theatre

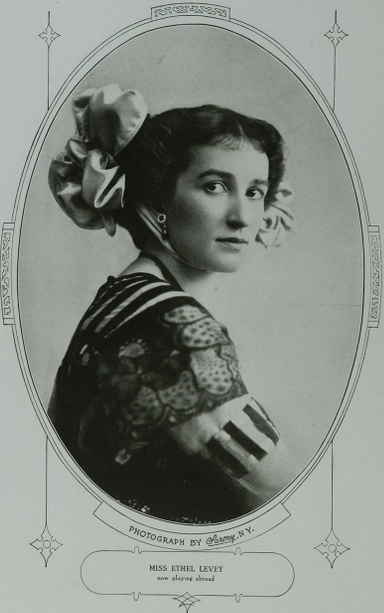
- Portrait of Levey by Sarony, published in 1910
- Born: Grace Ethelia Fowler; November 22, 1880; San Francisco, California, US
- Died: February 27, 1955 (aged 74)
- Occupation: Actor
- Spouses: George M. Cohan (m. 1899; div. 1907) Claude Grahame-White (m. 1916; div. 1939)
- Children: 1

Ethel Levey (born Grace Ethelia Fowler; November 22, 1880 – February 27, 1955) was an American actress, dancer, and singer in musical theatre and on the vaudeville stage. She was the first wife of George M. Cohan, and the second wife of aviator Claude Grahame-White.

== Early life ==
Levey was born Grace Ethelia Fowler on November 22 1880 in San Francisco, California. She was the daughter of David Fowler and Mattie McGee. Her stepfather was Solomon Levy; she used another spelling of his surname as her professional name.

== Career ==
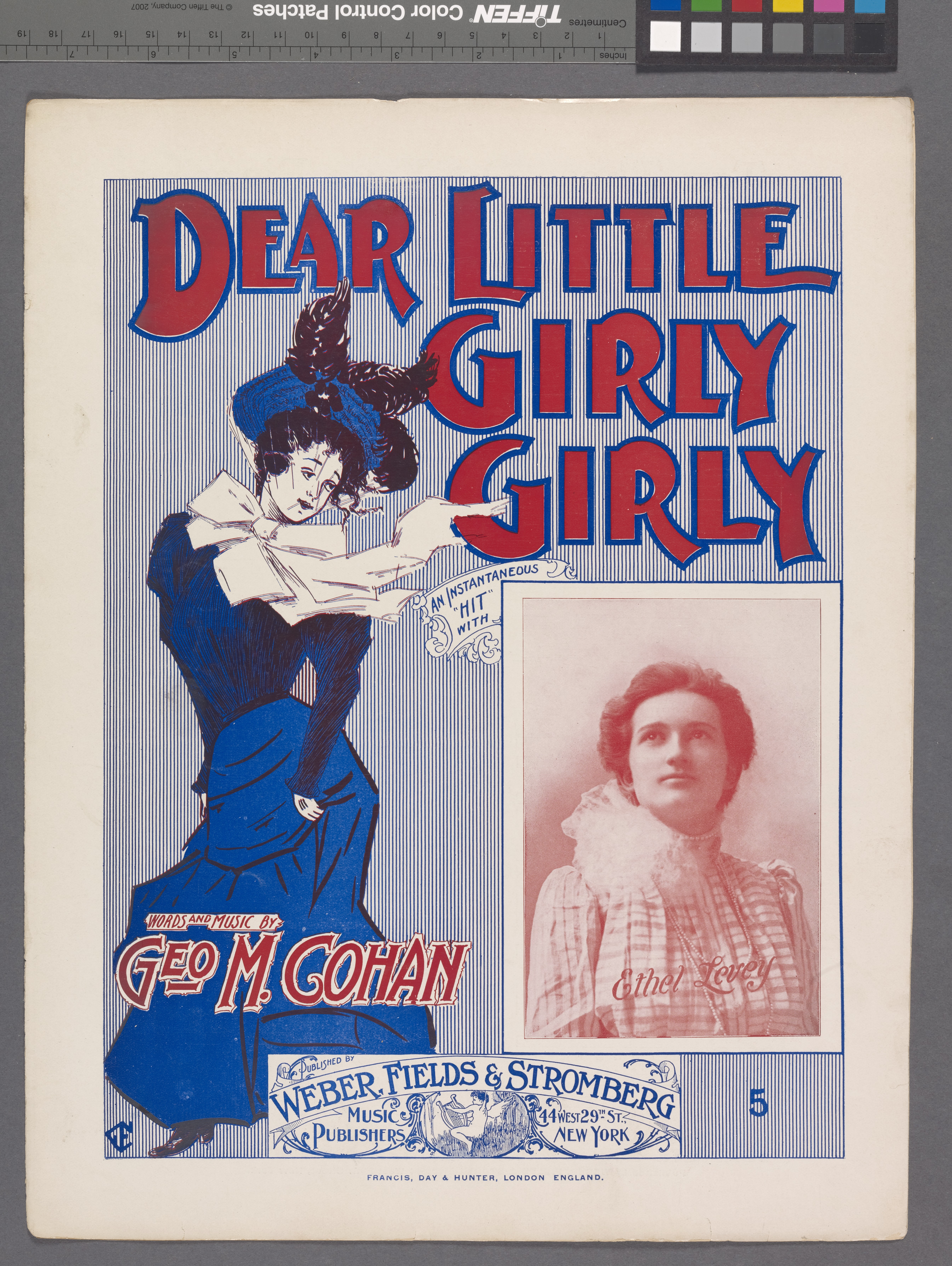
Dear Little Girly, Girly sheet music featuring a photo of Levey

Levey made her professional debut in San Francisco, in Charles H. Hoyt's A Milk White Flag in 1897. She appeared regularly on vaudeville programs in New York and on tour. After marrying George M. Cohan, she continued performing with him, in The Governor's Son (1901 and 1906), Running for Office (1903), Little Johnny Jones (1904), and George Washington Jr. (1906). After their divorce, her Broadway appearances included roles in Nearly a Hero (1908), Watch Your Step (1914), Go Easy, Mabel (1922), Sunny River (1941), and Marinka (1945). She was also seen in London, in the revues Hullo Ragtime (1912), Hullo Tango (1913), Look Who's Here! (1916), Follow the Crowd (1916), Three Cheers (1917), Oh! Julie (1920), and Blue Kitten (1925).

Irving Berlin recalled Levey's slower interpretation of his "Alexander's Ragtime Band": "I remember how upset I was at her rendition of it. The audience, of course, did not agree with me. She was a riot."

She appeared in the film High Stakes (1931) and in a 1940 short comedy, "Tattle Television".

== Personal life ==
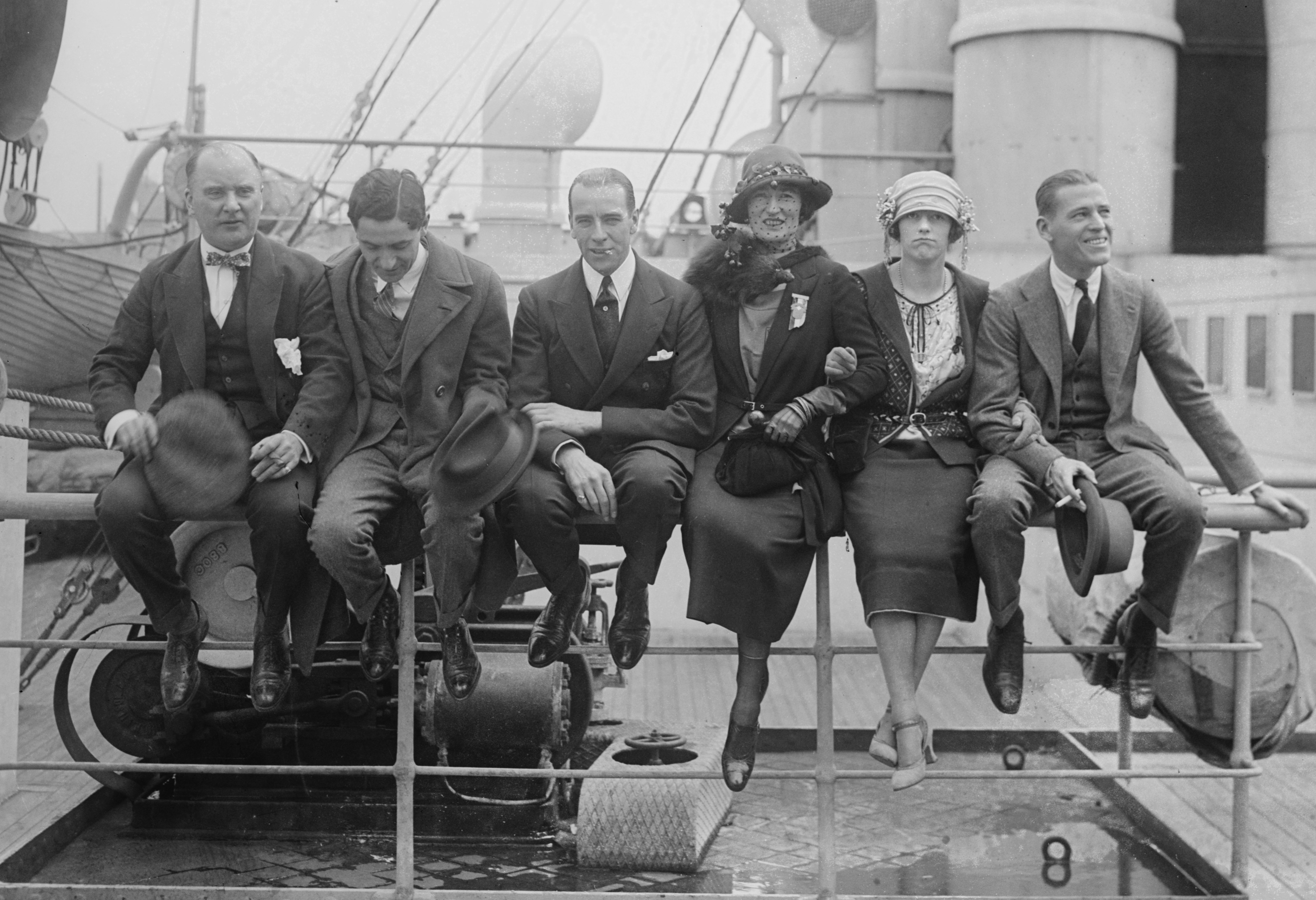
Arnold Daly, Irving Berlin, Grahame-White, Levey, her daughter Georgette, and Georgette's husband, 1921

Levey married George M. Cohan in 1899, in Atlantic City, New Jersey. They had a daughter, Georgette (1900–1988), before they separated in 1906 and divorced in 1907. She was rumored to be engaged to actor Robert Edeson in 1907. There was another rumor that Levey had married a French equestrian, Pierre Crespina, in 1910. Levey and her daughter lived in Paris before World War I. Levey married again, to English aviator Claude Grahame-White, in London in 1916. With Grahame-White, she flew over wartime France and regularly commuted by air between Paris and London. Grahame-White disliked her continuing stage career; the couple divorced in 1939.

In 1942 she unsuccessfully sued Warner Brothers for invasion of privacy over Yankee Doodle Dandy, a film biography of George M. Cohan. (His domestic life is highly fictionalized in the film.)

Levey died in 1955, aged 74, in New York City.
