= John Pascal =

American author and journalist (1932–1981)

- Born: July 8, 1932; Brooklyn, New York, U.S.
- Died: January 7, 1981 (aged 48)
- Education: New York University
- Occupations: Playwright; screenwriter; novelist
- Spouse(s): Donna J. Stone; Francine Pascal

John Pascal (July 8, 1932 – January 7, 1981) was an American playwright, screenwriter, author, and journalist.

== Education ==
John Robert Pascal was born on July 8, 1932, in Brooklyn, New York. He received his journalism degree at New York University.

== Career ==
Pascal was a playwright and screenwriter. His works included collaboration on the book for the Broadway musical George M!, which was also released on NBC, and on scripts for the ABC Daytime soap opera The Young Marrieds. With his second wife, Pascal worked on various projects including The Young Marrieds and The Strange Case of Patty Hearst. The Pascals also worked with Ms. Pascal's brother, Broadway playwright and librettist Michael Stewart, writing the book for George M!

Pascal was a novelist, as well, authoring such books as The Strange Case of Patty Hearst, The Jean Harlow Story, and Marilyn Monroe: The Complete Story of Her Life, Her Loves and Her Death. Early in his career, he worked as a journalist and an editor for The New York Times. He later developed and wrote a weekly Sunday column for New York's Newsday, which ran until his death.

== Personal life ==
His first wife was poet Donna J. Stone, with whom he had a son, Matthew. He later married children's author Francine Pascal.

== Death ==
Pascal died of lung cancer on January 7, 1981.
