= The Ruling Class (novel) =

2004 novel by Francine Pascal

- First edition
- Author: Francine Pascal
- Language: English
- Genre: Satire, Young adult novel
- Publisher: Simon & Schuster
- Publication date: 2004
- Publication place: United States
- Media type: Print (Hardback & Paperback)
- Pages: 180 pp
- ISBN: 1-4169-0126-4 (hardcover)
- OCLC: 58844188

The Ruling Class is a teen novel by Francine Pascal released in 2004.

== Plot introduction ==
When a new girl moves to Highland Park High School, she encounters a difficult clique and dramatic situations.

== Plot summary ==
The book centers on a 16-year-old girl, Twyla Gay Stark. She soon transfers to a new town and a new school in a wealthy neighborhood, Highland Park High, where the rich and nasty strut around in designer labels. The worst happens when Twyla Gay runs afoul of the resident bitch clique, led by the beautiful, intimidating and rich Jeanette Sue and bringing in the rear of the vicious pack is Myrna Fry, a "hanger-on" who is shallow, ignorant, racist and lacks backbone. Jeanette Sue and her cohorts at first pretend to be friends with Twyla Gay, until a wicked prank almost has Twyla Gay raped and killed at the local mall at night.

Encouraged by the fact that Twyla Gay likes Jeanette Sue's boyfriend Ryder, the bullying becomes even worse, with Jeanette Sue marginalizing the fact that Twyla Gay is poor. She also turns everyone against the helpless Twyla Gay, making online websites to bash her and practically chasing her out of school. Twyla Gay considers dropping out, until she runs into the school outcast, Deena, another victim of the in crowd, who has been labeled a slut. Together the two girls vow to exact revenge on Jeanette Sue and her entourage, by gathering other social rejects of the school and silently retaliating.

Pessimistic at first, Twyla Gay and Deena's team eventually learn respect, trust and to stand up for themselves, and realize that Jeanette Sue is controlling the school with her mentality and peer pressure. They break out of their fear and intimidated state and it all leads to a showdown in the school between all the students, that is everyone who isn't with The Ruling Class, and Jeanette Sue's clique itself.
