= Michael Stewart (playwright) =

American dramatist (1924–1987)

- Born: Myron Stuart Rubin; August 1, 1924; New York City, U.S.
- Died: September 20, 1987 (aged 63); New York City, U.S.
- Education: City University of New York, Queens (BA); Yale University (MFA)
- Occupations: Playwright, librettist
- Relatives: Francine Pascal (sister); John Pascal (brother-in-law)
- Writing career
- Period: 1955–1985
- Genre: Musical theatre
- Notable works: Bye Bye Birdie (1960); Carnival! (1961); Hello, Dolly! (1964); George M! (1968); Mack and Mabel (1974); Barnum (1980); 42nd Street (1980)
- Notable awards: Tony Award for Best Musical; 1961 Bye Bye Birdie; 1964 Hello, Dolly!; Tony Award for Best Author; 1964 Hello, Dolly!

Michael Stewart (August 1, 1924 – September 20, 1987) was an American playwright and dramatist, librettist, lyricist, screenwriter and novelist.

== Life and career ==
Born Myron Stuart Rubin in Manhattan, Stewart attended Queens College, and graduated from the Yale School of Drama with a Master of Fine Arts in 1953.

His early work was writing sketches for the revues The Shoestring Revue (1955), The Littlest Revue (1956), and Shoestring '57 (1956, Barbizon-Plaza, New York). He then joined the staff writers of Sid Caesar's television program, Caesar's Hour.

He met Charles Strouse and Lee Adams in 1954, and several years after collaborated with them and Gower Champion on the 1960 Broadway musical Bye Bye Birdie. He worked again with Champion and Jerry Herman, with their musical Hello, Dolly! opening on Broadway in 1964.

Stewart died on September 20, 1987, in New York City. Jule Styne said of him: "He was an extremely talented and knowledgeable man of the theater. He was one of the great musical-theater writers, and his string of hits showed that." Stewart's sister was writer Francine Pascal and brother Burt Rubin.

== Theatre credits ==
- Candide (1959) — operetta (revisions for London production)
- Bye Bye Birdie (1960) — musical — bookwriter — Tony Award for Best Musical
- Carnival! (1961) — musical — bookwriter — Tony Nomination for Best Musical, Tony Nomination for Best Author of a Musical
- Hello, Dolly! (1964) — musical — bookwriter — Tony Award for Best Author of a Musical
- Those That Play the Clowns (1966) — play — playwright
- George M! (1968) — musical — co-bookwriter with sister Francine Pascal and her husband John Pascal
- Mack and Mabel (1974) — musical — bookwriter — Tony Nomination for Best Book of a Musical
- I Love My Wife (1977) — musical — lyricist and bookwriter — Tony Nomination for Best Original Score, Tony Nomination for Best Book of a Musical
- The Grand Tour (1979) — musical — co-bookwriter
- Barnum (1980) — musical — lyricist — Tony Nomination for Best Original Score
- 42nd Street (1980) — musical — co-bookwriter — Tony Co-Nomination for Best Book of a Musical
- Bring Back Birdie (1981) — musical — bookwriter
- Pieces of Eight (1985) — music — co-bookwriter, Citadel Theatre in Edmonton, Canada and closed out of town.
- Harrigan 'n Hart (1985) — musical — bookwriter — Tony Nomination for Best Book of a Musical
