= The Way of the Strong (1928 film) =

1928 film

- Directed by: Frank Capra
- Written by: William M. Conselman (story); Peter Milne
- Produced by: Harry Cohn
- Starring: Mitchell Lewis; Alice Day; William Norton Bailey
- Cinematography: Ben F. Reynolds
- Production company: Columbia Pictures
- Distributed by: Columbia Pictures
- Release date: June 19, 1928
- Running time: 61 minutes
- Country: United States
- Language: Silent (English intertitles)

The Way of the Strong is a 1928 American silent crime drama film directed by Frank Capra. It was produced by Harry Cohn for Columbia Pictures.

== Synopsis ==
The Way of the Strong (1928)

Handsome Williams is a bootlegger who takes in the down-and-out Nora. Nora eventually finds herself in the middle of a gang war between Williams and his chief rival, Tiger Louie.

== Cast ==
- Mitchell Lewis - Handsome Williams
- Alice Day - Nora
- Margaret Livingston - Marie
- Theodore von Eltz - Dan
- William Norton Bailey - Tiger Louie
- Willie Fung - Chinese Cook (uncredited)
- Jack Perry - one of Handsome's henchmen (uncredited)
- Blackie Whiteford - one of Handsome's henchmen (uncredited)

== Preservation ==
The film survives through a print held in the collection of Sony Pictures Entertainment (formerly called Columbia Pictures Entertainment). Complete copies of the film are also held at the Cinematheque Royale de Belgique and the Danish Film Institute.
