= Francine Pascal =

American author (1932–2024)

- Born: Francine Paula Rubin; May 13, 1932; New York City, U.S.
- Died: July 28, 2024 (aged 92); New York City, U.S.
- Education: New York University
- Occupation: Writer
- Spouses: Jerome Offenberg (m. 1958; div. 1963); John Pascal (m. 1965; died 1981)
- Children: 3
- Relatives: Michael Stewart (brother)
- Writing career
- Genre: Young adult fiction
- Notable work: Sweet Valley High

Francine Paula Pascal (née Rubin, May 13, 1932 – July 28, 2024) was an American author best known for her Sweet Valley series of young adult novels. Sweet Valley High, the backbone of the collection, was made into a television series, which led to several spin-offs, including The Unicorn Club and Sweet Valley University. Although most of these books were published in the 1980s and 1990s, they remained so popular that several titles were re-released decades later.

== Early life and education ==
Francine Paula Rubin was born on May 13, 1932, in Manhattan, New York, and raised in Jamaica, Queens, New York. She was the daughter of Kate (Dunitz) and William Rubin, an auctioneer. Her family was Jewish. She studied journalism at New York University and began her career writing for magazines, including Cosmopolitan, Ladies' Home Journal, Modern Screen, and True Confessions.

In 1958, she married Jerome Offenberg until divorcing in 1963. In 1964, she married John Pascal until his death in 1981.

== Writing career ==
Francine and John Pascal were hired as writers for the soap opera The Young Marrieds. They left the show after being asked to leave New York for Los Angeles to continue working. The couple later wrote a Broadway musical, George M!, with her brother Michael Stewart.

Pascal's first novel, Hangin' Out With Cici (1977), was later turned into an ABC Afterschool Special, My Mother Was Never a Kid. Around this time, she aspired to create a soap opera, but struggled to come up with an idea. One day, a friend who worked in publishing gave her the idea for a series aimed at teenagers, which Pascal immediately responded to and developed as a book. This became the successful Sweet Valley High series, set in the fictitious Southern California town of Sweet Valley. After writing the first seven books herself, she oversaw a team of ghostwriters to expand the series. Sweet Valley High continued in numerous iterations until 2003, and was briefly revived with the novel Sweet Valley Confidential in 2011.

Pascal later developed other work, including the Fearless series, Save Johanna! (1981) and The Ruling Class.

== Personal life ==
Pascal had three children from her marriage to Offenberg. Her daughter, Jamie Stewart Carmen, was an NBC producer who died in 2008.

John Pascal died of lung cancer in 1981. Francine Pascal later wrote the novel If Wishes Were Horses (1994), a work of autofiction about her marriage and widowhood, in which the protagonist moves to France following the death of her husband.

Pascal died of lymphoma at NewYork-Presbyterian Hospital on July 28, 2024, at the age of 92.

== See also ==
- List of Sweet Valley High books
- List of Sweet Valley High episodes
- List of Sweet Valley University novels

== Sources ==
- The Continuum Encyclopedia of Children's Literature (Continuum International Publishing Group, 2005)
- The 100 Most Popular Young Adult Authors: Biographical Sketches and Bibliographies (Bernard A. Drew: Libraries Unlimited, 1997)
- The Season: A Candid Look at Broadway (William Goldman: Harcourt, Brace & World, 1969)
- George M! (Book by Michael Stewart, John Pascal, and Francine Pascal: Tams-Witmark, 1968; National Broadcasting Co., 1970)
- Hello, Dolly! (Book by Michael Stewart and Jerry Herman: Signet Books, 1964)
- Bye Bye Birdie (Book by Michael Stewart: DBS Publications, Inc., 1962)
- Carnival! (Book by Michael Stewart: DBS Publications, Inc., 1968)
- Mack & Mabel: A Musical Love Story (Book by Michael Stewart, Samuel French, Inc., 1976)
- The Strange Case of Patty Hearst (John Pascal and Francine Pascal: Signet Books, 1974) ASIN B0006W21ZY
- The Young Marrieds (John Pascal and Francine Pascal: American Broadcasting Co., 1964–1966)
- Hangin' Out with Cici (Francine Pascal: Pocket Books, 1977)
- My Mother Was Never a Kid Afterschool Special (Original Title: Hangin' Out with Cici – Book by Francine Pascal, Screenplay by Jeffrey Kindley: American Broadcasting Co., 1981)
- My First Love and Other Disasters (Francine Pascal: Dell, 1980)
- Love and Betrayal & Hold the Mayo (Francine Pascal: Viking Press, 1985)
- The Hand-Me-Down Kid (Francine Pascal: Viking Press, 1980)
- The Hand-Me-Down Kid Afterschool Special (Book by Francine Pascal, Screenplay by Judy Engles: American Broadcasting Co., 1983)
- Save Johanna!. Penguin Group. 1982. ISBN 978-0-425-05300-3. OL 4255900M.
- If Wishes Were Horses (Francine Pascal: Crown, 1994)
- La Villa (Re-release of If Wishes Were Horses – Francine Pascal: Pocket Star, 2004)
- The Ruling Class (Francine Pascal: Simon & Schuster, 2004)
- Caitlin Trilogy Book Series (Created by Francine Pascal: Bantam Starfire, 1985–1988)
- Sweet Valley Book Series (Created by Francine Pascal: Random House, 1983–2009)
- Sweet Valley Television Series (Created by Francine Pascal: Saban Entertainment, 1994–1997)
- Fearless Book Series (Created by Francine Pascal: Simon & Schuster, 2000–2003)
- Fearless: FBI Book Series (Created by Francine Pascal: Simon & Schuster, 2005–2006)
- Fearless Television Series (Never Released – Created by Francine Pascal: Warner Bros. Television and Jerry Bruckheimer Television, 2004)
- Amazon Books (Amazon Services, LLC, 2009)
- Fantastic Fiction Limited, Lancashire, UK
- Little Crew of Butchers. CreateSpace Independent Publishing Platform. 2017. ISBN 978-1-5482-1317-6. OL 44281796M.
