= Little Johnny Jones =

1904 musical by George M. Cohan

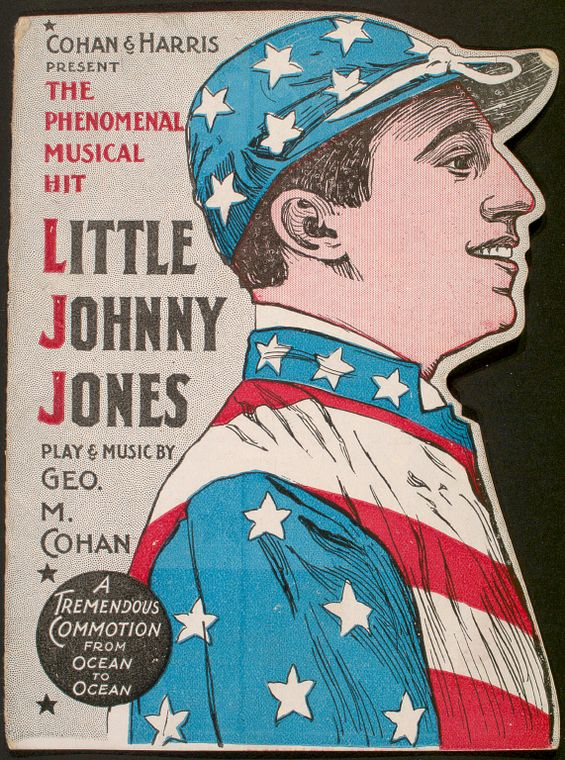
- Pamphlet, 1907
- Music: George M. Cohan
- Lyrics: George M. Cohan
- Book: George M. Cohan
- Productions: 1904 Broadway; 1982 Broadway revival

Little Johnny Jones is a musical by George M. Cohan. The show introduced Cohan's tunes "Give My Regards to Broadway" and "The Yankee Doodle Boy." The Johnny Jones character was inspired by real-life Hall of Fame jockey Tod Sloan.

== Background ==
The show was Cohan's first full-length musical. A famous American jockey, Tod Sloan, had gone to England in 1903 to ride in the Derby for King Edward VII. This gave Cohan the idea for the story. The musical is patriotic in tone and contains a number of quips aimed at European targets, such as, "You think I'd marry an heiress and live off her money? What do you take me for? An Englishman?" and, "French pastry ain't worth 30¢ compared to American apple pie." (30 cents in 1904 is equal to $10.75 today) In Little Johnny Jones, Cohan introduced some of the dance steps and comedy features for which he would become famous.

This musical is credited as the first American musical, albeit with several rivals to the title such as The Black Crook and Evangeline.

== Characters ==
For clarity, only the principal speaking parts are listed.

Lead

- Goldie Gates is Johnny's American sweetheart, who disguises herself as a French girl and as her own fiance.
- Johnny Jones is an American jockey who travels to England to ride in the Derby.
- Henry Hapgood is a friend of Goldie and Johnny, who helps the former follow the latter.
- Timothy D. McGee is an American ward boss and stable owner, trying to hire Johnny.
- Florabelle Fly is a newspaper reporter for the San Francisco Searcher, who sees all and knows all.

Supporting

- Anthony Anstey is an older crooked gambler from Chinatown, San Francisco, engaged to Mrs Kenworth.
- Mrs. Andrew Kenworth called Annette, is a very wealthy San Francisco widow, aunt to Goldie, a social reformer.
- Whitney Wilson is a comical American detective, hired by Johnny to get the goods on Anstey. (Note: Theatre programs and newspaper reviews of the time labelled this character as "The Unknown".)
- Sing Song is the editor of the Pekin Gazette, in a secret alliance with Anstey over the Chinese lottery.
- Jenkins is the "starter" (Note: The term as used in the play is a hotel employee who provides buggies to residents who want to drive themselves and summons hansom cabs for others.) at the Cecil Hotel.
- Capt. Squirvey is master of the American line SS St. Hurrah, a bewhiskered fan of Gilbert & Sullivan.

Featured

- Bessie is an American girl visiting England with other girls. The published play refers to her as "First Girl".
- Bellboy takes and delivers messages at the Cecil Hotel.
- Inspector Perkins is looking for the fake Earl of Bloomsbury but switches sides upon recognizing Wilson.
- Stevens is a waiter at the Cecil Hotel.
- Chung Fow is Sing Song's henchman, who is ordered to kidnap Goldie Gates, but doesn't.

== Synopsis ==
Settings: Act I - Courtyard of Cecil Hotel, London; Act II - American Line dock at Southampton; Act III - Chinatown, San Francisco

A brash, patriotic American jockey, Johnny Jones, goes to England to ride his horse, Yankee Doodle, in the English Derby. Jones falls in love with Goldie Gates, a San Francisco copper heiress, who follows him to Britain, disguising herself as a man to discover if Jones really loves her. Anthony Anstey, an American who runs a Chinese gambling establishment in San Francisco, offers Jones a bribe to lose the race deliberately, but he refuses. After Jones loses, Anstey spreads rumors that he threw the race intentionally. Jones' detective, pretending to be a drunkard, searches for evidence to clear Johnny's name and finds out that it was Anstey that framed Jones. Jones tells his friends who are returning to America, "Give My Regards to Broadway," but he stays in London to try to regain his reputation. Jones returns to America with his name cleared, eager to propose marriage to Goldie, but he finds that Anstey has kidnapped her. He and his detective search for her in San Francisco's Chinatown, eventually finding her.

== Original production ==
Little Johnny Jones was produced by Sam H. Harris and directed by George M. Cohan, who also performed in it. Other members of The Four Cohans in the cast were his parents, and his then wife Ethel Levey, who had replaced Cohan's sister Josie in the family act.

=== Cast ===
Cast lists were not a usual feature of theater reviews in 1904-1905, so the following is dependent on a few exceptions.

Role	Actor	Dates	Notes
Goldie Gates	Ethel Levey	Oct 1904 – Dec 1905	
Johnny Jones	George M. Cohan	Oct 1904 – Dec 1905	
Henry Hapgood	Donald Brian	Oct 1904 – Jun 1905	His character disguises himself as Leslie, valet to the Earl of Bloomsbury
Henry Hapgood	William D. Meehan	Jun 1905 – Dec 1905	
Timothy D. McGee	Sam J. Ryan	Oct 1904 – Dec 1905	
Florabelle Fly	Truly Shattuck	Oct 1904 – Jul 1905	
Florabelle Fly	Adele Rafter	Jul 1905 – Dec 1905	
Anthony Anstey	Jerry J. Cohan	Oct 1904 – Dec 1905	
Mrs. Andrew Kenworth	Helen F. Cohan	Oct 1904 – Dec 1905	
Whitney Wilson	Tom Lewis	Oct 1904 – Dec 1905	Lewis' role was easily the most popular character with audiences and reviewers.
Sing Song	J. Bernard Dyllin	Oct 1904 – May 1905	
Sing Song	Charles Bachmann	May 1905 – Dec 1905	Bachmann originally played Inspector Perkins but took over this role when Dyllin left.
Jenkins / Capt. Squirvey	C. J. Harrington	Oct 1904 – Dec 1905	Harrington played two roles, as a Cecil Hotel starter in Act I and a ship's captain in Act II.
Bessie	Edith Tyler	Oct 1904 – Dec 1905	
Bellboy	William Seymour	Oct 1904 – Dec 1905	
Stevens	Joseph Leslie	Oct 1904 – Dec 1905	
Inspector Perkins	Charles Bachmann	Oct 1904 – May 1905	
Inspector Perkins	Fred Wolcott	May 1905 – Dec 1905	
Chung Fow	Howard Stevens	Oct 1904 – Jun 1905	
Chung Fow	Harry Kittridge	Jun 1905 – Dec 1905	

=== Tryouts ===
The musical was first tried out at the Parsons Theatre in Hartford, Connecticut on October 10, 1904, moving to the Shubert Hyperion Theatre in New Haven, Connecticut three days later. It opened at the Walnut Street Theatre in Philadelphia on October 17, 1904 for a two-week engagement, then finished its tryout period at the Grand Opera House in Wilmington, Delaware starting October 31, 1904.

=== Broadway and tours ===
Little Johnny Jones opened on Broadway at the Liberty Theatre on November 7, 1904. The first Broadway run of only 52 performances was followed by tours, during which some rewrites were made. One of these was a new song Life's a Funny Proposition After All, added to the finale in May 1905. Little Johnny Jones was revived twice in 1905 at the New York Theatre, playing successfully for over 200 performances through most of that year, and touring until the next Broadway revival in 1907 for a short run at the Academy of Music. The production was mounted with a huge cast.

== Subsequent adaptations and productions ==
Little Johnny Jones was adapted twice for the motion pictures, first as a silent film released in 1923 by Warner Bros. First National followed this in 1929 with an early talkie musical version directed by Mervyn LeRoy, who played a bit part in the 1923 film. Eddie Buzzell, who co-wrote the screenplay with Adelaide Heilbron, played the title role. Only two of Cohan's original songs survived the transition to the screen ("Give My Regards To Broadway" and "Yankee Doodle Boy"). The five other tunes in the film's score were contributed by various other songwriters, mainly Herb Magidson and Michael H. Cleary.

James Cagney appeared in a play-within-a-play staging of numbers and dances from Little Johnny Jones in the 1942 film, Yankee Doodle Dandy.

David Cassidy starred in a touring revival in 1981. After previewing at Connecticut's Goodspeed Opera House, being recorded for broadcast on Showtime, and touring, a 1982 revival, adapted by Alfred Uhry and starring Donny Osmond in the lead closed at the Alvin Theatre after only one performance.

An adaptation of the show was produced by the Light Opera of Manhattan in the late 1980s, called Give My Regards to Broadway and was successful for that company.

== Song list ==
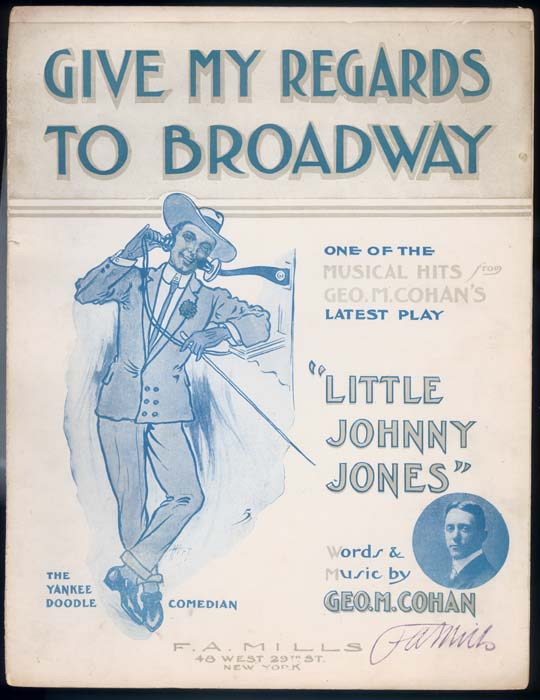
Sheet music to "Give My Regards"

- The Cecil in London – Jenkins
- They're All My Friends – Timothy D. McGee
- Mam'selle Fauchette – Goldie Gates
- 'Op in the 'Ansom – Cabbies and Reformers
- Nesting in a New York Tree – Florabelle Fly
- The Yankee Doodle Boy – Johnny Jones
- Off to the Derby – Company
- Girls from the U.S.A. – Florabelle Fly
- Sailors of St. Hurrah – Sailors
- Captain of a Ten Day Boat – Captain Squirvy
- Goodbye Flo – Goldie Gates
- Good Old California – Henry Hapgood
- A Girl I Know – Johnny Jones and Goldie Gates
- Give My Regards to Broadway – Johnny Jones
- March of the Frisco Chinks – Company
- Life's a Funny Proposition After All – Johnny Jones
