= Yankee Doodle Dandy =

1942 film by Michael Curtiz

Yankee Doodle Dandy (film)
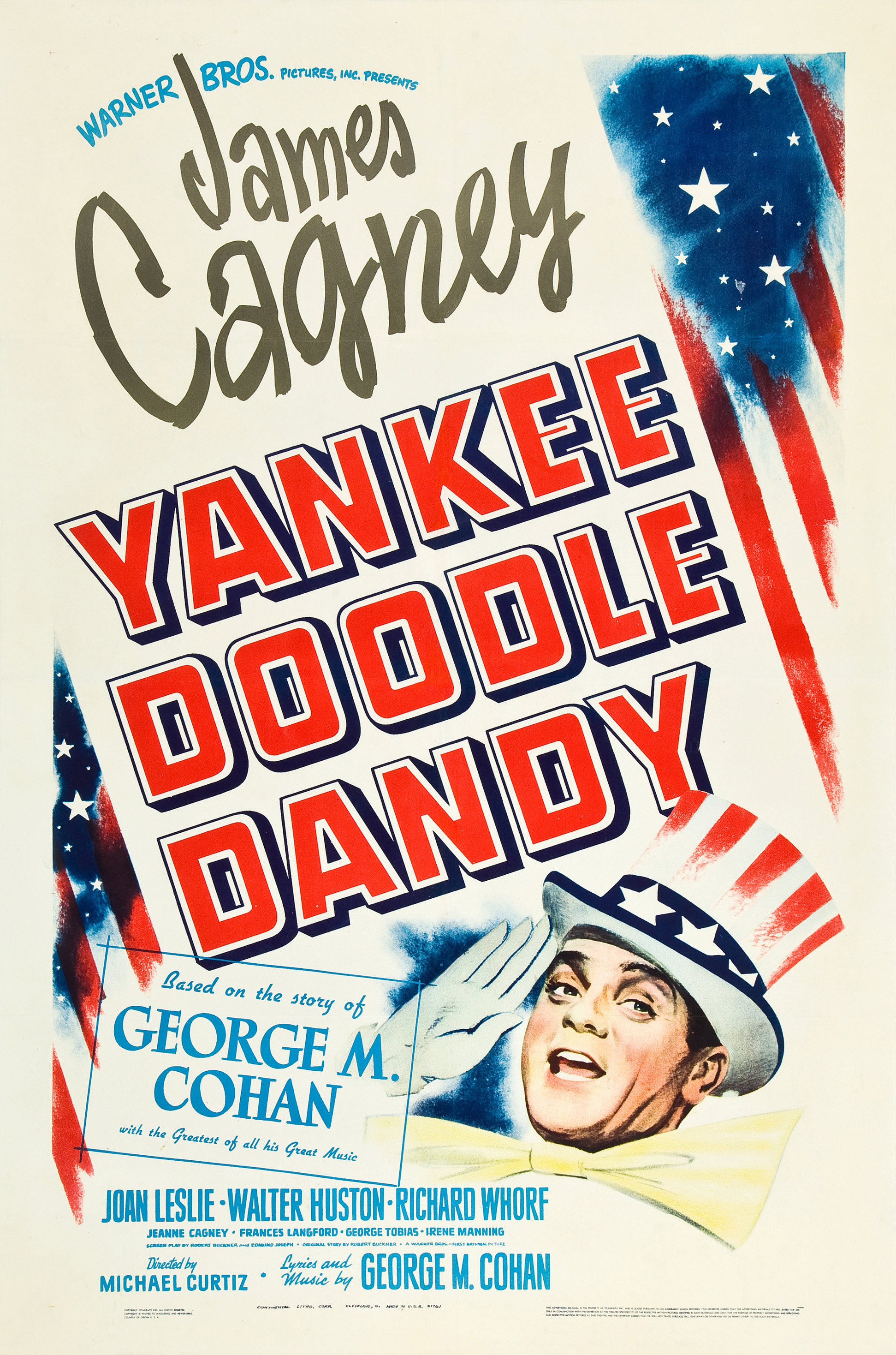
- Theatrical release poster by Bill Gold
- Directed by: Michael Curtiz
- Written by: Robert Buckner; Edmund Joseph
- Produced by: Hal B. Wallis; Jack L. Warner
- Starring: James Cagney; Joan Leslie; Walter Huston; Richard Whorf
- Cinematography: James Wong Howe
- Edited by: George Amy
- Music by: Score and songs George M. Cohan; Score adaptation: Ray Heindorf; Heinz Roemheld
- Distributed by: Warner Bros. Pictures
- Release date: May 29, 1942 (New York City)
- Running time: 126 minutes
- Country: United States
- Language: English
- Budget: $1.5 million
- Box office: $6.5 million

Yankee Doodle Dandy is a 1942 American biographical musical drama film about George M. Cohan. It stars James Cagney, Joan Leslie, Walter Huston, and Richard Whorf, and features Irene Manning, George Tobias, Rosemary DeCamp, Jeanne Cagney, and Vera Lewis. Joan Leslie's singing voice was partially dubbed by Sally Sweetland.

The film was written by Robert Buckner and Edmund Joseph, and directed by Michael Curtiz. According to the special edition DVD, significant and uncredited improvements were made to the script by the twin brothers Julius J. Epstein and Philip G. Epstein. The film was a major hit for Warner Bros. Pictures, and was nominated for eight Academy Awards, including Best Picture, winning three.

In 1993, Yankee Doodle Dandy was selected for preservation in the United States National Film Registry by the Library of Congress as being "culturally, historically, or aesthetically significant", and in 1998, the film was included on the American Film Institute's 100 Years...100 Movies list, a compilation of the 100 greatest films in American cinema, ranking number 100.

== Plot ==
In the early days of World War II, George M. Cohan comes out of retirement to star as President Roosevelt in the Rodgers and Hart musical I'd Rather Be Right. On the show's first night, he is summoned to the White House to meet the President, who presents him with a Congressional Gold Medal. Cohan is overcome and chats with Roosevelt, recalling his early days on the stage.

The film flashes back to Cohan's supposed July 4 birth while his father is performing on the vaudeville stage.

Cohan and his sister join the family act as soon as they learn to dance, and soon The Four Cohans are performing successfully. But George gets cocky as he grows up and is blacklisted by theatrical producers for being troublesome. He leaves the act and hawks his songs unsuccessfully to producers.

In partnership with Sam Harris, another struggling writer, Cohan finally interests a producer and they are on the road to success. He marries Mary, a young singer/dancer. As his star ascends, he persuades his now-struggling parents to join his act, eventually vesting some of his valuable theatrical properties in their name. When the sinking of the Lusitania pulls the U.S. into WWI, Cohan attempts to enlist in the military but at 39 is too old. Determined to play some patriotic role in the war effort, he finds himself inspired to write morale-boosting songs such as “Over There,” which are well-received. Cohan retires but returns to the stage several times, culminating in the role of the U.S. president.

The film returns to the White House, where George has just received the Congressional Gold Medal for his inspirational patriotic songs. As Cohan leaves, he tap-dances down a set of stairs. Outside, Cohan joins a military parade where the soldiers are singing "Over There" as Cohan listens, overcome with emotion. Not knowing Cohan is the song's composer, one of the soldiers asks if he remembers the song. Cohan joins in the singing.

== Cast ==
- James Cagney as George M. Cohan
- Joan Leslie as Mary Cohan
- Walter Huston as Jerry Cohan
- Richard Whorf as Sam Harris
- Irene Manning as Fay Templeton
- George Tobias as Dietz
- Rosemary DeCamp as Nellie Cohan
- Jeanne Cagney as Josie Cohan
- Eddie Foy, Jr. as Eddie Foy Sr.
- Frances Langford as Nora Bayes (credited mistakenly in the end credits as "Singer")
- George Barbier as Abraham Lincoln Erlanger (credited in the end credits as Erlanger)
- S. Z. Sakall as Schwab
- Walter Catlett as Theatre Manager
- Minor Watson as Edward F. Albee II (credited in the end credits as Albee)
- Chester Clute as Harold Goff
- Odette Myrtil as Madame Bartholdi
- Douglas Croft as George M. Cohan (age 13)
- Patsy Lee Parsons as Josie Cohan (age 12)
- Captain Jack Young as President Franklin D. Roosevelt
- Ernie Stanton as Waiter (uncredited)

Cast notes:

- In his role as adviser to the film, George M. Cohan, who admired Fred Astaire's work, let it be known that he preferred Astaire, who also bore a passing resemblance to him, to star in his life story. Cohan presented several studios one of which had Fred Astaire playing Cohan, but Astaire repeatedly turned it down. Astaire turned it down because Cohan's eccentric, stiff-legged dancing was far removed from Astaire's own, more fluid, style.
- James Cagney reprised the role of George M. Cohan in The Seven Little Foys (1955) on the condition that he receive no money; he did the film as a tribute to Eddie Foy. In Yankee Doodle Dandy, Eddie Foy Jr. played his own father. In The Seven Little Foys, Bob Hope portrayed Foy; Charley Foy (brother of Eddie Foy, Jr.) served as a narrator.
- Actress Jeanne Cagney, who played Cohan's sister, was James Cagney's real-life sister. Cagney's brother, William Cagney, was the Associate Producer of the film.
- Rosemary DeCamp, who played George's mother, was 11 years younger than Cagney.
- President Franklin D. Roosevelt was played by Captain Jack Young, a lookalike seen only from the back. An uncredited impressionist, Art Gilmore, provided the voice of Roosevelt. Gilmore would narrate the Joe McDoakes film shorts produced by Warners, and became a well-known announcer on television through the 1970s.
- Uncredited cast members include Eddie Acuff, Murray Alper, Henry Blair (as Cohan at age 7), Ward Bond, Walter Brooke, Georgia Carroll, Glen Cavender, Spencer Charters, Wallis Clark, William B. Davidson, Ann Doran, Tom Dugan, Bill Edwards, Frank Faylen, Pat Flaherty, James Flavin, William Forrest, William Gillespie, Joe Gray, Creighton Hale, John Hamilton, Harry Hayden, Stuart Holmes, William Hopper, Eddie Kane, Fred Kelsey, Vera Lewis, Audrey Long, Hank Mann, Frank Mayo, Lon McCallister, Edward McWade, George Meeker, Dolores Moran, Charles Morton, Jack Mower, Paul Panzer, Francis Pierlot, Clinton Rosemond, Syd Saylor, Frank Sully, Dick Wessel, Leo White, Mickey Daniels and Dave Willock.

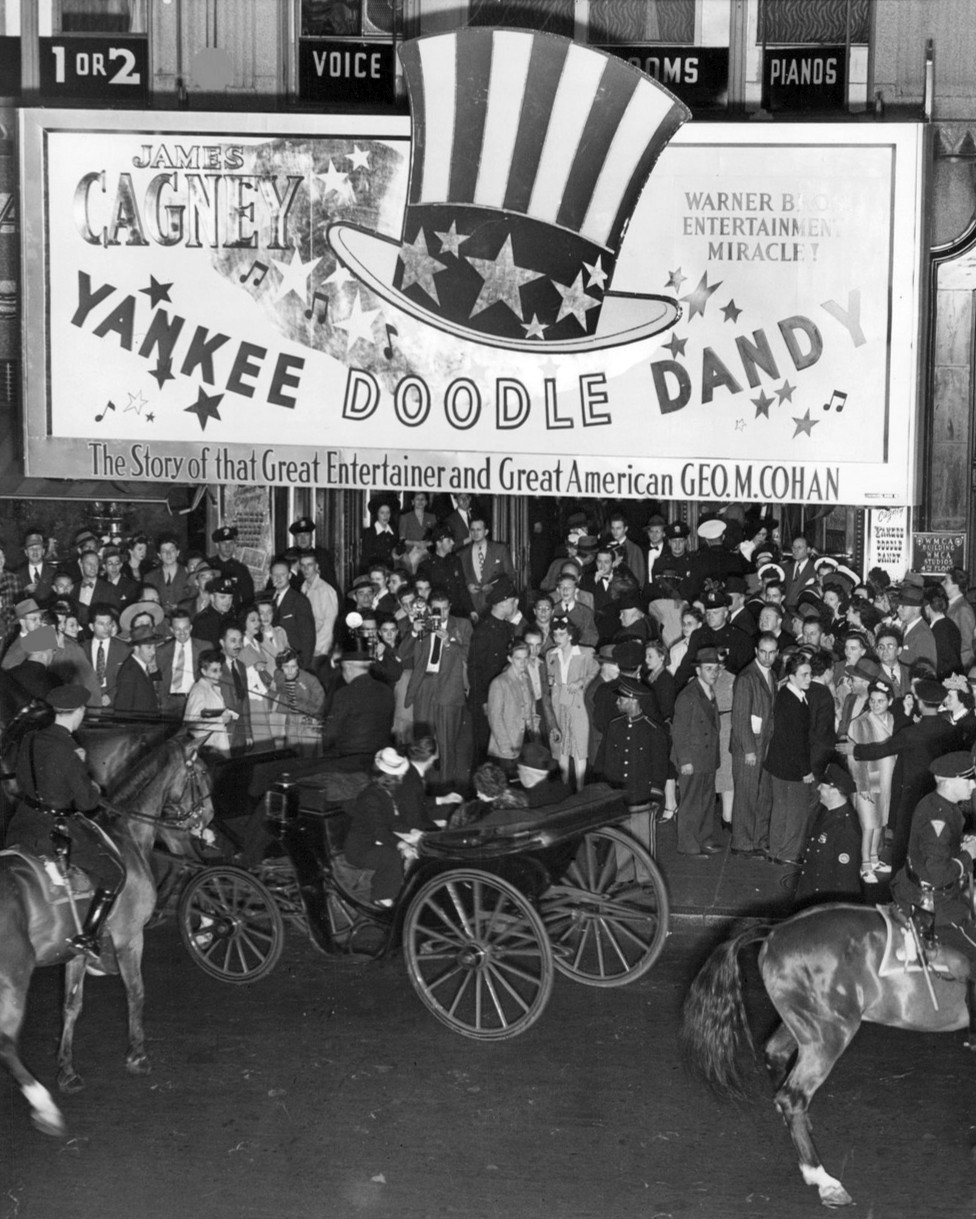
Premiere at New York's Hollywood Theatre on May 29, 1942. Tickets were available only to those who bought war bonds. Former New York governor Al Smith and his wife are in the horse-drawn carriage.

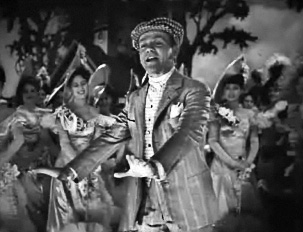
James Cagney as George M. Cohan performing "The Yankee Doodle Boy" from Little Johnny Jones

== Background and production ==
Cagney, like Cohan, was an Irish-American who had been a song-and-dance man early in his career. His unique and seemingly odd presentation style, of half-singing and half-reciting the songs, reflected the style that Cohan himself used. His natural dance style and physique were also a good match for Cohan. Newspapers at the time reported that Cagney intended to consciously imitate Cohan's song-and-dance style, but to play the normal part of the acting in his own style. Although director Curtiz was known as a taskmaster, he also gave his actors some latitude. Cagney and other players came up with a number of "bits of business", as Cagney called them, meaning improvised lines or action in theater parlance.

A number of the biographical particulars of the movie are Hollywood-ized fiction, such as omitting the fact that Cohan divorced and remarried. Cohan's two wives, Ethel and Agnes, were combined into a single character named Mary (in the film, Cohan wrote Mary's A Grand Old Name about her). It also took some liberties with the chronology of Cohan's life and the order of his parents' deaths.

In one scene, after Cohan suffers a flop with an atypical non-musical drama, Popularity, he writes a telegram apologizing to the public. He then leaves the Western Union office to find newspaper sellers announcing the torpedoing of the Lusitania. In reality, the failed play was staged in 1906 and the Lusitania's sinking occurred in 1915.

Nevertheless, care was taken to make the sets, costumes, and dance steps match the original stage presentations. Cagney sprained an ankle twice while mastering Cohan's stiff-legged dance style. This effort was aided significantly by Jack Boyle, a former associate of Cohan's who knew the original productions well. Boyle was also in some of the dancing groups featured in the movie.

Cagney, as Cohan, is shown performing as a singing and dancing version of President Franklin D. Roosevelt. Although it was well known, Roosevelt's use of a wheelchair after a paralytic illness was not emphasized at the time. In the film, Roosevelt never leaves his chair when meeting Cohan.

Cohan himself served as a consultant during the production of the film, as well as being credited with the incidental score. Due to his failing health, his actual involvement in the film was limited. But when completed, the film was privately screened for Cohan and he commented on Cagney's performance: "My God, what an act to follow!"

Because of Cohan's health, Warner Brothers moved the scheduled gala premiere from July 4 to May 29. The original date was chosen because of the film's patriotic theme and because in the movie, Cohan is said to have been born on the Fourth of July (as he wrote in the lyrics of "Yankee Doodle Dandy"). However, Cohan was actually born July 3. Cohan lived for several months after the film's release.

The movie poster for this film was the first ever produced by noted poster designer Bill Gold.

== Musical numbers ==
1. "Overture" – Played by Orchestra behind titles.
2. "Keep Your Eyes Upon Me (The Dancing Master)" – Sung and danced by Walter Huston, then sung and danced by Henry Blair.
3. "While Strolling Through the Park One Day" – Sung and danced by Jo Ann Marlowe.
4. "At a Georgia Camp Meeting" – Danced by James Cagney, Walter Huston, Rosemary DeCamp and Jeanne Cagney.
5. "I Was Born in Virginia" – Sung and danced by James Cagney, Jeanne Cagney, Walter Huston and Rosemary DeCamp.
6. "The Warmest Baby in the Bunch" – Sung and danced by Joan Leslie (dubbed by Sally Sweetland).
7. "Harrigan" – Sung and danced by James Cagney and Joan Leslie.
8. "The Yankee Doodle Boy" – Sung and danced by James Cagney, Joan Leslie (dubbed by Sally Sweetland) and Chorus.
9. "Give My Regards to Broadway" – Sung and danced by James Cagney and Chorus.
10. "Oh You Wonderful Girl / Blue Skies, Gray Skies / The Belle of the Barbers' Ball" – Sung by James Cagney, Jeanne Cagney, Walter Huston and Rosemary DeCamp.
11. "Mary's a Grand Old Name" – Sung by Joan Leslie (dubbed by Sally Sweetland).
12. "Forty-Five Minutes from Broadway" – Sung by James Cagney.
13. "Mary's a Grand Old Name" (reprise 1) – Sung by Joan Leslie (dubbed by Sally Sweetland).
14. "Mary's a Grand Old Name" (reprise 2) – Sung by Irene Manning.
15. "Forty-Five Minutes from Broadway" (reprise) – Sung by Chorus.
16. "So Long, Mary" – Sung by Irene Manning and Chorus.
17. "You're a Grand Old Flag" – Performed by James Cagney and Chorus.
18. "Like the Wandering Minstrel" – Sung by James Cagney and Chorus.
19. "Over There" – Sung by Frances Langford, James Cagney and Chorus.
20. "A George M. Cohan Potpouri" – Sung by Frances Langford.
21. "Off the Record" – Performed by James Cagney.
22. "Over There" (reprise) – Sung by James Cagney and Chorus.
23. "The Yankee Doodle Boy" (reprise) – Played by Orchestra behind end credits.

== Production ==
Cagney had initially been opposed to a biopic of Cohan's life, having disliked Cohan since the Actors' Equity Strike in 1919 in which he sided with the producers. In 1940, Cagney and 15 other Hollywood figures were named in the grand jury testimony of John R. Leech, self-described "chief functionary" of the Los Angeles Communist Party who had been subpoenaed by the House Committee on Un-American Activities. The New York Times printed a front-page allegation that Cagney was a communist. Cagney refuted the accusation and Martin Dies, Jr. made a statement to the press clearing Cagney. William Cagney, one of the film's producers, reportedly told his brother "We're going to have to make the goddamndest patriotic picture that's ever been made. I think it's the Cohan story".

== Reception ==
=== Box office ===
The film nearly doubled the earnings of Captains of the Clouds (1942), Cagney's previous effort, bringing in more than $6 million in rentals to Warner Brothers. According to Warner Brothers figures, it earned $4,631,000 domestically and $1,892,000 foreign. This made it the biggest box-office success in the company's history up to that time. The star earned his contractual $150,000 salary and nearly half a million dollars in profit sharing. According to Variety, the film also earned $4.8 million in theatrical rentals through its North American release.

=== Television ===
Turner Classic Movies traditionally airs this movie during Independence Day along with 1776.

=== Critical response ===
Contemporary reviews were highly positive. Bosley Crowther of The New York Times said film patrons would do well to see it, for "you will find as warm and delightful a musical picture as has hit the screen in years, a corking good entertainment and as affectionate, if not as accurate, a film biography as has ever—yes, ever—been made ... there is so much in this picture and so many persons that deserve their meed of praise that every one connected with it can stick a feather in his hat and take our word—it's dandy!" Variety called the film "as entertaining as any top filmusical ever made ... James Cagney does a Cohan of which the original George M. might well be proud." Harrison's Reports wrote: "Excellent! Audiences should find this musical comedy, which is based on the life of George M. Cohan, one of the most sparkling and delightful musical pictures that have ever been brought to the screen. Much of its entertainment value is due to the exceptionally fine performance of James Cagney, whose impersonation of Mr. Cohan is uncanny—his gestures, his talk, and his dancing, are done to perfection." John Mosher of The New Yorker called the film "a complete delight, an extravaganza of tunes the country has liked for decades," although he considered it "dubious" as a biography of Cohan. Review aggregator website Rotten Tomatoes reports that 91% of 32 critics' reviews are positive, with an average rating of 7.9/10. The site's critics consensus reads: "James Cagney deploys his musical gifts to galvanizing effect in Yankee Doodle Dandy, a celebration of patriotic fervor as much as it is a biopic of George M. Cohan." On Metacritic, it has a weighted average score of 89 out of 100, based on 10 critics, indicating "universal acclaim".

=== Awards and honors ===
The film won Academy Awards for Best Actor in a Leading Role (James Cagney), Best Music, Scoring of a Musical Picture (Ray Heindorf and Heinz Roemheld), and Best Sound Recording (Nathan Levinson). It was nominated for Best Actor in a Supporting Role (Walter Huston), Best Director, Best Film Editing for George Amy, Best Picture and Best Writing, Original Story. In 1993, Yankee Doodle Dandy was selected for preservation in the United States National Film Registry by the Library of Congress as being "culturally, historically, or aesthetically significant".

American Film Institute recognition

- 1998: AFI's 100 Years...100 Movies – #100
- 2004: AFI's 100 Years...100 Songs – #71
  - The Yankee Doodle Boy
- 2005: AFI's 100 Years...100 Movie Quotes:
  - "My mother thanks you. My father thanks you. My sister thanks you. And I thank you." – #97
- 2006: AFI's 100 Years of Musicals – #18
- 2006: AFI's 100 Years...100 Cheers – #88
- 2007: AFI's 100 Years...100 Movies (10th Anniversary Edition) – #98

== Adaptations ==
- Yankee Doodle Dandy was adapted as a radio play on the October 19, 1942 broadcast of The Screen Guild Theater, starring James Cagney with Rita Hayworth and Betty Grable.
- George M! is a stage musical, also based on the life of George M. Cohan, opened on Broadway in 1968.

== See also ==
- Yankee Doodle Daffy, a 1943 animated short film starting Daffy Duck and Porky Pig.
