= The Yankee Doodle Boy =

Song composed by George M. Cohan

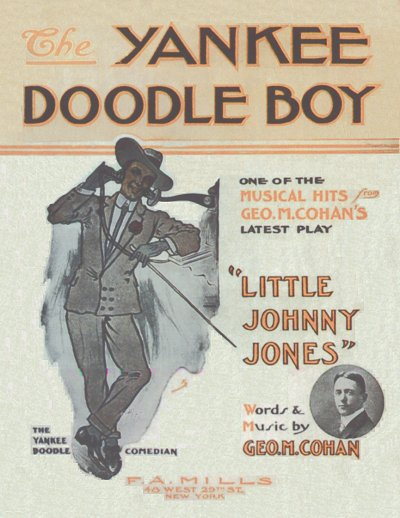
- Sheet music cover, 1904

Song
- Published: 1904 by F. A. Mills
- Genre: show tune
- Songwriter: George M. Cohan

"The Yankee Doodle Boy", also known as "(I'm a) Yankee Doodle Dandy" is a patriotic song from the Broadway musical Little Johnny Jones, written by George M. Cohan. The play opened at the Liberty Theater on November 7, 1904. The play concerns the trials and tribulations of a fictional American jockey, Johnny Jones (based on the real-life jockey Tod Sloan), who rides a horse named Yankee Doodle in the English Derby. Cohan incorporates snippets of several popular traditional American songs into his lyrics of this song, as he often did with his songs. The song was performed by James Cagney in the 1942 film Yankee Doodle Dandy, in which he played Cohan.

== Modern performances and covers ==
In 2004, the American Film Institute placed the song at No. 71 on its AFI's 100 Years...100 Songs. A version of the song was recorded by Cohan's contemporary and fellow Irish-American Billy Murray, who sang it as indicated in the lyrics. Also, a shortened lyric disco version of the song was sung by Paul Jabara on the 1977 album Shut Out and the 1983 album Greatest Hits and Misses on Casablanca Records. The song appears in an episode of It's Always Sunny in Philadelphia.

The Hawthorn Football Club re-wrote the lyrics of "The Yankee Doodle Boy" as their club Anthem, "We're a Happy Team at Hawthorn" This is sung at the start of every Hawthorn AFL & AFLW game as the players make their way onto the ground and also after a win. Also, NRL club Canterbury-Bankstown Bulldogs using the former club anthem "Canterbury is the Greatest".

== Lyrics ==
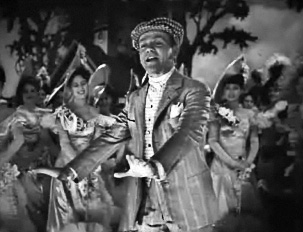
James Cagney as George M. Cohan performing "The Yankee Doodle Boy" in Yankee Doodle Dandy (1942)

Verse 1

I'm the kid that's all the candy, ^{1}
I'm a Yankee Doodle Dandy,
I'm glad I am,
So's Uncle Sam.
I'm a real live Yankee Doodle,
Made my name and fame and boodle,
Just like Mister Doodle did, by riding on a pony.
I love to listen to the Dixie strain,
I long to see the girl I left behind me;
That ain't a josh,
She's a Yankee, by gosh.
Oh, say can you see,
Anything about a Yankee that's a phony?

Verse 2

Father's name was Hezikiah,
Mother's name was Ann Maria, ^{2}
Yanks through and through.
Red, White and Blue
Father was so Yankee-hearted,
When the Spanish war was started,
He slipped on a uniform and hopped upon a pony.
My mother's mother was a Yankee true,
My father's father was a Yankee too:
That's going some,
For the Yankees, by gum.
Oh, say can you see
Anything about my pedigree that's phony?

Chorus

I'm a Yankee Doodle Dandy,
A Yankee Doodle, do or die;
A real live nephew of my Uncle Sam,
Born on the Fourth of July.
I've got a Yankee Doodle sweetheart,
She's my Yankee Doodle joy.
Yankee Doodle came to London, just to ride the ponies;
I am the Yankee Doodle Boy.

Footnotes:

^{1} "All the candy" was late 19th century slang equivalent to "hot stuff".

^{2} Pronounced "mah-RYE-ah"
