= The Broadway League =

American live theatre association since 1930

The Broadway League, Inc.
- Logo of the Broadway League
- Founded: 1930; 96 years ago
- Type: Trade Association 501(c)(6)
- Tax ID no.: 13-0951470
- Location(s): 1501 Broadway; 22nd Floor; New York City 10036; United States
- Region served: Theatre
- Members: 700+
- Key people: Jason Laks; President
- Revenue: $9,360,554 (FY2013)
- Expenses: $7,587,315 (FY2013)
- Employees: 59
- Volunteers: 90
- Website: www.broadwayleague.com
- Formerly called: The League of American Theatres and Producers (1985–2007); The League of New York Theatres and Producers (1973–1985); The League of New York Theatres (1930–1973)

The Broadway League, formerly the League of American Theatres and Producers and League of New York Theatres and Producers, is the national trade association for the Broadway theatre industry based in New York City. Its members include theatre owners and operators, producers, presenters, and general managers in New York and more than 250 other North American cities, as well as suppliers of goods and services to the theatre industry.

Founded in 1930 primarily to counter ticket speculation and scalping, The Broadway League has expanded its mission and programs over time. In addition to negotiating labor agreements with 14 unions in New York City and engaging in lobbying initiatives throughout the country, The League recognizes excellent works and artists through award programs such as the Tony Awards, promotes the Broadway theatre industry through audience development programs such as Kids' Night on Broadway and Viva Broadway, and provides periodic studies and industry information such as box office grosses and demographic surveys for journalists, scholars, and the general public. According to The Broadway League, shows on Broadway sold approximately US$1.54 billion worth of tickets in both the 2022–23 and the 2023–24 seasons. Both seasons featured theater attendance of approximately 12.3 million each.

== Membership ==
The Broadway League has more than 700 members representing the Broadway theatre industry in New York and more than 200 other North American cities across the United States.

In addition to theatre owners, producers, presenters, general managers who create productions and operate theatres across the country, industry specialists and vendors such as press agents, booking agents, advertising agencies, and scenery, costume, and prop shops are all eligible for membership.

== History ==
The League was founded in 1930 as the "League of New York Theatres and Producers". It was founded by Broadway theatre operators to further common interests, with the main purpose of fighting ticket speculation and scalping. The original purpose of the League described in its charter was to "protect the general public patrons of the theater, owners of theatrical entertainments, operators of theaters and reputable theater ticket brokers against the evils of speculation of theater tickets." The League's first successful act was the writing of the Theater Ticket Code of Fair Practice (together with Actors' Equity) which became a state law in 1940. These efforts are still relevant today, as ticket resellers in New York State are required to obtain a license from the Department of State and are prohibited from reselling tickets within 500 feet of theatres or box offices.

In the following years the League expanded its charter several times. In 1938, the League became the official collective bargaining unit representing the theatre owners and producers on Broadway to negotiate labor agreements with unions such as Actors' Equity.

With the decline of Broadway in the 1980s the League changed its name to the "League of American Theatres and Producers" and began to expand its domain to theatres across the United States. On December 18, 2007 the League adopted its current name, "The Broadway League". In a press statement announcing the name change, the League explained that its membership is "not limited to theatre owners and producers, but includes Broadway presenters, general managers and other Broadway industry professionals," and the new name "more aptly reflects the composition of the League's membership."

== Labor negotiations ==
The Broadway League is a collective bargaining unit representing Broadway producers and theatre owners, and negotiates labor agreements with 14 unions in New York City to set the minimum terms (fees, salaries, work rules, etc.) for hiring union members. Broadway productions are fully unionized, and all employees are members of unions such as Actors' Equity Association (AEA), Stage Directors and Choreographers Society (SDC), Local 802 of American Federation of Musicians (AFM), and Local One of International Alliance of Theatrical Stage Employees (IATSE). The Broadway League also works with the Dramatists Guild of America, an organization composed of playwrights, composers, and lyricists, to engage authors for Broadway productions. Even though the Guild is not a union because authors are not employees of producers or theatres, the Guild provides the Approved Production Contract, a contract template for authors to use in negotiations with producers.

Out of 40 existing Broadway theatres, the collectively bargained agreements the League negotiates with unions only apply to the theatres owned by the Shubert Organization, Jujamcyn Theaters, and the Nederlander Organization. Theatres owned and operated by not-for-profit organizations such as the Roundabout Theatre Company, Lincoln Center Theater, and Manhattan Theatre Club are under the jurisdiction of the League of Resident Theatres which negotiates separate agreements with unions. Disney Theatrical Group, which owns the New Amsterdam Theatre, also negotiates labor agreements independently, as well as a handful of others.

=== Broadway musicians strike in 2003 ===
The Local 802 of AFM, the union representing the musicians on Broadway, entered into a strike in March 2003 and was joined by other Broadway unions such as AEA and IATSE. The strike lasted from Friday, March 7, 2003, to early Tuesday morning, March 11, 2003.

The focus of the negotiation was the minimum number of musicians required to be employed in Broadway theatres. The labor agreement required 24 to 25 musicians to be employed in largest theatres, regardless of the needs of the actual productions presented. Under the new agreement, the minimums were reduced to 18 to 19.

=== Broadway stagehand strike in 2007 ===
The most recent strike on Broadway occurred in November 2007, when the Broadway League and the stagehands union, Local One of IATSE, failed to come to agreement after months of negotiation. Local One was joined by other Broadway unions such as AEA and SDC, and 27 shows running on Broadway were shut down. This marked the first strike on Broadway in Local One's 120-year history, and the strike lasted for 19 days, recording the longest strike on Broadway since 1975.

The economic impact of the strike spread beyond the Broadway shows, to nearby restaurants, hotels, gift shops, and bars. Tim Tompkins, the head of the Times Square Business Improvement District, explained that "a lot of folks come to New York specifically to go to a Broadway show and with this cloud of uncertainty, they postpone or cancel their trips. So that's a double hit." According to the New York City comptroller's office, the strike resulted in $2 million in lost revenue per day in addition to the lost ticket sales, mounting to $40 million total.

The main conflict in the negotiation was the work rules regarding load-ins. The existing contract required producers to determine a number of stagehands needed for the load-in ahead of time, and hire and pay all of them every day for the entire load-in period, which could take weeks to months for large-scale productions. However, because the workload differs everyday, many stagehands often just stayed in the theatres with nothing to do. The new contract set the daily minimum during the load-in to 17 stagehands, allowing the producers to hire stagehands based on daily workload.

== Government relations ==
The Broadway League has advocated for the needs of commercial theatre industry with local, state and national elected officials throughout its history, beginning with writing of the Theater Ticket Code of Fair Practice which became a state law in 1940. Recent lobbying efforts by the League include opposing an 8 percent levy on theatre tickets proposed by Governor David Paterson in 2009, and securing tax deductions for suppliers of physical goods used by theatrical productions.

=== Wireless microphone spectrum ===
The Broadway League, in conjunction with the National Football League and large churches, is protesting against the U.S. Federal Communications Commission's plans to auction the frequencies used by wireless microphones used in theatres and venues throughout the U.S.

=== The Support Theaters in America Growth and Expansion Act ===
As a result of lobbying initiatives by the Broadway League, in February 2015, Sen. Charles Schumer (D-N.Y.) and Sen. Roy Blunt (R-Mo.) reintroduced legislation named The Support Theaters in America Growth and Expansion Act that would provide Broadway and live theatrical productions federal tax benefits already given to film and TV productions. Under Section 181 of the tax code, U.S.-based film and TV productions are able to immediately expense up to $15 million and do not pay taxes on income until the $15 million is recouped. The League hopes that the benefits of Section 181 would make attracting investors easier, because the investors are currently paying income taxes before recoupment, without making any profit from projects.

== Award programs ==
=== The Tony Awards ===
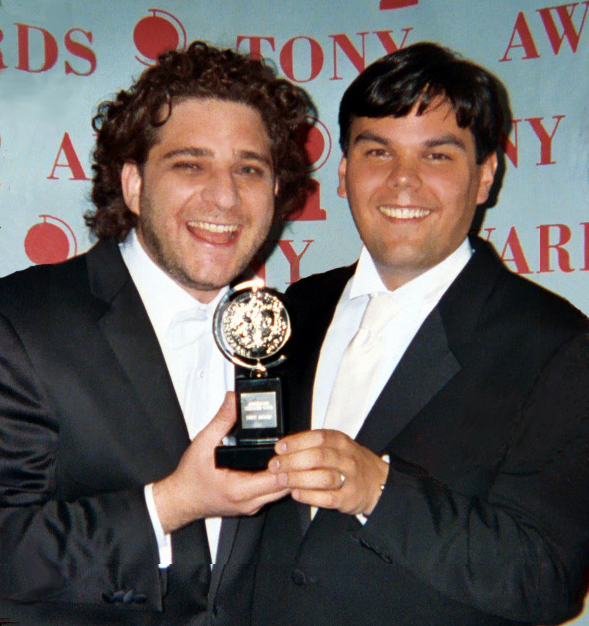
Jeff Marx and Robert Lopez with their Tony Award for Best Original Score in 2004

The Antoinette Perry Awards for Excellence in Theatre, more commonly known as the Tony Awards, recognize achievement in live Broadway theatre. The Tony Awards are presented by the Tony Award Productions, a joint venture of American Theatre Wing and the League, at an annual ceremony in New York City. The awards are mostly for Broadway productions and performances, though an award for regional theatres and discretionary non-competitive Special Tony Award and the Tony Honors for Excellence in Theatre are also given. The awards were founded by the Wing in 1947, and the League became a co-presenter in 1967.

Prior to 2000, membership in what was then the League of American Theaters and Producers was lifetime for all dues-paying above-the-title producers of Broadway shows. Members received two free tickets to all Broadway shows, and ballots for the Tony Awards, vouching that they had seen all shows in every category in which they voted. In 2000, the League changed membership eligibility to "active" producers, those who had been above-the-title in the previous 10 years. This action dis-enfranchised scores of Tony voters, including Gail Berman, Harve Brosten, Dick Button, Tony Lo Bianco, and Raymond Serra.

=== The Touring Broadway Awards ===
The Touring Broadway Awards (TBAs) recognized outstanding achievement in touring productions of Broadway plays and musicals in North America from 2000 to 2009. Founded in 2000–2001 season by the League, the awards were known until 2004 as the National Broadway Theatre Awards. The awards were presented by the League to "celebrate excellence in touring Broadway by honoring the artists and productions that visit cities across the country each year."

== Concert programs ==
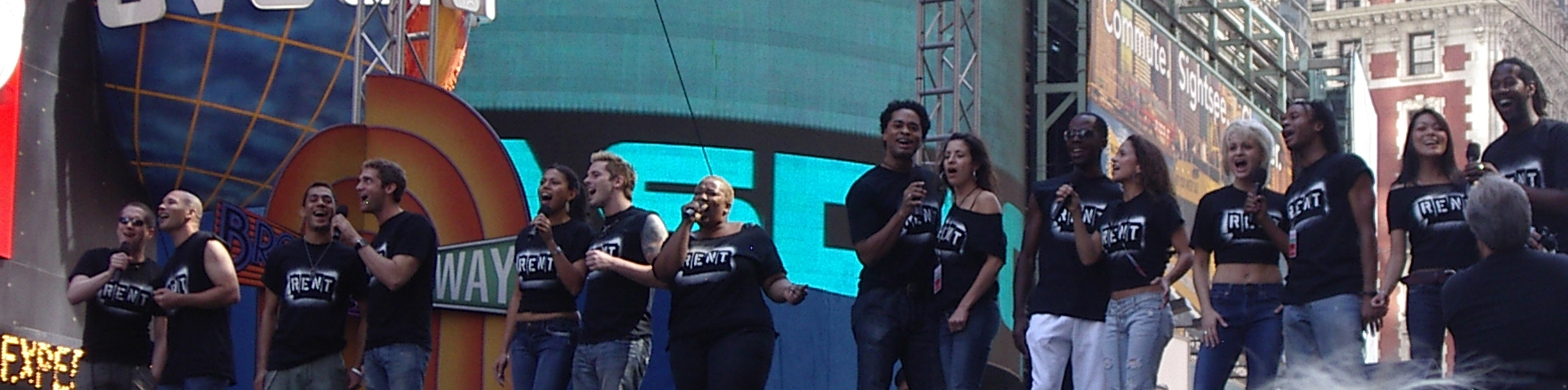
Cast of Rent performing "Seasons of Love" at Broadway on Broadway, 2005

The Broadway League produces various concert programs such as Broadway on Broadway and Stars in the Alley to promote productions currently running on Broadway.

Broadway on Broadway was a free annual outdoor concert kicking off the Broadway season each September, usually on the first Sunday after Labor Day, produced by the League and the Times Square Alliance. Initially conceived as a welcome party for delegates to the 1992 Democratic National Convention in New York, the event took place on a special stage created for the event in Times Square, featuring musical numbers from current Broadway shows as well as upcoming shows opening in the new season. The concert returned in July 1993 and 1994 and moved to September on 1995. The League canceled Broadway on Broadway in 2013 and it did not return in 2014.

Stars in the Alley is a free annual outdoor concert in Shubert Alley in the heart of Manhattan's Theatre District, produced by the League. It is usually held during the week of the Tony Awards, and marks the official end of the Broadway season. The 21st annual event was held on June 6, 2007, and the casts of dozens of Broadway shows took part. Though the event was not held from 2008 to 2013, it returned in 2014 featuring Norm Lewis as the host.

Tony Awards Preview Concert was a cabaret-style concert featuring songs from Tony-nominated shows held in 2008, 2009 and 2013. The 2013 concert, hosted by Mario Lopez, was aired at various times and dates in 18 cities across the United States and included interviews from the then Tony nominees such as Lin-Manuel Miranda, Andrea Martin, Mark Rylance, and Rob Ashford.

Other concert programs include Broadway Under the Stars, an annual evening concert held from 2002 to 2006, and a benefit concert for Viva Broadway, an audience development initiative specifically targeted to Hispanic communities.

== Audience development programs ==
The Broadway League leads audience development programs targeting specific communities to broaden the audience base for Broadway productions. For example, Kids' Night on Broadway was created by the League and the Theater Development Fund to provide families across the U.S. affordable access to Broadway productions. On Kids' Night On Broadway, children from ages 6 to 18 receive free tickets to participating Broadway shows when accompanied by a paying adult. Similarly, Family First Nights introduce economically at-risk families to Broadway productions in New York as well as around the country through subsidized tickets.

In 2012, the League launched a new audience development program named Viva Broadway, which focuses on Hispanic communities around the country. Working with Hispanic media outlets, Viva Broadway aims to promote Broadway to Hispanic families, proposing theatergoing experiences that fit their lifestyles and cultural traditions to engage in family activities involving multiple generations. Broadway Speakers Bureau, a program that encourages high school and college students to pursue non-performance careers in theatre, was also created as a part of Viva Broadway.

== Services ==
=== Internet Broadway Database ===
Operated by the research department of the League, The Internet Broadway Database (IBDB) is an online database of Broadway theatre productions and their personnel, including lengths of runs, lists of casts and creators, awards and nominations, and past box office grosses. It is "a definitive source for the facts on Broadway musicals and plays from Aristophanes to Ziegfeld," according to the New York Public Library. In 2012, the League introduced a free iOS app for IBDB that contain much of the same information as the website, as well as photos and videos from current Broadway productions.

=== Research ===
The League serves as the central hub for statistical information about Broadway theatre production in North America. Its research department maintains historical data on individual playhouses and productions. In addition, many reference documents, including weekly box office grosses and season-by-season statistics, are available to the public, journalists, and scholars via the website. Theatre publications such as The New York Times, Playbill, and Variety publish databases and articles using data provided by the League.

The research department also publishes annual reports that track trends in the industry over time including the Demographics of the Broadway Audience and Broadway's Economic Contribution. To obtain demographic information, the League hands out questionnaires at select performances to directly survey audience members. The survey tracks basic demographic information such as their gender, age, place of residence, and ethnicity, as well as theatergoing behaviors such as the number of plays and musicals they have attended in the past six months. For example, The New York Times reported that "tourists accounted for nearly two-thirds of the tickets sold for Broadway shows" and "those who saw 15 shows or more made up only 5 percent of the overall audience, but accounted for 29 percent of admissions" in 2010–11 season based on the studies published by the League.

=== Other notable services ===
- Broadway Green Alliance (BGA) (formerly Broadway Goes Green): an initiative that promotes environmentally friendlier practices in theatre production, launched in 2008.
- Broadway Fan Club: A monthly newsletter
- Broadway Speakers Bureau: encouraging high school and college students to explore non-performance careers in theatre
- Apple Awards: a program rewarding efforts to support education programs relating to Broadway or touring Broadway shows that was started in 2003

== Past organizational leadership ==
Organizational leadership since the League's founding in 1930:

Presidents / Chairs

- Arthur Hopkins, President, 1930–1931
- Max Gordon, President, 1932–1933
- Marcus Heiman, President, 1934–1946
- Brock Pemberton, President, 1947–1949
- Arthur Schwartz, President, 1950–1953
- Leland Hayward, President, 1954
- Herman Levin (1), President, 1955–1957
- Louis Lotito, President, 1958–1960
- Robert Whitehead, President, 1960–1962
- Herman Levin (2), President, 1963
- Harold Prince, President, 1964–1966
- Richard Barr, Chairman, 1967–1988
- Cy Feuer, Chairman, 1989–2003
- Gerald Schoenfeld, Chairman 2003–2007
- Nina Lannan, Chair, 2007–2009
- Paul Libin, Chairman, 2009–2011
- Nick Scandalios, Chairman, 2011–2014
- Robert Wankel, Chairman, 2015–present

Executive directors / Presidents

- Henry Moskowitz, 1930–1937
- James F. Reilly, 1938–1960
- Irving Cheskin, 1961–1982
- Harvey Sabinson, 1982–1995
- Jed Bernstein (President), 1995–2006
- Charlotte St. Martin (President), 2006–2024
- Jason Laks (President), 2024–present

== See also ==
- Society of London Theatre
- League of Resident Theatres
- TKTS
