= Kids' Night on Broadway =

Promotional theater program for free admission for children

Logo for Kids' Night on Broadway.

On Kids' Night on Broadway, kids age 6-18 get to see a participating Broadway show for free when accompanied by a full-paying adult as well as dining deals and more. Kids' Night on Broadway takes place each winter in New York City, as well as all year round in cities across the U.S.

== History ==
Kids' Night on Broadway (KNOB) is a program of The Broadway League, the national trade association for the Broadway theatre industry. Designed to introduce young people to the magic of live theatre and make Broadway accessible to a new generation of theatergoers, Kids' Night on Broadway has welcomed young people to Broadway shows in New York and on tour across the U.S. since the program was created in 1996 by The Broadway League and the Theatre Development Fund.

As the League's signature national audience development program, Kids' Night on Broadway offers children age's 6-18 free admission to participating shows when accompanied by a full-paying adult. In addition, KNOB offers family-friendly restaurant and parking discounts. Since its inception in 1996 to KNOB 2012, over 175,000 kids have participated with over 250,000 tickets sold. Kids' Night on Broadway takes place in other cities across the county, all year long.

== Event Details ==
- Free tickets to young people age 6-18 who attend a Broadway show with a paying adult.
- Area restaurant and parking discounts in New York City.
- Kids go free at pre-theatre educational event, parties, and activities such as Broadway dance lessons, theatrical make-up stations, Autograph Alley with Broadway performers, and participation in the Broadway Green Alliance's bottle cap collection drive.
- Kids' Night on Broadway Activity Guide, provided by The New York Times.

== Sponsors ==
The New York Times is the presenting sponsor of Kids' Night on Broadway, a program of The Broadway League. In 2012, Madame Tussauds New York was also an official sponsor. Official media partners were WABC-TV, Z100, and 103.5 KTU.

As 2012's cause-related component, Kids' Night on Broadway saluted Givenik, the only place on the web to get Broadway tickets and have 5% donated to the charity of your choice.

== Past Events ==
Since its inception in 1996, Kids' Night on Broadway has attracted thousands of kids to the program that not only offers discount tickets to Broadway shows, but also allows young theatergoers the opportunity to experience some of the behind the scenes magic of the theatre.

In 2000, Kids' Night on Broadway expanded from not only one night, but to two nights of live theatre experience for kids, ages 6 to 18, across the country. KNOB also served as an anchor event for "Rising Stars Live Broadway Talent Contest," a talent contest where entrants won tickets to Broadway shows, signed posters, CDs, and more as well as be judged by professional agents, and the "Kids' Fan Fair," which offered backstage activities including dance lessons, face painting, makeup design, and trying on Broadway costumes before the KNOB theatre performances.

2007's KNOB events were sponsored by Autism Speaks. Fear-mongering about autism and Autism Speaks were printed on Kids' Night materials, on its websites, and at fanfest events at Madame Tussauds. Julie Andrews and daughter Emma Walton Hamilton acted as Kid's Night on Broadway National Ambassadors for the event held at Madame Tussauds.

Rosie O'Donnell served as 2008's Kids' Night on Broadway National Ambassador. The event, sponsored by Madame Tussauds New York and The New York Times, included an educational component and pre-theatre events in addition to the discounted tickets. A party held at Madame Tussauds kicked off the event. Ms. O'Donnell served as the National Ambassador in 2009, as well.

In 2010, Adam Riegler, who played Pugsley in The Addams Family musical, acted as KNOB National Ambassador for a special Kids' Night on Broadway Halloween Edition. This special edition of Kids' Night saluted UNICEF and the 60th anniversary of its Trick-or-Treat for UNICEF program.

In New York City, KNOB took place on February 5–9, 2012. Participants experienced the behind-the-scenes magic of Broadway at a pre-theatre party at Madame Tussauds. Plus, Kids' got to eat for less thanks to special family discounts at Times Square area restaurants.

The 2012 National Ambassador was Nick Jonas, then appearing as J. Pierrepont Finch in How to Succeed in Business Without Really Trying. Presented by The New York Times. A free fan festival drew an estimated 3,000 kids and their parents to Madame Tussauds in New York.

Other past ambassadors include Kelly Ripa, Sarah Jessica Parker, and John Lithgow. Kids' Night in Broadway has been hosted at a number of venues including Macy's, Toys "R" Us, Madame Tussauds, Bowlmor Lanes, and Roseland Ballroom.
