= Hugh Southern =

Performing arts manager (1932–2019)

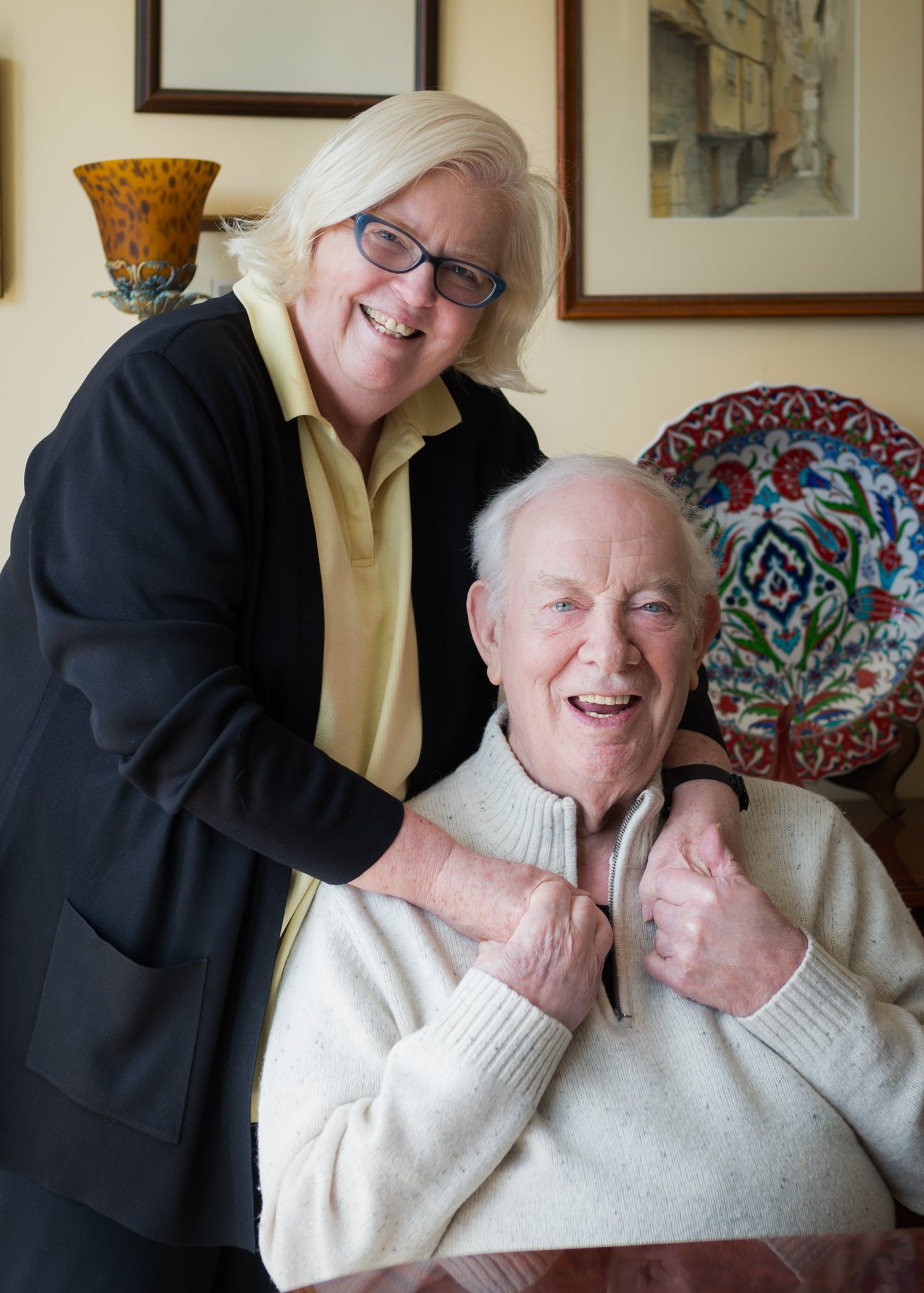
- Southern and his wife Kathy Dwyer Southern
- Born: March 20, 1932; Newcastle-on-Tyne, England
- Died: July 15, 2019 (aged 87); Leesburg, Virginia
- Occupation: performing arts manager
- Spouse: Kathy Dywer Southern

Hugh Southern was a performing arts manager, known for his work as the executive director of Theater Development Fund, acting chairman and deputy chairman of programs for the National Endowment for the Arts, Washington, D.C., and as the general manager of the Metropolitan Opera in New York City.

== Biography ==
Hugh Southern was born March 20, 1932, to Norman and Phyllis Margaret (Hiller) in Newcastle-on-Tyne, England. He received his Bachelor of Arts degree in English language and Literature in 1956 from King's College, Cambridge, England. After moving to New York from London in 1955, he became active in the theater community, working as treasurer for the Westport Country Playhouse in Connecticut. From 1959–1962 he was administrative manager of the Theatre Guild-American Theatre Society. From 1962–1965, he served as assistant director of the Repertory Theatre, Lincoln Center, and from 1965 to 1967 as its general manager. During this period, Southern also advised the producers of Expo 67 in Montreal. On the national front, Southern became managing associate for the San Francisco Opera leading its Western Opera Theater touring company. He was acting director of the New York State Council on the Arts and a director of both the New Dramatists, and the Film Forum. From 1978 to 1985 he was a trustee for the American Actor's Fund. Memberships include trustee for Manhattan Country School, New York City, where he was its chairman, 1971–1974.

From 1968 to 1982, Southern was the executive director of Theatre Development Fund, the nonprofit organization for the performing arts that works to make theatre affordable and accessible. During that time, Southern was responsible for creating the first TKTS booth to sell discount tickets for Broadway productions. The inaugural booth, a trailer donated by New York City's Parks Department, opened in June 1973 in Duffy Square. During Southern's tenure, Theatre Development Fund grew to be one of the largest service organizations for the performing arts in the country. Theater Development Fund now operates four TKTS booths in NYC.

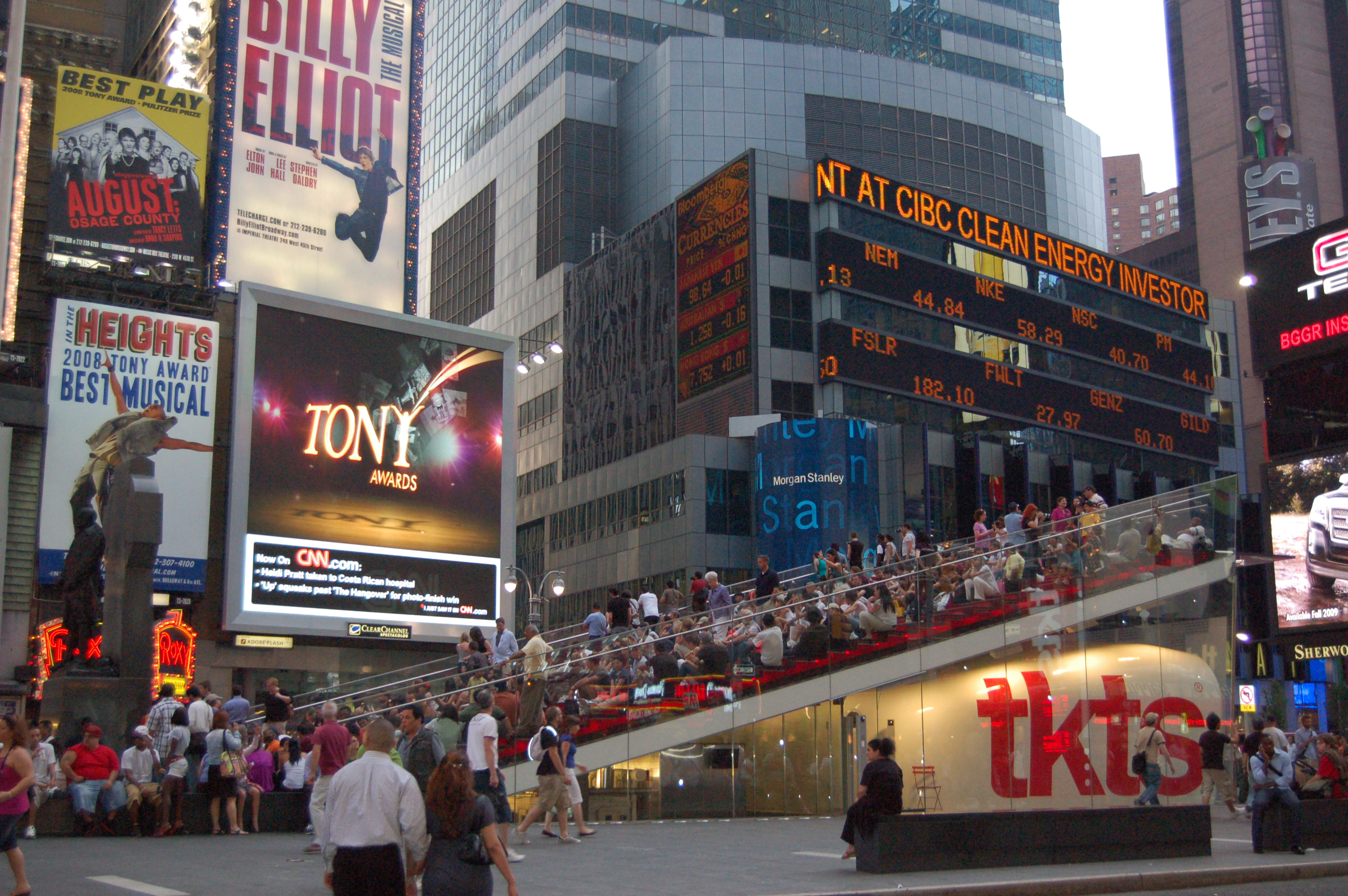
TKTS Booth @ Times Square (3619286756)

Following his time with the Theatre Development Fund, Southern worked for the National Endowment for the Arts, the independent federal agency that funds, promotes, and strengthens the creative capacity communities across the country. He spent several years as deputy chairman before being named acting chairman in 1989. That year, one of the photos in an exhibition of the work of Andres Serrano, which was supported by a $15,000 NEA grant, drew the ire of the religious right.

Southern's leadership during the controversy helped him land a position as general manager of The Metropolitan Opera in 1989 after a ten-month search by the Met. Southern's tenure was brief, and he resigned from the Met after nine months, stating that he had not found fulfillment in the position. Following this, Southern became a director for the Virginia Festival of American Film in Charlottesville, Virginia, until he retired.

== Personal life ==
In 1954, Southern married Jane Rosemary Llewellyn, with whom he had two children, Hilary and William, with the marriage ending in divorce. In 1988, he married Kathy Ayers Dwyer and they had one child, Jaime, and he remained married until his death. Southern died on July 15 in a hospital in Leesburg, Virginia. He was 87. His wife, Kathy Dwyer Southern, said the cause was pneumonia and congestive heart failure.
