= Manhattan Country School =

Coordinates: 40.78780°N 73.95486°W

Location
- 150 West 85th Street; New York, New York 10024; United States

Information
- School type: Coed, Private
- Established: 1966
- Closed: 2025
- Head of school: Maiya Jackson & Carmine Branagan
- Faculty: Approximately 70 members, both full-time and part-time
- Grades: PreK–8
- Enrollment: 293
- Colors: Navy, White
- Athletics: Soccer, basketball, track, softball, tennis
- Athletics conference: American International Private School League
- Affiliations: NYSAIS, ISAAGNY
- Website: manhattancountryschool.org

Manhattan Country School was an independent coeducational PreK–8 school with its main location in Manhattan and a farm in Roxbury, New York. Founded in 1966, it is distinctive because of its multicultural and progressive educational philosophy, the diversity of its student body, its sliding scale tuition system, its incorporation of farm experiences and the activism of its students.

== History ==
Manhattan Country School's origins are rooted in the social, ideological, and educational principles of the 1960s. Founders Gus and Marty Trowbridge were encouraged by judicial decisions in favor of equal opportunity and inspired by the leadership of Dr. Martin Luther King Jr.

In October 2024, the school was facing foreclosure after failing to pay $3 million worth of debt to Flushing Bank, a lending corporation.

On May 16, 2025, Manhattan Country School filed for Chapter 11 bankruptcy protection, listing assets and liabilities between $10 million and $50 million. The school stated it had suffered major losses, particularly due to effects caused by the COVID-19 pandemic. On May 20, 2025, a U.S. bankruptcy judge rejected an emergency financing plan that would help keep the school operational during the bankruptcy process. The school then warned that it was at risk of closing its doors permanently, stating it could occur as soon as the following week. On June 18, 2025, the school converted its Chapter 11 case to a Chapter 7 bankruptcy liquidation.

== Curriculum ==
The curriculum at MCS was very rigorous, demanding, and sufficiently challenging for students. Until the 6–7s (1st grade), students are not given any homework. Once students reach the 6–7s, homework is given to them weekly on Wednesday. The amount of homework starts to slowly increase while students are in the Lower School. In the 8–9s and 9–10s (3rd and 4th grades), students are assigned to read a certain number of books every year, and record their weekly reading process in a reading log.

From Pre–K until the 8th grade, there is a theme or central focus in the year's curriculum. For example, the 8–9s, the focus is on Native Americans, and eventually branches out to European Explorers. Students must put on plays inspired by the explorer that they have been assigned to study. In the 9–10s, the primary focus is Migration to the Americas, and students take class trips to Washington Heights and even Ellis Island. The themes and focuses in the classroom become more complex as students enter the Upper School. In the 5th grade, students study Sumerian life, environmental issues, and also Egypt. Toward the end of the year, an Egyptian market (which 5th graders put together), is held in the school Library. All classes can come and visit. In the sixth grade, students learn about the Civil Rights Movement, by delving into autobiographies, watching documentaries, and even putting together a play, which is presented at the annual Martin Luther King Jr. assembly. In the 7th and 8th grade, History, Science and English are taught with a mixed group of 7th and 8th graders in the classroom. An alternating two-year program is put together for these three subjects. For example, an entering 8th grader would be learning about the topics that the last year's graduates learned about when they were in 7th grade).

== Farm program ==
The Manhattan Country School Farm is a small working farm in the northern Catskill Mountains, located 150 miles from New York City in Roxbury, New York.

Students tend the gardens, care for the animals (chickens, cows, pigs and sheep), learn to weave, explore fields, mountains and streams, and study traditional and contemporary life in the Catskills. Farm trips emphasize human dependence on natural processes and community members' reliance on each other. Working together to make the farm relatively self-sufficient, students learn to use farm products for food, fuel, and clothing. At the same time they examine the economies of nature, in the wild and on the farm, and determine the best measures for environmental conservation. Sharing these activities, attending daily classes, and performing household and barn chores, the students come to function as a mutually reliant community.

The daily schedule begins at 7:00 a.m. Morning and evening barn chores include egg collecting, feeding animals and cleaning their pens. Household chores involve setting tables and cleaning up after meals, and cleaning the entire house. These jobs are rotated and every child has two or three tasks to do each day.

Morning and afternoon classes include meal planning and cooking, churning butter, baking bread, and preserving garden produce; seasonal farm work such as planting and harvesting, assisting with sheep shearing, and collecting sap to boil into maple syrup; outdoor maintenance work such as fence repair, caring for nature trails, splitting fire wood, and keeping the wood bins stocked; textiles processes such as carding, spinning, dyeing and weaving the wool from our sheep; nature field trips in the woods and fields and along the streams on the farm; hikes to scenic promontories in the Catskills and visits to other farms or places of historical interest.

A daily quiet hour is used for independent study, reading or journal writing. After-dinner activities might be an evening nature walk, a dramatic game or performance, story-reading, or an outdoor group game. Bedtime is 8:30 for younger children, later for older groups. Disregarding Farm rules such as safety, fire, bedtime and behavior guidelines can lead to suspension from a farm trip.

The Upper School is made up of the 5th to 8th grades. These grades must complete requirements to graduate from the school, and with helpful staff, all students graduate (unless expelled). The completed requirements from the 7th grade are brought over to the 8th grade when they move up.

The requirements are the following:

- One cooking requirement.
- One use of yeast requirement.
- The participation of two out of the three following classes given at the farm:
  - Meat Production Class
  - Milk Production Class
  - Reproduction Class
- One textiles project completion requirement

== Tuition system ==
Manhattan Country School has a distinctive sliding scale tuition system that was originally known as "Tuition Reform" and is now called the "Family Financial Commitment Plan". The system was designed to eliminate the distinction between "scholarship" and "full tuition" students by encouraging all families to pay for school using a sliding scale tuition based on family income. Families of sufficient means are asked to voluntarily contribute a comparable percentage of their incomes to the percentage asked of other families. The concepts behind the plan were originally developed by Frank Roosevelt and Hugh Southern in the context of intense debates during early years of MCS. That process is described in Frank Roosevelt and Thomas Vitullo-Martin, Tuition Reform for Private Schools: The Manhattan Country School Plan .

That scale is, in part, based on the "cost per child" which is the total budget divided by the number of students (with some adjustment for grade level). "Full tuition" is equal to the cost per child. The principle behind this is that families of means should not be subsidized by annual giving or the endowment; this is in contrast to many other schools which have a "gap" that represents the difference between tuition and the actual cost of educating a child.

Each year, families receive a Family Financial Worksheet which is used to calculate their contracted fee based on household income with an adjustment for assets. Currently the highest rate for tuition is 12 percent of this adjusted figure. Families whose calculated rate yield an among higher than the cost per child are asked to pledge an amount equal to the difference between the two amounts.

== Student body ==
Manhattan Country School was founded with the goal of being a model racially integrated school. Today it remains well known for the diversity of its student body. There is no racial majority. According to the MCS website 45% of the student body is white, 28% is African American, 19% is Hispanic/Latino and 8% is Asian American. About 22% of students define themselves as multiracial or biracial.

Approximately 70 percent of MCS students pay less than the full "cost per child". This is among the highest percentages of students receiving financial aid at any independent school.

Enrollment typically consists of 190 students evenly divided between girls and boys.

== Notable alumni ==
- Daisy von Scherler Mayer
- Trina McGee-Davis
- Kelis Rogers
- John Burnham Schwartz
- Debo Adegbile
- Emory Cohen
- Adrian Bartos

== High school program ==
MCS has a high school counseling program in which school faculty orchestrate a weekly high school placement class for eighth graders. During this class, which begins in the first weeks of school and ends near winter break, Deans or Associate Deans of Admission come to MCS and provide information about the schools that they represent. Schools that have visited MCS include: The Dwight-Englewood School, The Northfield Mount Hermon School, Suffield Academy and The Calhoun school. Only independent day and boarding schools are scheduled for appointments at the school. In addition, eighth graders are equipped with a public school directory book, listing the all public schools in New York City. The same is for parochial schools. An ISEE Test and SSAT guidance course is also offered to eighth graders, taught by an instructor from a testing organization from outside of the school. MCS faculty realize that applying to high schools is a toilsome experience, so students are always welcome to share their feelings with high school counselors in the Third Floor Office.

MCS graduates have enrolled in Packer Collegiate Institute, Ethical Culture Fieldston School, PPAS, Saint Ann's School (Brooklyn), Friends Seminary, Bronx High School of Science, Trinity School (New York City), Fordham Preparatory School, Eleanor Roosevelt High School (New York City), LaGuardia High School, and many others. Some graduates have decided to branch out of the city. Boarding schools that MCS graduates have enrolled in are Groton School, The Lawrenceville School, Westtown School, Williston Northampton School, The Hotchkiss School, Phillips Academy, Northfield Mount Hermon School, and George School.

== Related publications ==
Frank Roosevelt and Thomas Vitullo-Martin, Tuition Reform for Private Schools: The Manhattan Country School Plan
