= Herman Levin =

American theatrical producer

- Herman Levin, 1963
- Born: Herman Nathaniel Levin; December 1, 1907; Philadelphia, Pennsylvania
- Died: December 27, 1990 (aged 83); New York, New York
- Occupation: Theatrical producer
- Notable work: My Fair Lady; Gentleman Prefer Blondes; The Great White Hope
- Awards: Tony Award for Best Musical (1957); Tony Award for Best Play (1969)

Herman Nathaniel Levin (December 1, 1907 – December 27, 1990) was an American attorney and theatrical producer. He is most notable for the original production of My Fair Lady (1956), one of the most successful musicals in Broadway history. He also produced Gentleman Prefer Blondes, and the play The Great White Hope. He won two Tony Awards during his career.

== Early years ==
Levin studied at the University of Missouri and the University of Pennsylvania but did not graduate. He earned a law degree from St. John's University Law School.

== Career ==
Levin began his career working as an official in New York City, eventually progressing to become director of the Welfare Department's Bureau of Licenses. At age 39 he made the transition to producing plays.

== Personal life and death ==
Levin was married three times, with each marriage ending in divorce. He had a daughter., He died at New York Hospital, aged 83, following a stroke.
