= Dirty Dancing (musical) =

Stage musical based on the 1987 film

- Music: Various Artists
- Lyrics: Various Artists
- Book: Eleanor Bergstein
- Basis: Dirty Dancing (1987)
- Productions: National Tour (2026); Broadway (2027)

Dirty Dancing is a jukebox musical featuring a pop music score and a book by Eleanor Bergstein. The musical is based on the 1987 film of the same name also written by Bergstein.

The show tells the story of Frances Houseman, a 17 year old Jewish woman also known in her family as "Baby". When she goes on a vacation with her family to Kellerman's, a borscht belt resort in the Catskill Mountains, her life changes when she meets members of the resort staff, including Johnny Castle, a dance instructor.

The score includes (I've Had) The Time of My Life, which won the Academy Award for Best Original Song for the original film, written by Franke Previte, John DeNicola, and Donald Markowitz.

The show will premiere on Broadway at the Lena Horne Theatre in February 2027.

== Synopsis ==
Frances Houseman goes on her yearly vacation with her family to the Catskill Mountains, but this time she meets members of the resort staff that change her outlook on life forever.

== Production history ==
=== Previous Tours and incarnations ===
Previous incarnations of the show have toured in North America and abroad. There is a separate version of the show with a different creative team that was performed in the West End.

=== National Tour (2026) ===
The musical began a national tour, featuring a revised book by Bergstein and a new creative team, on August 12, 2026, at the Ordway Center for the Performing Arts in St. Paul, Minnesota. The show is set to tour through the fall of 2026, with the final date January 10, 2027, at the Ed Mirvish Theatre in Toronto, Canada.

=== Broadway (2027) ===
The show is set to make its Broadway debut in 2027 at the Lena Horne Theatre, for a limited run through September 6, 2027. Previews are set to begin February 12, 2027, with an opening night of March 14. The cast and creative team from the tour will remain the same. The show will be directed by Lonny Price, who appeared in the original film as Neil Kellerman.

== Original cast and characters ==
| Character | National Tour | Broadway |
| Character | 2026 | 2027 |
|---|---|---|
| Frances "Baby" Houseman | Annalese Starzec | Annalese Starzec |
| Johnny Castle | Blake Zelesnikar | Blake Zelesnikar |
| Penny Johnson, a dancer | Olivia Cece | Olivia Cece |
| Elizabeth, a singer at Kellerman's | Ashley LaLonde | Ashley LaLonde |
| Billy Kostecki, Johnny's cousin | Ethan Peterson | Ethan Peterson |
| Jake Houseman, Baby's father | Bryan Fenkart | Bryan Fenkart |
| Max Kellerman, owner of Kellerman's | Loren Lester | Loren Lester |
| Lisa Houseman, Baby's sister | Lily Kren | Lily Kren |
| Marjorie Houseman, Baby's mother | Gina Lamparella | Gina Lamparella |
| Neil Kellerman, Max's son | Dan Klimko | Dan Klimko |
| Robbie Gould, a waiter | Antony Sanchez | Antony Sanchez |
| Tito Suarez, a singer at Kellerman's | Erick Pinnick | Erick Pinnick |
