= Jed Bernstein =

American arts executive (born 1955)

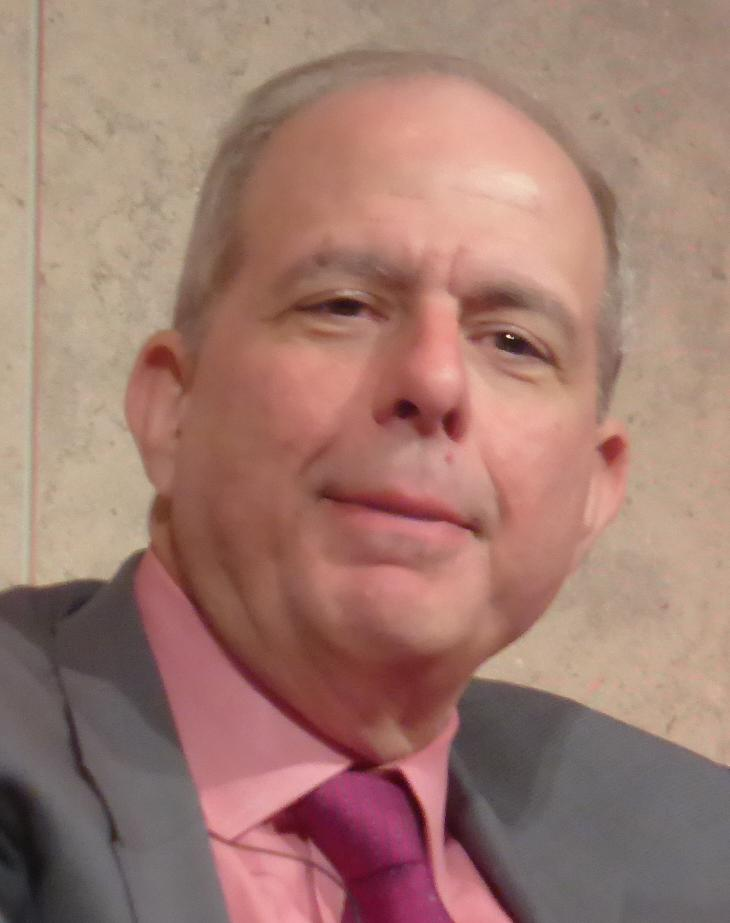
- Jed Bernstein, 2016
- Born: March 27, 1955 (age 71); Upper West Side, New York City
- Education: University of Pennsylvania (BA); Yale School of Management (MBA)
- Occupations: Arts executive, theatrical producer

Jed Bernstein (/bɜːrnstiːn/; born March 27, 1955) is the former president of The Broadway League and of Lincoln Center for the Performing Arts. For more than 25 years, Jed Bernstein has been a leader in theatrical production, venue management, arts administration, and marketing and promotion.

== Career and education ==
Bernstein started his career in the advertising industry, spending 15 years working on corporate accounts at firms that included Ally & Gargano, Wells Rich Greene, and Ogilvy & Mather. He is a graduate of the Yale School of Management, where he received an MBA, and the University of Pennsylvania.

From 1995 to 2006, Bernstein served as the president of The Broadway League, the national trade association for the commercial theater industry. During this time, he also served as co-producer of the Tony Awards telecast.

Bernstein also served as an independent theater producer for such works as Driving Miss Daisy and the 2009 revival of the musical Hair, for which he received a Tony Award for Best Revival of a Musical.

In 2010, he partnered with the Bridge Street Foundation to purchase and renovate the historic Bucks County Playhouse in Bucks County, Pennsylvania. As Producing Director, Bernstein presented year-round theatrical seasons, returning this 75 year old playhouse to the forefront of regional theater.

In 2014, he replaced Reynold Levy as president of Lincoln Center. He resigned from his role on April 14, 2016 after the discovery that he had been in a consensual, but undisclosed relationship with a staff member that he had twice promoted.

In 2017, Bernstein joined Theatre Aspen in Aspen, Colorado as Producing Director, presenting a full summer season and additional program during the off-season months. He started Solo Flights, a series of one-person shows presented festival-style.

He is also the president of Above the Title Entertainment, a theater and television production company and marketing consultancy.

The actress Ellen Foley is married to his brother, Douglas Bernstein.
