= Broadway theatre =

Type of theatre in New York City

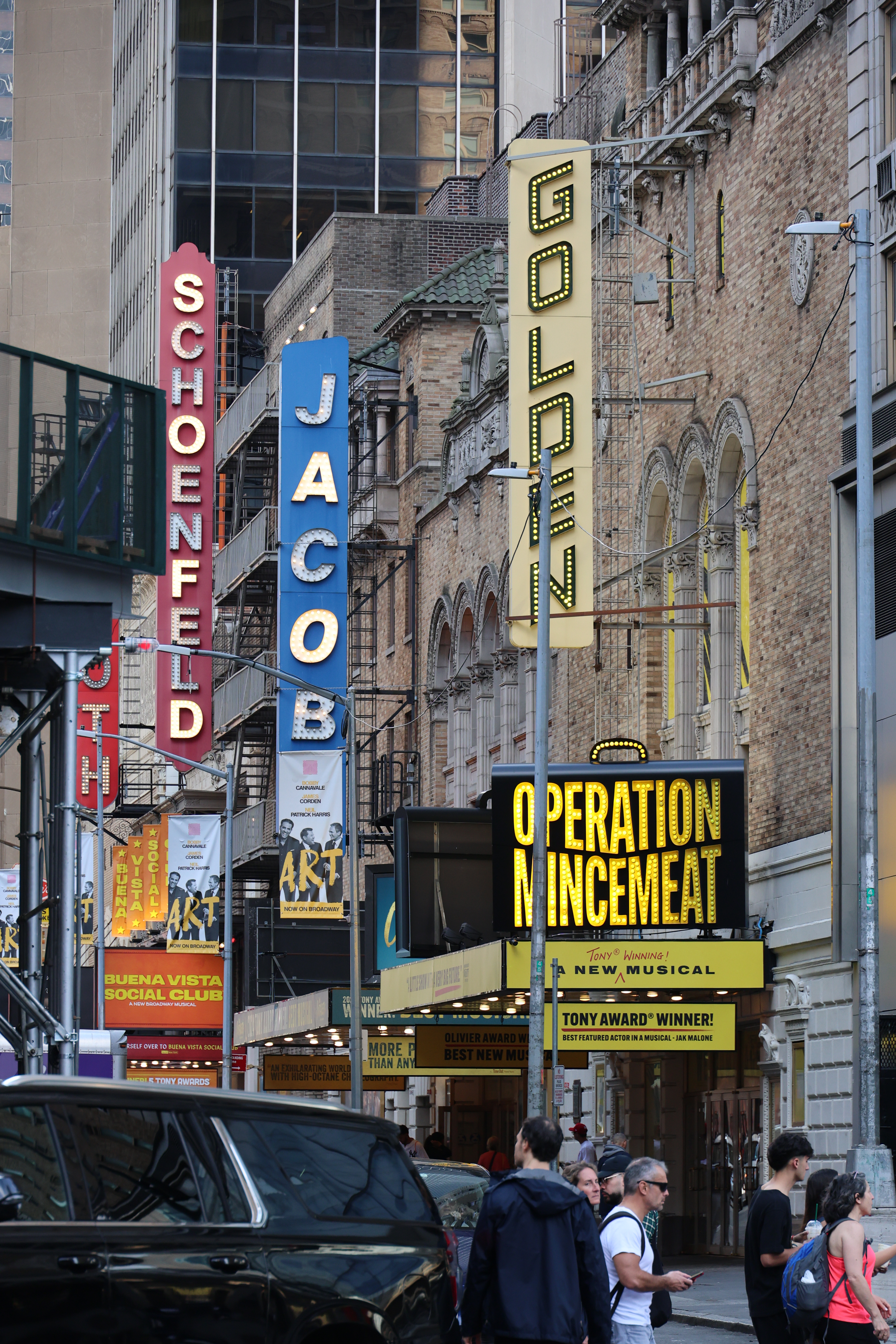
From right to left: the John Golden Theatre, Bernard B. Jacobs Theatre, Gerald Schoenfeld Theatre, and Booth Theatre on West 45th Street in Manhattan's Theater District, running productions of Operation Mincemeat, The Outsiders, and Buena Vista Social Club respectively

Broadway theatre (Note: Although theater is the usual spelling for this noun in the United States (see American and British English spelling differences), many of the Broadway venues use or used the spelling theatre in their names. Many performers and trade groups for live dramatic presentations also use the spelling theatre.) is a theatre genre that consists of the theatrical performances presented in 41 professional theaters, each with 500 or more seats, in the Theater District and Lincoln Center along Broadway, in Midtown Manhattan, New York City. Broadway and London's West End together represent the highest commercial level of live theater in the English-speaking world.

While the Broadway thoroughfare is eponymous with the district, it is closely identified with Times Square. Only three theaters are located on Broadway itself: the Broadway Theatre, Palace Theatre, and Winter Garden Theatre. The rest are located on the numbered cross streets, extending from the Nederlander Theatre one block south of Times Square on West 41st Street, north along either side of Broadway to 53rd Street, and Vivian Beaumont Theater, at Lincoln Center on West 65th Street. While exceptions exist, the term "Broadway theatre" is used predominantly to describe venues with seating capacities of at least 500 people. Smaller theaters in New York City are referred to as off-Broadway, regardless of location, while very small venues with fewer than 100 seats are called off-off-Broadway, a term that can also apply to non-commercial, avant-garde, or productions held outside of traditional theater venues.

The Theater District is an internationally prominent tourist attraction in New York City. According to The Broadway League, shows on Broadway sold tickets worth about US$1.54 billion in the 2022–2023 season, repeating the feat the 2023–2024 season. About 12.3 million people attended per season.

Most Broadway shows are musicals. Historian Martin Shefter argues that "Broadway musicals, culminating in the productions of Rodgers and Hammerstein, became enormously influential forms of American popular culture" and contributed to making New York City the cultural capital of the world.

The Tony Awards presented annually by the American Theatre Wing and The Broadway League recognize excellence in live Broadway theatre and are the American theatre industry's highest honor.

== History ==
=== Early theater in New York ===
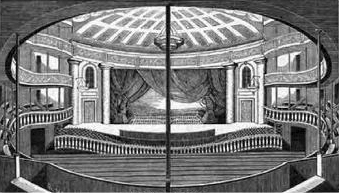
The interior of Park Theatre, built in 1798

New York City's first significant theatre was established in the mid-18th century, around 1750, when actor-managers Walter Murray and Thomas Kean established a resident theatre company at the Theatre on Nassau Street in Lower Manhattan, which held about 280 people. They presented William Shakespeare's plays and ballad operas such as The Beggar's Opera. In 1752, William Hallam sent a company of twelve actors from Britain to the colonies with his brother Lewis as their manager. They established a theatre in Williamsburg, Virginia, and opened with The Merchant of Venice and The Anatomist. The company moved to New York in 1753, performing ballad operas and ballad-farces like Damon and Phillida.

During the Revolutionary War, theatre was suspended in New York City. But after the war's end, theatre resumed in 1798, when the 2,000-seat Park Theatre was built on Chatham Street on present-day Park Row. A second major theatre, Bowery Theatre, opened in 1826, followed by others.

By the 1840s, P.T. Barnum was operating an entertainment complex in Lower Manhattan. In 1829, at Broadway and Prince Street, Niblo's Garden opened and soon became one of New York's premier nightspots. The 3,000-seat theatre presented all sorts of musical and non-musical entertainments. In 1844, Palmo's Opera House opened and presented opera for only four seasons before bankruptcy led to its rebranding as a venue for plays under the name Burton's Theatre. The Astor Opera House opened in 1847. A riot broke out in 1849 when the lower-class patrons of the Bowery Theatre objected to what they perceived as snobbery by the upper-class audiences at Astor Place: "After the Astor Place Riot of 1849, entertainment in New York City was divided along class lines: opera was chiefly for the upper-middle and upper classes, minstrel shows and melodramas for the middle-class, variety shows in concert saloons for men of the working class and the slumming middle-class."

The plays of William Shakespeare were frequently performed on the Broadway stage during the period, most notably by American actor Edwin Booth who was internationally known for his performance as Hamlet. Booth played the role for a famous 100 consecutive performances at the Winter Garden Theatre in 1865 (with the run ending just a few months before Booth's brother John Wilkes Booth assassinated Abraham Lincoln), and would later revive the role at his own Booth's Theatre (which was managed for a time by his brother Junius Brutus Booth Jr.). Other renowned Shakespeareans who appeared in New York in this era were Henry Irving, Tommaso Salvini, Fanny Davenport, and Charles Fechter.

=== Birth of the musical and post-Civil War ===
Theatre in New York moved from Downtown gradually to Midtown Manhattan, beginning around 1850, seeking less expensive real estate. At the beginning of the nineteenth century, the area that now comprises the Theater District was owned by a handful of families and comprised a few farms. In 1836, Mayor Cornelius Lawrence opened 42nd Street and invited Manhattanites to "enjoy the pure clean air." Close to 60 years later, theatrical entrepreneur Oscar Hammerstein I built the iconic Victoria Theater on West 42nd Street.

Broadway's first "long-run" musical was a 50-performance hit called The Elves in 1857. In 1870, the heart of Broadway was in Union Square, and by the end of the century, many theatres were near Madison Square. Theatres arrived in the Times Square area in the early 1900s, and the Broadway theatres consolidated there after a large number were built around the square in the 1920s and 1930s. New York runs continued to lag far behind those in London, but Laura Keene's "musical burletta" The Seven Sisters (1860) shattered previous New York records with a run of 253 performances.

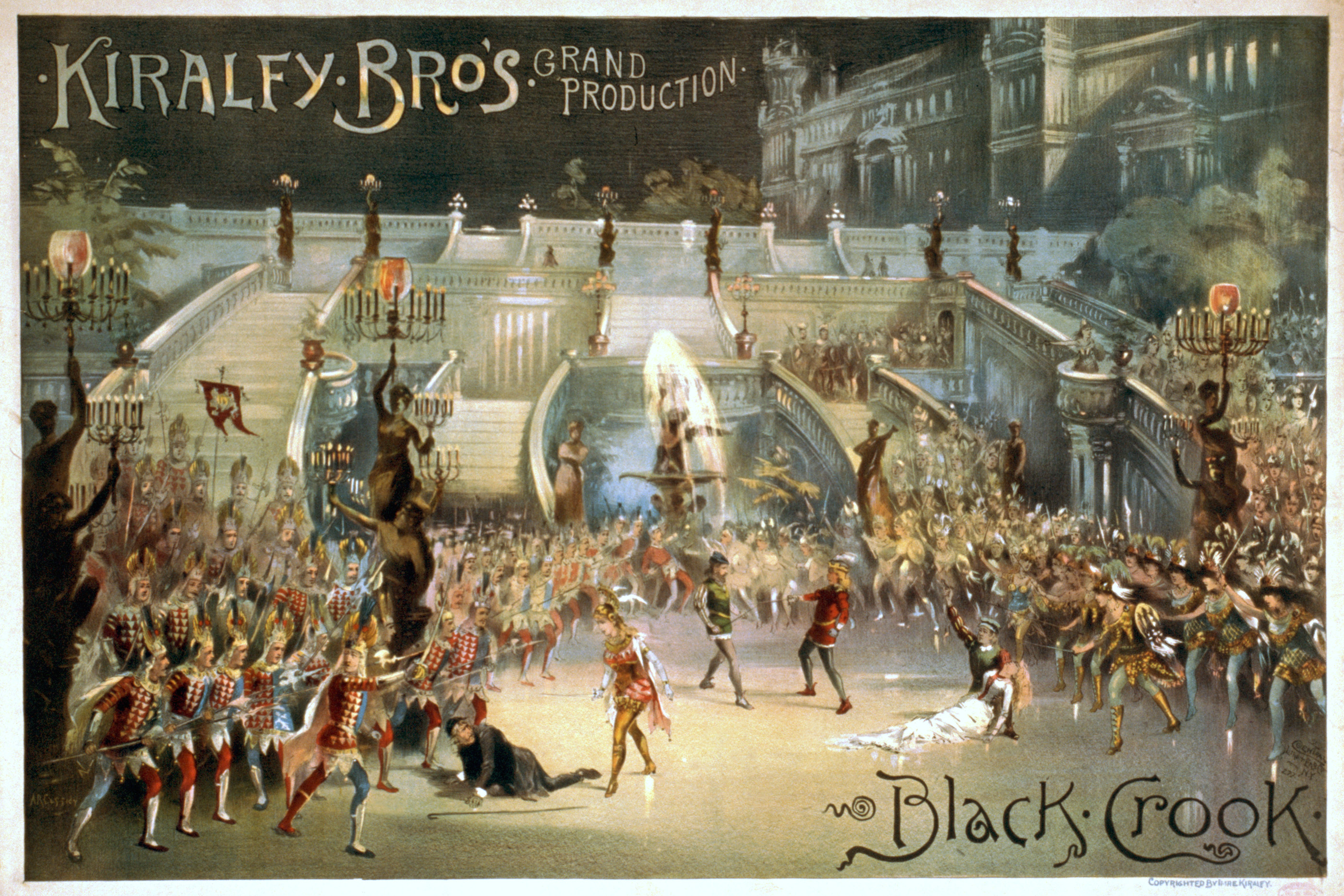
The Black Crook (1866), considered by some historians to be the first musical. Poster for the 1873 revival by The Kiralfy Brothers.

The first theatre piece that conforms to the modern conception of a musical, adding dance and original music that helped to tell the story, is considered to be The Black Crook, which premiered in New York on September 12, 1866. The production was five-and-a-half hours long, but despite its length, it ran for a record-breaking 474 performances. The same year, The Black Domino/Between You, Me and the Post was the first show to call itself a "musical comedy".

Tony Pastor opened the first vaudeville theatre one block east of Union Square in 1881, where Lillian Russell performed. Comedians Edward Harrigan and Tony Hart produced and starred in musicals on Broadway between 1878 (The Mulligan Guard Picnic) and 1890, with book and lyrics by Harrigan and music by his father-in-law David Braham. These musical comedies featured characters and situations taken from the everyday life of New York's lower classes and represented a significant step forward from vaudeville and burlesque, towards a more literate form. They starred high-quality professional singers (Lillian Russell, Vivienne Segal, and Fay Templeton), instead of the amateurs, often sex workers, who had starred in earlier musical forms.

As transportation improved, poverty in New York diminished, and street lighting made for safer travel at night, the number of potential patrons for the growing number of theatres increased enormously. Plays could run longer and still draw in the audiences, leading to better profits and improved production values. As in England, during the latter half of the century, the theatre began to be cleaned up, with less prostitution hindering the attendance of the theatre by women. Gilbert and Sullivan's family-friendly comic opera hits, beginning with H.M.S. Pinafore in 1878, were imported to New York (by the authors and also in numerous unlicensed productions). They were imitated in New York by American productions such as Reginald Dekoven's Robin Hood (1891) and John Philip Sousa's El Capitan (1896), along with operas, ballets, and other British and European hits.

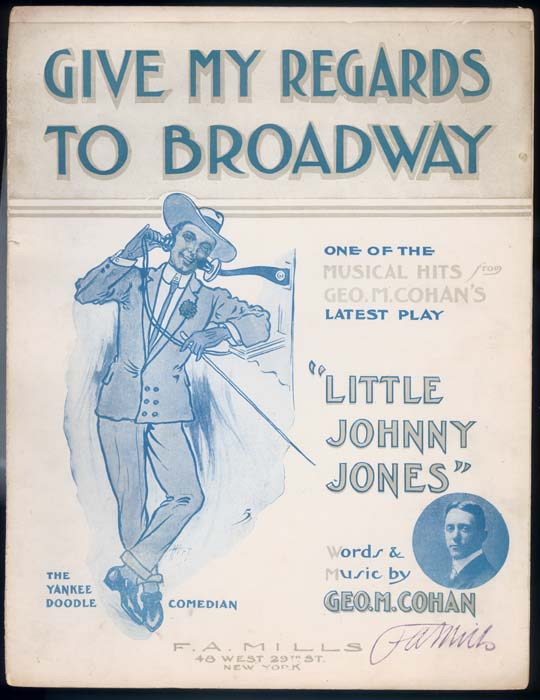
Sheet music to "Give My Regards to Broadway"

Charles H. Hoyt's show A Trip to Chinatown (1891) became Broadway's long-run champion when it surpassed Adonis and its 603 total performances in 1893, holding the stage for 657 performances. Chinatown itself was surpassed by the musical Irene (1919) in 1921 as the longest-running Broadway musical, and even earlier, in March 1920, by Lightnin' (1918) as the longest-running Broadway show. In 1896, theatre owners Marc Klaw and A. L. Erlanger formed the Theatrical Syndicate, which controlled almost every legitimate theatre in the U.S. for the next sixteen years. However, smaller vaudeville and variety houses proliferated, and Off-Broadway was well established by the end of the nineteenth century.

A Trip to Coontown (1898) was the first musical comedy entirely produced and performed by African Americans in a Broadway theatre (inspired largely by the routines of the minstrel shows), followed by the ragtime-tinged Clorindy: The Origin of the Cakewalk (1898), and the highly successful In Dahomey (1902). Hundreds of musical comedies were staged on Broadway in the 1890s and early 1900s made up of songs written in New York's Tin Pan Alley involving composers such as Gus Edwards, John Walter Bratton, and George M. Cohan (Little Johnny Jones (1904), 45 Minutes From Broadway (1906), and George Washington Jr. (1906)). Still, New York runs continued to be relatively short, with a few exceptions, compared with London runs, until World War I. A few very successful British musicals continued to achieve great success in New York, including Florodora in 1900–01.

=== Early 20th century ===
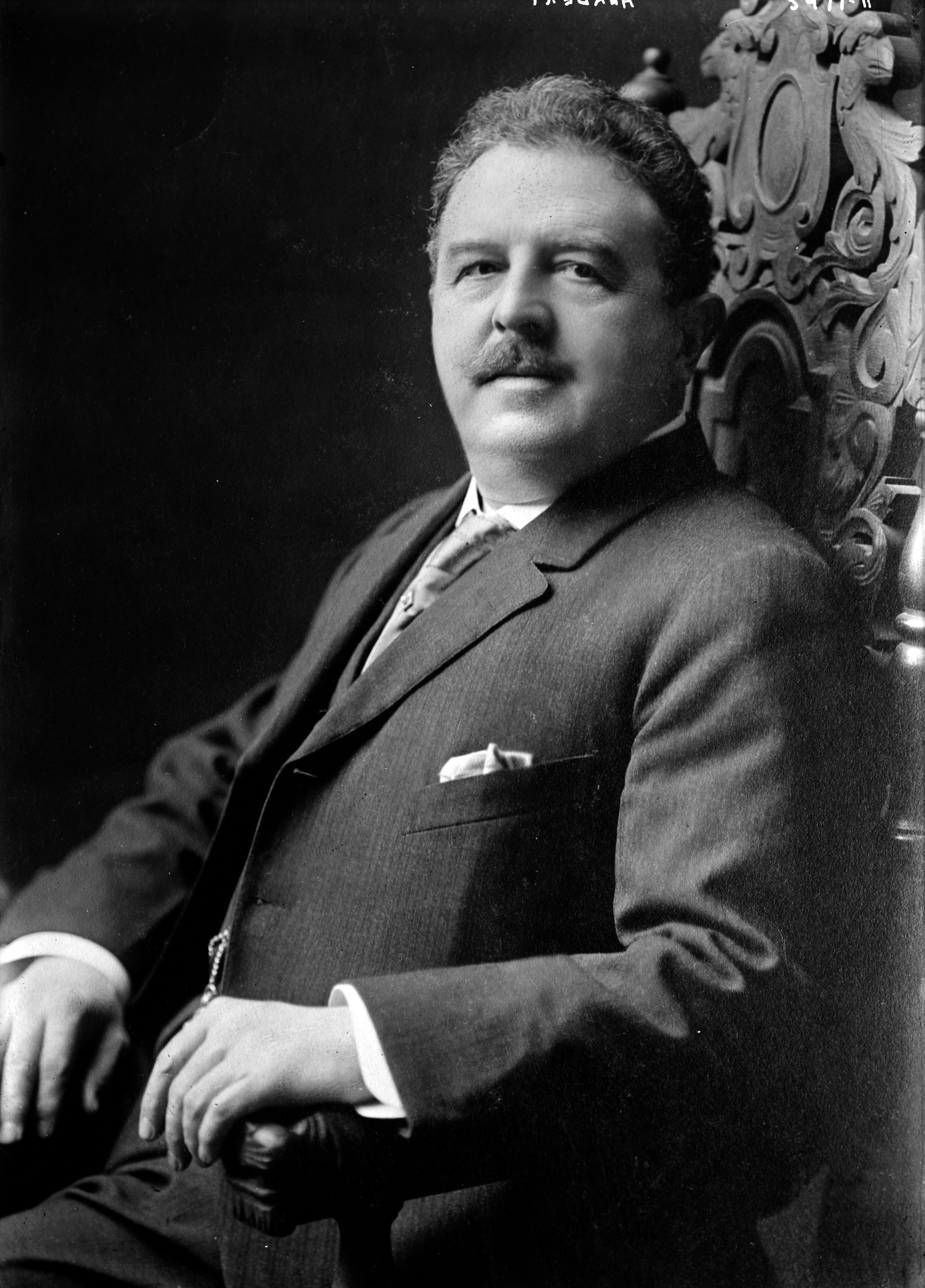
Victor Herbert

In the early years of the twentieth century, translations of popular late-nineteenth century continental operettas were joined by the "Princess Theatre" shows of the 1910s, by writers such as P. G. Wodehouse, Guy Bolton, and Harry B. Smith. Victor Herbert, whose work included some intimate musical plays with modern settings as well as his string of famous operettas (The Fortune Teller (1898), Babes in Toyland (1903), Mlle. Modiste (1905), The Red Mill (1906), and Naughty Marietta (1910)).

Beginning with The Red Mill, Broadway shows installed electric signs outside the theatres. Since colored bulbs burned out too quickly, white lights were used, and Broadway was nicknamed "The Great White Way". In August 1919, the Actors' Equity Association demanded a standard contract for all professional productions. After a strike shut down all the theatres, the producers were forced to agree. By the 1920s, the Shubert Brothers had risen to take over the majority of the theatres from the Erlanger syndicate.

During this time, the play Lightnin' by Winchell Smith and Frank Bacon became the first Broadway show to reach 700 performances. From then, it would go on to become the first show to reach 1,000 performances. Lightnin' was the longest-running Broadway show until being overtaken in performance totals by Abie's Irish Rose in 1925.

=== Competing with motion pictures ===
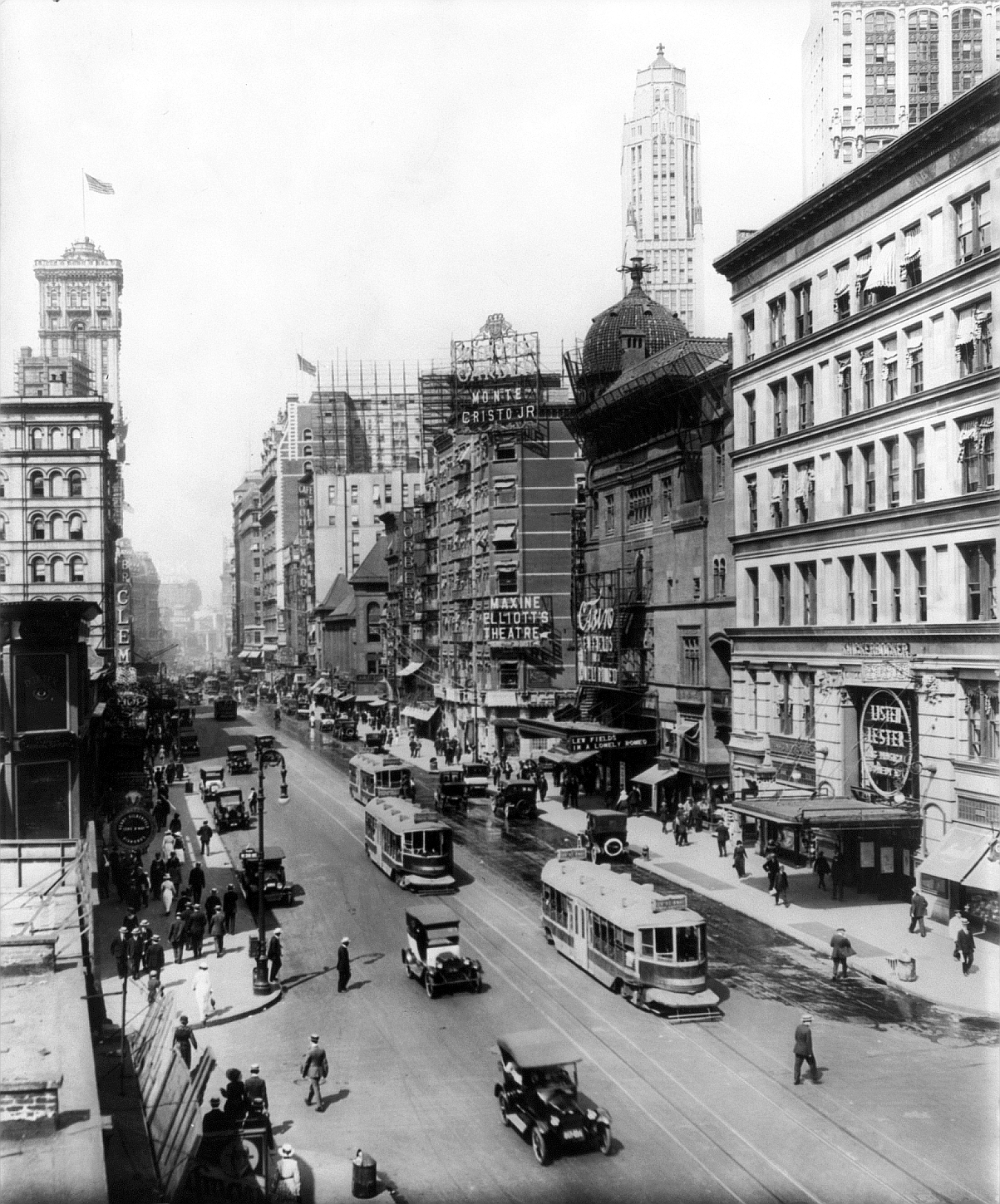
Broadway north from 38th St., New York City, showing the Casino and Knickerbocker Theatres ("Listen, Lester", visible at lower right, played the Knickerbocker from December 23, 1918, to August 16, 1919), a sign pointing to Maxine Elliott's Theatre, which is out of view on 39th Street, and a sign advertising the Winter Garden Theatre, which is out of view at 50th Street. All but the Winter Garden are demolished. The old Metropolitan Opera House and the old Times Tower are visible on the left.

The motion picture mounted a challenge to the stage. At first, films were silent and presented only limited competition. By the end of the 1920s, films like The Jazz Singer were presented with synchronized sound, and critics wondered if cinema would replace live theatre altogether. While live vaudeville could not compete with these inexpensive films that featured vaudeville stars and major comedians of the day, other theatres survived. The musicals of the Roaring Twenties, borrowing from vaudeville, music hall, and other light entertainment, tended to ignore plot in favor of emphasizing star actors and actresses, big dance routines, and popular songs.

Florenz Ziegfeld produced annual spectacular song-and-dance revues on Broadway featuring extravagant sets and elaborate costumes, but there was little to tie the various numbers together. Typical of the 1920s were lighthearted productions such as Sally; Lady Be Good; Sunny; No, No, Nanette; Harlem; Oh, Kay!; and Funny Face. Their books may have been forgettable, but they produced enduring standards from George Gershwin, Cole Porter, Jerome Kern, Vincent Youmans, and Rodgers and Hart, among others, and Noël Coward, Sigmund Romberg, and Rudolf Friml continued in the vein of Victor Herbert. Live theatre has survived since the invention of cinema.

=== Between the wars ===
Leaving these comparatively frivolous entertainments behind and taking the drama a step forward, Show Boat premiered on December 27, 1927, at the Ziegfeld Theatre. It represented a complete integration of book and score, with dramatic themes, as told through the music, dialogue, setting, and movement, woven together more seamlessly than in previous musicals. It ran for 572 performances.

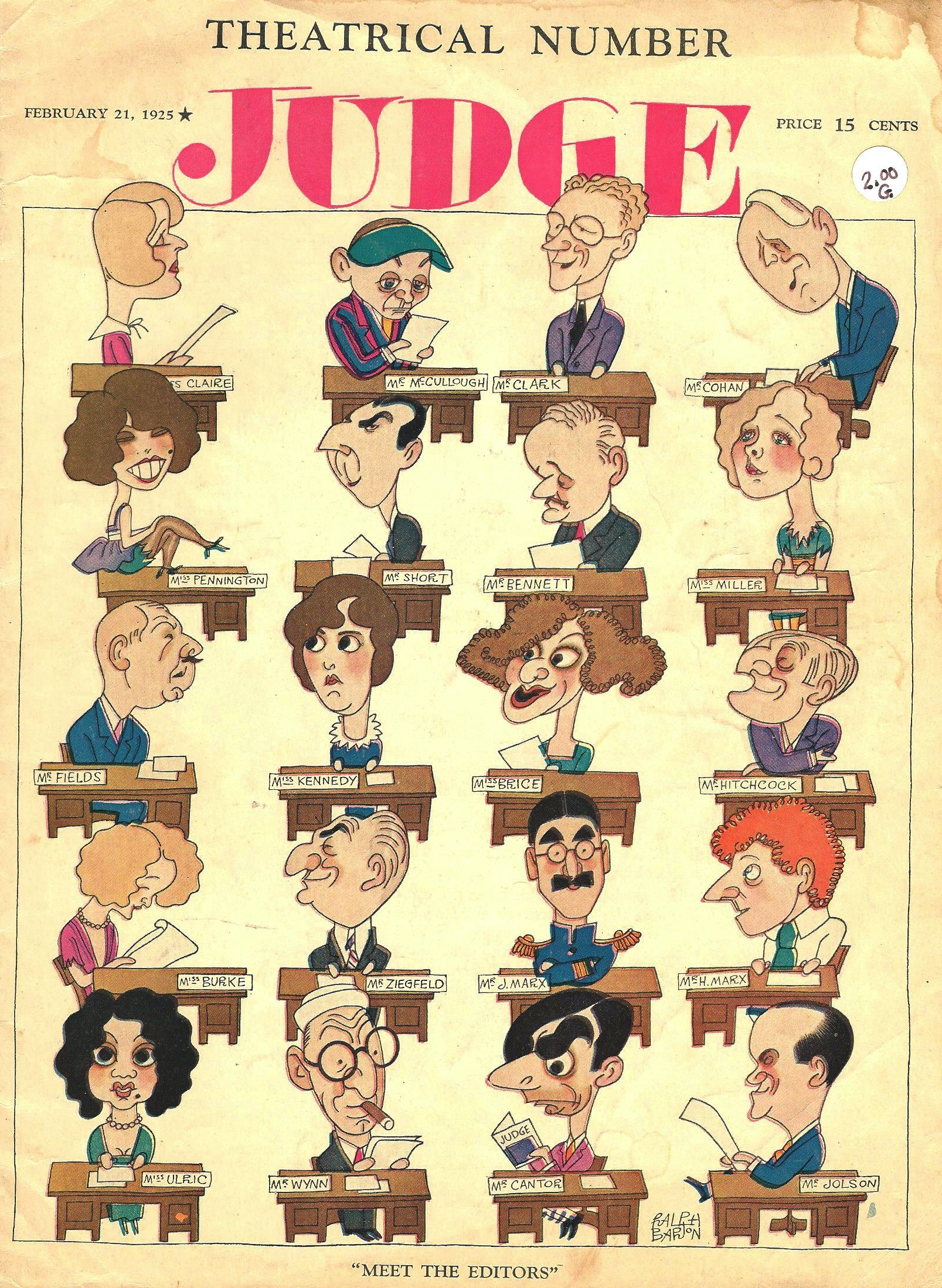
This February 21, 1925 Judge magazine cover by Ralph Barton features caricatures of various movie and theater personalities from the 1920s; click on a caricature to be taken to the corresponding person's Wikipedia article.

The 1920s also spawned a new age of American playwright with the emergence of Eugene O'Neill, whose plays Beyond the Horizon, Anna Christie, The Hairy Ape, Strange Interlude, and Mourning Becomes Electra proved that there was an audience for serious drama on Broadway, and O'Neill's success paved the way for major dramatists like Elmer Rice, Maxwell Anderson, Robert E. Sherwood, Clifford Odets, Tennessee Williams, and Arthur Miller, as well as writers of comedy like George S. Kaufman and Moss Hart. Classical revivals also proved popular with Broadway theatre-goers, notably John Barrymore in Hamlet and Richard III, John Gielgud in Hamlet, The Importance of Being Earnest and Much Ado About Nothing, Walter Hampden and José Ferrer in Cyrano de Bergerac, Paul Robeson and Ferrer in Othello, Maurice Evans in Richard II and the plays of George Bernard Shaw, and Katharine Cornell in such plays as Romeo and Juliet, Antony and Cleopatra, and Candida.

In 1930, Theatre Guild's production of Roar, China! was Broadway's first play with a majority Asian cast.

As World War II approached, a dozen Broadway dramas addressed the rise of Nazism in Europe and the issue of American non-intervention. The most successful was Lillian Hellman's Watch on the Rhine, which opened in April 1941.

=== Postwar era ===
After the lean years of the Great Depression, Broadway theatre had entered a golden age with the blockbuster hit Oklahoma!, in 1943, which ran for 2,212 performances. According to John Kenrick's writings on Broadway musicals, "Every season saw new stage musicals send songs to the top of the charts. Public demand, a booming economy and abundant creative talent kept Broadway hopping. To this day, the shows of the 1950s form the core of the musical theatre repertory."

=== Decline in late 1960s ===
Kenrick notes that "the late 1960s marked a time of cultural upheaval. All those changes would prove painful for many, including those behind the scenes, as well as those in the audience." Of the 1970s, Kenrick writes: "Just when it seemed that traditional book musicals were back in style, the decade ended with critics and audiences giving mixed signals."

Ken Bloom observed that "The 1960s and 1970s saw a worsening of the area [Times Square] and a drop in the number of legitimate shows produced on Broadway." By way of comparison, in the 1950 to 1951 season (May to May), 94 productions opened on Broadway; in the 1969 to 1970 season (June to May), there were 59 productions (fifteen were revivals). In the 1920s, there were 70–80 theaters; however, by 1969, there were 36 left.

During this time, many Broadway productions struggled due to low attendance rates, which resulted in perceived mediocrity among such plays. For this reason, the Theatre Development Fund was created with the purpose of assisting productions with high cultural value that likely would struggle without subsidization, by offering tickets to those plays to consumers at reduced prices.

=== Resurgence in early 1980s ===
In early 1982, Joe Papp, the theatrical producer and director who established The Public Theater, led the "Save the Theatres" campaign. It was a not-for-profit group supported by the Actors Equity union to save the theater buildings in the neighborhood from demolition by monied Manhattan development interests. Papp provided resources, recruited a publicist and celebrated actors, and provided audio, lighting, and technical crews for the effort.

At Papp's behest, in July 1982, a bill was introduced in the 97th Congress, entitled "H.R.6885, A bill to designate the Broadway/Times Square Theatre District in the City of New York as a national historic site". The legislation would have provided certain U.S. government resources and assistance to help the city preserve the district. Faced with strong opposition and lobbying by Mayor Ed Koch's Administration and corporate Manhattan development interests, the bill was not passed. The Save the Theatres campaign then turned their efforts to supporting the establishment of the Theater District as a registered historic district. In December 1983, Save the Theatres prepared "The Broadway Theater District, a Preservation Development and Management Plan", and demanded that each theater in the district receive landmark designation. Mayor Ed Koch ultimately reacted by creating a Theater Advisory Council, which included Papp.

=== 2020s: COVID-19 and aftermath ===
Due to the COVID-19 pandemic in New York City, Broadway theaters closed on March 12, 2020, shuttering 16 shows that were playing or were in the process of opening. The Broadway League shutdown was extended multiple times as 2020 passed into 2021. Governor Andrew Cuomo announced that most sectors of New York would have their restrictions lifted on May 19, 2021, but he stated that Broadway theatres would not be able to immediately resume performances on this date due to logistical reasons. In May 2021, Cuomo set a target that Broadway theaters should be allowed to reopen on September 14. The League confirmed that performances would resume in the fall season.

Springsteen on Broadway became the first full-length show to resume performances, opening on June 26, 2021, to 1,721 vaccinated patrons at the St. James Theatre. Pass Over then had its first preview on August 4, and opened on August 22, 2021, becoming the first new play to open. Hadestown and Waitress were the first musicals to resume performances on September 2, 2021. The 74th Tony Awards were also postponed; the Tony nominations were announced on October 15, 2020, and took place on September 26, 2021. On July 30, 2021, it was announced that all Broadway theaters required attendees aged 12+ to provide proof of full COVID-19 vaccination. Those under age 12 were required to provide a negative COVID-19 test (PCR within 72 hours or antigen within six hours of the performance start time). Beginning November 8, those ages 5–11 also had the option to provide proof of at least one vaccination shot. Effective December 14, in accordance with NYC's vaccination mandate, guests ages 5–11 were required to have at least one vaccination shot until January 29, 2022, where they had to be fully vaccinated. The vaccine mandate lasted until April 30, and attendees were also required to wear face masks until July 1.

During the COVID-19 shutdown, the Shubert Organization, the Nederlander Organization, and Jujamcyn had pledged to increase racial and cultural diversity in their theaters, including naming at least one theater for a Black theatrical personality. The August Wilson Theatre, owned by Jujamcyn, had been renamed after Black playwright August Wilson in 2005. The Shuberts announced in March 2022 that the Cort Theatre, which was under renovation at the time, would be renamed after actor James Earl Jones. In June 2022, the Nederlanders announced that the Brooks Atkinson Theatre would be renamed after Lena Horne, The James Earl Jones Theatre was rededicated in September 2022, while the Lena Horne Theatre was rededicated that November.

While existing musicals and revivals continued with acceptable returns post-2021, most newly-created musicals have struggled in the post-coronavirus era. As of January 2026, just four post-2021 musicals reported profits: MJ, & Juliet, Six, and The Outsiders. Various explanations have been offered. Putting on a musical is substantially more expensive than earlier, with more money tied up in salaries, equipment, rent, and fees; but ticket prices have not risen proportionately. The pandemic meant a glut of shows were written and waiting to be performed, then all competed with each other for attention in a short period.

== Description ==
=== Schedule ===
Although there are some exceptions, shows with open-ended runs generally have evening performances Tuesday through Saturday, with a 7:00 p.m. or 8:00 p.m. "curtain". The afternoon "matinée" performances are at 2:00 p.m. on Wednesdays and Saturdays and at 3:00 p.m. on Sundays. This makes for an eight-performance week. On this schedule, most shows do not play on Monday and the shows and theatres are said to be "dark" on that day. The actors and the crew in these shows tend to regard Sunday evening through Monday evening as their weekend. The Tony award presentation ceremony is usually held on a Sunday evening in June to fit this schedule.

In recent years, some shows have moved their Tuesday show time an hour earlier to 7:00 pm. The rationale for this move was that since fewer tourists take in shows midweek, Tuesday attendance depends more on local patrons. The earlier curtain makes it possible for suburban patrons to get home by a reasonable hour after the show. Some shows, especially those Disney produces, change their performance schedules fairly frequently depending on the season. This is done in order to maximize access to their target audience.

=== Producers and theatre owners ===
Most Broadway producers and theatre owners are members of The Broadway League (formerly "The League of American Theatres and Producers"), a trade organization that promotes Broadway theatre as a whole, negotiates contracts with the various theatrical unions and agreements with the guilds, and co-administers the Tony Awards with the American Theatre Wing, a service organization. While the League and the theatrical unions are sometimes at loggerheads during those periods when new contracts are being negotiated, they also cooperate on many projects and events designed to promote professional theatre in New York.

All four of the four non-profit theatre companies with Broadway theatres (Lincoln Center Theater, Manhattan Theatre Club, Roundabout Theatre Company, and Second Stage Theatre) belong to the League of Resident Theatres and have contracts with the theatrical unions which are negotiated separately from the other Broadway theatre and producers. (Disney also negotiates apart from the League, as did Livent before it closed down its operations.)

The majority of Broadway theatres are owned or managed by three organizations: the Shubert Organization, a for-profit arm of the non-profit Shubert Foundation, which owns seventeen theatres; the Nederlander Organization, which controls nine theatres; and ATG Entertainment, which owns seven Broadway houses.

=== Personnel ===
Both musicals and straight plays on Broadway often rely on casting well-known performers in leading roles to draw larger audiences or bring in new audience members to the theatre. Actors from film and television are frequently cast for the revivals of Broadway shows or are used to replace actors leaving a cast. There are still, however, performers who are primarily stage actors, spending most of their time "on the boards", and appearing in screen roles only secondarily. As Patrick Healy of The New York Times noted:

Broadway once had many homegrown stars who committed to working on a show for a year, as Nathan Lane has for The Addams Family. In 2010, some theater heavyweights like Mr. Lane were not even nominated; instead, several Tony Awards were given for productions that were always intended to be short-timers on Broadway, given that many of their film-star performers had to move on to other commitments.

According to Mark Shenton, "One of the biggest changes to the commercial theatrical landscape—on both sides of the Atlantic—over the past decade or so is that sightings of big star names turning out to do plays has [sic] gone up; but the runs they are prepared to commit to has gone down. Time was that a producer would require a minimum commitment from his star of six months, and perhaps a year; now, the 13-week run is the norm."

The minimum size of the Broadway orchestra is governed by an agreement with the musicians' union (Local 802, American Federation of Musicians) and The Broadway League. For example, the agreement specifies the minimum size of the orchestra at the Minskoff Theatre to be eighteen, while at the Music Box Theatre it is nine.

=== Runs ===
Most Broadway shows are commercial productions intended to make a profit for the producers and investors ("backers" or "angels"), and therefore have open-ended runs (duration that the production plays), meaning that the length of their presentation is not set beforehand, but depends on critical response, word of mouth, and the effectiveness of the show's advertising, all of which determine ticket sales. Investing in a commercial production carries a varied degree of financial risk. Shows need not make a profit immediately; should they make their "nut" (weekly operating expenses), or lose money at a rate acceptable to the producers, they may continue to run in the expectation that, eventually, they will pay back their initial costs and become profitable. In some borderline situations, producers may ask that royalties be temporarily reduced or waived, or even that performers—with the permission of their unions—take reduced salaries, to prevent a show from closing. Theatre owners, who are not generally profit participants in most productions, may waive or reduce rents, or even lend money to a show to keep it running.

Some Broadway shows are produced by non-commercial organizations as part of a regular subscription season—Lincoln Center Theatre, Roundabout Theatre Company, Manhattan Theatre Club, and Second Stage Theater are the four non-profit theatre companies that currently have permanent Broadway venues. Some other productions are produced on Broadway with "limited engagement runs" for several reasons, including financial issues, prior engagements of the performers, or temporary availability of a theatre between the end of one production and the beginning of another. However, some shows with planned limited engagement runs may, after critical acclaim or box office success, extend their engagements or convert to open-ended runs. This was the case with 2007's August: Osage County, 2009's God of Carnage, 2012's Newsies, and 2022's Take Me Out.

Historically, musicals on Broadway tend to have longer runs than "straight" (i.e., non-musical) plays. On January 9, 2006, The Phantom of the Opera at the Majestic Theatre became the longest-running Broadway musical, with 7,486 performances, overtaking Cats. The Phantom of the Opera closed on Broadway on April 16, 2023, soon after celebrating its 35th anniversary, after a total of 13,981 performances.

=== Audience ===
Attending a Broadway show is a common tourist activity in New York. The TKTS booths sell same-day tickets (and in certain cases, next-day matinee tickets) for many Broadway and Off-Broadway shows at a discount of 20 to 50%. The TKTS booths are located in Times Square, in Lower Manhattan, and at Lincoln Center. This service is run by Theatre Development Fund. Many Broadway theatres also offer special student rates, same-day "rush" or "lottery" tickets, or standing-room tickets to help ensure that their theatres are as full—and their grosses as high—as possible.

According to The Broadway League, total Broadway attendance was 14.77 million in 2018–2019, compared to 13.79 million in 2017–2018. The average age of the Broadway audience in the 2017–18 theater season was 40, the lowest it had been in nearly two decades. By 2018, about 20% of Broadway tickets were sold to international visitors, although many visitors reported not being able to use their tickets. In 2022–2023, the first full season since the COVID-19 pandemic, Broadway theaters sold 12.3 million tickets, of which 35% were to local residents and 17% to international visitors. At the time, the average age of theatergoers was 40.4; nearly two-thirds of the audience were women; and 29% identified as a racial minority.

=== Off-Broadway and off-off-Broadway ===
The classification of theatres is governed by language in Actors' Equity Association contracts. To be eligible for a Tony, a production must be in a house with 500 seats or more and in the Theater District, which are the criteria that define Broadway theatre. Off-Broadway and off-off-Broadway shows often provide a more experimental, challenging, and intimate performance than is possible in the larger Broadway theatres. Some Broadway shows, however, such as the musicals Hair, Little Shop of Horrors, Spring Awakening, Next to Normal, Rent, Avenue Q, In the Heights, Fun Home, A Chorus Line, Dear Evan Hansen, and Hamilton, began their runs Off-Broadway and later transferred to Broadway, seeking to replicate their intimate experience in a larger theatre. Other productions are first developed through workshops and then out-of-town tryouts before transferring to Broadway. Merrily We Roll Along famously skipped an out-of-town tryout and attempted to do an in-town tryout—actually preview performances—on Broadway before its official opening, with disastrous results.

=== Broadway national tours ===
After, or even during, successful runs in Broadway theatres, producers often remount their productions with new casts and crew for the Broadway national tour, which travels to theatres in major cities across the country. Sometimes when a show closes on Broadway, the entire production, with most if not all of the original cast intact, is relaunched as a touring company, hence the name "Broadway national tour". Some shows may even have several touring companies out at a time, whether the show is still running in New York or not, with many companies "sitting down" in other major cities for their own extended runs. For Broadway national tours of top-tier cities, the entire Broadway production is transplanted almost entirely intact and may run for many months (or years) at each stop. For example, the first U.S. tour of The Phantom of the Opera required 26 53-foot-long (16.1 m) semi-trailers to transport all its sets, equipment, and costumes, and it took almost 10 days to properly unload all those trucks and install everything into a theater.

Second-tier and smaller cities can also attract national tours, but these are more likely to be "bus and truck" tours. These are scaled-down versions of the larger, national touring productions, historically acquiring their name because the casts generally traveled by bus instead of by air, while the sets and equipment traveled by truck. Tours of this type often run for weeks rather than months, and frequently feature a reduced physical production to accommodate smaller venues and tighter schedules, and to fit into fewer trucks. A typical second-tier city can usually sell only up to about eight shows (one week) of tickets. For cities smaller than that, a touring production might move twice a week ("split weeks") or every day ("one-nighters"). For "bus and truck" tours, the production values are usually less lavish than the typical Broadway national tour or national touring production, and the actors, while still members of the actors' union, are compensated under a different, less lucrative union contract. The Touring Broadway Awards, presented by The Broadway League, honored excellence in touring Broadway.

=== Awards ===
Broadway productions and artists are honored by the annual Antoinette Perry Awards (commonly called the "Tony Awards", or "Tonys"), given by the American Theatre Wing and The Broadway League, and that were first presented in 1947. The Tony is Broadway's most prestigious award, comparable to the Academy Awards for Hollywood film productions. Their importance has increased since 1967 when the awards presentation show began to be broadcast on national television. In a strategy to improve the television ratings, celebrities are often chosen to host the show, some with scant connection to the theatre. The most recent Tony Awards ceremony was held on June 7, 2026. Other awards given to Broadway productions include the Drama Desk Award, presented since 1955, the New York Drama Critics' Circle Awards, first given in 1936, and the Outer Critics Circle Award, initially presented in 1950.

== Broadway theaters and current productions ==
- An * after the opening date indicates that the listed production has yet to open and is scheduled for the given date at that theater.
- An * after the closing date indicates that there is another show scheduled for that theater.
- If the next show planned is not announced, the applicable columns are left blank.
- Capacity is based on the capacity given for the respective theater at the Internet Broadway Database.

Theater	Address	Capacity	Owner/Operator	Current production	Type	Opening	Closing
Al Hirschfeld Theatre	W. 45th St. (No. 302)	1424	ATG Entertainment	Now You See Me Live	Special	November 11, 2026	January 3, 2027*
Ambassador Theatre	W. 49th St. (No. 219)	1125	Shubert Organization	Chicago	Musical	November 14, 1996	Open-ended
August Wilson Theatre	W. 52nd St. (No. 245)	1228	ATG Entertainment	Paranormal Activity	Play	August 25, 2026	February 28, 2027*
Belasco Theatre	W. 44th St. (No. 111)	1018	Shubert Organization	Maybe Happy Ending	Musical	November 12, 2024	Open-ended
Bernard B. Jacobs Theatre	W. 45th St. (No. 242)	1078	Shubert Organization	The Outsiders	Musical	April 11, 2024	Open-ended
Booth Theatre	W. 45th St. (No. 222)	766	Shubert Organization	Downstate	Play	November 15, 2026	February 14, 2027*
Broadhurst Theatre	W. 44th St. (No. 235)	1186	Shubert Organization	It's a Wonderful Life: A Live Radio Play	Play	November 18, 2026	January 3, 2027*
Broadway Theatre	W. 53rd St & Broadway (No. 1681)	1761	Shubert Organization	The Great Gatsby	Musical	April 25, 2024	Open-ended
Circle in the Square Theatre	W. 50th St. (No. 235)	840	Independent	Just in Time	Musical	April 26, 2025	Open-ended
Ethel Barrymore Theatre	W. 47th St. (No. 243)	1096	Shubert Organization	Here There Are Blueberries	Play	November 9, 2026	January 10, 2027*
Eugene O'Neill Theatre	W. 49th St. (No. 230)	1066	ATG Entertainment	The Book of Mormon	Musical	March 24, 2011	Open-ended
Gerald Schoenfeld Theatre	W. 45th St. (No. 236)	1079	Shubert Organization	Buena Vista Social Club	Musical	March 19, 2025	January 17, 2027
Gershwin Theatre	W. 51st St. (No. 222)	1933	Nederlander Organization	Wicked	Musical	October 30, 2003	Open-ended
Hayes Theater	W. 44th St. (No. 240)	597	Second Stage Theater	The Fantasticks	Musical	November 16, 2026	February 7, 2027*
Hudson Theatre	W. 44th St. (No. 141)	970	ATG Entertainment	Other Desert Cities	Play	October 18, 2026	January 17, 2027*
Imperial Theatre	W. 45th St. (No. 249)	1443	Shubert Organization	860	Play	October 21, 2026	February 14, 2027
James Earl Jones Theatre	W. 48th St. (No. 138)	1084	Shubert Organization	Wanted: The Legend of the Sisters Clarke	Musical	November 8, 2026	Open-ended
John Golden Theatre	W. 45th St. (No. 252)	805	Shubert Organization	Operation Mincemeat	Musical	March 20, 2025	Open-ended
Lena Horne Theatre	W. 47th St. (No. 256)	1094	Nederlander Organization	Six	Musical	October 3, 2021	January 3, 2027*
Longacre Theatre	W. 48th St. (No. 220)	1091	Shubert Organization	Two Strangers (Carry a Cake Across New York)	Musical	November 20, 2025	November 29, 2026*
Lunt-Fontanne Theatre	W. 46th St. (No. 205)	1519	Nederlander Organization	Blue Man Group: A New Holiday Surprise	Special	November 17, 2026	January 3, 2027*
Lyceum Theatre	W. 45th St. (No. 149)	922	Shubert Organization	Oh, Mary!	Play	July 11, 2024	Open-ended
Lyric Theatre	W. 43rd St. (No. 214)	1622	ATG Entertainment	Harry Potter and the Cursed Child	Play	April 22, 2018	Open-ended
Majestic Theatre	W. 44th St. (No. 245)	1645	Shubert Organization	Purple Rain	Musical	April 12, 2027*	Open-ended
Marquis Theatre	W. 46th St. (No. 210)	1612	Nederlander Organization	Stranger Things: The First Shadow	Play	April 22, 2025	January 3, 2027*
Minskoff Theatre	W. 45th St. (No. 200)	1710	Nederlander Organization	The Lion King	Musical	November 13, 1997	Open-ended
Music Box Theatre	W. 45th St. (No. 239)	1009	Shubert Organization	Inter Alia	Play	December 1, 2026*	February 21, 2027
Nederlander Theatre	W. 41st St. (No. 208)	1235	Nederlander Organization	Schmigadoon!	Musical	April 20, 2026	April 4, 2027
Neil Simon Theatre	W. 52nd St. (No. 250)	1467	Nederlander Organization	MJ the Musical	Musical	February 1, 2022	Open-ended
New Amsterdam Theatre	W. 42nd St. (No. 214)	1747	Disney Theatrical Group	Aladdin	Musical	March 20, 2014	Open-ended
Palace Theatre	W. 47th St. (No. 160)	1648	Nederlander Organization	The Lost Boys	Musical	April 26, 2026	Open-ended
Richard Rodgers Theatre	W. 46th St. (No. 226)	1400	Nederlander Organization	Hamilton	Musical	August 6, 2015	Open-ended
St. James Theatre	W. 44th St. (No. 246)	1709	ATG Entertainment	Dolly: A True Original Musical	Musical	January 19, 2027*	Open-ended
Samuel J. Friedman Theatre	W. 47th St. (No. 261)	650	Manhattan Theatre Club	Awake and Sing!	Play	January 7, 2027*	February 7, 2027*
Shubert Theatre	W. 44th St. (No. 225)	1460	Shubert Organization	Galileo	Musical	December 6, 2026*	Open-ended
Stephen Sondheim Theatre	W. 43rd St. (No. 124)	1055	Roundabout Theatre Company	& Juliet	Musical	November 17, 2022	January 3, 2027*
Studio 54	W. 54th St. (No. 254)	1006	Roundabout Theatre Company	The Rocky Horror Show	Musical	April 23, 2026	May 30, 2027
Todd Haimes Theatre	W. 42nd St. (No. 227)	740	Roundabout Theatre Company	Mix and Master	Play	January 27, 2027*	February 28, 2027*
Vivian Beaumont Theater	W. 65th St. (No. 150)	1080	Lincoln Center Theatre	A Few Good Men	Play	October 29, 2026	January 10, 2027*
Walter Kerr Theatre	W. 48th St. (No. 219)	945	ATG Entertainment	Hadestown	Musical	April 17, 2019	Open-ended
Winter Garden Theatre	W. 50th St. & Broadway (No. 1634)	1526	Shubert Organization	Much Ado About Nothing	Play	November 19, 2026	January 10, 2027*

=== Upcoming productions ===
The following shows are confirmed as future Broadway productions. The theater in which they will run is either not yet known or currently occupied by another show.

Production	Type	Theater	Expected opening	Ref.
All My Sons	Play	August Wilson Theatre	April 13, 2027	
The Amish Project	Play	Broadhurst Theatre	March 10, 2027	
Annie	Musical	TBA	Fall 2027	
Birthright	Play	Hudson Theatre	March 15, 2027	
Cat on a Hot Tin Roof	Play	TBA	Spring 2027	
Damn Yankees	Musical	Marquis Theatre	April 20, 2027	
Dirty Dancing	Musical	Lena Horne Theatre	March 14, 2027	
Evita	Musical	Winter Garden Theatre	March 25, 2027	
The Full Monty	Musical	Todd Haimes Theatre	TBA	
Gloria	Play	Hayes Theater	April 5, 2027	
Lost Lear	Play	Booth Theatre	April 23, 2027	
Macbeth	Play	TBA	Spring 2027	
Montauk	Play	Samuel J. Friedman Theatre	April 19, 2027	
The Odd Couple	Play	Stephen Sondheim Theater	March 23, 2027	
Paddington: The Musical	Musical	Al Hirschfeld Theatre	April 18, 2027	
Rhinoceros	Play	Todd Haimes Theatre	April 25, 2027	
Small Mouth Sounds	Play	Ethel Barrymore Theatre	March 11, 2027	
The Sound of Music	Musical	Vivian Beaumont Theater	April 15, 2027	
This World of Tomorrow	Play	TBA	Fall 2027	
10 Things I Hate About You	Musical	TBA	August 2027	
Three Days of Rain	Play	Longacre Theatre	March 1, 2027	
Warriors	Musical	Lunt-Fontanne Theatre	April 8, 2027	
