= TKTS =

Theatre ticket booths

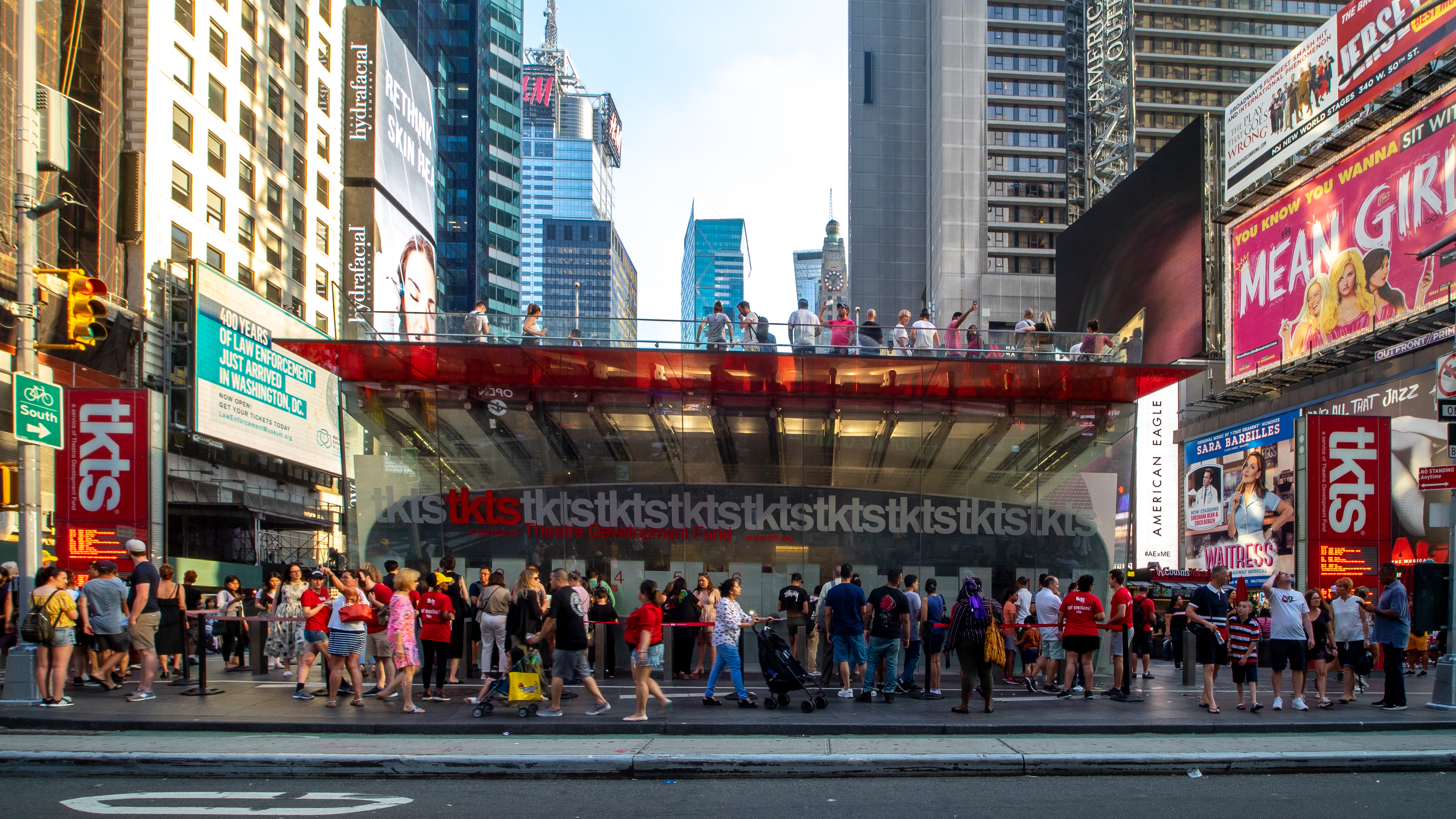
Ticket counters of the New York City booth as seen from 47th Street

The TKTS ticket booths in New York City and London sell Broadway and Off-Broadway shows and dance events and West End theatre tickets, respectively, at discounts of 20–50% off the face value. It is owned by the Theatre Development Fund, a non-profit.

== New York City ==
New York City's TKTS (which is pronounced phonetically as spelled-out "tee kay tee ess") first opened in 1973 and is operated by the Theatre Development Fund.

In 1974, the Fund opened a second booth, on William Street in Lower Manhattan. In 1983 it moved to the mezzanine of the South Tower of the World Trade Center. It opened earlier in the day than the Times Square location and usually had shorter lines. After the terrorist attack on September 11, 2001, brought down the twin towers, the booth moved to Bowling Green in Lower Manhattan and then to the South Street Seaport.

As of 2026 there are two locations: one in Duffy Square (at West 47th Street and Broadway, the north end of Times Square); and another at Lincoln Center for the Performing Arts in the David Rubenstein Atrium. The Downtown Brooklyn (Jay Street and Myrtle Avenue Promenade) TKTS opened in 2008 and closed in 2018. The South Street Seaport location did not reopen after closing during the 2020 Covid pandemic.

=== Main location ===
==== Pavilion ====
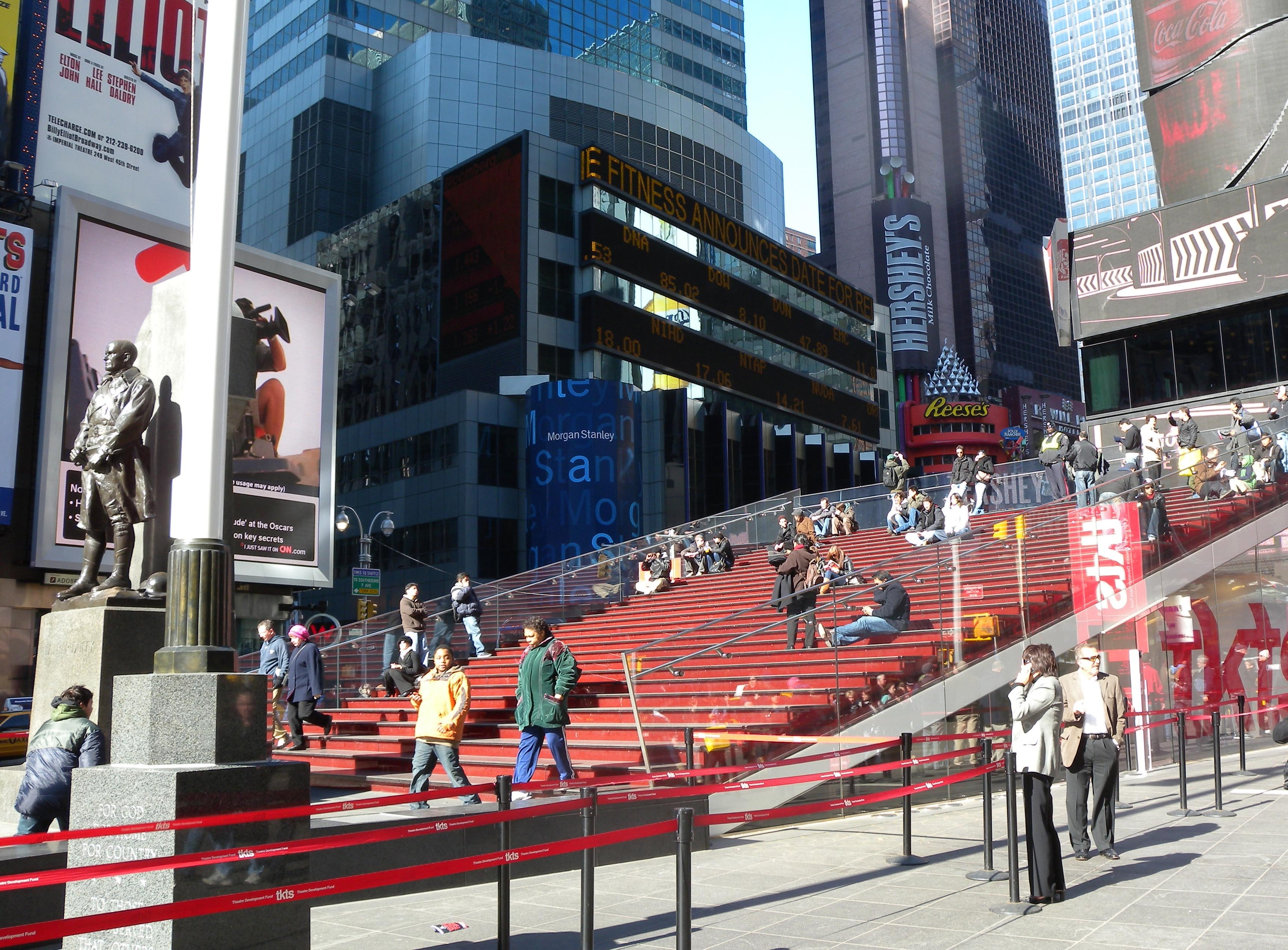
Bleacher seats on south (rear) side of Duffy Square booth

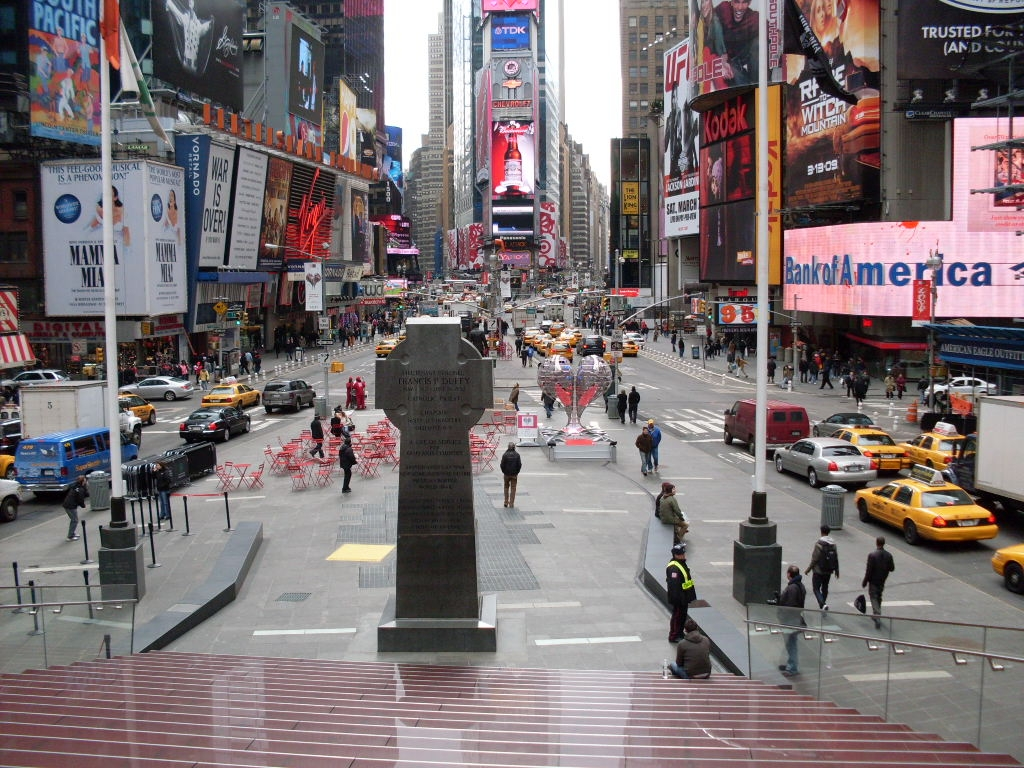
Times Square as seen from bleacher seats

The original TKTS pavilion in Times Square was designed by the Manhattan architecture firm of Mayers & Schiff Associates and was inaugurated by Mayor John Lindsay. The city had a capital budget of $5,000 to build the pavilion, a sum that was obviously insufficient. But the city did have an "operating" budget, which the architects used in a plan based on renting, rather than buying, the pavilion's parts. The sales booth was housed in a rented construction trailer; the armature around and on top of the trailer was made from rented scaffolding parts. Interwoven through the armature was a continuous white canvas ribbon emblazoned with the "TKTS" logo. Foundations could not be dug under the booth because the subway structure is just below ground level. To hold down this giant "wind kite" the architects utilized pile driving test weights (also rented). The pavilion received many design awards, including the American Institute of Graphic Arts' Excellence in Communications Graphics; The City Club of New York's Albert S. Bard Award for Architecture and Urban Design; and the N.Y. State Association of Architects Certificate of Merit for Design Excellence.

James Gatens ran the TKTS booth. Originally signing up for a 6-month job he ended up running it for 30 years until his retirement in 2003.

The new TKTS Booth and the redevelopment of Father Duffy Square was completed as a partnership between Theatre Development Fund, Times Square Alliance, and Father Duffy Coalition. The project began in 1999 with an international design competition sponsored the Van Alen Institute to re-design the popular TKTS Discount Booth. The competition's winner, Australian firm Choi Ropiha, reframed the challenge as a broader urban design response to invigorate and provide a center for Times Square. In 2001 Theatre Development Fund commissioned a feasibility study. New York City-based Perkins Eastman developed several approaches, and from those a final design, informed and inspired by the original concept, employed glass as the sole structural component for the steps and the TKTS Booth itself would be a free-standing structure within the glass enclosure. Completing the transformation of Father Duffy Square was the work of the plaza's architect, William Fellows of William Fellows Architects (and now with PKSB Architects). The transformation of the square allows for increased pedestrian traffic and more prominence for Father Duffy's commanding statue.

The new TKTS booth for the Times Square location began construction in May 2006 and was completed in October 2008. During this time, the TKTS booth was temporarily relocated to the nearby Marriott Marquis hotel. After many delays, the new TKTS booth opened for business on October 16, 2008, on a renovated Duffy Square, with a ceremony featuring Mayor Michael Bloomberg and various Broadway performers. The booth is wedge-shaped, with wide, bleacher-like stairs covering the roof, allowing pedestrians to sit down or climb the steps for a panoramic, unobstructed view of Times Square. According to the Theater Development Fund, the final cost of the new booth was $19 million.

==== Operations ====
In the 50 years since the booth first opened, there have been 68.6 million tickets sold. Theaters release tickets for sale by TKTS throughout the day, with more tickets often available within a few hours of showtime. TKTS accepts cash and credit cards. Waiting times at Duffy Square are normally longer than at Lincoln Center. Available shows are displayed on large signs near the ticket windows. The booth has twelve sales windows.

==== Awards and recognition ====
The TKTS booth in Times Square has won more than two dozen awards for design, lighting, and technical innovation including American Planning Association, William H. White Award; American Institute of Architects (AIA), Institute Honor Awards for Architecture; American Institute of Architects (AIA) New York State Chapter, Best in New York State; Travel + Leisure, Design Award: Best Public Space; and the Engineering Grand Award in Popular Science magazine's Best of "What's New 2009". At the time, it was the largest load-bearing glass structure in the world, designed by engineers at Dewhurst Macfarlane using a plastic film called SentryGlas Plus from DuPont.

=== Controversy over 50% off claims ===
The TKTS booth, its parent organization Theatre Development Fund (TDF), and Broadway show producers have been criticized for their claimed 50% off ticket prices. The prevailing belief is that TKTS offers 50% off of the normal sale price of a ticket, when in fact, those tickets are often subject to markups through dynamic pricing. As Broadway producer Ken Davenport states in multiple articles and seminars, dynamic pricing is applied in theaters to help a show get more money for a seat. There have also been several documented case studies where a ticket found at the theater at full price for $89 to Kinky Boots, which is a Ken Davenport production, were sold at the TKTS booth at "50% off" for $75 plus the $5 TDF Fee. The same case studies found similar incidents at Chicago, Phantom of the Opera, and Jersey Boys.

In an effort to help patrons make the most informed choices, TKTS began listing prices alongside discount percentages at all its booths in October 2018. The prices displayed include service charges, so patrons know the exact total per ticket. TKTS also started offering multiple price points that fall. As a nonprofit dedicated to expanding audiences and making theatre more affordable and accessible, TDF advocates within the Broadway community to secure the best prices for theatregoers who can't afford full-price tickets.

== London ==
London's TKTS, originally known as "The Half Price Ticket Booth", is run by the Society of London Theatre on behalf of the theatre industry. Operating since 1980 in Leicester Square, this discounted ticket booth was rebranded in 2001 and offers customers a wide choice of discount theatre tickets on the day of the performance and in advance. There are also full price tickets regularly available through the booth.

Tickets can only be bought from TKTS in person. Each TKTS ticket includes a booking fee of £3 on discount theatre tickets and £1 on full price tickets. All profits made from SOLT, including TKTS, go straight back into the industry. TKTS is also accredited by the Society of Ticket Agents and Retailers (STAR) and all ticket sales are made following the STAR code of practice.

The Society of London Theatre has licensed the TKTS trademark from the Theatre Development Fund, but the two organizations are otherwise unrelated.

== Other locations ==
There are TKTS booths in Tokyo (opened August 2019) and Philadelphia (opened November 2024) that, like London, license the TKTS trademark.
