= Theatre Development Fund =

Non-profit corporation assisting the theatre industry in New York City

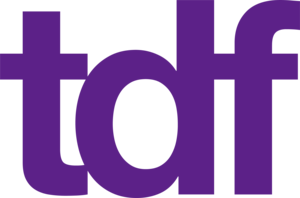
- Abbreviation: TDF
- Formation: 1968
- Type: Nonprofit
- Purpose: Promotion of theatre/dance and its development, especially in New York City
- Location: New York City, United States
- Services: Disability services, among others
- Methods: Use of private and government funding
- Award: Special Tony Award
- Website: tdf.org

The Theatre Development Fund (TDF) is a not-for-profit performing arts service organization in New York City. Created in 1968 to help an ailing New York theatre industry, TDF supports audiences and artists through a variety of programs. Initially, TDF supported performances it deemed to be of cultural value on Broadway and beyond through its subsidy program. While this program was discontinued, TDF continues to support Broadway, Off-Broadway, and Off-off-broadway theatre and dance productions by selling tickets through multiple programs, the most prominent being its TKTS discount ticket booths. The organization also assists Broadway with complying with the Americans with Disabilities Act of 1990 (ADA), provides educational outreach programs to secondary and college students, and rents out costumes to productions and other non-profits. It has received a Special Tony Award for its work.

== History ==
TDF was founded in 1968 in order to originally provide assistance to Broadway productions that were viewed as not likely to survive without some financial assistance, but would likely have some significant cultural impact. This came in the wake of productions on Broadway seemingly becoming more and more formulaic. The original goal of the organization was thus to buy up tickets of those plays and give them away for free. It was founded by Anna E. Crouse, John E. Booth and August Heckscher, with Harold Clurman vetting the works supported. Hugh Southern was the first executive director. The organization first bought 1,112 seats to The Great White Hope and gave them away to students for free using grant money from the Rockefeller Foundation.

After this first initiative was successful, the organization launched its TDF membership program in 1971, selling deeply discounted tickets to audiences who were eligible to join, such as teachers, students and retirees. Subsequently, TDF set up the TKTS booth in Duffy Square in 1973 to sell even more discount tickets without the barrier of membership. TDF has two TKTS discount ticket booths in New York City, the original in Times Square and another at Lincoln Center. There are booths in Philadelphia, London and Tokyo that license the TKTS trademark, but the organizations are otherwise unrelated.

Starting in 1972, TDF added Off-off-Broadway productions to its offerings. At the time, vouchers cost 80 cents for audiences and entitled producers to $2.50. In 1974, TDF sold over 40,000 vouchers and estimated that 300,000 people were supported by the program, which resulted in recognition from industry groups. Today, TDF continues to offer Off-off-Broadway tickets through its membership programs.

In 1974, TDF Costume Collection opened, renting costumes to nonprofit and commercial productions. As of January 2025, TDF Costume Collection houses over 100,000 costumes and accessories providing professionally designed costumes to not-for-profit organizations at affordable prices.

In 1979, TDF created TDF Accessibility Programs (TAP), which offers services to theatergoers with disabilities. The first service that was provided to deaf people was a live ASL translation of the performance of The Elephant Man in 1980. Since the implementation of the Americans with Disabilities Act it has expanded its programs for disabled people by assisting theatres in their compliance of the law. This includes offering open captioning, discounted seats that are closer to the stage, as well as live description of the performance (introduced in 2008) to the deaf and blind respectively. In 2011, the program also started providing services to adults and children on the autistic spectrum by providing autism friendly performances.

In 1995, TDF began to offer theatrical educational programs and opportunities in the community. They offer an introduction class for theatre called "Introduction to Theatre", which is offered to about 10,000 high school students in New York City. Students receive eight workshops provided by TDF and are offered a trip to see a Broadway or Off-Broadway production. In 1997, TDF introduced the Wendy Wasserstein/Open Doors program, which provides select students interested in theatre the chance to see a variety of plays over the course of a year with "accomplished theatre professionals" and discuss them afterwards. In 2012, the program won a Tony Honor for Excellence in Theatre, from the Tony Awards.

== Current programs ==
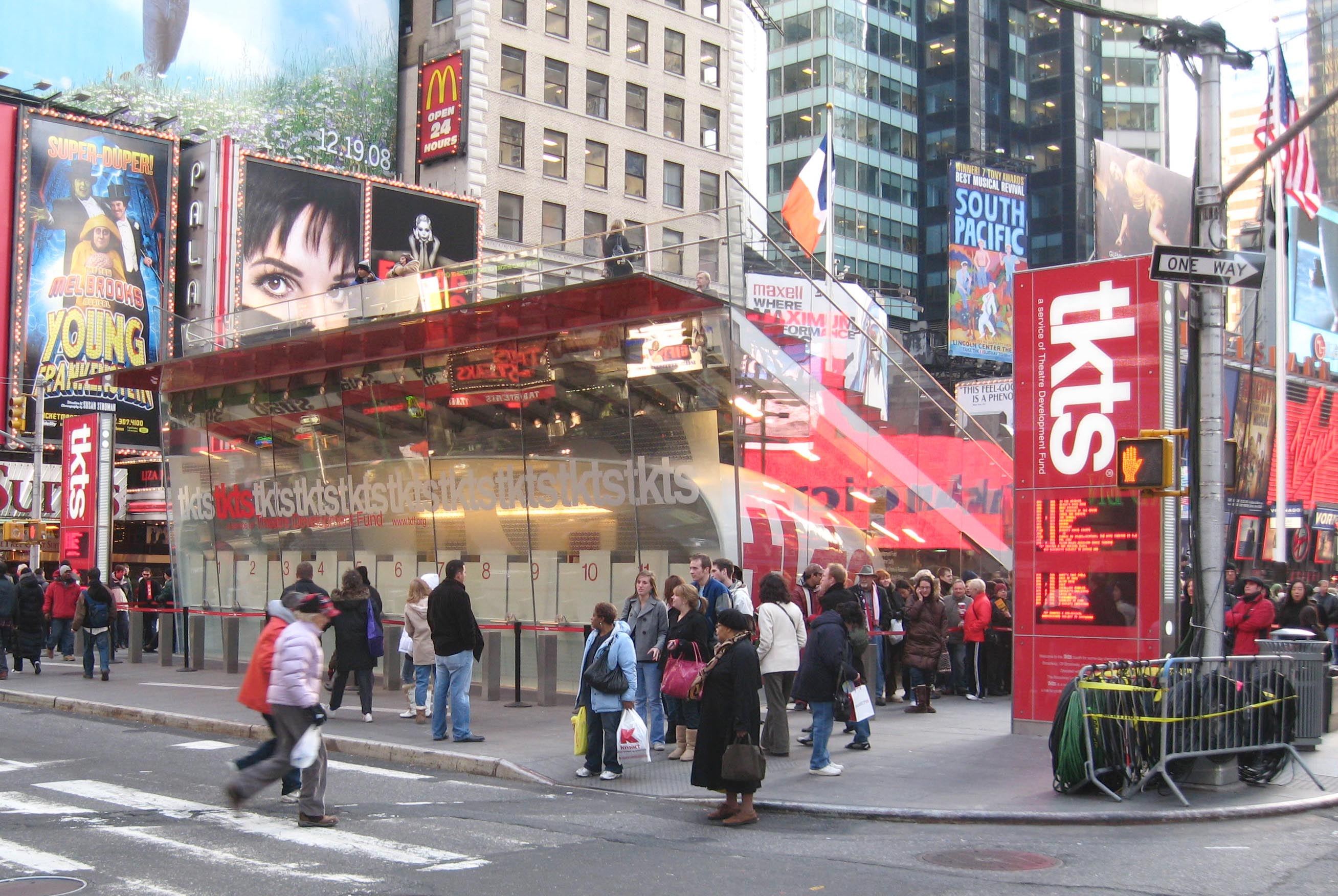
TKTS Times Square

The current programs of the fund thus include:

- TDF memberships
- TDF Accessibility Programs
- Educational programs for secondary and college students and aspiring playwrights
- Costume leasing
- Awards for costume design

== Criticism ==
Most of the criticism the organization receives has to do with a broader debate on whether Broadway needs subsidization. This is due to the fact that the organization sometimes uses federal grant money in order to subsidize Broadway, which some question as a good use of taxpayer money (especially since doing so constitutes a bailout of a commercial enterprise). The TKTS booth itself also receives unrelated criticism because of its marketing tactics, specifically over its claims of whether the tickets it sells are in fact sold at a 50% discount.
