= Jane Stewart (executive) =

American public relations executive (1917–1990)

- Born: July 2, 1917; Pitcairn, Pennsylvania, U.S.
- Died: September 7, 1990 (aged 73); Litchfield Park, Arizona, U.S.
- Education: Ohio Wesleyan University
- Occupation: Public relations executive
- Spouse: John Mapes (m. 1968; died 1989)

Anna Jane Stewart (July 2, 1917 – September 7, 1990), also called Jane Stewart Mapes in the press, was an American public relations executive. She was among the first female executives in her field. She was vice president and then president of Group Attitudes Corporation, a subsidiary of Hill and Knowlton in 1961. She was named by Printers' Ink in 1966 as one of America's 40 top women in executive positions in communications and marketing.

== Background ==
Anna Jane Stewart was born in Pitcairn, Pennsylvania, on July 2, 1917. According to interviewee Barbara Walkley, with whom Jane Stewart had shared a workplace, Stewart was "not very tall; she had medium blonde or sandy brown hair, very nice eyes, a small to medium build" . . . "a presence; you had to look twice." Aside from the names of her family members, mother, Froan (Seibert) Stewart; father, Lawrence R. Stewart; and sister, Ruth, not much is known about her childhood. At some point her family moved to Floral Park, New York.

Stewart attended Randolph Macon—a women's college in Lynchburg, Virginia—then transferred to Ohio Wesleyan University to study history and education, where she graduated with a bachelor's degree in 1939. During this time, she was involved in history and sociology clubs in addition to the Y.W.C.A and being a member of a sorority. She gave back to her school through monetary contributions and served on the board of directors during the mid 1960s. She also served on the public relations committees of many organizations including the New York State Salvation Army and the American Foundation for Religion and Psychiatry.

She retired in 1968 at the age of 51 and married John Mapes the same year. The pair moved to a quaint Phoenix suburb, Litchfield Park, where Stewart regularly volunteered with nonprofit organizations, including the library board. There is no clear documentation on her religious beliefs but she was an active member of the Dutch Reformed Church in New York.

Following years of struggle with amyotrophic lateral sclerosis (ALS), Stewart died by suicide in Litchfield Park, Arizona on September 7, 1990.

== Public Relations career ==
After graduating, Stewart spent five years as an assistant for press relations at Long Island Rail Road. In 1945 she left and became John W. Hill’s secretary at Hill and Knowlton. After five years at H&K, she left with top executive John G. Mapes and founded Group Attitudes Corp. in 1950. Stewart is described as being ambitious and thus a risky career move such as the switch to Group Attitudes was reflective of her personality. They joined Hill & Knowlton when Group Attitudes was acquired in 1956, but the group continued to operate within the walls of H&K. They even had some exclusive clients, including Hill and Knowlton's steel account.

Group Attitudes was known as a PR research firm, and in this aspect of Public Relations, Stewart excelled. She handled surveys and conducted large scale research in order to gain insight. She was a part of a comprehensive study conducted for the State Education Department of New York. In particular, she recognized the "importance and value of women" even in the "most patriarchal of industries:" the steel industry. While conducting research for Group Attitudes, Stewart discovered that the opinion of wives–the often "stay-at-home financial managers–mattered when swaying the opinion of male steel workers.

She led with a collaborative management style, which allowed for a women's role in the process of opinion management to be included. Although Jane Stewart did not target women exclusively with her work, she nevertheless found a way to elevate the status of women in a household but also professionally.

== Notable Contributions ==
Jane Stewart is notable for being a female pioneer in public relations. She excelled among men and headed a company as president, which was exceptionally rare for a woman during this time. Despite her patriarchal environment, Stewart never faltered in her femininity. She was fashionable, poised, and unapologetically female, but still spoke to men as equals and insisted that she be held to the same standards as men. She helped open the agency to other women executives, and according to Barbara Walkley, a female employee of H&K, she was "a role model...because of her manner."

Her photograph appeared in a Public Relations Journal article written by John W. Hill. She was invited to speak at the American Iron and Steel Institute annual meeting and at Barnard College, a women's college.

== Legacy ==
By her colleagues, Anna Jane Stewart is remembered as ambitious and pioneering. By history, she is often overlooked. Stewart was a professional in a male-dominated field and executed her responsibilities, paving the way for women not only in the field of public relations, but in professional settings overall.

Carl Lewis, who knew her as a fellow employee of H&K said, "She was one of the best, and of the earliest regardless of gender, in public relations attitude research."
