= John Mapes =

American public relations executive (1906–1989)

- Born: John G. Mapes; May 6, 1906; Ohio, U.S.
- Died: March 23, 1989 (aged 82); Phoenix, Arizona, U.S.
- Occupation: Public relations executive
- Spouse(s): Dorothy Gwyneth Glynn (divorced); Jane Stewart

John G. Mapes (May 6, 1906 – March 23, 1989) was an American public relations executive. He served as vice chairman of Hill & Knowlton from 1965 to 1967. Founder John W. Hill considered Mapes a protege and "more than anything else . . . a relative."

== Life and career ==
Mapes was born in Ohio. He joined Hill & Knowlton in 1934, becoming executive vice president in 1947. After he divorced his first wife, Dorothy Gwyneth Glynn, Mapes and his second wife Jane Stewart founded Group Attitudes Corp. in 1950. Hill & Knowlton acquired Group Attitudes in 1956. Mapes died of pneumonia in a Phoenix, Arizona nursing home.

Mapes was the writer of the 1953 book Men and Unions.
