= Socony-Mobil Building =

Office skyscraper in Manhattan, New York

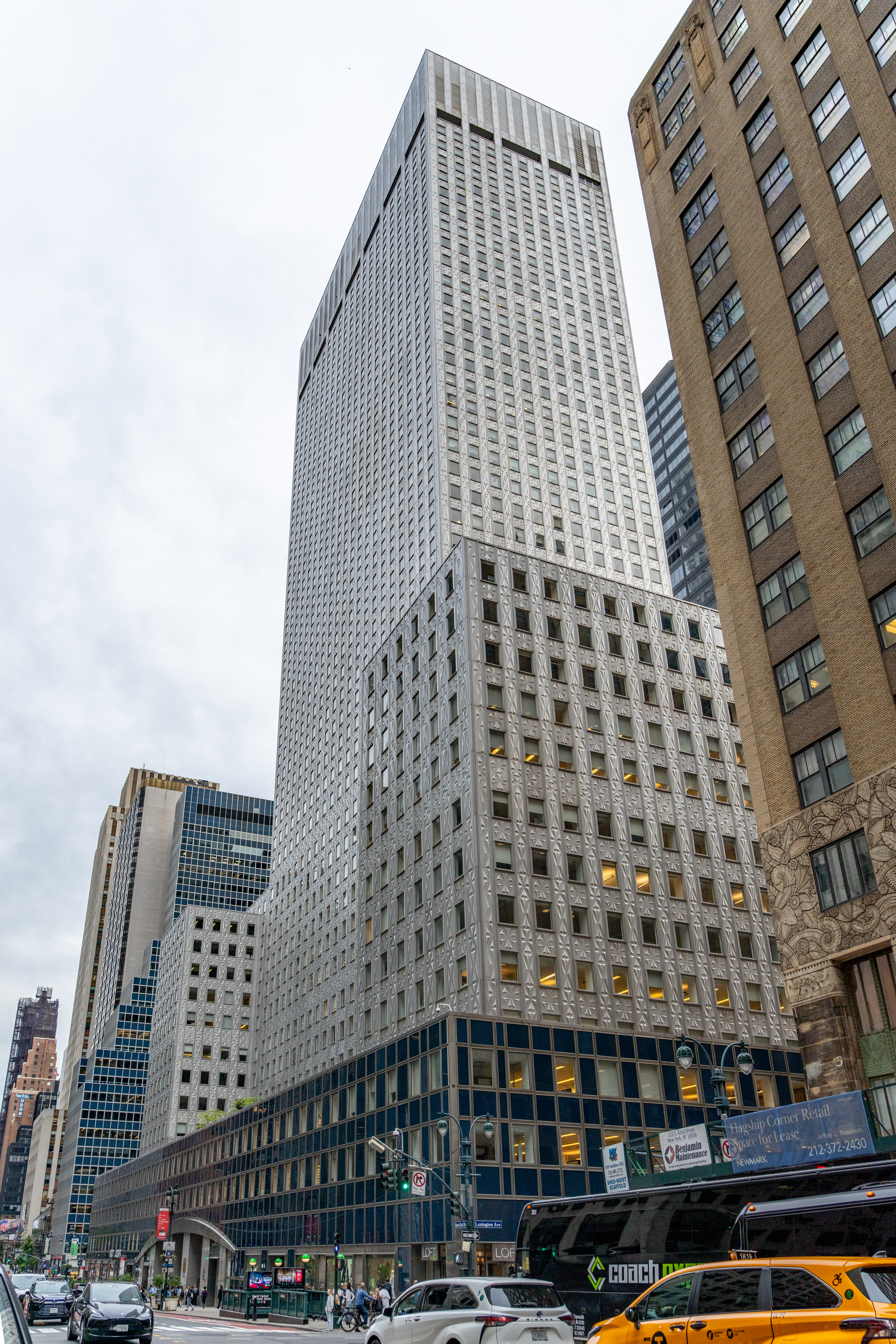
- (2025)

General information
- Type: Office
- Architectural style: International and Moderne Style
- Location: 150 East 42nd Street; New York, NY 10017; U.S.
- Coordinates: 40°45′03″N 73°58′32″W
- Construction started: 1954
- Completed: 1956
- Operator: JLL

Height
- Antenna spire: 572 ft (174 m)
- Roof: 572 ft (174 m)

Technical details
- Floor count: 45 (Note: Excluding the ground-floor basement on Third Avenue)
- Floor area: 1,800,000 sq ft (170,000 m^{2})

Design and construction
- Architects: Harrison & Abramovitz, John B. Peterkin
- Developer: Peter B. Ruffin (Galbreath Corporation)
- Structural engineer: Edwards & Hjorth
- Main contractor: Turner Construction

New York City Landmark
- Designated: February 25, 2003
- Reference no.: 2117

The Socony-Mobil Building, also known as 150 East 42nd Street, is a 45-story, 572-foot-tall (174 m) skyscraper in the Murray Hill and East Midtown neighborhoods of Manhattan in New York City. It occupies the block bounded by 41st Street, 42nd Street, Lexington Avenue, and Third Avenue.

The Socony-Mobil Building contains a three-story base with a primary entrance on 42nd Street, a secondary entrance on Lexington Avenue, and a basement that is visible along Third Avenue. Above the base is a 42-story tower that brings the structure to its maximum height; this is flanked to the west and east by wings that rise to the 13th story. The stories above the base are completely clad with stainless steel, comprising 7,000 panels. The structure was designed in two sections. The consultant John B. Peterkin designed the original plans to comply with the 1916 Zoning Resolution, while architects Harrison & Abramovitz became involved in 1952 and redesigned the structure in the International and Moderne styles.

The Socony-Mobil Building was constructed between 1954 and 1956 as a speculative development by Peter B. Ruffin, who acquired a long-term lease from the site's owners, the Goelet family. Ruffin persuaded several tenants to move into 150 East 42nd Street, including the Socony-Mobil oil company, which occupied half the building upon its completion. The Socony-Mobil Building was renamed the Mobil Building in 1966 and was sold to Hiro Real Estate Company in 1987. After a series of renovations in the 1990s, it was sold to real estate investor David Werner in 2014. The building was designated a New York City landmark in 2003.

== Site ==
The Socony-Mobil Building is in the Murray Hill and East Midtown neighborhoods of Manhattan, New York City, occupying a full city block bounded by 42nd Street to the north, Third Avenue to the east, 41st Street to the south, and Lexington Avenue to the west. It is less than a block east of Grand Central Terminal. The Chrysler Building is across 42nd Street while the Chanin Building is across Lexington Avenue. Other nearby buildings include the Grand Hyatt New York to the northwest, as well as 110 East 42nd Street and the Pershing Square Building west of the Chanin Building. The site occupies 83,000 square feet (7,700 m^{2}).

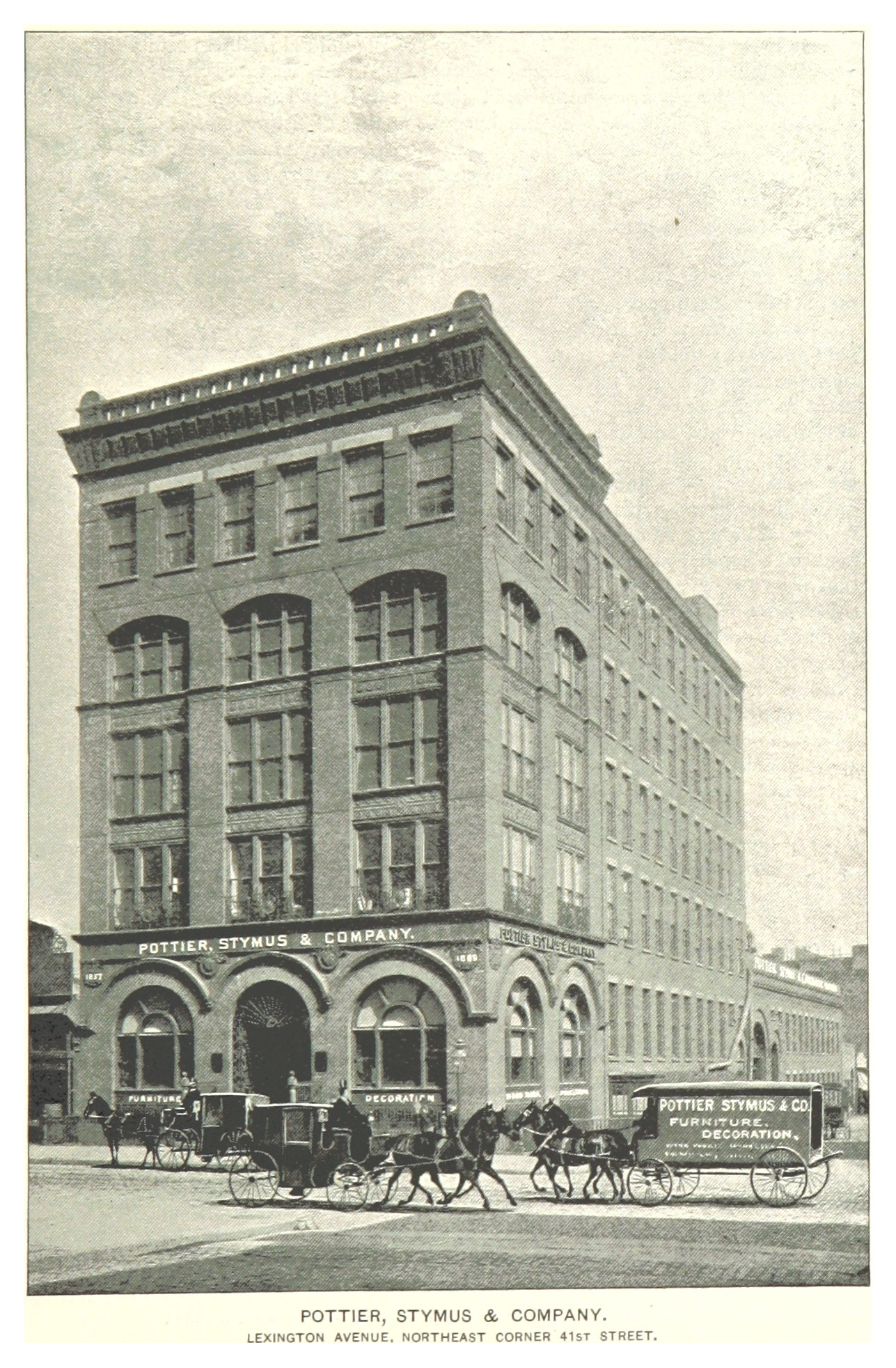
Pottier & Stymus factory building, which formerly occupied the Socony-Mobil Building site

The site of the Socony-Mobil Building was initially owned by the Goelet family, namely Robert Goelet Sr. (1809–1879) and Peter Goelet (1800–1879), co-founders of the Chemical Bank. The Goelet brothers began acquiring land on the current Socony-Mobil Building site in 1848, close to the intersection of Lexington Avenue and 42nd Street on the block's northwest corner, then leased the land. The largest lessee, furniture-design company Pottier & Stymus, built a six-story brick factory/showroom building on the site that burned down in 1888 and was rebuilt by the Goelets. The block also contained numerous hotels, a garage, and two theaters. An entrance to the New York City Subway's Grand Central–42nd Street station was built within a structure on 42nd Street after 1915. The subway entrance is owned by the New York City Transit Authority and consists of two escalators, a maintenance room, and a heating plant. It was the only preexisting structure to be preserved in the Socony-Mobil Building.

The completion of the underground Grand Central Terminal in 1913 resulted in the rapid development of the areas around Grand Central and a corresponding increase in real-estate prices. An elevated railroad line, running above 42nd Street to the Grand Central station, was closed in 1923, leading to the development of such structures as the Chanin Building and 110 East 42nd Street to the west of Lexington Avenue. However, the neighborhood east of Lexington Avenue continued to be made up of mostly low-rise buildings; (Note: The major exceptions were the Chrysler Building, located across 42nd Street to the north, and the Daily News Building, located at 42nd Street and Second Avenue.) these blocks were adjacent to the Second Avenue and Third Avenue elevated lines and so these areas were initially considered unattractive for major development. With the 1942 closure and demolition of the Second Avenue line, the Goelets purchased more lots at Third Avenue and 41st Street, accurately foreseeing that the Third Avenue elevated would eventually be closed and the area would be redeveloped.

== Architecture ==
The Socony-Mobil Building was designed by architects Harrison & Abramovitz in the International and Moderne Styles. The structure comprises 45 stories in total, with a roof height of 572 feet (174 m). The base is composed of three stories and occupies the whole block. Because the topography descends from Lexington Avenue to Third Avenue, the basement story is visible along Third Avenue, making that side four stories tall. The 42-story upper section is centrally located within the block and is flanked by thirteen-story wings to the east and west, giving the upper stories an H-shaped layout. The building has capacity for over 8,000 office workers.

=== Facade ===
The facade is made of two sections: a base with a tinted-glass facade and an upper section with a metal facade. Both materials are used in Harrison & Abramovitz's other works, as well as other structures in New York City. (Note: Harrison & Abramovitz had first used a glass facade design on the wall panels of Rockefeller Center's shopping concourse. They went on to use similar designs in Springs Mills Building, the United Nations Secretariat Building, the Lever House, and the Corning Glass Building. The steel-facade design was used in Pittsburgh's Regional Enterprise Tower, designed by Harrison & Abramovitz; other firms in New York City designed their buildings with steel panels as well, including National Distiller's Building at 99 Park Avenue, as well as 666 Fifth Avenue and the Fashion Institute of Technology's Administration and Technology Building. The Inland Steel Building in Chicago, designed by Skidmore, Owings & Merrill in 1956–1957, also used steel panels extensively.) In addition, the Socony-Mobil Building includes 3,200 vertically pivoting single-pane windows. These windows could withstand wind gusts of up to 145 miles per hour (233 km/h).

==== Base ====
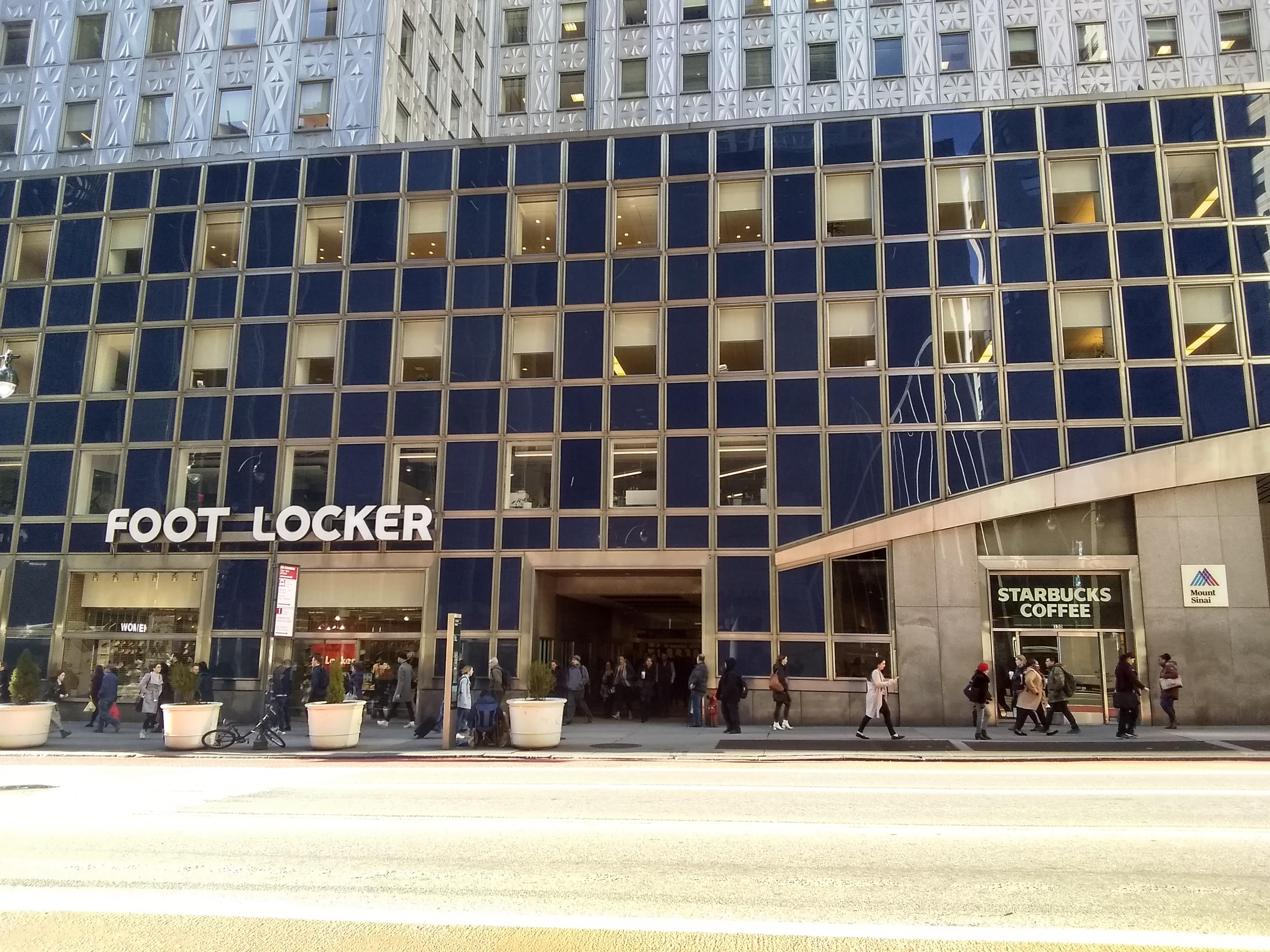
The 42nd Street facade, with the subway entrance shown in the middle

The base is four stories tall and occupies the entire block. The facade of the base is composed mostly of dark-blue, opaque tinted glass windows, with slightly projecting moldings made of stainless steel; this contrasts with the adjacent buildings, which are primarily clad with terracotta. At 42nd Street and Lexington Avenue, there are large metallic entrance archways at the center of the base. There are ground-floor storefronts at all corners of the building, except at the southwest corner. An entrance to the New York City Subway's Grand Central–42nd Street station, leading to the platform for the 7 and <7> trains, is within the building east of the 42nd Street archway.

==== Upper section ====
The facade of the upper 42 stories consists of approximately 750,000 pounds (340,000 kg) of 0.038-inch (0.97 mm) thick pleated chromium nickel panels, described as being 20-gauge "Type 302" stainless steel. There are 7,000 panels, embossed with pyramidal forms in high relief, on the building. These panels can be grouped into four types: singular rosettes vertically adjacent to the windows; pairings of large and small rosettes beside the windows; and two types of interlocking pyramidal forms. The panels were designed so that rain could be washed away easily. To ensure the patterns would be created to the correct specifications, the architects made full-sized plaster models and hired metal-die workers.

Harrison & Abramovitz had briefly considered using aluminum, but because of developers Peter B. Ruffin and John W. Galbreath's connections to the steel industry, the architects instead decided to clad the facade in steel. According to architectural historian Christopher Gray, "By using steel panels on the 1.6 million square foot [150,000 m^{2}] building, the team gained several inches of floor space on the inside wall, greatly reduced labor costs on the skin, and saved weight—the panels weighed two pounds per square foot [9.8 kg/m^{2}] as opposed to 48 pounds per square foot [230 kg/m^{2}] for brick". It continues to be among the world's largest stainless-steel-clad skyscrapers.

=== Interior ===
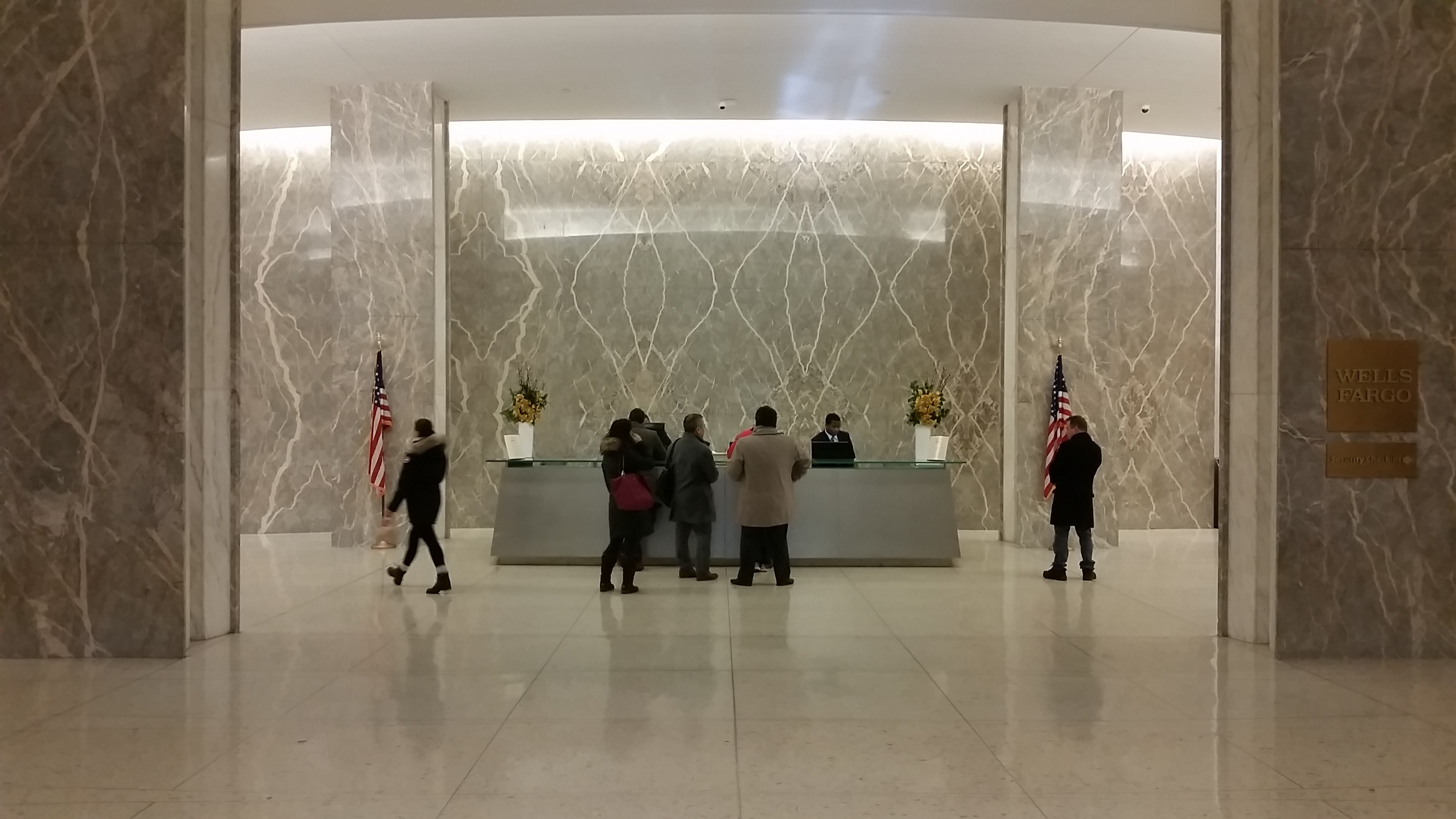
The building's lobby

The structure contains about 1.8 million square feet (170,000 m^{2}) in total interior space. Stainless steel was used in the lobby and for the elevator doors. The panels were press-formed into a trihedral pattern to prevent waviness and to break up reflections. Near the top of the building are three mechanical floors. At the time of the Socony-Mobil Building's completion, the 75,000 square feet (7,000 m^{2}) on the square floor represented the single largest concentration of enclosed office space on a single floor in New York City.

A 215-foot-long (66 m) passageway under Lexington Avenue and 42nd Street was completed along with the building in 1955, connecting the basement to the rest of the Grand Central–42nd Street subway complex. Originating inside the basement of the Socony-Mobil Building, the passage curved northwest and then west under 42nd Street to the mezzanine of the subway station. The passageway was closed prior to 1991. The tunnel was reopened in the late 2010s as part of the complex's renovation, and new sidewalk staircases were built at the southeastern corner of 42nd Street and Lexington Avenue.

== History ==
=== Planning and construction ===
Developers John W. Galbreath and Peter B. Ruffin convinced the Goelet estate, the previous owners of the site, to erect an office building on their land at Lexington Avenue and 42nd Street. Subsequently, in 1942, the Goelets hired John B. Peterkin as a consultant. Peterkin published his first plan for an office building in the early 1940s. Based on proposals for Rockefeller Center, it called for a brick-clad office tower over an airport-bus terminal at ground level. At the time, structures with metal facades were not common and would not become a trend until the end of World War II. The plan did not progress because of doubts over how the large site would be developed, as well as the challenges in securing the long-term leases that the Goelets wanted.

The plans were then brought up by Ruffin, head of Galbreath's Galbreath Corporation, which was headquartered nearby. At the time, the Goelet estate "wanted the property improved but not exploited". Ruffin and Galbreath hired Harrison & Abramovitz to design the building in 1952. The developers convinced Mobil (at the time known as Socony-Vacuum) to be the anchor tenant, leasing nearly half of the structure. Socony-Vacuum would relocate from a headquarters at 26 Broadway in Lower Manhattan. Construction of a 42-story skyscraper was officially announced in 1953, and the developers decided to call the structure the Socony-Vacuum Building. At the time of the announcement, the site was still occupied by Volk's, a German bar on Third Avenue; the five-story Pershing Square Hotel on 42nd Street; a six-story loft next to the hotel; and numerous one-story structures with stores.

After the Mobil deal was finalized, the Equitable Life Assurance Society of the United States and the National City Bank of New York collectively loaned $37.5 million for the project. In planning the building's exterior, Harrison and Abramovitz collaborated with Ruffin and Galbreath to devise a design. In 1953 and 1954, the original plans for a brick-faced structure were changed to that for a structure with embossed steel panels, even though at the time, steel was more expensive than brick. Ruffin and Galbreath had connections to U.S. Steel, which offered to cover the cost difference of steel, and because such a design would show off the potential uses of steel on buildings. Prior to the decision to use steel, Harrison & Abramovitz had briefly considered using aluminum. German architect Oscar Nitzchke, of Harrison & Abramovitz's office, may have been involved in designing the steel panels, though the extent of his involvement is unclear. For the steel panels, over 100 designs were said to have been reviewed.

Harrison & Abramovitz hired Turner Construction as general contractors and Edwards & Hjorth as structural engineers. A groundbreaking ceremony for 150 East 42nd Street was held on March 31, 1954. Girder construction started in November 1954 and was completed by the following July. The installation of steel panels then started in May 1955 and completed that December. Though the builders later claimed that "no accidents" had occurred during construction, there was an incident in August 1955 in which the scaffolding sagged, forcing an evacuation of nearby blocks.

=== Opening and early years ===
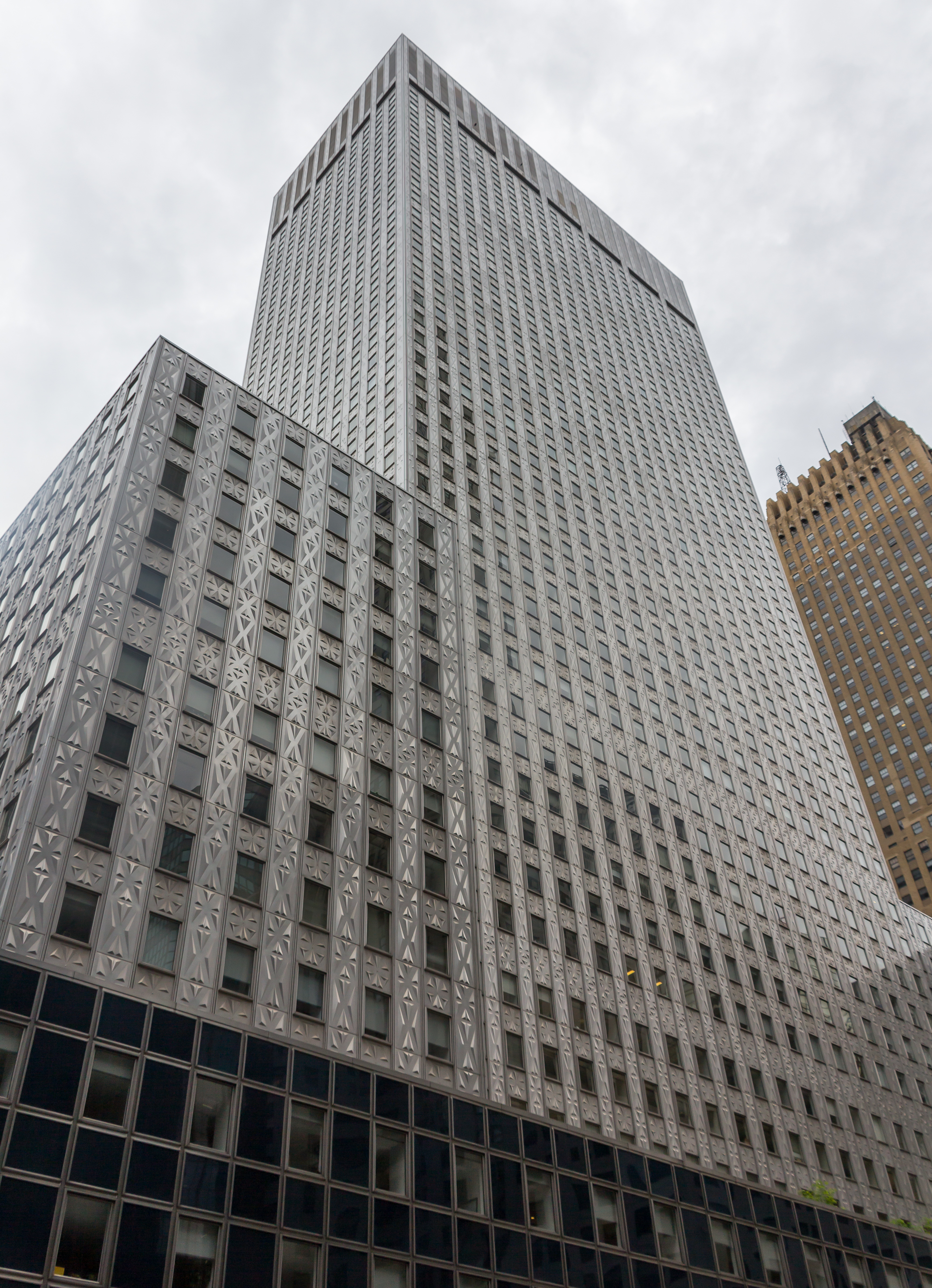
Viewed from Third Avenue looking southwest; the Chanin Building is in the background to the right

The first tenants started moving into the building in April 1956, and the structure was declared finished on October 3, 1956. The opening ceremony occurred two weeks later, on October 17, with a cornerstone-laying ceremony attended by the leaders of several large tenants. These leaders made predictions of "scientific commonplaces" within the next hundred years, and they placed their predictions within the cornerstone. At the time of its completion, the Socony-Mobil Building was the first skyscraper to have its exterior wall entirely clad with stainless steel, as well as being the largest air-conditioned building in the world.

Ruffin, the Socony-Mobil Building's owner, had been placed in charge of leasing the office space. Though the building was a speculative development, it was successful: The space had been completely leased by February 1955, leading Ruffin to say that it was the first time he had seen a building fully leased "before [it] was even near completion". Numerous companies had followed Socony-Mobil's example of moving from Lower Manhattan to Midtown Manhattan, though many corporations were moving to the suburbs at the time.

At opening, Mobil had 2,500 employees working on the floors that they occupied. Another early tenant was the building's own contractor, Turner Construction, whose occupancy was described as an "ultimate compliment" to the Socony-Mobil Building's design. Other tenants included American Express Company, F. W. Woolworth Company, and First National City Bank at the base, as well as Air Reduction Company, International General Electric Company, American Tobacco Company, Hill & Knowlton, and St. Regis Paper Company on the upper floors. Shortly after the Socony-Mobil Building's opening, the Pinnacle Club of New York was established near the top stories as a corporate club; it rivaled the Chrysler Building's Cloud Club. Architectural historian Robert A. M. Stern wrote that the development of the Socony-Mobil Building represented the gradual move of office tenants from lower to midtown Manhattan.

=== Later use ===
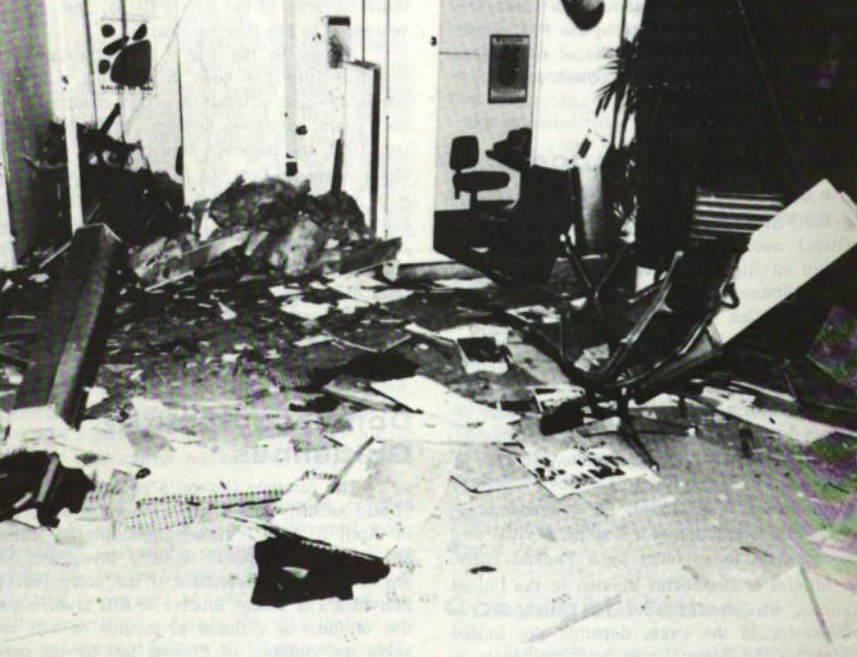
Aftermath of 1977 bombing

When the Socony-Mobil Company became the Mobil Oil Corporation in 1966, its headquarters was renamed the Mobil Building. The structure was the subject of several bomb attacks by the Fuerzas Armadas de Liberación Nacional Puertorriqueña (FALN) in the 1970s. One such attack in 1970 targeted numerous office buildings in the area. Another bomb, in 1977, killed an office worker in the building. At the time of the 1970 attack, The New York Times stated that the Mobil Building was owned by the Connecticut General Life Insurance Company. Because of an increase in crime in the 1980s, as well as the fact that the Mobil Building was largely occupied by a single tenant, a security desk was installed in the lobby, which required that all visitors and employees sign in prior to entering the building.

In 1987, the building was sold to the Japanese firm Hiro Real Estate Company in a transaction estimated to be worth $200 million. That April, Mobil announced the beginning of a three-year relocation of its headquarters to Fairfax, Virginia. Even though neighboring buildings generally had over 80 percent occupancy, the combination of the Mobil exodus and the early 1990s recession caused the building's occupancy rate to decrease to 15 percent.

The Socony-Mobil Building was renovated in 1995, during which it was cleaned for the first time, and the elevators, mechanical systems, lobby, and concierge desk were restored. By that year, occupancy had increased to 25 percent. Several major tenants, including HypoVereinsbank, Pfizer, Gruner + Jahr, and American Airlines, rented space in the building, bringing the building to 70 percent occupancy by 1996. The building was 89 percent occupied by 1997. Hiro also extended the ground lease from 2013 to 2028 to show its long-term commitment; previously, companies had hesitated at moving into the building because the short term of the ground lease had indicated an uncertain future for the building.

Hiro acquired a long-term lease from the Goelet estate in 2001 and began renovating the structure for $15 million. Around the same time, the New York City Landmarks Preservation Commission began considering the structure for official landmark status. Lawyers for Hiro objected, saying, "We don't believe the case [for landmark status] has been successfully made." In 2003, the Socony-Mobil Building was designated as an official landmark despite these objections. Financial firm Wells Fargo leased some space in 2011 for its New York City headquarters.

Hiro placed the building on the market in March 2014; the next month, real estate investor David Werner entered a contract to purchase the building for $900 million. Meridian Capital Group and Eastdil financed Werner's purchase by borrowing $700 million, including a $175 million mezzanine loan and $525 million in commercial mortgage-backed securities (CMBS). By the 2010s, the building's tenants included Dentsu Aegis Network, as well as Mount Sinai Health System on multiple floors. The building was 89 percent occupied by December 2024, though its largest tenant at the time, Wells Fargo, was planning to relocate many of its workers to the Shops at Hudson Yards. In early 2025, Werner extended the Socony-Mobil Building's CMBS loan by three years, and RXR Realty took over as the property manager.

== Reception ==
The Socony-Mobil Building's design received mixed criticism. A contemporary Architectural Forum article said that much of the controversy revolved around the facade: "some dislike it because it reminds them of the metal ceiling of an old store. Others like it because it reminds them of an old store. Some who disliked it to begin with are now pleased with the sparkle. Some like it less now that the building is finished." Architectural critic Lewis Mumford was among the detractors: He described the facade as "a disaster" and said that "From the street, this new building looks as if it were coming down with measles." Similarly, critic Henry Hope Reed Jr. stated that "technical triumphs make for nothing but greater ugliness", while writer John Tauranac stated that "its design is uninspired".

The building also received praise for its design. A writer for The New York Times stated that "the curtain-wall or shell type of construction around skyscrapers has brought the metallic look to the skyline". In its 2003 designation report, the Landmarks Preservation Commission described the building as "one of New York's most striking skyscrapers".

== See also ==
- List of New York City Designated Landmarks in Manhattan from 14th to 59th Streets
