= Jack Martin (executive) =

American entrepreneur and rancher

- Born: c. 1954 (age 70–71); Taylor, Texas, United States
- Occupation(s): Entrepreneur, businessman, and rancher
- Known for: Founder of former CEO of Hill+Knowlton Strategies and public relations expert
- Spouse: Patsy Woods Martin

Jack Martin is an entrepreneur, businessman, and rancher. He previously served as the global executive chairman and chief executive officer of Hill+Knowlton Strategies, a global public relations consultancy, and as a Democratic consultant.

Martin is a former chairman of the Texas State University System Board of Regents and has served on the LBJ Foundation's board of trustees. The foundation supports the LBJ Presidential Library and LBJ School of Public Affairs. Jack Martin also served as the Chairman of the Board of Trustees for Baylor Scott and White hospital system. Martin is also a member of the Texas Business Hall of Fame.

== Early life ==
Jack Martin was born in Taylor, Texas and grew up in San Antonio, Texas. He attended Texas State University (then known as Southwest Texas State University), where he studied political science. While at the Southwest Texas State, he became involved with the school's student senate. He later became chairman of the student senate and met former President Lyndon B. Johnson, a prominent alumnus of the school, through that office.

== Career ==
Martin began serving as an assistant sergeant at arms at the Texas Capitol while studying at Southwest Texas State. Shortly thereafter, two years following his meeting Johnson, a Johnson aide introduced Martin to then-United States Senator Lloyd Bentsen. Martin left school to take a job as travel aide during Bentsen's campaign for the 1976 Democratic presidential nomination.

Following Bentsen's 1976 campaign for the Democratic presidential nomination, Martin helped direct the campaign of then-state Attorney General and Democratic gubernatorial nominee John Luke Hill during the 1978 Democratic primary and Texas gubernatorial general election. John Hill beat incumbent Governor Dolph Briscoe in the Democratic primary by running a progressive campaign, but lost in the general election to Republican Bill Clements. The 1978 election was the first time since Reconstruction that a Republican won the governorship of Texas.

In 1982, the 28-year-old Martin led the Democratic coordinated campaign for all state elections while also heading Bentsen's successful reelection campaign for the United States Senate. That year Democrats swept statewide offices and incumbent Republican Governor Bill Clements lost in the general election to Democrat Mark White. Other Democrats who won office that year include Jim Mattox for attorney general, Ann Richards for state treasurer, Garry Mauro for land commissioner, and Jim Hightower for agriculture commissioner.

Governor Mark White appointed Martin to a six-year term on the Texas State University System Board of Regents in 1985. The board of regents oversaw the system's member institutions, which at the time were Angelo State University, Sam Houston State University, Sul Ross State University, and Southwest Texas State University (now Texas State University), Martin's alma mater. Martin became chairman of the board in 1988 and served on the board in that capacity until his term expired in 1991. Martin received the Southwest Texas State University Distinguished Alumni award following his regency.

In 1988, Martin led Bentsen's successful reelection campaign for the United States Senate. Later that year Martin founded Public Strategies, a public affairs and communication firm. The firm was financed with a small loan Martin secured on farmland that he had inherited from his father. He purchased the name Public Strategies from James Johnson and Richard Holbrooke for $1. Johnson and Holbrooke had previously owned a consultancy of the same name, which they sold to Lehman Brothers in the early 1980s. The two later served as members of Public Strategies' advisory board.

Public Strategies' first client was Southwest Airlines, whose co-founder, Herb Kelleher, was a friend of Bentsen. The firm continued to work in Democratic politics during the early 1990s. Public Strategies worked on the campaigns of Democratic candidates during the 1990 Texas election cycle, including winners Governor Ann Richards, and Lt. Governor Bob Bullock. Martin chaired Richards' gubernatorial transition team following her election. The firm also advised national Democratic leadership, with Martin serving as an adviser to the Democratic Senatorial Campaign Committee and the chairman of the Democratic National Committee. By 1994, the firm decided to move away from partisan politics and concentrate solely on corporations and business groups.

Martin remained chairman of the Public Strategies following its 2006 acquisition by the WPP Group. Four years later, in November 2010, WPP Group merged Public Strategies with Hill & Knowlton, another communications firm it owned. Martin became global chairman of the newly merged Hill & Knowlton and was appointed global chief executive officer of the firm in January 2011. Hill & Knowlton was renamed Hill+Knowlton Strategies in December 2011.

- Chairman and CEO of Hill+Knowlton Strategies

== Personal life ==
Martin is married to Patsy Woods Martin, a former regent of Texas Tech University.
