= Times Square Tower =

Office skyscraper in Manhattan, New York

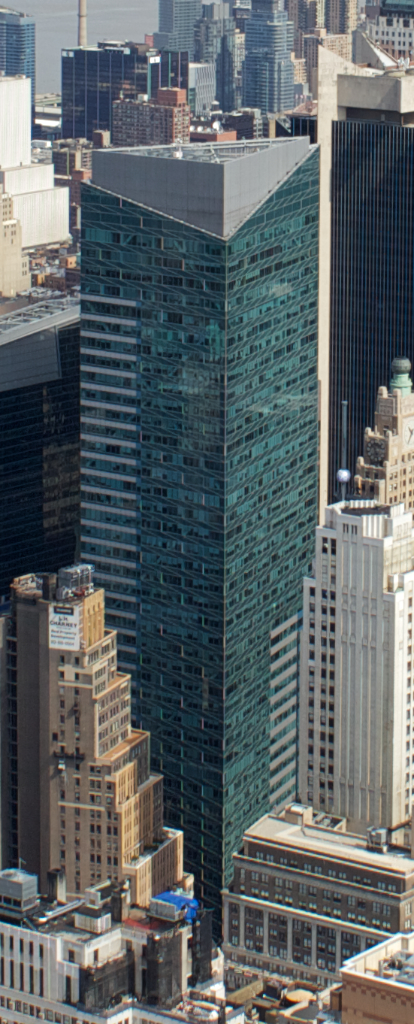
- Interactive map of the Times Square Tower area

General information
- Type: Office
- Location: 7 Times Square, Manhattan, New York
- Coordinates: 40°45′20″N 73°59′12″W
- Construction started: 2002
- Completed: 2004
- Opening: April 2004
- Owner: New York City Department of Citywide Administrative Services
- Operator: Boston Properties/Norges Bank

Height
- Roof: 724 ft (221 m)
- Top floor: 685 ft (209 m)

Technical details
- Floor count: 48
- Floor area: 1,079,378 ft^{2} (100,277.5 m^{2})
- Lifts/elevators: 20

Design and construction
- Architect: David Childs of Skidmore, Owings and Merrill
- Developer: Boston Properties
- Structural engineer: Thornton Tomasetti
- Main contractor: Turner Construction

Times Square Tower, also known as 7 Times Square, is a 48-story office skyscraper at the southern end of Times Square in the Midtown Manhattan neighborhood of New York City, New York, U.S. Located on the city block bounded by Broadway, 42nd Street, Seventh Avenue, and 41st Street, the building measures 724 feet (221 m) tall. The building was designed by David Childs of Skidmore, Owings & Merrill and developed by Boston Properties. The site is owned by the New York City Department of Citywide Administrative Services, though Boston Properties and Norges Bank have a long-term leasehold on the building.

Childs planned the facade as a glass curtain wall, with large billboards on lower stories as part of the 42nd Street Development Project. The foundation consists of shallow footings under most of the site, though parts of the plot abut New York City Subway tunnels and are supported by caissons. The steel superstructure includes a wind-resisting lattice of diagonal beams across the exterior of the tower, as well as a mechanical core. The building contains 1.2 million square feet (110,000 m^{2}) of floor space, much of which is devoted to offices. The lowest three stories contain retail space and an entrance to the Times Square subway station.

During the 1980s and early 1990s, Park Tower Realty and the Prudential Insurance Company of America had planned to develop a tower for the site as part of a wide-ranging redevelopment of West 42nd Street. After the successful development of the nearby 3 and 4 Times Square, Boston Properties developed both 5 Times Square and Times Square Tower. Work started in 2001 after accounting firm Arthur Andersen was signed as the anchor tenant. Arthur Andersen's lease was canceled following the Enron scandal, and the building was completed in 2004 as a speculative development. In 2013, Norges Bank bought a partial stake in the leasehold.

== Site ==
Times Square Tower, also known as 7 Times Square, is at the southern end of Times Square in the Midtown Manhattan neighborhood of New York City, New York, U.S. It occupies an entire city block bounded by Seventh Avenue to the west, 41st Street to the south, Broadway to the east, and 42nd Street to the north. The land lot is trapezoidal and covers 22,448 square feet (2,085.5 m^{2}), with a frontage of 205.41 feet (62.61 m) on Broadway. The 42nd Street side measures 80 feet (24 m) long and is parallel to the 41st Street side, which is 120 feet (37 m) long. Nearby buildings include 5 Times Square, the New Amsterdam Theatre, and the Candler Building to the west; the New Victory Theater and 3 Times Square to the northwest; One Times Square to the north; 4 Times Square and the Bank of America Tower to the northeast; and the Knickerbocker Hotel and Bush Tower to the east.

The site is directly bounded on all sides by New York City Subway tunnels. An entrance to the subway's Times Square–42nd Street station, served by the 1, 2, 3, 7, <7>, N, Q, R, W, and S trains, is within the base of the building on 42nd Street. The entrance was developed by the Metropolitan Transportation Authority (MTA) as the main entrance for the Times Square station complex. The entrance predates Times Square Tower, having opened in July 1997. It features a bright neon and colored glass flashing sign with train route symbols and the word "Subway", as well as escalators. There is also an elevator within this entrance.

3, 4, and 5 Times Square, along with Times Square Tower, comprise a grouping of office buildings that were developed at Times Square's southern end in the late 1990s and early 2000s. The surrounding area is part of Manhattan's Theater District and contains many Broadway theatres.

=== Previous buildings ===
The site of Times Square Tower had been occupied by hotels since 1885. The site was previously occupied by the 7- and 11-story Heidelberg Building, built in 1909. That building was mostly abandoned for much of its history, without even advertising signage, before being demolished in 1984 for the 42nd Street Redevelopment (see Times Square Tower § Early plans). The foundation of the building was partially retained in the present tower. In 1996, the site became the Hansens Times Square Brewery, a 240-seat brewpub above the subway entrance, with large windows overlooking 42nd Street. Its rooftop sign had a British Airways-branded Concorde aircraft, measuring 102 feet (31 m) long and weighing 24,000 pounds (11,000 kg).

== Architecture ==
Times Square Tower was designed by David Childs of Skidmore, Owings & Merrill (SOM) and was developed by Boston Properties. The New York Times cites Gordon Smith Corporation as the curtain wall consultant, though the Council on Tall Buildings and Urban Habitat states Permasteelisa worked on the curtain wall. Thornton Tomasetti was the structural engineer, Jaros, Baum & Bolles was the mechanical, electrical, and plumbing engineer, Mueser Rutledge Consulting Engineers was the geotechnical engineer, and Vollmer Associates was the site civil engineer. In addition, Grace Construction Products was the fireproofing supplier and Jordahl was the facade supplier. Officially, the New York City Department of Citywide Administrative Services owns the structure.

Times Square Tower has 48 usable floors above ground (Note: The New York City Department of City Planning cites the building as being 38 stories. Emporis and The Skyscraper Center both cite the building as being 40 stories.) and measures 726 feet (221 m) to its architectural tip. The roof is 696 feet (212 m) above ground. There are also two basement stories measuring up to 30 feet (9.1 m) deep.

=== Form and facade ===
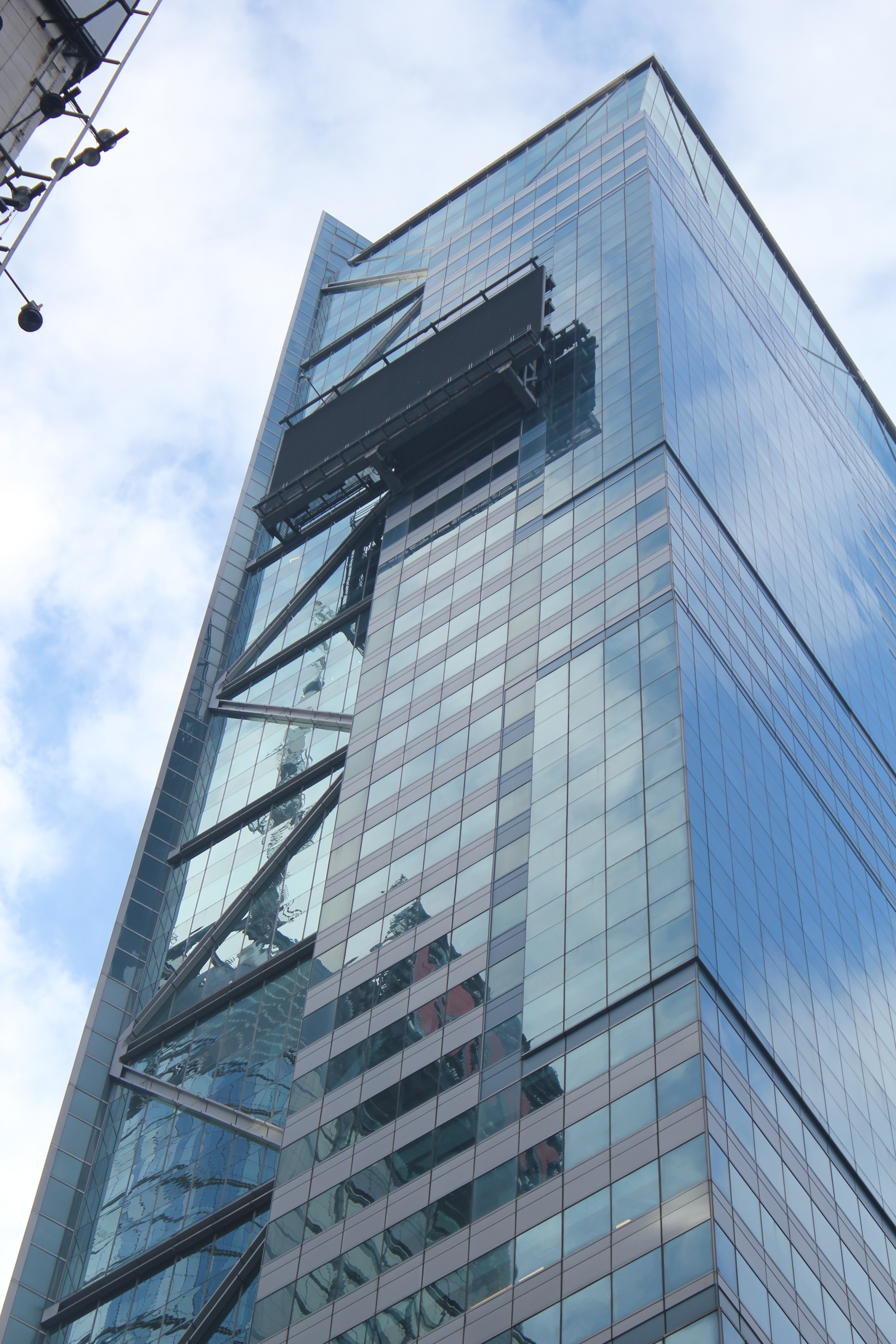
Top of the 42nd Street facade

The building is part of the 42nd Street Development Project and, thus, could bypass many city zoning rules such as those relating to floor area ratio (FAR). The tower follows the 42nd Street Development's zoning rules, which do not require setbacks or sky exposure planes at higher stories, and which also allow a much higher FAR for usable space. Consequently, Times Square Tower occupies its entire site, with a FAR of 42. On average, the building is 113 feet (34 m) wide from west to east. As a result of the small site, the 42nd Street facade has an aspect ratio of 9, and the 41st Street facade has an aspect ratio of 4.5. The 42nd Street Development Project also mandated a minimum floor area and a minimum number of stories. Since mechanical, electrical, and plumbing systems did not count toward these minimums, they were placed on the roof.

Times Square Tower contains several electronic billboards on its facade, which obscure much of the second through fourth floors. These billboards are included as part of the 42nd Street Development Project and were intended to evoke Times Square's historical signage. Most of the large signs are found near the base, but one 4-story sign is found above the middle of the building. In late 2011, an electronic billboard replaced the static billboard toward the top of the tower. Times Square Tower's facade itself is composed of eleven separate designs. The building contains diagonal patterns on its exterior, which form part of the steel superstructure (see Times Square Tower § Superstructure). The Gordon H. Smith Corporation provided Building Envelope Consulting services for the project.

=== Structural features ===
==== Substructure ====
Underneath the site is durable Hartland bedrock, which is covered in some places by soil or weathered rock. Before the tower was constructed, the contractors made nine borings. They found that the Hartland bedrock had been covered by 15 to 50 feet (4.6 to 15.2 m) of manmade fill, with the thickest fill underneath the north end of the site. The southern lot line is adjacent to the IRT Flushing Line subway tunnel (used by the 7 and <7> trains) under 41st Street, which runs about 26 feet (7.9 m) beneath the lowest basement level and 55 feet (17 m) below the street level. The site also abuts the BMT Broadway Line (N, Q, R, and W trains), which is about 38 feet (12 m) under Broadway, and the IRT Broadway–Seventh Avenue Line (1, 2, and 3 trains), which is about 28 feet (8.5 m) under Seventh Avenue.

The foundation had to be excavated in phases because of the small site, and the north end of the foundation could not be excavated mechanically. Some of the foundation footings are reused from the former Heidelberg Building at the north end of the site, where the existing subway entrance could not be closed. Rust buildup was sandblasted from some of the preexisting foundations, which were incorporated into Times Square Tower's foundations. Most of the building is constructed on shallow foundations. Because the underlying rock is weathered, the footing subgrade has a bearing capacity of 380 megapascals (55,000 psi), less than the surrounding area. Near the Flushing Line tunnel, the south wall is supported by mini-caissons that are about 18 inches (460 mm) in diameter, while the southeast and southwest corners are supported by caissons measuring 7 feet (2.1 m) across. The corner caissons are made of three smaller caissons with steel cores, which are grouted together. The New York City Department of Buildings granted the builders a waiver to use higher-strength material for the caissons.

==== Superstructure ====
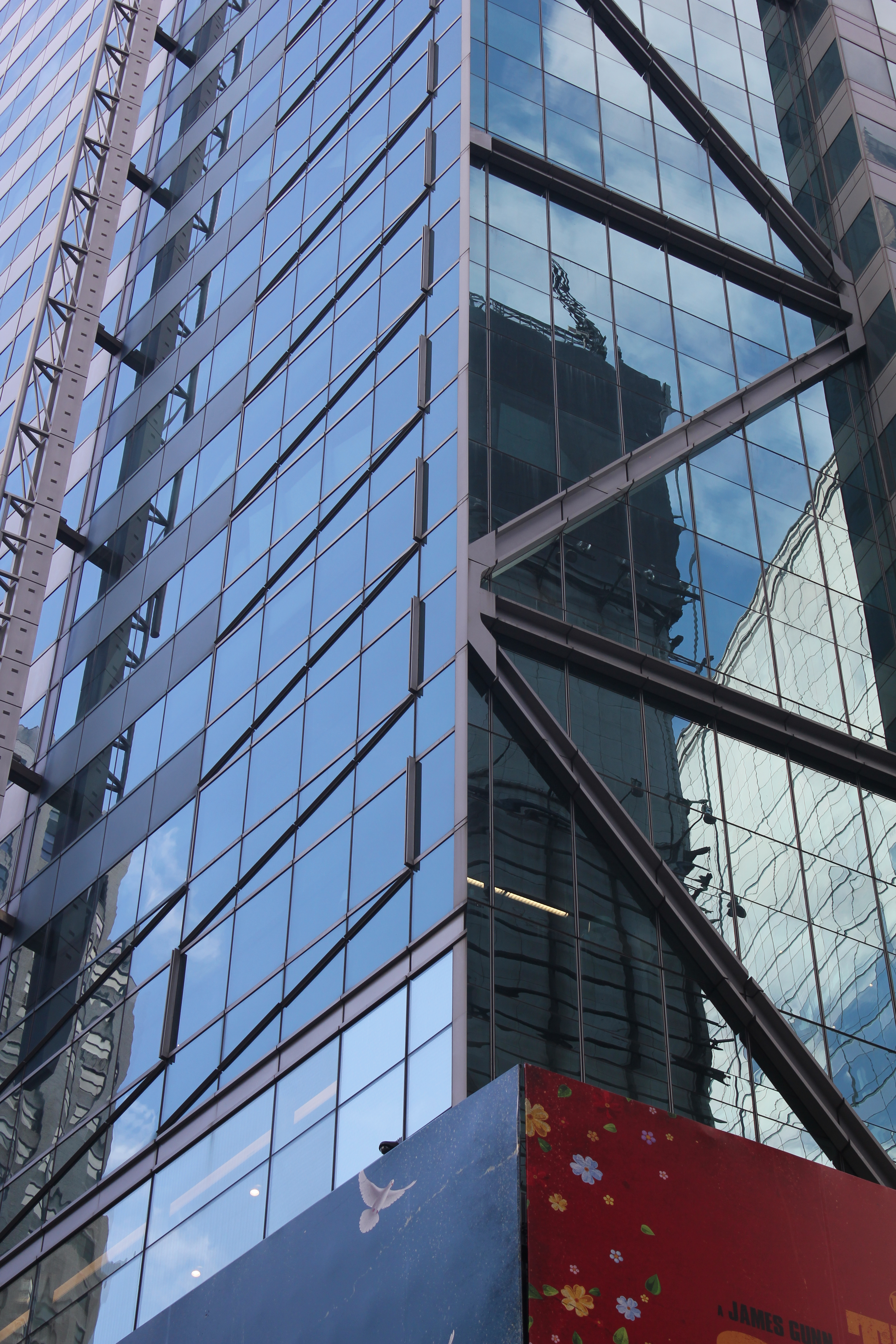
Detail of facade showing the intersection of diagonal beams on the north side

The building's steel weighs 28 pounds per square foot (1.3 kPa) on average. The building contains an exterior-braced structural system on its perimeter. The engineers had initially contemplated using a framed tube structural system, but they dropped this plan since it would have required extremely-closely-spaced columns at the base, which would have prevented the inclusion of storefronts there. The building instead uses an exterior super-bracing system, which consists of diagonal beams 30 feet (9 m) apart, spanning multiple stories.

A belt truss wraps around the building from the second floor to just below the fifth floor; it transfers wind loads from the upper stories to the base. The columns around the base are spaced 60 feet (18 m) apart, twice as wide as the upper stories. The northeast-corner column is omitted at the base, so loads from the northeast corner of the upper stories are transferred to the northern and eastern facades. On upper stories, the diagonal beams on the north and south facades intersect the corner columns at different stories than the diagonal beams on the west and east. This was done because the developers wanted each corner office to have unobstructed views on at least one side. By contrast, in typical buildings, the diagonal beams intersect the corner columns at the same story on each side, strengthening the tube but blocking views where the diagonal beams intersect. For additional structural safety, the structural beams are welded at the joints.

Because of the small floor area, the structural engineers minimized the size of the mechanical core to increase the usable space. The core measures 38 by 120 feet (12 by 37 m). The structural engineers could not stabilize the superstructure with outrigger walls, connecting the core and the exterior, because of the lack of mechanical spaces on intermediate stories. The engineers determined that it would not be efficient to build outrigger walls at the base and top. Since the core is not braced, it carries only gravity loads. The floor slabs consist of composite metal decks measuring 3 inches (76 mm) deep. The slabs consist of composite steel beams between the core and exterior, measuring 35 to 50 feet (11 to 15 m) long. The steel beams can support a live load of 50 pounds per square foot (2.4 kPa), though some framing connections can support greater loads. The floor-to-ceiling height of each story is 9.5 feet (2.9 m), while the distance between floor slabs is 13.5 feet (4.1 m).

=== Interior ===
Times Square Tower has a total floor area of about 1.2 million square feet (110,000 m^{2}), though its gross floor area is 1,079,378 square feet (100,277.5 m^{2}). The retail space covers about 52,000 square feet (4,800 m^{2}). The base has three levels of retail space: the first basement, ground story, and second story. The office space takes up the approximately 1,160,000 square feet (108,000 m^{2}) remainder of the building. Due to the small area of the site, each story only has about 22,300 square feet (2,070 m^{2}). The building is served by 27 elevators. Elevators from the ground story lead to a "sky lobby" on the fifth floor, where the building's main elevator banks are located. The elevators contain a destination dispatch system, wherein passengers request their desired floor before entering the cab. The elevators are grouped into three banks, which serve the lower, middle, and upper office stories.

The office spaces contain air conditioning that can be controlled by tenants. Some of the office space has been customized. For example, Gensler designed two stories for law firm Brown Rudnick with materials such as marble floors, wooden ceilings, and metal-and-glass partitions. Law firm Manatt, Phelps & Phillips, which occupied three stories, designed its space with a conference center and glass walls. Clothing retailer Ann Taylor's twelve stories were designed by HOK, which arranged private offices at the center of each floor, surrounded by workstations. Most of Ann Taylor's private offices were designed in two sizes, while Ann Taylor's workstations were arranged in groups of four and came in 15 layouts. Ann Taylor's offices also had a bar and cafeteria, as well as storage space for clothing.

== History ==
=== Development ===
==== Early plans ====
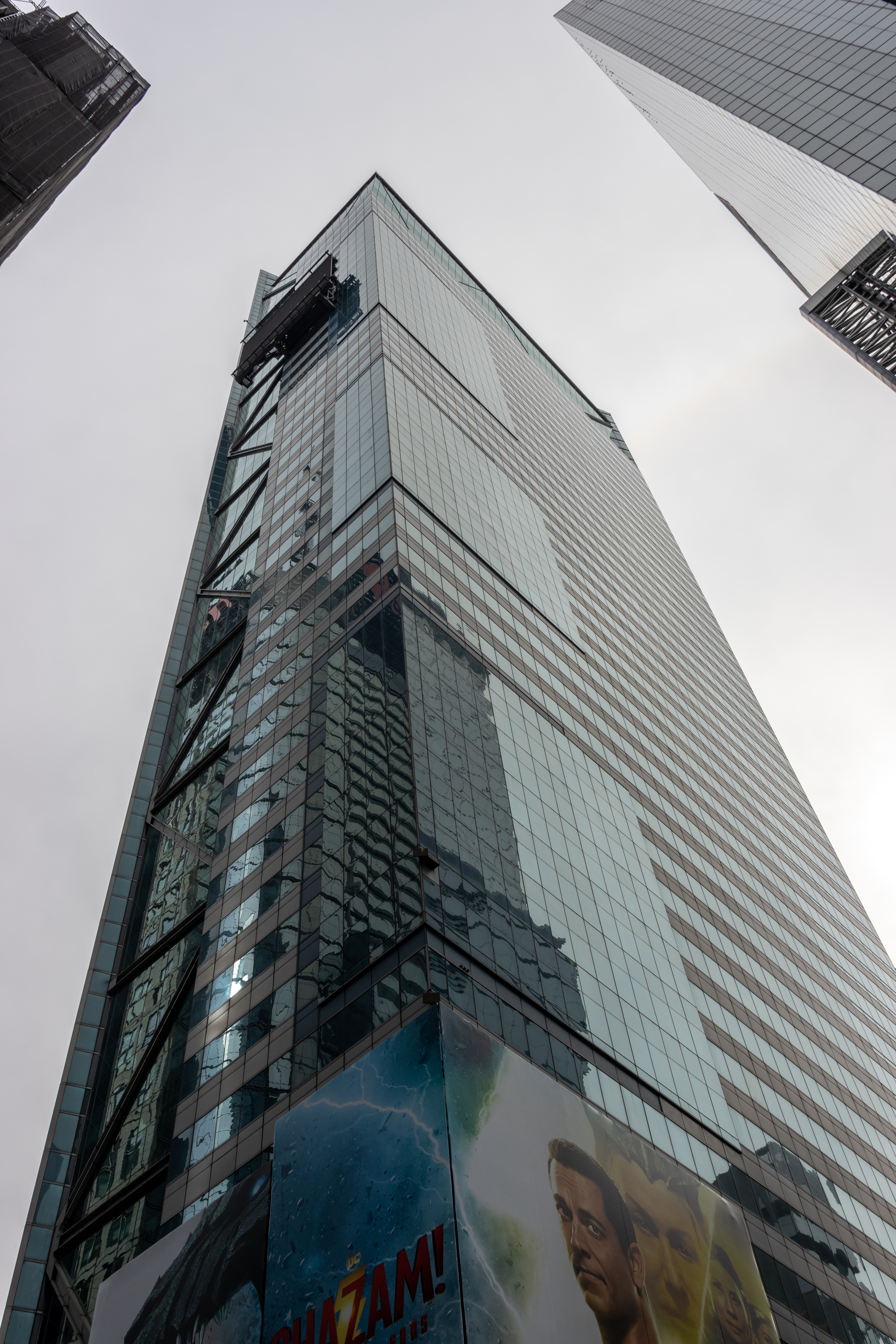
The building seen from ground level

The Empire State Development Corporation (ESDC), an agency of the New York state government, had proposed redeveloping the area around a portion of West 42nd Street in 1981. Four towers designed by Philip Johnson and John Burgee were to be built around 42nd Street's intersections with Broadway and Seventh Avenue. (Note: The sites were: Northwest corner of 42nd Street and Seventh Avenue: now 3 Times Square; Northeast corner of 42nd Street and Broadway: now 4 Times Square; Southwest corner of 42nd Street and Seventh Avenue: now 5 Times Square; South side of 42nd Street between Seventh Avenue and Broadway: now 7 Times Square (Times Square Tower)) These towers would have been redeveloped by George Klein of Park Tower Realty, though the Prudential Insurance Company of America joined the project in 1986. Furthermore, as part of the West Midtown special zoning district created in 1982, the New York City government had allowed new buildings in Times Square to be developed with an increased floor area ratio. To ensure the area would not be darkened at nightfall, the city passed zoning regulations that encouraged developers to add large, bright signs on their buildings.

Opposition from the Durst Organization, along with Prudential and Park Tower's inability to secure tenants for the proposed buildings, led government officials to allow Prudential and Park Tower to postpone the project in 1992. By then, Prudential had spent $300 million on condemning the sites through eminent domain. The partners retained the right to develop the sites in the future, and the ESDC's zoning guidelines remained in effect. In exchange for being permitted to delay construction of the sites until 2002, Prudential and Park Tower were compelled to add stores and install large signage on the existing buildings. The Hansens Times Square Brewery, with its Concorde rooftop sign, opened on the site in 1996. The subway entrance below the brewery opened the following year.

Klein ceded decision-making power for the sites to Prudential, which decided to exit the real-estate market altogether, selling off all four sites. Prudential and Klein dissolved their partnership in 1996. The same year, Douglas Durst acquired the site at the northeast corner of Broadway and 42nd Street, and he developed 4 Times Square there. Prudential and Park Tower decided to market the three other sites after the successful development of 4 Times Square. In March 1997, Prudential indicated its intent to sell the sites' development rights or lease the sites to developers. The northwest corner of Seventh Avenue and 42nd Street was taken by Reuters, which enlisted Rudin Management as its development partner and built 3 Times Square on that corner. In June 1997, Marriott International proposed a 700-room Courtyard by Marriott hotel for the south side of 42nd Street between Broadway and Seventh Avenue, on what is now the Times Square Tower's site.

==== Boston Properties plans ====
By the end of 1997, several developers including Durst, Burton Resnick, Steven Roth, and Jerry Speyer were reportedly bidding for the Disney site at the southwest corner of 42nd Street and Seventh Avenue. Klein partnered with The Blackstone Group in his bid. Prudential opened bidding for the two remaining sites in March 1998, offering over $200 million in tax breaks for both sites. The same month, Philip Johnson and Alan Ritchie proposed a 40-story structure on the southwest corner and a 49-story structure on the southeast corner. This plan included a facade system designed by Fernando Vasquez and Sussman/Prejza, which consisted of rectangular panels clipped onto the spandrels, allowing advertisements to be shown directly on the facade. Herbert Muschamp of The New York Times regarded the scheme as having "earned a place in the history of ideas", despite being similar to a previous plan for the site.

A joint venture of Klein, Blackstone, and Boston Properties ultimately won the right to acquire both sites for $330 million. Boston Properties, operated by Mortimer Zuckerman, would take majority ownership, while Klein's Park Tower would have a small stake. Zuckerman and Klein had been encouraged to bid for the site in part because the ESDC had offered to allow a combined 71,442 square feet (6,637.2 m^{2}) across both sites. Real estate experts had considered the southeast-corner site to be the less valuable of the two sites due to its relatively small area. Nevertheless, after leasing 5 Times Square to Ernst & Young in mid-1999, Boston Properties began looking for a tenant for the southeast-corner site. Boston Properties did not want to start construction until a major tenant had been secured.

The Walt Disney Company and HBO were both reportedly considering offices on either site, but HBO reneged in early 1999, and Disney would not occupy enough space in the southeast-corner site to be considered an anchor tenant. Boston Properties was reviewing five proposals for tenants by January 2001, and it made an offer to Clifford Chance Rogers & Wells, then the world's largest law firm. Simultaneously, accounting firm Arthur Andersen was facing eviction from 1345 Avenue of the Americas, where it had fourteen floors. Arthur Andersen began negotiating with Boston Properties since there was little other space that the firm could occupy elsewhere. The company agreed in principle to lease some of the space in July 2000 and committed to lease about half the building's space that October. Two months later, the lease was finalized and Boston Properties acquired the site. Arthur Andersen was negotiating to receive $10 million in tax exemptions from the city government. Childs was hired to design Times Square Tower, a 47-story structure on the site, costing $600 million.

=== Construction ===
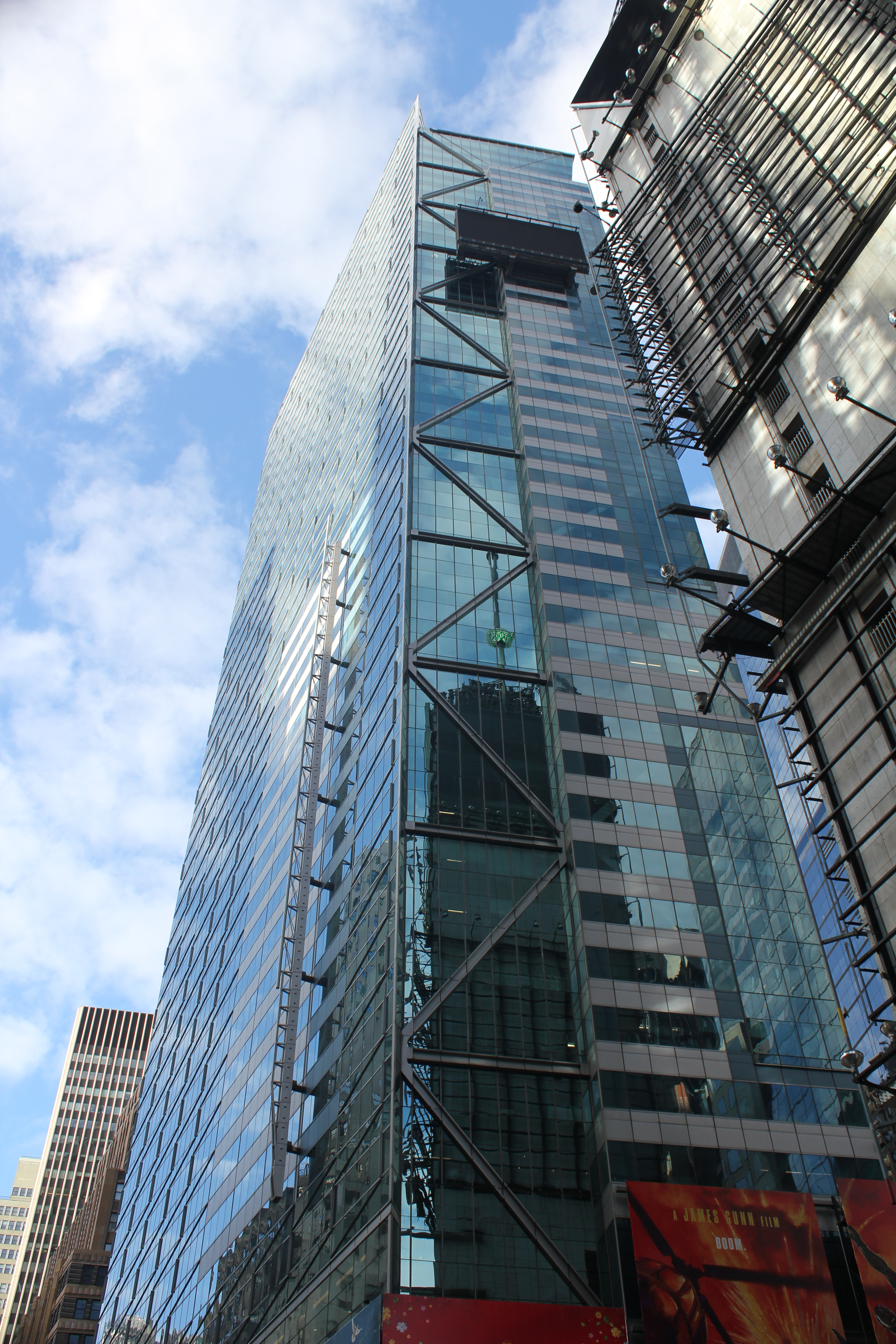
Seen from the north

Boston Properties solicited demolition bids in December 2000, and demolition began in early 2001. The Concorde above the former Times Square Brewery was removed. Times Square Tower and its three neighboring developments would collectively add almost 4 million square feet (370,000 m^{2}) of office space. All four projects were being marketed with a Times Square address, which until the early 1990s had not been popular in the city's real estate market. At the time, rents for commercial space around Times Square were increasing drastically. Excavations began in June 2001 and an official groundbreaking ceremony took place on September 5, 2001. With the September 11 attacks less than a week afterward, the real estate industry expected increased demand for office space in Times Square Tower and other structures from displaced tenants of the destroyed World Trade Center. However, the expected demand did not arise.

Arthur Andersen became involved in the Enron scandal during late 2001 and early 2002 but initially committed to its space at Times Square Tower. By March 2002, the firm was considering abandoning its lease at Times Square Tower. Boston Properties wished to terminate the firm's lease to avoid prolonged legal issues, and the developer had already received five offers from other firms to occupy that space. The foundations were substantially completed the next month, when a Boston Properties spokesperson said Arthur Andersen "will not be occupying the space". Arthur Andersen's lease was formally terminated in June 2002. Boston Properties started marketing Times Square Tower to law firms, which took up large amounts of space, making them desirable tenants for the developer. Less than a week after Arthur Andersen's lease was canceled, law firm Pillsbury Winthrop negotiated to occupy part of the building, though Pillsbury instead decided to occupy 1540 Broadway, citing lower rents there.

Despite the lack of a main tenant, Times Square Tower was being built by late 2002. Law firm O'Melveny & Myers became the first tenant to sign a lease at Times Square Tower in January 2003, occupying eight stories. O'Melveny & Myers's lease allowed Boston Properties to market the other stories at their official asking rates of $50 to $70 per square foot ($540 to $750/m^{2}). Meanwhile, the September 11 attacks had prompted Thornton Tomasetti to revise plans for the building's structural system. To reduce disruption, the contractors performed material and equipment deliveries during off-peak hours. The work also involved reconstructing the subway entrance at the building's base before the skyscraper itself opened. The subway entrance had to remain open during construction. Boston Properties paid for attendants to operate new restrooms in the subway station.

=== Usage ===
Times Square Tower opened in April 2004. Marketing of the retail space began that month following the removal of construction scaffolding. At the time of opening, Justin Davidson of Newsday wrote that the building "aspires to jazz heat mixed with corporate cool". The law firm Heller Ehrman White & McAuliffe, leased about 140,000 square feet (13,000 m^{2}) that July. A month later, clothing retailer Ann Taylor leased part of the retail space and twelve office stories, bringing Times Square Tower to three-quarters occupancy. With about 300,000 square feet (28,000 m^{2}), Ann Taylor was the largest tenant of the tower. Target Corporation leased nine of the exterior signs in late 2004, while Wachovia had a sign atop the building. Law firm Brown Rudnick leased two of the upper floors that October. According to the magazine Real Estate Weekly, Times Square Tower's completion "sealed the [42nd Street Development] with architectural, financial and operational success".

Originally, Boston Properties had placed 63 precast concrete spheres on the sidewalk to protect the building against car bombs. The spheres were removed in late 2006 after counterterrorism experts said the spheres could turn into projectiles during vehicular attacks. The spheres were donated to the New York Hall of Science, a science museum in Queens. Ruby Tuesday leased some retail space in 2007 for a two-story restaurant. By then, much of the building was occupied. Six tenants, including four law firms, collectively occupied 800,000 square feet (74,000 m^{2}). Target continued to run advertising on nine of the building's signs for several years; in 2009, Target changed the billboards so they displayed artwork honoring New York City. In subsequent years, the space was leased to tenants such as law firms Cohen Rabin Stine Schumann, Ashurst LLP, White and Williams LLP, and Manatt, Phelps & Phillips.

In June 2013, Boston Properties placed the building's leasehold for sale with a starting price of $1.6 billion. At the time, Ann Taylor, O'Melveny & Myers, and law firm Pryor Cashman were among the largest tenants, while Ann Taylor and Ruby Tuesday occupied the retail space. Boston Properties sold a 45 percent leasehold stake to Norway's central bank Norges Bank in September 2013 for $684 million. In 2018, Boston Properties started renovating the sky lobby with a tenants' cafeteria. Ann Taylor parent company Ascena Retail Group continued to be one of the building's largest tenants, extending its lease in 2017. After Ascena went bankrupt in 2020, Boston Properties tried to recover millions of dollars in unpaid rent, as it could not lease Ascena's office space to another tenant unless Ascena broke its lease. A Pink Taco restaurant opened at Times Square Tower in 2023. In 2026, Boston Properties (by then renamed BXP) began looking to sell the lease on the site for $700–750 million.
