= Pottier & Stymus =

American furniture and design firm

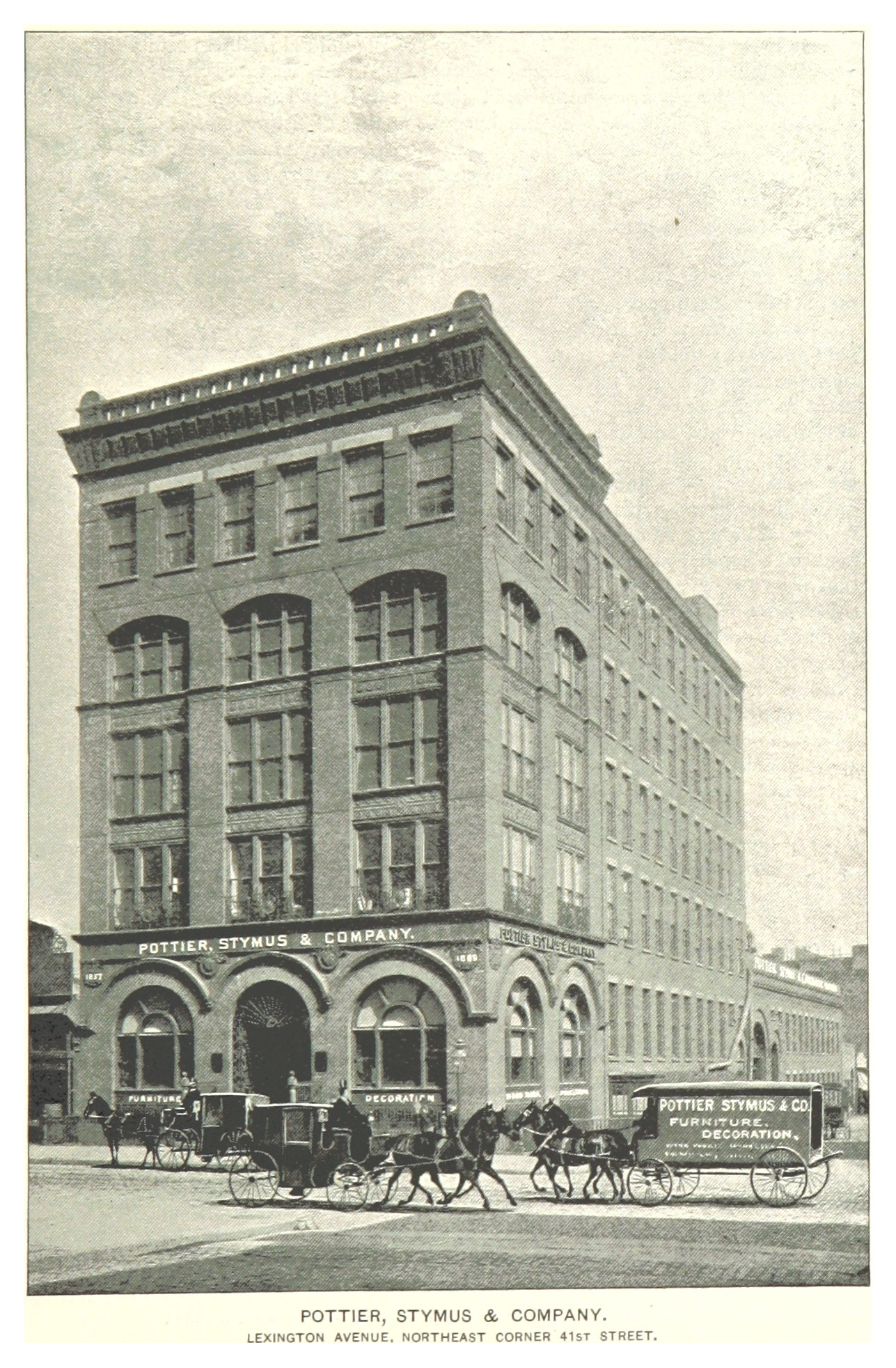
Pottier & Stymus factory building on Lexington Avenue in New York City

Pottier & Stymus was a prominent American furniture and design firm of the Victorian period.

== Company ==
August Pottier, an immigrant from France, and William P. Stymus Sr. opened the company in New York City in 1859. Their workshop was on 115 Wooster Street, and their salesroom was at 623 Broadway. The company grew quickly, and by 1871 the firm's factory occupied a full block on Lexington Avenue and 42nd Street, on the present site of the Socony-Mobil Building. By 1872, they employed 700 men and 50 women. Pottier & Stymus made furniture in the Neo-Greco, Renaissance Revival, Egyptian Revival, and Modern Gothic Styles. Three drawing published in Harper's New Monthly Magazine in November 1876 provide evidence that in addition to exclusive furniture for office buildings and rich clients, Pottier & Stymus also produced simpler and cheaper furniture. Some of Pottier & Stymus' work can be seen at the Brooklyn Museum.

== Notable clients ==
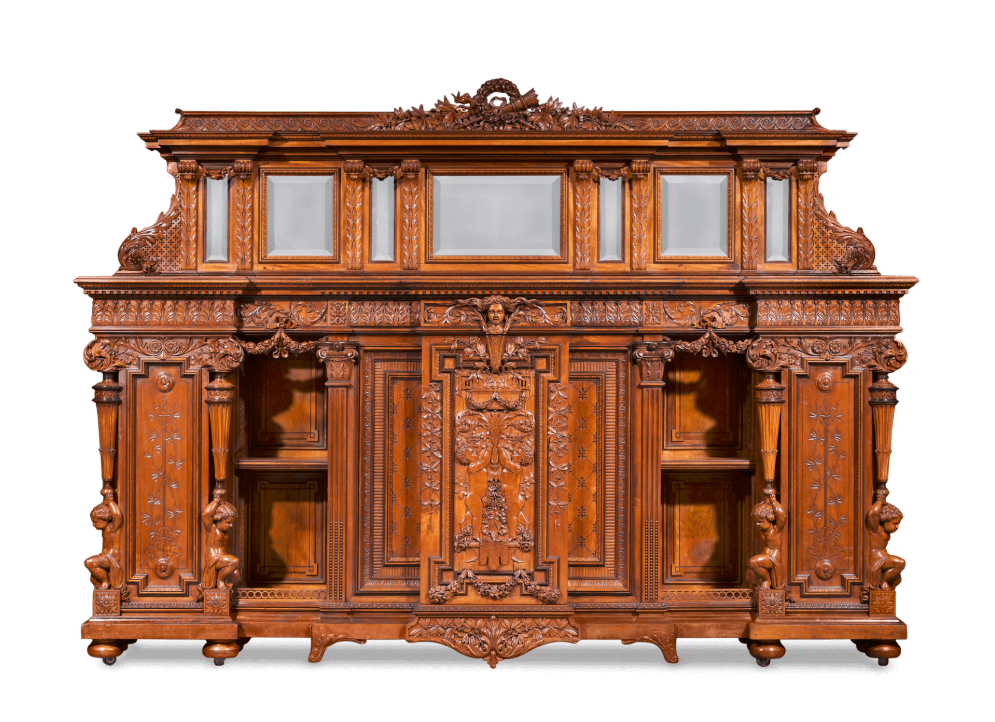
Sideboard by Pottier & Stymus owned by Henry Osborne Havemeyer. Circa 1875-1885

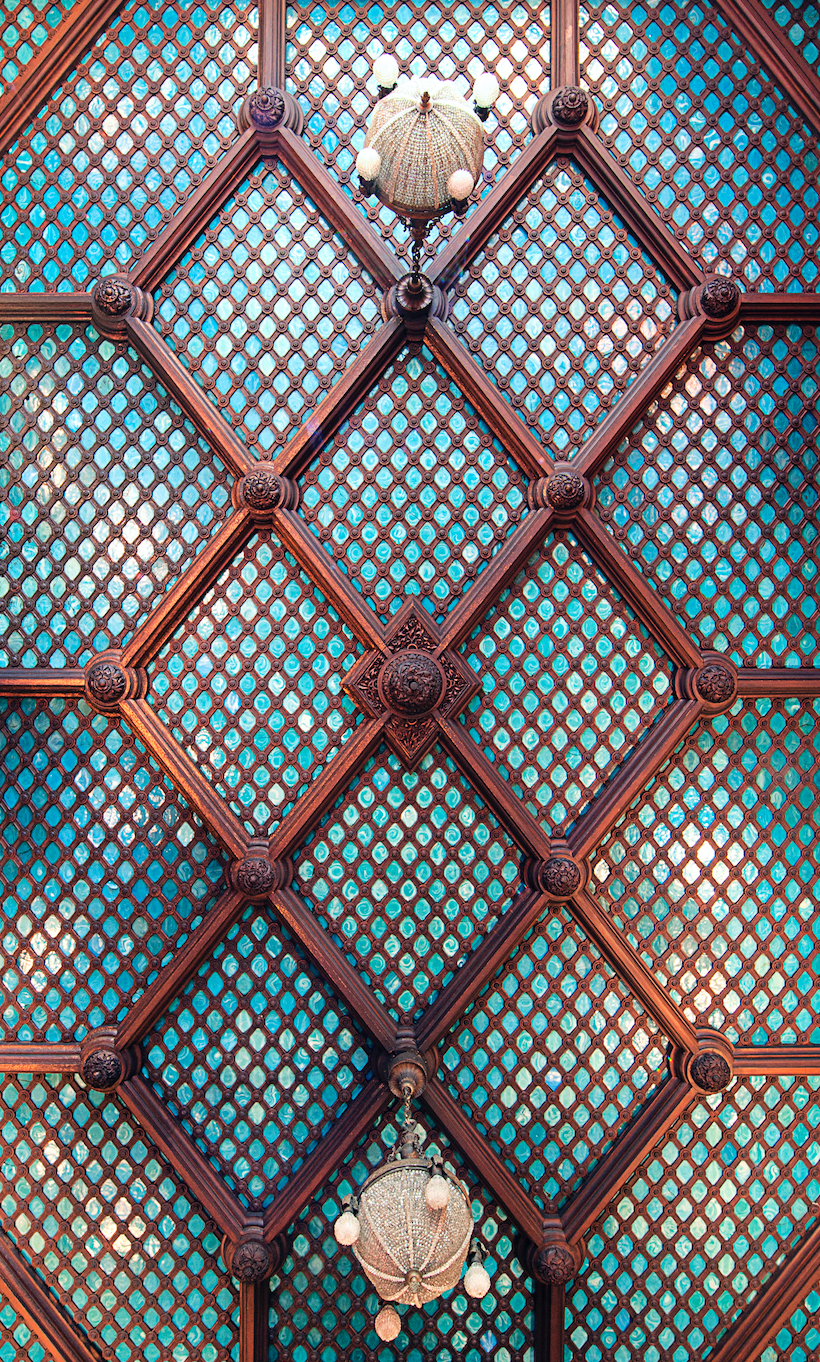
- Blue Ceilings at The National Arts Club in New York City, designed by Pottier & Stymus
  President Ulysses S. Grant - In 1869 Pottier & Stymus made furniture for the President's Office and the Cabinet Room.
- Henry Flagler - Pottier & Stymus were chosen to design Flagler's Gilded Age winter home named Whitehall in Palm Beach, Florida.
- William Rockefeller
- The National Arts Club - In the 1860s, Pottier & Stymus were hired as part of the renovation of the Samuel J. Tilden Mansion, now home of The National Arts Club, led by Calvert Vaux. The firm designed an iconic blue ceiling that remains today.
- Railway baron Leland Stanford - His house in Palo Alto, California in 1875.
- Thomas Edison - Between 1882 and February 1884, Pottier & Stymus worked on the Glenmont Estate in Llewellyn Park in New Jersey. Architect Henry Hudson Holly designed and built the house for Henry C. Pedder in 1880. Shortly thereafter, Pedder was found guilty of fraud, and the house passed into the hands of his employer, Arnold Constable & Company. In 1885 just after his second marriage, Thomas Edison purchased the house for his new wife, Mina Miller. Edison lived in the home for 45 years. Of the original 120 pieces Pedder purchased from Pottier and Stymus about 70% remain. In 1888, Edison commissioned Pottier & Stymus to make some changes and additions to the property. Glenmont Estate is currently a National Historical Park. Only two rooms still retain their interior design decorations. The gold Lyncrusta wall covering in the main hall and the ceiling and wall stenciling in the library. All others were removed or painted over during the years the Edison’s lived there.

== System of documentation ==
From the Golden Book of Celebrated Manufacturers and Merchants published on the occasion of the Centennial Exhibition in Philadelphia, it is known that Pottier & Stymus used a detailed system of documentation for their products. From the beginning of the construction process, each piece of furniture was assigned a multi-digit number, and pieces which belonged together were given sequential numbers. Few objects were clearly marked making definitive identification difficult, but when marked, Pottier & Stymus used one of three methods: pencil, impressions or stencil in black ink.
