= Don Knowlton =

American public relations professional

Donald Snow Knowlton (November 22, 1892 – July 27, 1976) was an American public relations executive. He co-founded Hill and Knowlton with John W. Hill.

== Life and career ==
Knowlton was born in Cleveland, Ohio. He graduated from Lincoln-West High School and Western Reserve University. He became advertising manager at Union Trust Co., including managing the bank-owned radio station WJAX. He authored the 1926 book These Bankers during that time. Union Trust closed during the Great Depression, so Knowlton joined Hill in the new venture. In 1946, Hill and Knowlton dissolved their partnership, and Knowlton took over the direction of Hill & Knowlton Cleveland, which closed shortly after Knowlton's retirement in 1962.

Knowlton also maintained an interest in music. His mother, Fanny Snow Knowlton, was a composer. He was a banjoist in a jazz band as an adult. Knowlton wrote one of the first serious discussions of jazz as an American art form in a 1926 article for Harper's, entitled "The Anatomy of Jazz."

== Selected publications ==
- Profit and Loss (1944)
- Brick House Stories (1936)
- Advertising for Banks (1932)
- Cooperation in Public Relations (1931)
- These Bankers (1926)
