= 5 Times Square =

Office skyscraper in Manhattan, New York

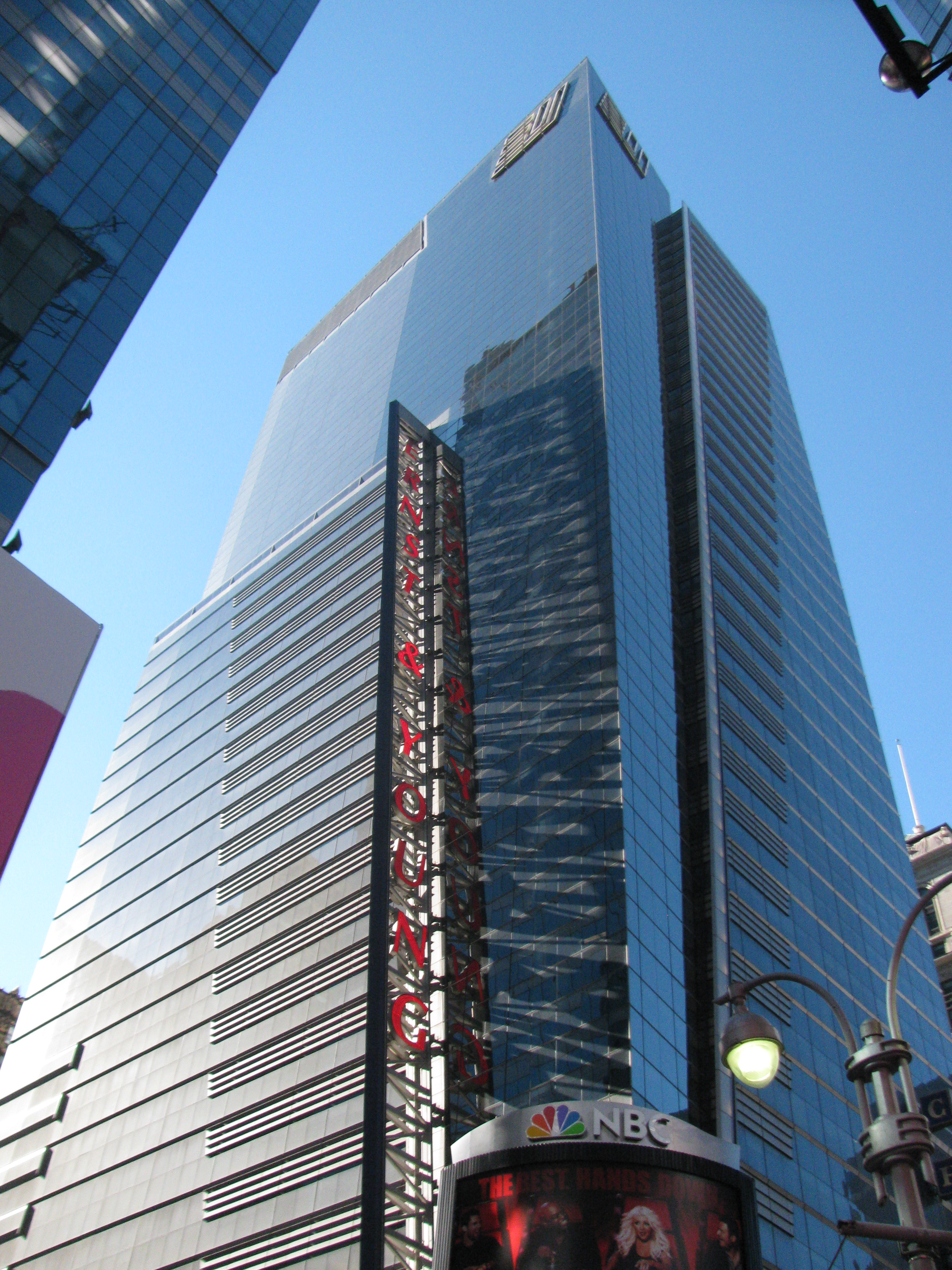

General information
- Type: Office
- Location: Times Square, Manhattan, New York
- Coordinates: 40°45′21″N 73°59′16″W
- Construction started: 1999
- Completed: 2002
- Opening: May 2002
- Owner: New York City Economic Development Corporation
- Operator: David Werner/RXR Realty

Height
- Roof: 575 ft (175 m)
- Top floor: 540 ft (160 m)

Technical details
- Floor count: 38
- Floor area: 1.1×10^{6} ft^{2} (100,000 m^{2})
- Lifts/elevators: 20

Design and construction
- Architect: Kohn Pedersen Fox
- Developer: Boston Properties
- Structural engineer: Thornton Tomasetti
- Main contractor: Turner Construction

5 Times Square is a 38-story office skyscraper at the southern end of Times Square in the Midtown Manhattan neighborhood of New York City, New York, U.S. Located on the western sidewalk of Seventh Avenue between 41st and 42nd Street, the building measures 575 feet (175 m) tall. The building was designed by Kohn Pedersen Fox Associates (KPF) and developed by Boston Properties for Ernst & Young (EY). The site is owned by the New York City Economic Development Corporation, though David Werner and RXR Realty have a long-term leasehold on the building.

KPF planned the facade as a glass curtain wall, with large billboards on lower stories as part of the 42nd Street Development Project. The foundation consists of shallow footings under most of the site, though parts of the plot abut New York City Subway tunnels and are supported by caissons. The steel superstructure includes a wind-resisting lattice steel beams, as well as a mechanical core. The building contains 1.1 million square feet (100,000 m^{2}) of floor space, much of which is devoted to offices. The lowest three stories contain retail space and an entrance to the Times Square subway station.

During the 1980s and early 1990s, Park Tower Realty and the Prudential Insurance Company of America had planned to develop a tower for the site as part of a wide-ranging redevelopment of West 42nd Street. After the successful development of the nearby 3 and 4 Times Square, Boston Properties developed both 5 Times Square and Times Square Tower. Work started in 1999 after EY was signed as the anchor tenant, leasing the entire building for 20 years. The building opened in 2002. Boston Properties sold the long-term leasehold for 5 Times Square in 2006 to AVR Realty, which resold it in 2014 to a group led by David Werner. RXR Realty purchased a 50 percent ownership stake in the leasehold in 2016 and began to renovate it in 2020. The owners considered converting the building to residential use starting in 2024, and work on the conversion began in 2026.

== Site ==
5 Times Square is on the west side of Seventh Avenue, between 41st Street and 42nd Street, at the southern end of Times Square in the Midtown Manhattan neighborhood of New York City, New York, U.S. The land lot is L-shaped and covers 27,156 ft^{2} (2,522.9 m^{2}), with a frontage of 197.5 feet (60.2 m) on Seventh Avenue, 150 feet (46 m) on 42nd Street, and 125 feet (38 m) on 41st Street. 5 Times Square is at the eastern end of a city block that also contains the New Amsterdam Theatre, Candler Building, and Madame Tussauds New York. Other nearby buildings include the Times Square and Lyric theaters to the northwest, the New Victory Theater and 3 Times Square to the north, One Times Square and 4 Times Square to the northeast, and the Times Square Tower to the east.

An entrance to the New York City Subway's Times Square–42nd Street station, served by the 1, 2, 3, 7, <7>, N, Q, R, W, and S trains, is within the base of the building on 42nd Street. Another entrance to the same station is on 41st Street. 3, 4, and 5 Times Square and the Times Square Tower comprise a grouping of office buildings that were developed at Times Square's southern end in the late 1990s and early 2000s. The surrounding area is part of Manhattan's Theater District and contains many Broadway theatres. The site of 5 Times Square was occupied by a 12-story hotel that opened in the late 1890s, while the New Amsterdam Theatre was built on the adjacent lot around the same time.

== Architecture ==
5 Times Square was designed by Kohn Pedersen Fox Associates (KPF). It was developed by Boston Properties as the New York City offices of Ernst & Young (EY). Quartararo & Associates was the construction manager. AMEC was the main contractor, Thornton Tomasetti was the structural engineer, and Jaros, Baum & Bolles was the mechanical, electrical, and plumbing engineer. Additionally, Mueser Rutledge Consulting Engineers was the geotechnical engineer and Vollmer Associates was the site civil engineer. Officially, the New York City Economic Development Corporation owns the structure. 5 Times Square has 38 stories above ground (Note: The New York City Department of City Planning cites the building as being 38 stories. Emporis and The Skyscraper Center both cite the building as being 40 stories.) and two basements. It measures 575 feet (175 m) to its architectural tip. (Note: A structural engineer for the building cites the height at 571 feet (174 m).) There are also two basement stories measuring up to 30 feet (9.1 m) deep.

=== Form and facade ===
The building is part of the 42nd Street Development Project and, thus, could bypass many city zoning rules such as those relating to floor area ratio (FAR). The tower follows the 42nd Street Development's zoning rules, which do not require setbacks or sky exposure planes at higher stories, which allow a much higher FAR for usable space. Consequently, Times Square Tower occupies its entire site, with a FAR of 36. According to Karrie Jacobs of New York magazine, the building has a varied massing and facades that were appropriate for Times Square's "glitzy character". 5 Times Square rises largely as a slab, with setback sections to the north and east, angling away from the building's northeast corner. Douglas Hocking said that KPF had taken inspiration from Fox & Fowle's designs for 3 and 4 Times Square, as well as Philip Johnson's unbuilt proposals for 3, 4, 5, and 7 Times Square during the 1980s and 1990s. The 42nd Street Development Project also mandated a minimum floor area and a minimum number of stories. Since mechanical, electrical, and plumbing systems did not count toward these minimums, they were placed on the roof.

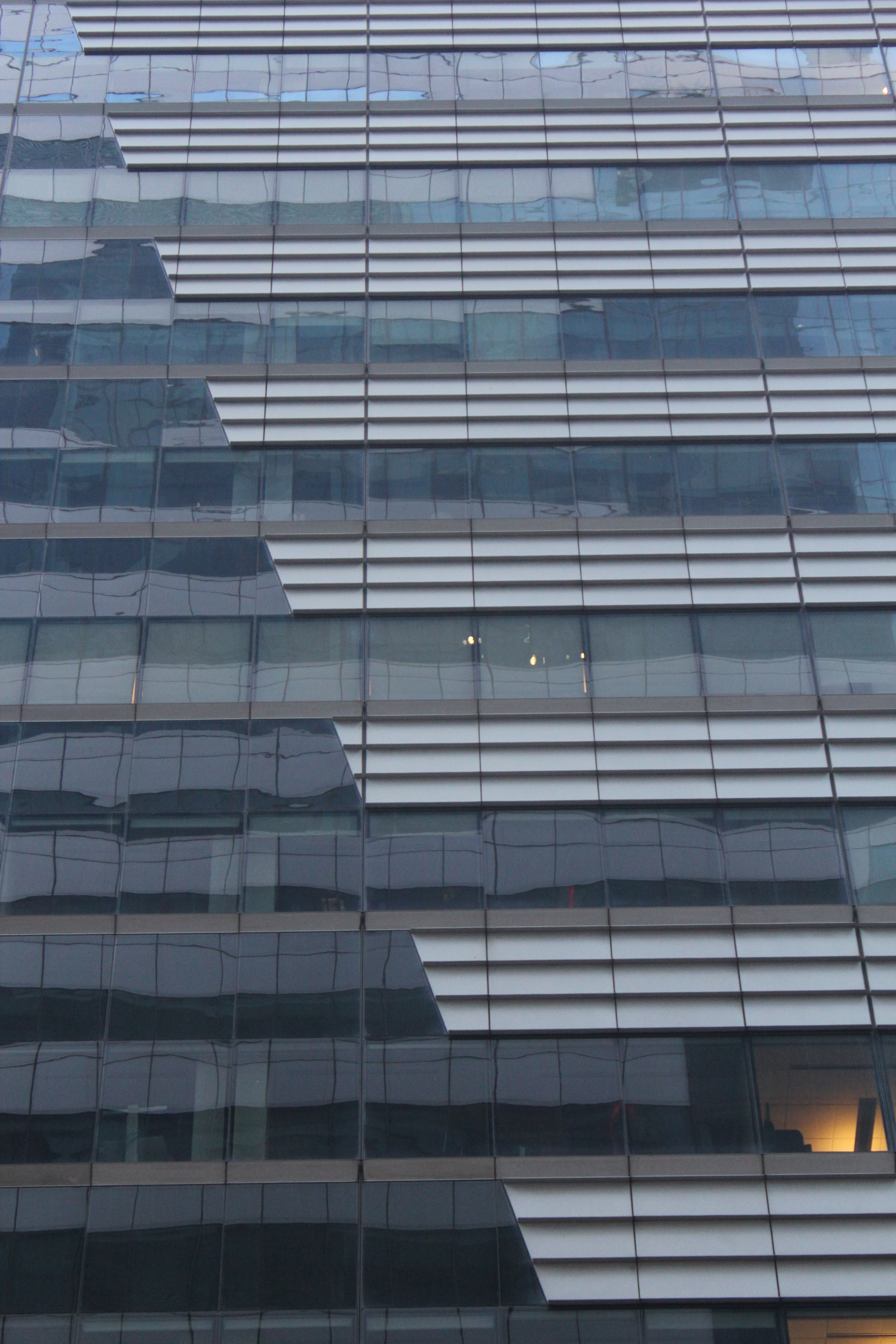
Facade detail

5 Times Square contains several electronic billboards on its facade, which obscure much of the second through fourth floors. These billboards are included as part of the 42nd Street Development Project and were intended to evoke Times Square's historical signage. Specifically, the building was required to contain at least 18,000 square feet (1,700 m^{2}) of advertising signage. At the northeast corner, the signs rise to the seventh story. Hocking said his team used computer models to compare different types of signage. However, the developers' signs had to be separate from those required by the 42nd Street Development Project. As a result, a 22-story-tall vertical sign with the Ernst & Young name was mounted on the northeast corner of the building.

The main office entrance is in the middle of the Seventh Avenue elevation. The corner of Seventh Avenue and 41st Street has an entrance to a three-story Red Lobster restaurant, with a curved revolving neon lobster measuring 10 feet (3.0 m) long. Above the entrance is a curved sign measuring 60 feet (18 m) long. The curtain wall is made of reflective-glass window panes. The spandrels between stories are a mixture of reflective-glass and silver horizontal panels, which are arranged so they appear to form a diagonal "slice". The slice, as well as the massing variations, are intended to depict the diagonal route that Broadway, one block east, follows in relation to the Manhattan street grid. The north and south elevations, as well as the cornice atop the building, contain lighting. The design of the exterior was scrutinized by several governmental agencies, advocacy groups, and potential tenants.

=== Structural features ===
==== Substructure ====
Underneath the site is durable Hartland bedrock, which is covered in some places by soil or weathered rock. Before the tower was constructed, the contractors made four borings. They found that the Hartland bedrock had been covered by 5 to 12 feet (1.5 to 3.7 m) of manmade fill and that there was groundwater about 30 feet (9.1 m) below street level. The southern lot line is adjacent to the IRT Flushing Line subway tunnel (used by the 7 and <7> trains) under 41st Street, which runs about 26 feet (7.9 m) beneath the lowest basement level and 55 feet (17 m) below the street level. The eastern lot line abuts the IRT Broadway–Seventh Avenue Line (1, 2, and 3 trains), which is about 28 feet (8.5 m) under Seventh Avenue. The basement of the New Amsterdam Theatre protrudes under the southern half of the lot and is 20 feet (6.1 m) deep.

The groundwater was drained using sump pumps and most of the building was constructed on shallow foundations. Because the Flushing Line subway tunnel was within 2 feet (0.61 m) of 5 Times Square's lot line, engineering consultant recommended that rock-socketed caissons be built to a point below the tunnel invert, using sensors to detect ground movement. Various methods of reinforcement were used for the lot perimeter. Near the Flushing Line tunnel, the south wall is supported by mini-caissons that are about 12 inches (300 mm) in diameter. The caissons each contain three metal cores and descend to about 8 feet (2.4 m) below the tunnel invert. The New York City Department of Buildings granted the builders a waiver to use higher-strength material for the caissons. The southern lot line also has thirty rock anchors to resist wind uplift; each anchor has a working load of 890 kilonewtons (200,000 lb_{f}). The rest of the foundation is composed of concrete spread footings. The footing subgrade has a bearing capacity of 575 megapascals (83,400 psi).

==== Superstructure ====
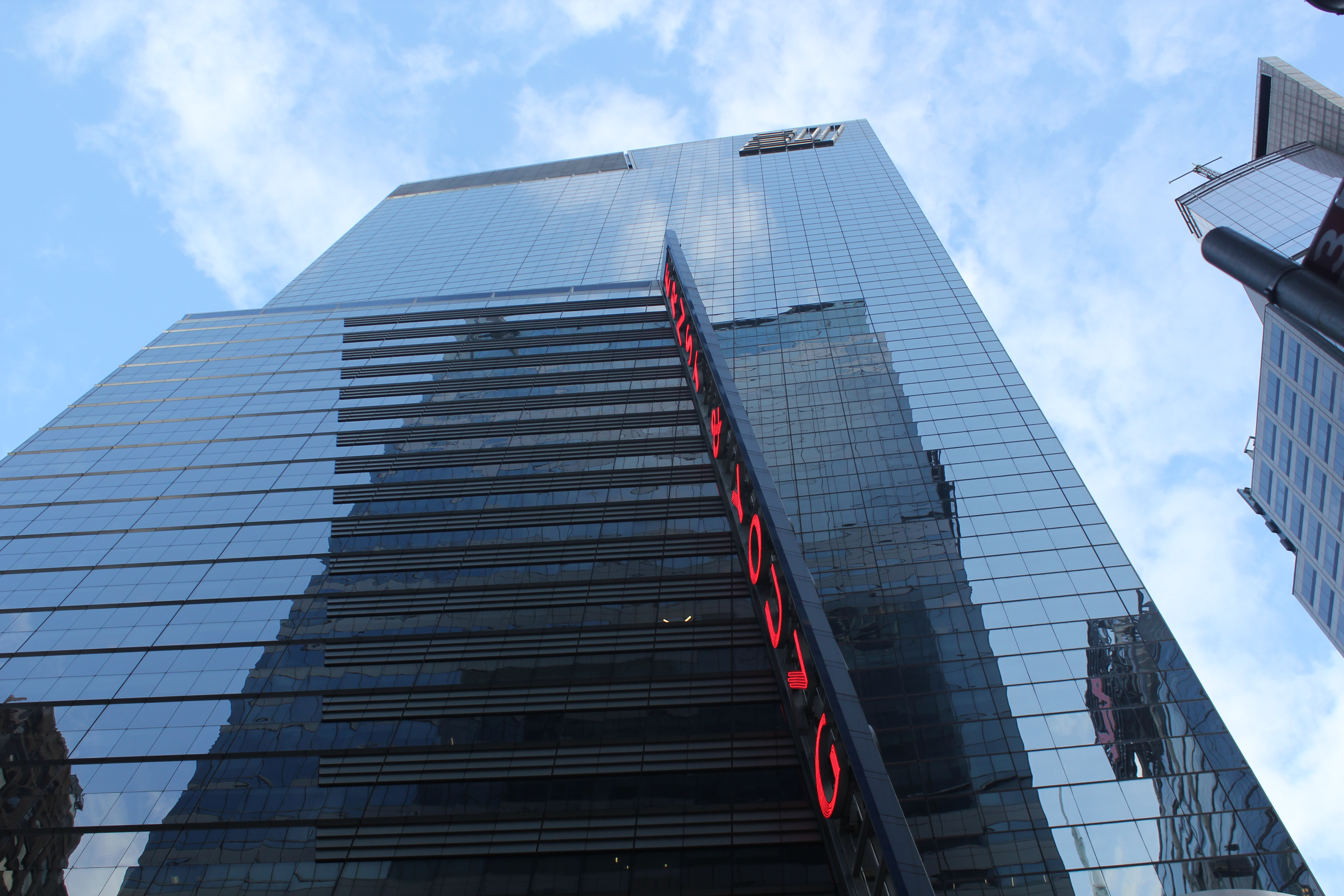
Seen from ground level

The building's steel weighs 26 pounds per square foot (1.2 kPa) on average. The building contains a moment-resisting frame structural system on its perimeter, with closely-spaced columns and horizontal spandrel beams. The frame needed to be able to withstand a wind of up to 110 miles per hour (180 km/h) for three seconds from any direction. The engineers projected the greatest wind loads would come from the north and south elevations, so the columns on these sides are spaced 10 feet (3.0 m) apart. On the west and east elevations, the columns at the extreme north and south ends are spaced 10 feet apart, while those at the center are spaced 30 feet (9.1 m) apart. This creates two C-shaped clusters of columns on the north and south ends of the building, which thus act as two channels and not as a single tube. The columns at the north and south ends were manufactured as two-story segments. Each column has 5-foot-long (1.5 m) beams extending to the left and right, which, when installed, formed horizontal spandrel beams.

Because of the small floor area, the structural engineers minimized the size of the mechanical core to increase the usable space. The core measures 38 by 110 feet (12 by 34 m). The structural engineers could not stabilize the superstructure with outrigger walls, connecting the core and the exterior, because of the lack of mechanical spaces on intermediate stories. The engineers determined that it would not be efficient to build outrigger walls at the base and top. Since the core is not braced, it carries only gravity loads. The floor slabs consist of composite metal decks measuring 3 inches (76 mm) deep. The slabs consist of composite steel beams between the core and exterior, measuring 35 to 50 feet (11 to 15 m) long. The steel beams can support a live load of 50 pounds per square foot (2.4 kPa), though some framing connections can support greater loads.

=== Interior ===
The building has about 1.1 million square feet (100,000 m^{2}) of interior space. A retail space at 5 Times Square's lowest stories wraps around the corner of Seventh Avenue and 42nd Street. The lower-story retail space includes the Red Lobster restaurant, which has a pair of fish tanks with a capacity of 420 U.S. gallons (1,600 L) each. The restaurant was designed with a 79-seat bar and lounge on the ground floor and a 280-seat main dining room on the third floor. The 42nd Street side had a storefront for cosmetics retailer Sephora, which was a narrow and tall space with an upscale boutique area on one wall.

The building is alternately cited as having 20 or 21 elevators. Floor plans indicate that, at the ground floor lobby on Seventh Avenue, the elevators are grouped into two banks: a northern bank with ten elevators and a southern bank with eight elevators. The two banks of elevators are separated by two sets of stairs, one facing west and the other facing east. A freight elevator is accessed from a service entrance on 41st Street. The "low-rise" offices are served by eight elevators in the northern bank, while the "mid-rise" and "high-rise" office stories are served by the southern bank. Gensler originally designed EY's offices in an open plan. EY partners had offices of about 150 square feet (14 m^{2}) on the perimeter of each story, with glass walls to allow sunlight to illuminate the open-plan workspace. The corner spaces were used as conference rooms rather than as private offices. Senior partners had slightly more luxurious offices on the 37th floor, but even the company chairman occupied a relatively small office of 350 square feet (33 m^{2}).

== History ==
=== Development ===
==== Early plans ====
The Empire State Development Corporation (ESDC), an agency of the New York state government, had proposed redeveloping the area around a portion of West 42nd Street in 1981. Four towers designed by Philip Johnson and John Burgee were to be built around 42nd Street's intersections with Broadway and Seventh Avenue. (Note: The sites were: Northwest corner of 42nd Street and Seventh Avenue: now 3 Times Square; Northeast corner of 42nd Street and Broadway: now 4 Times Square; Southwest corner of 42nd Street and Seventh Avenue: now 5 Times Square; South side of 42nd Street between Seventh Avenue and Broadway: now 7 Times Square (Times Square Tower)) These towers would have been redeveloped by George Klein of Park Tower Realty, though the Prudential Insurance Company of America joined the project in 1986. Furthermore, as part of the West Midtown special zoning district created in 1982, the New York City government had allowed new buildings in Times Square to be developed with an increased floor area ratio. To ensure the area would not be darkened at nightfall, the city passed zoning regulations that encouraged developers to add large, bright signs on their buildings.

Opposition from the Durst Organization, along with Prudential and Park Tower's inability to secure tenants for the proposed buildings, led government officials to allow Prudential and Park Tower to postpone the project in 1992. By then, Prudential had spent $300 million on condemning the sites through eminent domain. The partners retained the right to develop the sites in the future, and the ESDC's zoning guidelines remained in effect. In exchange for being permitted to delay construction of the sites until 2002, Prudential and Park Tower were compelled to add stores and install large signage on the existing buildings. The southwest corner of 42nd Street and Seventh Avenue was leased in July 1995 by The Walt Disney Company; the site was occupied by a 18,000-square-foot (1,700 m^{2}) Disney Store, which opened in late 1996.

Klein ceded decision-making power for the sites to Prudential, which decided to exit the real-estate market altogether, selling off all four sites. Prudential and Klein dissolved their partnership in 1996. The same year, Douglas Durst acquired the site at the northeast corner of Broadway and 42nd Street, and he developed 4 Times Square there. Prudential and Park Tower decided to market the three other sites after the successful development of 4 Times Square. In March 1997, Prudential indicated its intent to sell the sites' development rights or lease the sites to developers. The northwest corner of Seventh Avenue and 42nd Street was taken by Reuters, which enlisted Rudin Management as its development partner and built 3 Times Square on that corner.

==== Boston Properties plans ====
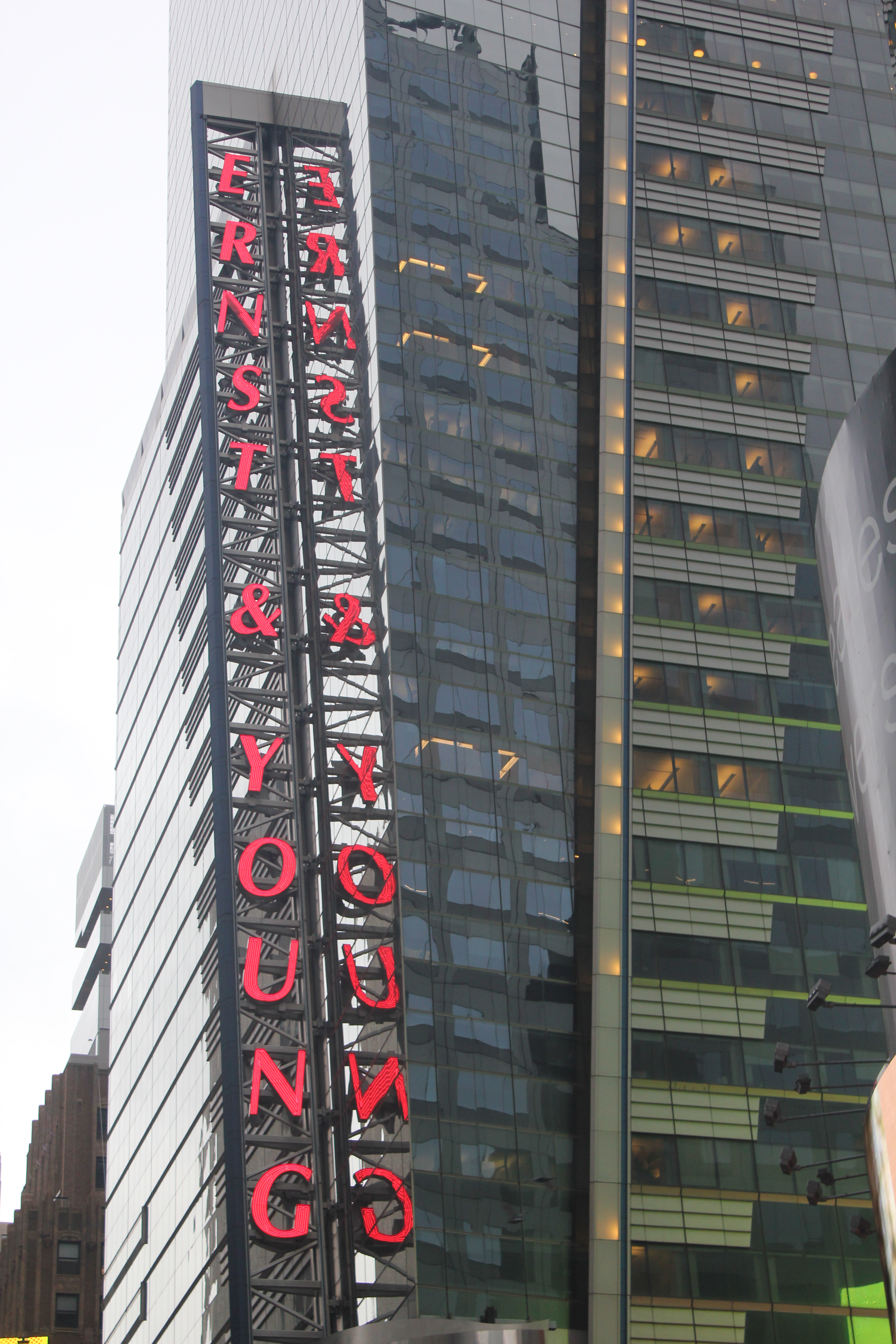
Ernst & Young vertical sign

By the end of 1997, several developers including Durst, Burton Resnick, Steven Roth, and Jerry Speyer were reportedly bidding for the Disney site at the southwest corner of 42nd Street and Seventh Avenue. Klein had partnered with The Blackstone Group in his bid. Prudential opened bidding for the two remaining sites in March 1998, offering over $200 million in tax breaks for both sites. The same month, Philip Johnson and Alan Ritchie proposed a pair of buildings: a 40-story structure on the southwest corner and a 49-story structure on the southeast corner. This plan included a facade system designed by Fernando Vasquez and Sussman/Prejza, which consisted of rectangular panels clipped onto the spandrels, allowing advertisements to be shown directly on the facade. Herbert Muschamp of The New York Times regarded the scheme as having "earned a place in the history of ideas", despite being similar to a previous plan for the site.

A joint venture of Klein, Blackstone, and Boston Properties ultimately won the right to acquire both sites for $330 million. Boston Properties, operated by Mortimer Zuckerman, would take majority ownership, while Klein's Park Tower would have a small stake. Zuckerman and Klein had been encouraged to bid for the site in part because the ESDC had offered to allow a combined 71,442 square feet (6,637.2 m^{2}) across both sites. Real estate experts had considered the southwest-corner site, that now occupied by 5 Times Square, to be the more valuable of the two sites due to the other lot's relatively small area. Kohn Pedersen Fox was selected as the architect for the southwestern-corner site in May 1998. Boston Properties did not immediately take possession of either site but, in January 1999, agreed to buy the sites within the following two years for $312.25 million. Disney and HBO were both reportedly considering offices on either site, but HBO reneged in early 1999. Disney planned to reopen its store at the base of 5 Times Square when the new building was completed.

Ernst & Young expressed interest in moving from 787 Seventh Avenue to Boston Properties' southwest-corner lot, but the firm asked the city government for $65 million in subsidies in May 1999. To encourage the firm to stay in New York City rather than relocate to New Jersey, the administration of mayor Rudy Giuliani agreed to give Ernst & Young $20 million or $22 million in tax abatement. The deal included a $10 million sales tax exemption on materials and equipment, as well as $2 million for training and $5.5 million for electricity. In August 1999, Boston Properties announced it would develop 5 Times Square, a 37-story headquarters for Ernst & Young on the southwest-corner lot. Ernst & Young would pay $1 billion to lease the building for 20 years.

=== Construction ===
The foundation was constructed from November 1999 to August 2000, requiring the demolition of the Disney store. 5 Times Square and its three neighboring developments would collectively add almost 4 million square feet (370,000 m^{2}) of office space. All four projects were being marketed with a Times Square address, which until the early 1990s had not been popular in the city's real estate market. At the time, rents for commercial space around Times Square were increasing drastically. 5 Times Square was expected to cost $536 million in total. The steel superstructure was being erected by early 2001, with a hundred ironworkers employed on the project. Many of the project's ironworkers were Mohawk Native Americans, a group that had historically helped construct some of the city's other office buildings.

By September 2001, Ernst & Young was planning to sublease some of its space at the building. Despite the September 11 attacks in Lower Manhattan shortly afterward, retail chain Champs Sports took some storefront space by the end of 2001. When Giuliani's mayoral term expired at the end of that year, he created the consulting firm Giuliani Partners, which was to take space at 5 Times Square when the building was completed. Meanwhile, accounting firm Arthur Andersen's lease at the neighboring Times Square Tower had been terminated in mid-2002 amid the Enron scandal. Following this, EY hired 332 former Andersen employees to join the new 5 Times Square office.

=== Office usage ===
==== 2000s ====
The building was completed in May 2002, and EY began moving 3,300 employees to 5 Times Square. By that September, 4,000 employees had moved in, occupying all the office floors. Upon the building's opening, there was 200,000 square feet (19,000 m^{2}) of vacant space, though this was not publicly advertised. The Department of Finance valued 5 Times Square in 2003 at $355 million, a 65 percent increase from the previous year's valuation of $215 million. A three-story Red Lobster restaurant opened at the base in July 2003. The base also contained the Times Square Brewery, which had been displaced from the site of Times Square Tower, as well as a Champs Sports store. A freight elevator in the building crashed in 2004, killing one person.

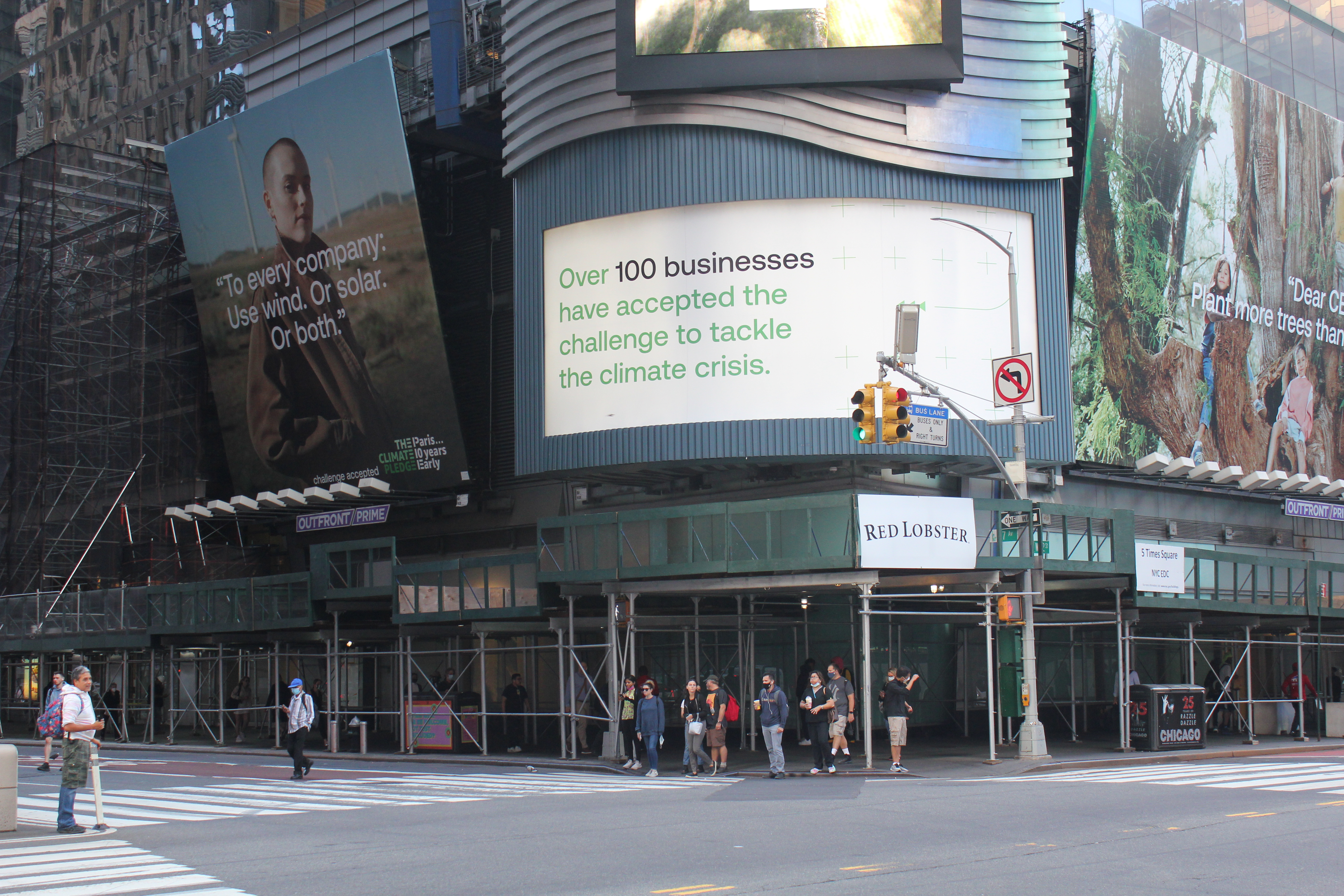
Rounded corner around the base of 5 Times Square

Boston Properties attempted to sell 5 Times Square in early 2006 to Istithmar World. However, Istithmar declined to buy the building because of tax concerns, specifically the fact that EY would be the auditor for the sale. After putting the building back for sale in October 2006, Boston Properties sold it the following month to AVR Realty for $1.28 billion in cash, or about $1,125 per square foot ($12,110/m^{2}). The sale, a record for the time, was part of a trend of real estate investment trusts purchasing Midtown property in the mid-2000s. That year, NBC Universal erected a screen and two billboards above the building's Champs Sports store, totaling 3,500 square feet (330 m^{2}). Cosmetics store Sephora opened a store at the building's base in July 2009.

==== 2010s and early 2020s ====
AVR hired CBRE Group to market the building in 2011 in advance of a possible sale. A group led by David Werner purchased 5 Times Square in 2014 for $1.5 billion, the largest office transaction in the city in four years. Werner's group acquired a mezzanine loan of $150 million from RXR Realty. In early 2016, RXR purchased a 50 percent stake for $800 million. At the time, the $1 billion loan that had been used to finance Werner's purchase of the building was expected to come due in March 2017. EY was also looking to vacate up to 170,000 square feet (16,000 m^{2}) at 5 Times Square, though it had five years remaining on its lease. At the expiry of the original loan, RXR and Werner secured a $1.4 billion refinancing with Morgan Stanley. This included restructuring an existing $782 million loan and a new mezzanine loan of $618 million. EY indicated in late 2017 that it would move to 1 Manhattan West when its 5 Times Square lease expired. and Champs Sports also relocated in 2018. Sephora planned to relocate as well.

During the COVID-19 pandemic in New York City in August 2020, SL Green Realty indicated it would sell a $126 million mezzanine loan on the property to raise money. RXR and Werner had used $200 million of their own equity to renovate the building. RXR spent $50 million to renovate the interiors just before the expiry of EY's lease in 2022. The work included refurbishing the lobby, replacing the exterior signs, and adding an elevator within the subway entrance, as well as adding an amenity area with a bar, gym, and restaurant. In January 2022, Roku, Inc. leased 240,000 square feet (22,000 m^{2}) on the building's top eight floors, as well as the rights to control the vertical sign on Seventh Avenue. Shortly afterward, RXR sought to refinance the building for $1.5 billion. In September 2022, RXR refinanced the building with a $1.3 billion loan from multiple firms including Morgan Stanley and Apollo Global Management. SL Green also became a partner in the renovation, changing its mezzanine loan into an equity loan. Only 31% of the building's space was occupied at the time. By 2023, Miniso had opened a variety store within the building.

=== Residential conversion ===
RXR and Werner began considering converting 5 Times Square into a residential building in mid-2024. By then, the developers were no longer leasing out the building's space to commercial tenants. The building's occupancy rate had declined to 20% by that October, when Apollo obtained an ownership stake in the building. In December 2024, Apollo, RXR, and SL Green filed plans to convert the vacant space into 942 apartments at a cost of $95 million. Gensler was hired to design the conversion, and the owners announced that the building would be rebranded as 592 Seventh Avenue when the project was completed. The planned number of apartments had been increased to 1,250 by early 2025, of which 200 would be single-bedroom apartments and 1,050 would be studio apartments. One-fourth of the units would be rented at below market rates; RXR planned to rent these out to younger residents. About 37,000 square feet (3,400 m^{2}) would continue to be rented out as storefronts.

Before the apartments could be built, the owners had to revise the site's general property plan, which would supersede zoning restrictions that precluded the development of apartments there. In May 2025, the Empire State Development Corporation approved plans to convert 5 Times Square into 1,250 apartments. By the beginning of January 2026, the conversion of 5 Times Square had begun; completion of the first phase is planned for completion in 2027. Due to the long-term renovation, the building's Red Lobster closed in 2026.
