= David Werner (real estate investor) =

American real estate investor

- Born: 1953 or 1954 (age 71–72)
- Occupation: Real estate investor
- Known for: Founder of David Werner Real Estate

David Werner (born c. 1953) is an American real estate investor and founder of David Werner Real Estate.

== Biography ==
Werner was born to an Orthodox Jewish family, the son of Holocaust survivors, and raised in the Washington Heights neighborhood of Manhattan.

Werner started his career as an accountant and then began to invest in real estate with partners from his community in Brooklyn. After bidding on a building that was being sold by the estate of real estate investor Sylvan Lawrence, he found out that he had the right to seek a price reduction but instead committed to the transaction as he had given his word. In 1997, he was rewarded for his integrity by Lawrence's heirs who gave him first rights to a portfolio of four buildings which Werner purchased for $387.5 million and sold his interest for a $7.5 million profit. As one of the buildings (111 Eighth Avenue) was later sold to Google for $1.8 billion, Werner changed his investment strategy and started holding a higher interest (typically 10%) for a longer period. Werner is considered a real estate syndicator following the model pioneered by Harry Helmsley meaning that he makes a bid for a property putting down a large nonrefundable cash down payment and then goes to his investor network to raise the additional money to close the transaction and secure a fee. From 2000 to 2014, Werner purchased $10.6 billion in real estate including the 2003 purchase of 11 Madison Avenue for $673 million. In 2012, Werner partnered with Brooklyn real estate investor Joel Schreiber and purchased One Court Square for $481 million in Long Island City, Queens from Stephen L. Green's SL Green and JPMorgan Asset Management. In 2014, with $2.4 billion in purchases, he was the single largest purchaser of real estate in New York City which included the $1.5 billion purchase of 5 Times Square from Allan V. Rose's AVR Realty and the $900 million purchase of the Socony-Mobil Building from Hiro Real Estate. His long time investment partner is Mark Karasick who will own and manage the property while Werner earns a transaction fee and maintains his minority interest. In 2019, he acquired a 30% interest in 237 Park Avenue from Scott Rechler's RXR Realty and Walton Street Capital. In 2023, Werner acquired The Bridge at Collegeville, a 1.9 million SF office and life-science campus in Collegeville, PA. He subsequently renewed the anchor tenant Dow for a 15-year term in what was described as the largest lease in the Philadelphia market in over a decade.

== Personal life ==
Werner lives in the Borough Park neighborhood of Brooklyn with his wife.
