= John W. Hill =

American public relations executive

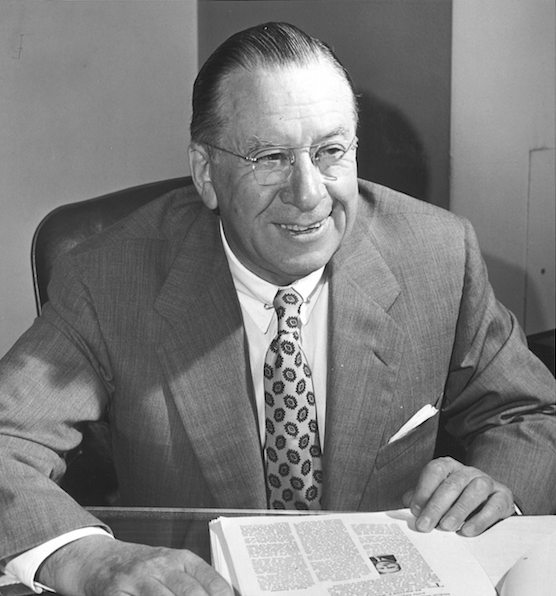
- Born: November 26, 1890; Near Shelbyville, Indiana
- Died: March 17, 1977 (aged 86); New York City
- Known for: Founder of Hill & Knowlton

John Wiley Hill (November 26, 1890 – March 17, 1977) was an American public relations executive. He co-founded Hill & Knowlton with Donald Knowlton in 1933.

== Life and career ==
Hill worked as a journalist for 18 years, eventually becoming an editor and financial columnist. Hill moved to public relations in 1927, opening a firm in Cleveland, Ohio. In 1933, he brought in Donald Knowlton and began their firm. It eventually became the world's largest public relations firm.

Hill personally designed the Tobacco Industry Research Committee in December 1953 in response to the American Cancer Society's mounting epidemiological evidence linking smoking to lung cancer; the TIRC would, over the following four decades, fund research and contest the public-health consensus.

The campaign paid scientists to publicly counter the claims of other scientists who said that smoking led to lung cancer. These scientists then later falsely testified to that effect in court when they were sued by smokers who were dying or suffering from lung-related illnesses due to smoking.

Hill died in Manhattan of a brain tumor.
