= Hill & Knowlton =

Public relations consulting company

- Type: Private
- Industry: Public Relations; Marketing services
- Founded: 1927; 99 years ago, in Cleveland, Ohio, U.S.
- Founder: John W. Hill
- Headquarters: New York City, U.S.
- Number of locations: Over 80 offices (2023)
- Area served: Worldwide
- Key people: Kelli Parsons (CEO)
- Services: Marketing communications Corporate communication Digital marketing Full list of services
- Parent: WPP Group
- Website: www.hillandknowlton.com

Hill & Knowlton is an American global public relations consulting company, headquartered in New York City. The firm has over 80 additional offices in more than 40 countries. The company was founded in Cleveland, in 1927 by John W. Hill and is now owned by the WPP Group and operates under the brand Burson.

== History ==
=== 20th century ===
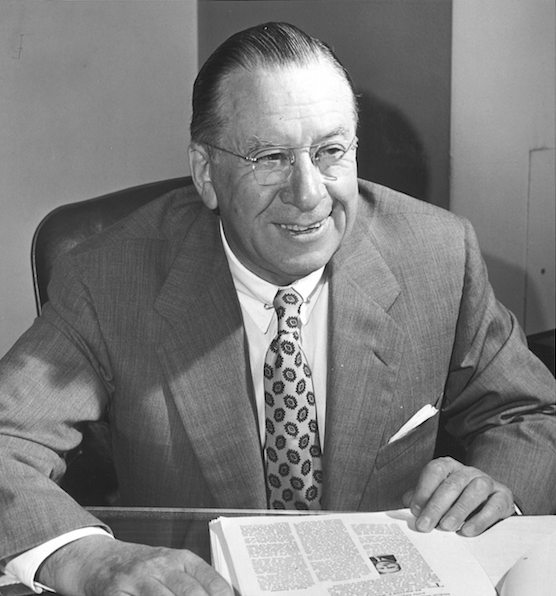
John W. Hill, founder of Hill & Knowlton, c. 1960

The company that became Hill & Knowlton Strategies was founded in 1927 by newspaper reporter and businessman John Hill in Cleveland, Ohio. Hill's first two clients were Cleveland-based Union Trust Company, and the Otis Steel Company.

When Union Trust Company was shut down by the Great Depression in 1933, Hill hired its former director of advertising and publicity Don Knowlton, and they together established Hill & Knowlton of Cleveland. Hill moved to New York City in 1934 to open a new Hill & Knowlton office. Knowlton remained in Cleveland and operated the original location until his retirement in 1964. Hill served as chairman and chief executive until 1962, but remained on the firm's policy committee, and continued to go into the office until shortly before his death in 1977.

The company represented the dairy industry during congressional debates on margarine regulation in the late 1940s.

Other early clients included the tobacco industry, as well as many other industries including the aircraft industry, the American Shipbuilders Council, the National Retail Dry Goods Association, the National Fertilizer Association and soap producers.

When Hill died in 1977, the company had 560 employees, with 36 offices in the United States and 18 abroad. Clients included Texaco Inc., Warner-Lambert, Procter & Gamble, Gillette, and the Business Roundtable.

The firm was acquired in 1980 by the JWT Group, one of the largest advertising agencies at the time. Following the acquisition, Hill & Knowlton continued to operate as an independent entity under the JWT Group.

The company expanded to China in 1984, and acquired both Gray & Company and Carl Byoir & Associates, two public relations firms with a national presence in the United States, in 1986.

JWT was acquired by the WPP plc, a London-based marketing and communications holding company, in 1987. In 1989, Hill & Knowlton acquired Canada's largest PR agency, the Public Affairs Resource Group.

In 1990 Hill and Knowlton was hired by the United States Conference of Catholic Bishops (USCCB) to launch a campaign to persuade Catholics and non-Catholics to oppose abortion rights for women. A third of its employees at headquarters signed a letter of protest.

=== 21st century ===
The firm continued to expand through acquisitions in the 2000s, including the acquisition of a portion of Argentine company Vox Consulting in 2000, Miami-based public relations agency SAMCOR in 2002, and a majority ownership of the Hong Kong-based Rikes Communications in 2008.

In 2009, the firm opened its first office in Nairobi in partnership with Kenyan company Scangroup. In 2010, the company opened three new offices in China as well as new offices in India and Colombia.

In January 2011, Hill & Knowlton announced a merger with Public Strategies, another WPP company founded in Austin, Texas in 1988. In December 2011, the firm was rebranded as "Hill+Knowlton Strategies." The company has since been rebranded to "Hill & Knowlton" before joining the Burson umbrella.

Jack Martin, founder of Public Strategies, oversaw this rebranded company from 2011 until 2019. He was succeeded by AnnaMaria DeSalva.

In August 2021, Hill & Knowlton China, the Chinese arm of the company, announced new strategic advisory services to help local businesses with environmentally friendly business strategies. The new services were part of Hill & Knowlton's support for the COP15 (UN Biodiversity) conference, which was held in Kunming, China, in October 2021.

In October 2022, the firm became the U.S. public relations agency of record for Glanbia Performance Nutrition. In 2023, the company was chosen by Costa Coffee to improve consumer communications across the UK. Costa Coffee had 2700 stores across the UK and 1100 outlets in 45 countries. Hill & Knowlton Strategies was also selected to provide PR and social media for Hill's Pet Nutrition.

From 2021 to 2023, Hill & Knowlton grew more than 25%. In September 2022, the firm acquired JeffreyGroup. The company is based in Miami but has offices in Mexico, Brazil, and Argentina. This expanded Hill & Knowlton's presence in Latin America, where it already owned Grupo Ideal, based in Brazil.

In March 2023, WPP acquired Germany based healthcare public relations agency 3K Agentur für Kommunikation.

In November 2023, Hill & Knowlton launched its global intelligence and technology unit. In the same month, Hill & Knowlton also announced its partnership with Pendulum Intelligence to produce a tool that will help clients combat disinformation.

== Current operations ==
The firms' clients reportedly represent fifty percent of Fortune 500 companies. The company serves a variety of industries including automotive, banking and finance, energy, governments, sports marketing, healthcare and pharmaceuticals, technology communications, consumer goods and services, food and beverage, and the travel, leisure, and tourism industry. The company has also worked with governing bodies, federations, and sponsors for every Olympic Games since the 2000 Summer Olympics in Sydney. They also worked on the World Health Organization-funded COVID-19 campaign.

== Recognition ==
From 2008 to 2012, Hill & Knowlton worked for the Special Court for Sierra Leone to draw attention to the court's work prosecuting war criminals in Sierra Leone. The court was able to raise more than $12.5 million in financing to convict former Liberian president Charles Taylor. In 2013, the firm's work was included in PRWeek's list of "great work of the last 15 years".

== Controversies ==
Hill & Knowlton did public relations work for the tobacco industry in the 1950s and 1960s, the Bank of Credit and Commerce International from 1988–1990, at which point the firm stopped working for the bank after bank officials were convicted of money-laundering.

In the 1970's, Hill & Knowlton representatives were present in a meeting with the Public Relations Subcommittee of Johns-Manville's Environmental Health Task Force. After that meeting, the Asbestos Information Association, was formed (not by Hill & Knowlton), which denied the health risks of asbestos. Hill & Knowlton was also hired to address concerns with vinyl chloride and CFC.

Also during the late 1980s, Hill & Knowlton represented the Bank of Credit and Commerce International (BCCI) during its money laundering scandal. Hill & Knowlton's work was investigated by a U.S. Senate subcommittee, and allegations were made that the firm had pressured regulators to not investigate the bank, though no evidence was found to support the claims. After BCCI was convicted of money laundering, the firm severed their relationship with BCCI.

The company was hired in 1990 by Citizens for a Free Kuwait, a group predominantly funded by the Government of Kuwait, to assist its campaign for U.S. intervention in response to the invasion and annexation of Kuwait by Iraq. Hill & Knowlton were later accused of spreading false information to increase support for the Gulf War, which the company denied. Kuwait canceled its account with the firm before the start of the Gulf War.

Hill & Knowlton represented The Church of Scientology from 1987 until May 1991. The Church of Scientology sued the firm, claiming that their contract was terminated because Hill & Knowlton was pressured to do so by Eli Lilly and Company, a client of JWT. Eli Lilly and Company produce the drug Prozac, which the Church staunchly and publicly opposed. The matter was settled out of court.

In November 2022, the company, as official PR firm for the COP27 climate summit in Egypt, was criticized by scientists and environmentalists for also working for fossil fuel corporations.

The firm has worked for long-time Ugandan dictator Yoweri Museveni to improve the reputation of his regime after human rights organizations, such as Amnesty and Human Rights Watch, documented systematic repression in Uganda.
