= The Gypsy of Athens =

1922 film

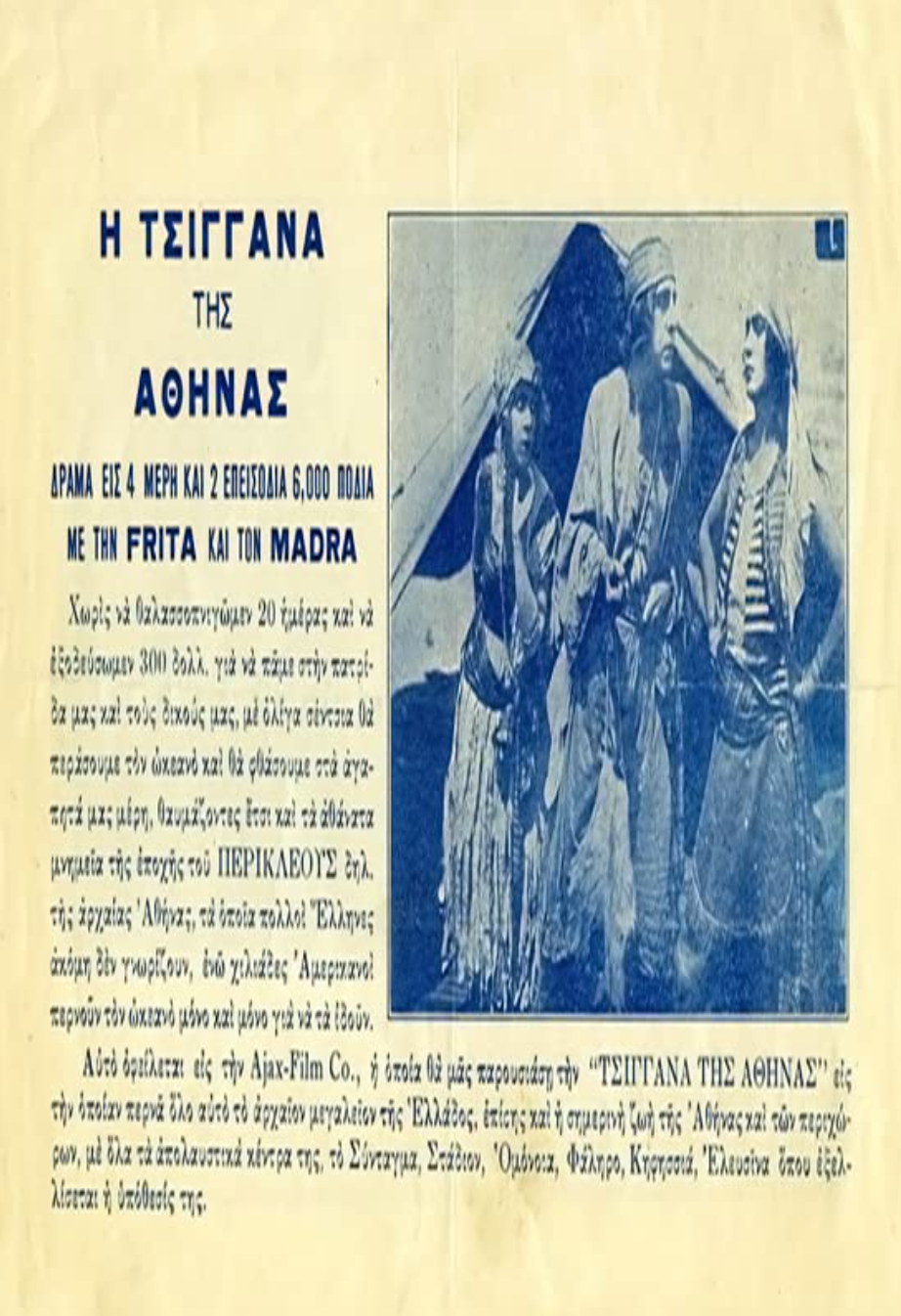
- Theatrical Poster
- Directed by: Ahilleas Madras
- Written by: Ahilleas Madras
- Starring: Ahilleas Madras; Frida Poupelina
- Cinematography: Joseph Hepp
- Production company: Agax Film
- Release date: 1922
- Country: Greece
- Languages: Silent; Greek intertitles

The Gypsy of Athens (Greek: Η τσιγγάνα της Αθήνας) is a 1922 Greek silent drama film directed by Ahilleas Madras. A gypsy falls in love with an American woman to the fury of his former lover.

It was a joint venture between Joseph Hepp and Ahilleas Madras. Madras was a theater actor and eventually married the lead actress from the film Gypsy of Athens, Frida Poupelina. Together they participated in the Viennese cinema. Madras went on to create additional films such as Maria Pentagiotissa in 1927 and The Wizard of Athens in 1931. The Wizard of Athens reused footage from the film Gypsy of Athens. The original film Gypsy of Athens is a lost film, but most of the film became The Wizard of Athens, which was preserved.

The film first premiered in Athens, Greece, on 1 October 1922 and had limited distribution in Greece. The film featured characters from the United States of America and was shown mainly in New York, Massachusetts, Connecticut, Rhode Island, and Chicago. Madras filmed footage of the Asia Minor catastrophe. Some of his footage was exhibited with the film as news footage. The footage featured The Commendation of the Americans, Exchange of Prisoners, The Destruction of Smyrna and The Tragic Exodus of the Refugees.

The film premiered on Broadway at the Times Square Theatre on 20 April 1924, but it was heavily censored by the New York State Film Commission. Some scenes were deemed indecent and inciting crime, namely close-ups of a dance on a rock, shots of belly dancing, a girl falling from a cliff, Venus emerging from the ocean, and the theft of a necklace from a girl unconscious inside a car. The scenes were cut in the U.S. version.

The New York screenings of the five-act film featured the accompaniment of a 20-piece orchestra conducted by Lucianos Kavadias and a baritone named Belgarino singing the gypsy love song of "Yar." That same year, screenings continued across the United States throughout the Greek communities in Bridgeport, Connecticut, Providence, Rhode Island, Boston, and Lowell Massachusetts.

== Plot ==
The film features images of Ancient Greek sites and was filmed in parts of Omonoia, Faliro, Elefsina, Kifissia and Syntagma Stadium. An American woman named Smale travels to Greece with her wealthy father from Chicago. Smale becomes enchanted with the country and decides to marry a Greek man. The story features images of the busy modern city of Athens in 1922. Smale throws a party to find a husband. One of the men plots to steal her necklace. She is kidnapped and thrown over a cliff. She is found by gypsies. Smale becomes a gypsy woman and falls in love with a gypsy leader named Yor. Yor is also a violinist and a singer. She begins to live among the gypsies in a gypsy encampment. Smale is lured by a wealthy industrialist and forgets about Yor. Yor is involved with another woman who competes with Smale for his love. Yor is banished from seeing Smale because of her rich industrialist husband. Yor tells Smale and they meet on the beach and tragically drown.

== The Gypsy of Athens vs. The Wizard of Athens ==
Most of the footage in the 1931 film The Wizard of Athens was taken from The Gypsy of Athens, released in 1922. Madras rebranded his silent film with new intertitles, changing the story around and introducing new footage. Cinema historians can find much of The Gypsy of Athens within the second film released nine years later. Madras completely changed the story which was centered around a wizard instead of a gypsy. The modernization of the two characters can be distinguished by the elaborate outfit worn by the wizard which is slightly different than the original gypsy's wardrobe. Madras was also ten years younger when they filmed the original movie. Carefully observing both films, the two films can be separated, but the intertitles were completely changed and lost forever.

== Cast ==
- Ahilleas Madras as Yor
- Frida Poupelina as Smale

== Bibliography ==
- Neubauer, John; Cornis-Pope, Marcel (2010). History of the Literary Cultures of East-Central Europe Junctures and Disjunctures in the 19th and 20th Centuries. Volume IV: Types and Stereotypes. Philadelphia, PA: John Benjamins Publishing Company. ISBN 9789027287861.
- Karalis, Vrasidas (2012). A History of Greek Cinema. London, UK: Continuum International Publishing. ISBN 9781441194473.
- Tsiapos, Argyris (2015). Οι Πρώτες Ταινίες του Ελληνικού Κινηματογράφου Η Ιστορία του Προπολεμικού Ελληνικού Σινεμά [The First Films of Greek Cinema The History of Pre-War Greek Cinema]. Athens, Greece: Serres Publishing. ISBN 978-960-93-7608-2.
- Rouvas, Angelos; Stathakopoulos, Christos (2005). Ελληνικος Κινηματογραφος: 1905-1970 [Greek Cinema: 1905-1970]. Athens, GR.: Hellenic Letters Publications (DOL). ISBN 9789604067770.
