= Empire Theatre (42nd Street) =

Movie theater in Manhattan, New York

AMC Empire 25
- Eltinge Theatre, Laff-Movie, Empire Theatre
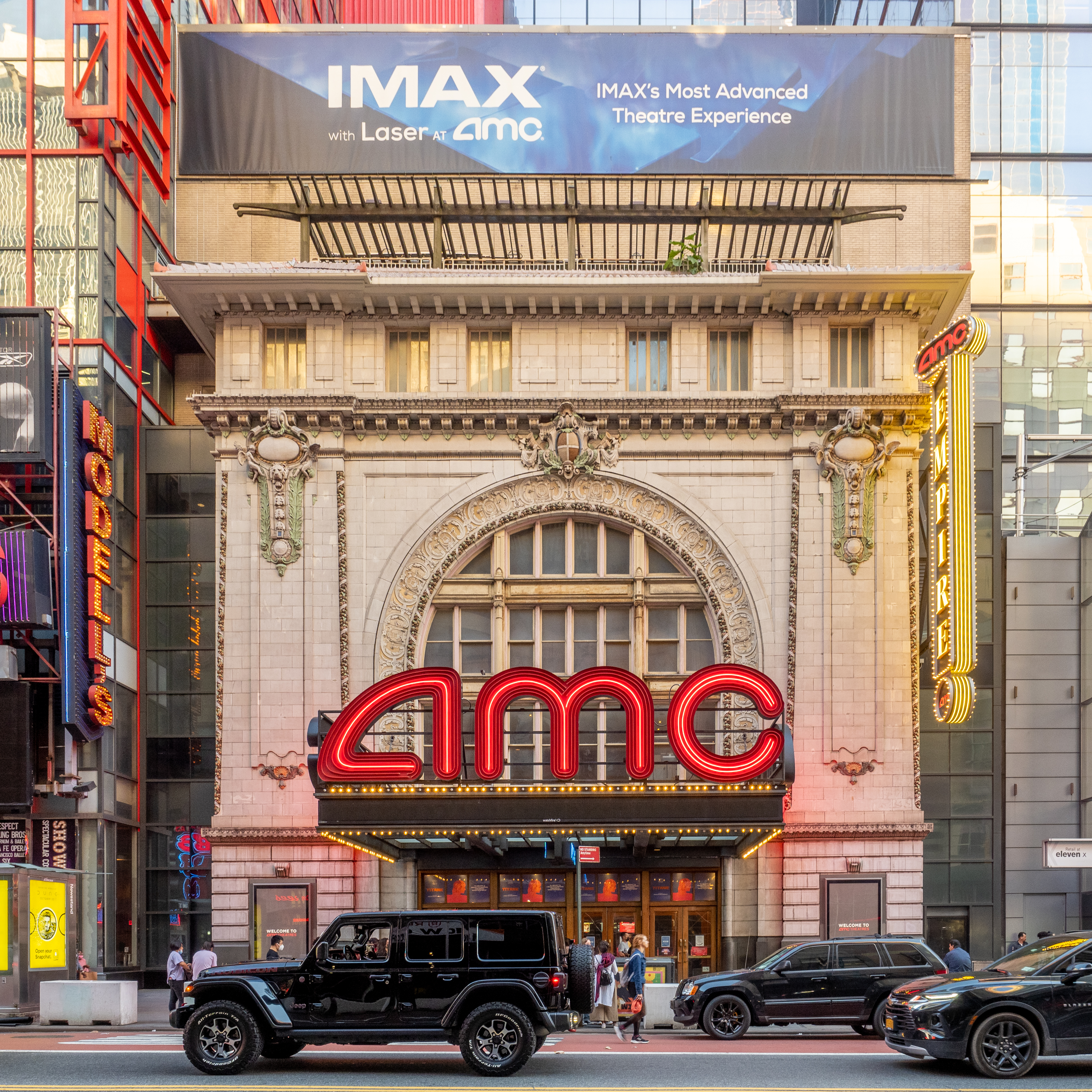
- The theater is still used as the lobby of the AMC Empire 25 multiplex movie theater.
- Interactive map of AMC Empire 25
- Address: 234 West 42nd Street; Manhattan, New York; United States
- Coordinates: 40°45′24″N 73°59′21″W
- Owner: City and State of New York
- Operator: AMC Theatres
- Capacity: 4,764 (multiplex) originally 750
- Type: Multiplex

Construction
- Opened: September 11, 1912
- Reopened: April 21, 2000
- Demolished: 1998 (original interior)
- Rebuilt: 1998–2000
- Years active: 1912–1931 (Broadway theater); 1931–1942 (burlesque); 1942 – c. 1980s (single-screen movie theater); 2000–present (multiplex)
- Architect: Thomas W. Lamb

Tenant
- New 42nd Street

Website
- www.amctheatres.com/movie-theatres/new-york-city/amc-empire-25

The Empire Theatre (originally the Eltinge Theatre) is a former Broadway theater at 234 West 42nd Street in the Theater District of Midtown Manhattan in New York City, New York, U.S. Opened in 1912, the theater was designed by Thomas W. Lamb for the Hungarian-born impresario A. H. Woods. It was originally named for female impersonator Julian Eltinge, a performer with whom Woods was associated. In 1998, the building was relocated 168 feet (51 m) west of its original location to serve as the entrance to the AMC Empire 25, a multiplex operated by AMC Theatres, which opened on April 21, 2000. This AMC theater has the most screens ever in the United States of America.

The facade of the Empire Theatre is made of terracotta and is square in shape, with relatively little ornamentation compared to other theaters of the time. The center of the facade contains a three-story arch, which was intended to resemble a Roman triumphal arch; a fourth story was used for offices. The theater had about 900 seats in its auditorium, spread across three levels. It was decorated with ancient Egyptian and Greek details, as well as a sounding board depicting three dancing women. Most of the original detail was restored when the theater building was repurposed in 1998. The former auditorium serves as a lobby and lounge for the AMC Empire 25.

Woods leased the site in August 1911, and the Eltinge Theatre opened on September 11, 1912, with the play Within the Law. In its early years, the Eltinge was known as a "lucky house", with many long-running plays. The theater was less successful during the 1920s and was leased to various theatrical personalities. During the Depression, when legitimate productions were scarce, the Eltinge was leased for burlesque by Max Rudnick from 1931 until 1942. Bud Abbott and Lou Costello, then burlesque comedians, first performed together at the Eltinge early in 1935. After its tenure as a burlesque house, the Eltinge became the Laff-Movie movie theater operated by the Brandt family and leased to J.J. Mage. The Brandts renamed the theater the Empire in 1954 and continued to present movies there until the late 20th century. The city and state governments of New York acquired the theater as part of the 42nd Street Redevelopment Project in 1990. Forest City Ratner developed an entertainment and retail complex on the site in the 1990s, relocating and renovating the Empire.

== Site ==
The Empire Theatre is on the south side of 42nd Street, between Seventh Avenue and Eighth Avenue near the southern end of Times Square, in the Theater District of Midtown Manhattan in New York City, New York, U.S. The theater was originally located at 236–242 West 42nd Street, but it has been moved 168 feet (51 m) west of its original location. The Empire's modern-day site was formerly occupied by the Lew Fields Theatre, which was demolished in 1997. The theater is part of an entertainment and retail complex at 234 West 42nd Street, which includes the former Liberty Theatre and the Madame Tussauds New York museum. The complex's land lot covers 54,060 square feet (5,022 m^{2}) and extends 200 feet (61 m) between its two frontages on 41st and 42nd Streets, with a frontage of 270 feet (82 m) on 41st Street and 350 feet (110 m) on 42nd Street.

The city block includes the Candler Building, New Amsterdam Theatre, and 5 Times Square to the east, as well as Eleven Times Square to the west. The E-Walk entertainment complex is directly across 42nd Street to the north. The Todd Haimes Theatre, Times Square Theatre, Lyric Theatre, New Victory Theater, and 3 Times Square are to the northeast. In addition, the Port Authority Bus Terminal is to the west, the New York Times Building is to the south, and the Nederlander Theatre is to the southeast. An entrance to the New York City Subway's Times Square–42nd Street and 42nd Street–Port Authority Bus Terminal stations, served by the 1, 2, 3, 7, <7>, N, Q, R, W, and S trains, is just west of the theater.

The surrounding area is part of Manhattan's Theater District and contains many Broadway theaters. In the first two decades of the 20th century, eleven venues for legitimate theatre were built within one block of West 42nd Street between Seventh and Eighth Avenues. The New Amsterdam, Harris, Liberty, Eltinge (now Empire), and Lew Fields theaters occupied the south side of the street. The original Lyric and Apollo theaters (combined into the current Lyric Theatre), as well as the Times Square, Victory, Selwyn (now Todd Haimes), and Victoria theaters, occupied the north side. These venues were mostly converted to movie theaters by the 1930s, and many of them had been relegated to showing pornography by the 1970s.

== Design ==
The Empire Theatre, originally the Eltinge 42nd Street Theatre, was designed by Thomas W. Lamb for the Hungarian-born impresario A. H. Woods. In the late 1990s, the former auditorium was converted into a lobby and lounge for a 25-screen multiplex operated by AMC Theatres. Known as the AMC Empire 25, it was AMC's first theater in New York City. The AMC Empire 25 complex was designed by a joint venture between Benjamin Thompson, Beyer Blinder Belle, Gould Evans Goodman, and the Rockwell Group. The Empire 25 is part of a larger retail and entertainment complex on the south side of 42nd Street, which covers 335,000 square feet (31,100 m^{2}). The theater itself covers 140,000 square feet (13,000 m^{2}) and was New York City's largest multiplex movie theater at the time of its construction.

=== Facade ===
The square facade of the Empire Theatre is made of terracotta and has little ornamentation compared with other theaters built around the same time. The center of the facade contains a three-story arch, which originally illuminated the rear of the auditorium. The arch was intended to resemble a Roman triumphal arch. It is surrounded by an ornately carved frame. The outermost sections of the facade are slightly projecting piers, which flank the arch. According to Christopher Gray of The New York Times, the facade was typical of Lamb's 1910s theater designs, which "emphasized broad swaths of cream- or white-colored glazed terra cotta with a bit of polychromy and deep dramatic piers, window recesses and other large elements".

In the original design, there were four pairs of doors at ground level, underneath a steel-and-glass marquee that protruded onto the sidewalk. Both the entrance and the stage door were on 42nd Street, in contrast to other theaters along the same block (including the New Amsterdam and Harris), which had their stage doors on 41st Street. On either side of the main entrance, the lowest section of the ground-level facade contained a granite water table, above which were doorways set within a rusticated stone facade. The original water table was removed when the theater was relocated in 1998. The second and third floors are mostly devoid of ornamentation. The center of the arch is topped by a cartouche, and the outer piers also contain cartouches at the third story. A carved cornice runs above the third story.

The fourth story contains six recessed rectangular windows, which overlooked the offices of the theater's manager A. H. Woods and his brother Martin Woods. The theater was topped by a mansard roof. By 1993, the original facade had become so dilapidated that Columbia Pictures covered the original facade with a stucco-and-plywood replica for the film The Last Action Hero. The modern multiplex contains a five-story glass facade that rises above the original Empire Theatre's facade.

=== Interior ===
The superstructure of the theater is composed of a steel frame with brick walls measuring 18 inches (460 mm) thick. The Eltinge Theatre could not contain interior columns because they would obstruct audience members' sightlines, so the side walls and the ceiling were designed to be stronger and more rigid than in a conventional building. Above the auditorium was Woods's office, which had green carpets and walnut-paneled walls.

==== Original design ====
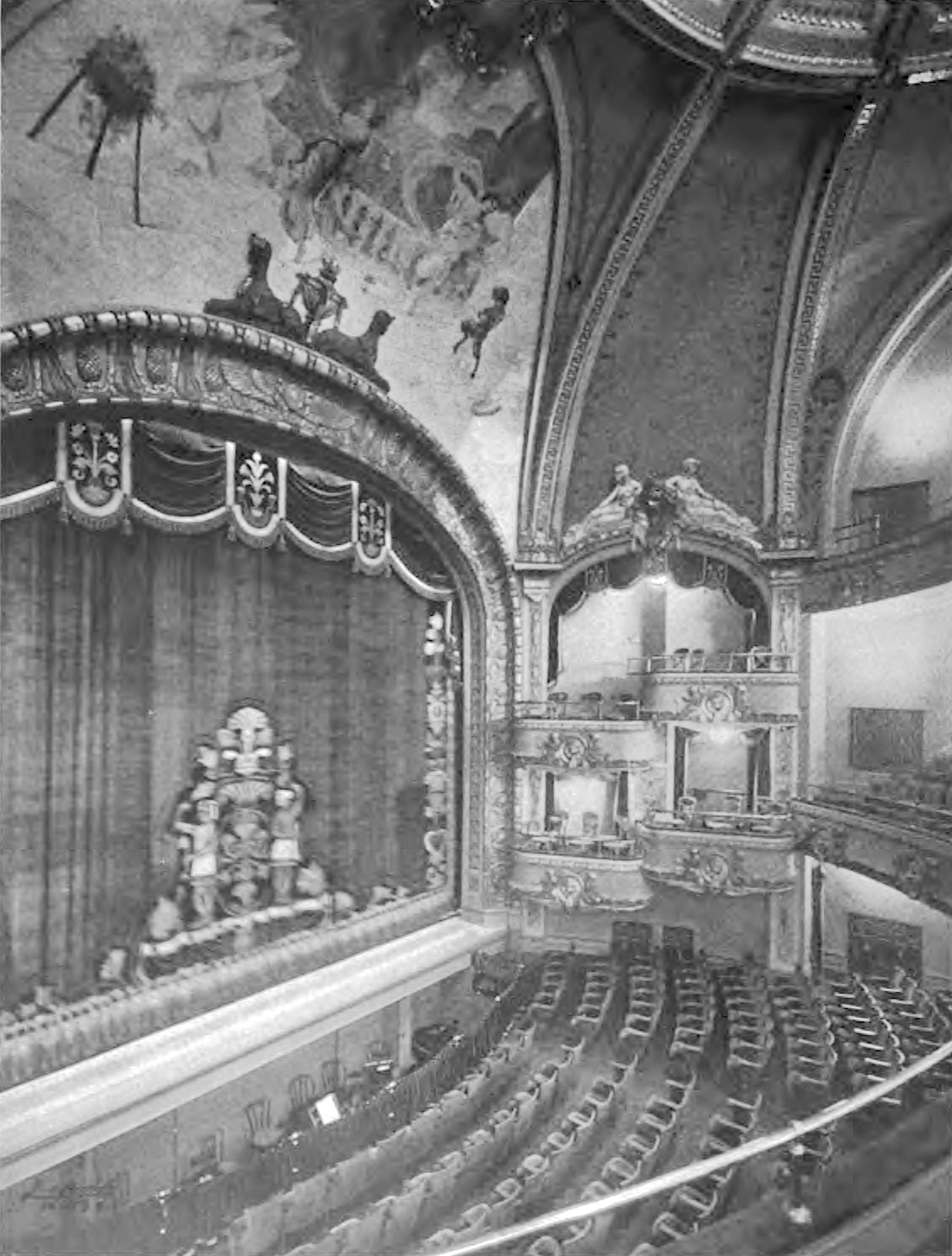
Interior of the Eltinge Theatre in 1912

The theater had 750 seats on three levels. These were proportioned in "slender", "medium", and "stout" widths for patrons of different sizes. The side walls were steeply angled to give the impression that the auditorium was larger than it actually was. The auditorium was decorated with ancient Egyptian and Greek details. These included a proscenium arch decorated with sphinxes and winged disks. The proscenium was flanked by smaller arches, each of which contained two levels with two boxes each. The boxes stepped down toward the stage, and the fronts of each box were decorated with sculpted medallions, flanked by sculpted figures. The boxes were removed in the 1930s when the theater was converted into a burlesque venue.

The sounding board above the proscenium arch contained a mural, which depicted three robed women dancing to music and was painted by French artist Arthur Brounet. According to The New York Times, the women depicted in the mural may have been based on different outfits Eltinge wore. The auditorium contains a domed ceiling. There was originally a chandelier hanging from the center of the ceiling, but it was removed in the 1930s.

==== Current design ====
When the theater building was repurposed in 1998, the steeply-raked balcony levels were replaced with mezzanines that contained restaurants. Escalators pass through the former proscenium arch to the newer multiplex screens above. There are three levels of lobbies, which lead to the screening rooms. The former auditorium comprises the first two stories, while the concession stand is on the third story. The movie screens are spread across five stories, connected by 14 escalators. The multiplex contains an additional six mezzanines, which are connected by elevators. In addition to the proscenium arch, other decorative details remain intact within the multiplex's lobby. A portion of the AMC multiplex is located on a truss above the original Empire Theatre building, which measures 20 feet (6.1 m) deep and is placed 60 feet (18 m) above ground level.

The screening rooms originally had 4,916 seats in total, although this had been reduced to 4,764 seats by 2011. Each of the 25 rooms contains a curved screen spanning the width of the room. The rooms contain stadium seating, with each row being 18 inches (460 mm) higher than the one in front of it. The rooms each contain up to 600 seats. On the sixth story are seven smaller screens, which are used for independent, foreign-language, and art films. Two of the screening rooms include leather seats, which were intended for large gatherings such as business presentations and private parties. In addition, there is a private 60-seat screening room that can be rented out for events. In total, the multiplex had 34 plasma screens and seven projectors when it opened; some of the screens were located within the lobby. When the theater opened, all of its screening rooms contained digital audio systems.

== History ==
Times Square became the epicenter for large-scale theater productions between 1900 and the Great Depression. Manhattan's theater district had begun to shift from Union Square and Madison Square during the first decade of the 20th century. From 1901 to 1920, forty-three theaters were built around Broadway in Midtown Manhattan. Furthermore, A. H. Woods and American actor Julian Eltinge signed a contract in 1909, wherein Woods acted as Eltinge's manager for seven years. Both men earned several hundred thousand dollars from the contract. Eltinge, who gained fame as a female impersonator, never performed there.

=== Legitimate shows ===
==== 1910s ====
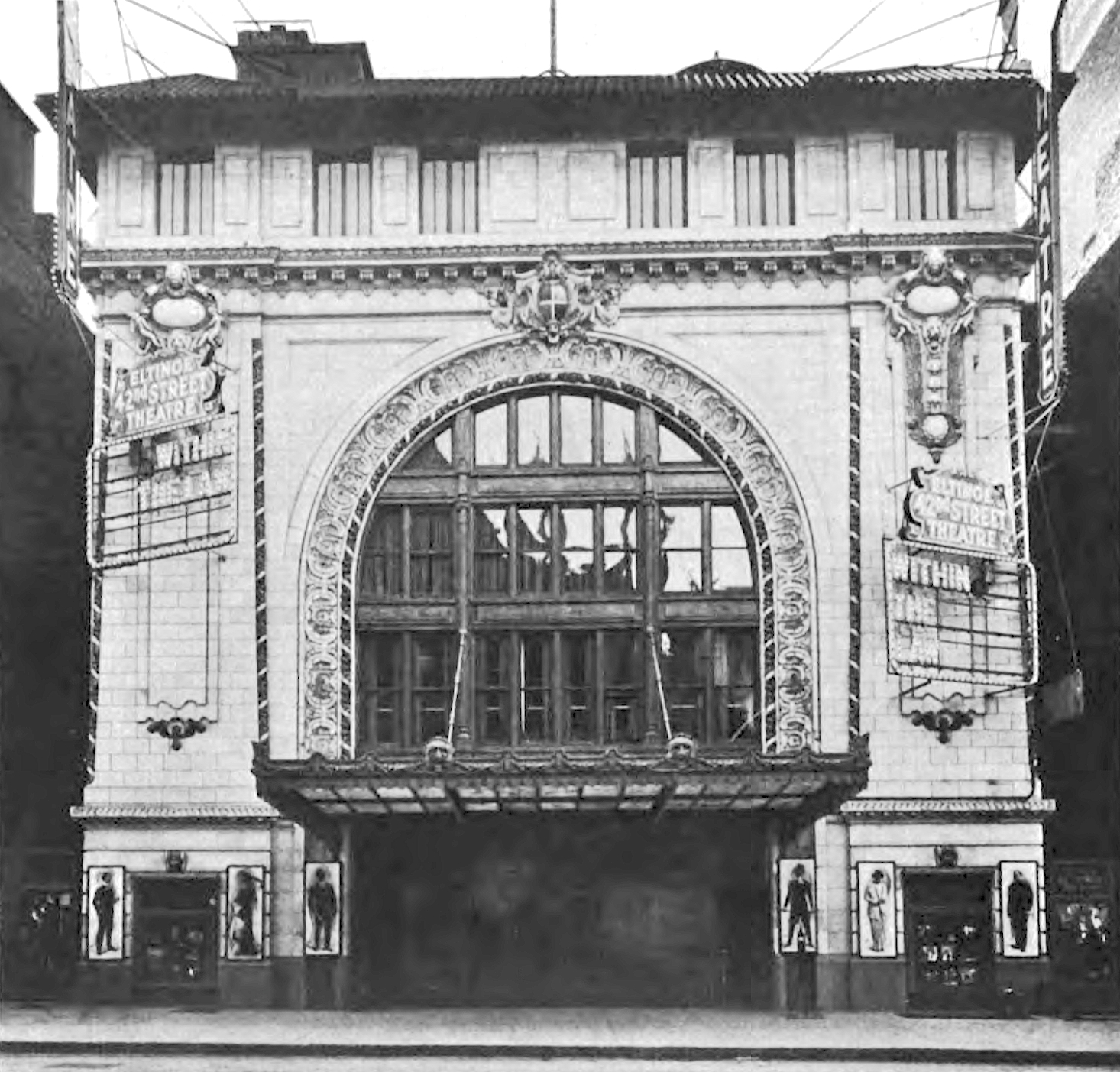
The facade as seen in 1912, shortly after the theater opened

In August 1911, Woods announced that he had signed a 21-year lease for an 80-by-100-foot (24 by 30 m) plot just west of the Liberty Theatre. Woods planned to build a 1,000-seat theater named in honor of Julian Eltinge. It would be the eighth theater to be constructed on 42nd Street, after the New Amsterdam, Liberty, Harris, American, Lyric, Republic, and Victoria theaters. The George A. Just Company received the contract for the theater's structural steel, while the Fleischmann Brothers received the general construction contract. By January 1912, Variety magazine reported that the Eltinge Theatre was nearly completed and was ready to open that April. Woods moved his executive offices from the Putnam Building to the entire upper floor in August 1912.

The Eltinge Theatre opened on September 11, 1912, with Bayard Veiller's melodrama Within the Law. The drama had previously been successful in Chicago, and it ran at the Eltinge for 541 performances through the end of 1913. Many of the Eltinge's early productions were similarly successful. The next hit at the Eltinge was the play The Yellow Ticket, featuring Florence Reed and John Barrymore, which opened in January 1914 and ran for 183 performances. Later the same year, Edward Sheldon's play The Song of Songs opened at the Eltinge, running for six months. The theater also hosted Fair and Warmer, which opened in December 1915 and transferred to the Harris Theatre after seven months. The Max Marcin play Cheating Cheaters opened at the Eltinge in August 1916, with 286 performances over the next several months. Within five years of its opening, the Eltinge Theatre was known as a "lucky house", in part because Woods often booked or produced popular comedies and melodramas.

The Eltinge screened films in early 1917, such as the documentary Birth and the educational movie Trip Through China. The same year, the Eltinge's stage was enlarged in advance of the 1917–1918 theatrical season. The theater's next hit was Business Before Pleasure, starring Barney Bernard and Alexander Carr, which ran from August 1917 to June 1918. This was followed by the play Under Orders, which opened in September 1918; it ran for several months despite having only two performers, in contrast to many contemporary productions that enjoyed large casts. The Eltinge also hosted Wilson Collison's Up in Mabel's Room, which opened in January 1919, and Collison and Avery Hopwood's The Girl in the Limousine, which opened the same October.

==== 1920s ====
The Eltinge did not host many long-lasting productions during the 1920s, likely because of the growing popularity of larger theaters and because Woods was busy producing other shows. With only 829 seats in 1919, the Eltinge was smaller than most of the area's other theaters. The play Ladies' Night, which opened in 1920, was the theater's first hit of that decade, running for nearly a year. In July 1921, Samuel Augenblick and Louis B. Brodsky bought the Liberty and Eltinge theaters from the heirs of Charlotte M. Goodridge, although this had no effect on Woods's lease. Later the same year, the theater hosted The Demi-Virgin, which transferred from the Times Square Theatre to finish its 268-performance run. The Demi-Virgin was the subject of a lengthy legal dispute regarding whether it was an "indecent" show, which Woods ultimately won. After The Demi-Virgin closed, most of the Eltinge's productions ran for fewer than 200 performances, including East of Suez in 1922 and The Woman on the Jury in 1923. One of the exceptions was Archibald and Edgar Selwyn's comedy Spring Cleaning, which opened in November 1923 and ran for seven months.

The firm of Mandelbaum & Lewine, along with Max N. Natanson, bought the Liberty and Eltinge theaters in November 1923 and immediately resold the theaters to Maximilian Zipkes. The Eltinge continued to host plays, although they were often not very popular. In early 1925, the theater hosted Leon Gordon's play The Piker, which was so negatively received that its leading performer, Lionel Barrymore, seldom appeared on Broadway again. That September, the Shubert brothers bought a 50-percent stake in Woods's lease. As part of the agreement, all productions staged at the Eltinge Theatre also had to be presented at one of the Shubert family's theaters. The Shubert family withdrew from the theater's operation in February 1926, leaving Woods with complete control over the house's bookings. By then, Woods was busy with other projects, having leased the Martin Beck Theatre and owning a half-stake in the Broadhurst Theatre. In the mid-1920s, Woods continued to produce short-lived plays at the Eltinge, which featured several young actresses. These included Stolen Fruit (1925) with Ann Harding, The Ghost Train (1926) with Claudette Colbert, and Crime (1927) with Sylvia Sidney.

Woods leased the Eltinge in March 1927 to Lester Bryant, who was sponsored by a group of wealthy men. By then, Woods was producing multiple large shows, which the theater's small capacity could not accommodate. The Lambert Theatre Corporation, a venture in which Bryant was a partner, leased the Eltinge during the 1927–1928 theatrical season, hosting seven shows in eight months. Louis I. Isquith leased the theater during mid-1928, presenting a series of plays with low ticket prices. Woods subsequently took back the theater's lease and produced the revue Blackbirds of 1928, which transferred from the Liberty and ran until June 1929. Following the Wall Street Crash of 1929, Woods produced several plays, which all had short runs. The play Murder on the Second Floor, featuring Laurence Olivier, opened in late 1929. This was followed the next year by Love Honor and Betray with Clark Gable; the Theatre Guild's production of A Month in the Country; and the play The Ninth Guest. The theater's last-ever legitimate show was First Night, produced by Richard G. Herndon, which closed in February 1931. By then, there were rumors that the Eltinge could be converted to a movie theater or burlesque house.

=== Burlesque ===
Woods sublet the Eltinge to Max Rudnick in February 1931. Rudnick converted the Eltinge into a stock burlesque theater, and launched his first burlesque shows there on March 6. The Eltinge was the second theater on 42nd Street to feature stock burlesque, following Minsky's Republic Theater (now the New Victory) which opened a month earlier. The Eltinge's conversion to burlesque was due in part to the Depression and in part to a general decline in the Broadway theater industry in the mid-20th century; from 1931 to 1950, the number of legitimate theaters decreased from 68 to 30.

The Eltinge and the Republic were financially successful by mid-1931, but local business owners opposed burlesque, claiming that the shows encouraged loitering and crime and decreased property values. In New York, theater licenses were subject to yearly renewal, and opponents of burlesque tried to have the licenses revoked. The nearby Republic and other theaters had been raided by police, but the publicity only boosted attendance. The Eltinge's operating license was temporarily revoked in September 1932, only to reopen the next month. The Eltinge toned down its shows whenever it was raided, but reverted to form soon after. By 1933, Rudnick had taken over the theater building, and Woods, who had continued to occupy the fourth-floor offices, relocated his office to the New Amsterdam.

After he was elected mayor in 1934, Fiorello La Guardia began a crackdown on burlesque and appointed Paul Moss as license commissioner. Rudnick, his assistant manager, and several performers were arrested on indecency charges in November 1934, but were ultimately exonerated. The Eltinge continued to operate as a burlesque house for several more years. However, after a series of sex crimes in early 1937, the La Guardia administration ordered all burlesque houses to remove the word "burlesque" from their marquees that June. The Eltinge continued to host burlesque performances, which were billed as "Follies". The theater operated without a permit for several weeks in late 1937 before its license was renewed at the end of that year. Even without the word "burlesque" on its marquee, the Eltinge remained popular, although it was only one of three remaining burlesque theaters in the city by 1940. Moss again refused to renew the Eltinge's operating license in early 1942, marking the permanent end of burlesque at the Eltinge.

=== Movie theater and decline ===
After the Eltinge's burlesque license expired, J. J. Mage leased the theater from the Brandts. Mage reopened the Eltinge as the Laff-Movie in July 1942, with 759 seats. The new name reflected the fact that it showed only comedic shorts and feature films. The Brandt family took over the Laff-Movie, along with the neighboring Liberty Theatre, in December 1944. By the mid-1940s, the ten theaters along 42nd Street between Seventh and Eighth Avenues were all showing movies; this led Variety to call the block the "biggest movie center of the world". The Brandt family operated seven of these theaters, while the Cinema circuit operated the other three. The Brandt theaters included the Selwyn, Apollo, Times Square, Lyric, and Victory theaters on the north side of 42nd Street, as well as the Laff-Movie and the Liberty Theatre on the south side. Several producers offered to stage legitimate productions in the Brandt theaters, but none of the offers were successful.

William Brandt said in 1953 that any of his 42nd Street theaters could be converted into a legitimate house within 24 hours' notice, but producers did not take up his offer. Brandt announced in August 1953 that he would renovate the Laff-Movie, showing feature films exclusively. The theater was renamed the Empire in 1954; the name had previously been used by a theater on 41st Street that had just been demolished. By the late 1950s, the Empire was classified as a "reissue house", displaying reruns of films and changing its offerings twice a week. Tickets cost 25 to 65 cents apiece, the cheapest admission scale for any theater on 42nd Street. The Empire and the other 42nd Street theaters operated from 8 a.m. to 3 a.m., with three shifts of workers. The ten theaters on the block attracted about five million visitors a year between them.

The 42nd Street Company was established in 1961 to operate the Brandts' seven theaters on 42nd Street. By the early 1960s, the surrounding block had decayed, but many of the old theater buildings from the block's heyday remained, including the Empire. Martin Levine and Richard Brandt took over the 42nd Street Company in 1972. At the time, the Empire was presenting "showcase films". The other six theaters showed a variety of genres, though Levine said none of the company's 42nd Street theaters showed hardcore porn. The Brandts' theaters had a combined annual gross of about $2 million and operated nearly the entire day. However, the area was in decline; the Brandts' theaters only had three million visitors in 1977, about half of the number in 1963. The Brandts' movie theaters on 42nd Street continued to operate through the mid-1980s, at which point the Empire was showing kung-fu and horror films.

=== Restoration ===
==== Preservation attempts ====
The 42nd Street Development Corporation had been formed in 1976 to discuss plans for redeveloping Times Square. The same year, the City University of New York's Graduate Center hosted an exhibition with photographs of the Empire and other theaters to advocate for the area's restoration. One plan for the site, in 1978, called for razing several buildings in the area, including the Empire, to create a park. Another plan, called the City at 42nd Street, was announced in December 1979 as part of a proposal to restore West 42nd Street around Times Square. Under the plan, five theaters would have been converted back to legitimate use, and the facades of three other theaters, including the Empire, would be restored. The Empire's small capacity made it unsuitable as a legitimate theater, so the interior was likely to be demolished and renovated into a restaurant. Mayor Ed Koch wavered in his support of the plan, referring to it as a "Disneyland on 42nd Street". Subsequently, Hugh Hardy conducted a report on 42nd Street's theaters in 1980. His report, in conjunction with a movement opposing the demolition of the nearby Helen Hayes and Morosco theaters, motivated the New York City Landmarks Preservation Commission (LPC) to survey fifty of Midtown Manhattan's extant theaters in the early 1980s.

The LPC started to consider protecting theaters, including the Empire Theatre, with discussions continuing over the next several years. While the LPC granted landmark status to many Broadway theaters starting in 1987, it deferred decisions on the exterior and interior of the Empire Theatre. Further discussion of the landmark designations was delayed for several decades. In late 2015, the LPC hosted public hearings on whether to designate the Empire and six other theaters as landmarks. The LPC rejected the designations in February 2016 because the theaters were already subject to historic-preservation regulations set by the state government.

==== Initial plans ====
The Urban Development Corporation (UDC), an agency of the New York state government, proposed redeveloping the area around a portion of West 42nd Street in 1981. The plan centered around four towers that were to be built at 42nd Street's intersections with Broadway and Seventh Avenue, developed by Park Tower Realty and the Prudential Insurance Company of America. (Note: The sites were: Northwest corner of 42nd Street and Seventh Avenue: now 3 Times Square; Northeast corner of 42nd Street and Broadway: now 4 Times Square; Southwest corner of 42nd Street and Seventh Avenue: now 5 Times Square; South side of 42nd Street between Seventh Avenue and Broadway: now 7 Times Square (Times Square Tower)) The Brandt family planned to submit a bid to redevelop some of the theaters they owned on 42nd Street. In June 1982, the Brandts' five theaters on the north side of 42nd Street were added to the redevelopment plan. Despite the Brandts' insistence that the Empire and Liberty theaters also be included in the redevelopment, the two theaters were leased to New York Mart Inc. as part of a separate plan. Ultimately, the 42nd Street Redevelopment Project was delayed for several years due to lawsuits and disputes concerning the towers.

The New York Mart plan consisted of a garment merchandise mart on Eighth Avenue between 40th and 42nd Streets, opposite Port Authority Bus Terminal. The project was to be completed by the Times Square Redevelopment Corporation, comprising members of the New York state and city governments. Under this plan, the Empire and Liberty theaters would be renovated, although the extent of the renovations was unclear. David Morse and Richard Reinis were selected in April 1982 to develop the mart, but they were removed from the project that November due to funding issues. Subsequently, the state and city disputed over the replacement development team, leading the city to withdraw from the partnership in August 1983. The state and city reached a compromise on the development team that October, wherein the mart would be developed by Tishman Speyer, operated by Trammell Crow, and funded by Equitable Life Assurance.

The Brandts leased all their movie theaters on 42nd Street, including the Empire, to the Cine 42nd Street Corporation in 1986. Cine 42nd Street subleased the theater to Sweetheart Theatres Inc., which screened pornographic movies. The Empire Theatre was still part of the mart project in 1987. Though the theater was tentatively slated to be used for fashion shows and other events, the city and state governments had not reached an agreement with private developers regarding the mart. The merchandise mart was ultimately never built; the northern part of the site became 11 Times Square, while the southern part became the New York Times Building.

In 1989, The Durst Organization acquired the leases to eight theaters in Times Square, including the Empire. It subsequently announced plans to renovate the eight theaters in February 1990. The New York state government acquired the theater sites that April via eminent domain. The city had planned to buy out the theaters' leases but withdrew after the 42nd Street Company indicated it would lease the theaters to another developer. Although Durst protested the move, a New York Supreme Court judge ruled that the sites could be acquired by condemnation. Government officials hoped that the development of the theaters would finally allow the construction of the four towers around 42nd Street, Broadway, and Seventh Avenue. Even though the Empire Theatre was abandoned, government officials continued to heat the theater to preserve the plasterwork. The exterior of the unused theater was used as the Pandora Theater for the film Last Action Hero in 1993. After Disney committed to restoring the New Amsterdam Theatre in 1994, most of the other theaters around 42nd Street were quickly leased.

==== Relocation and restoration ====
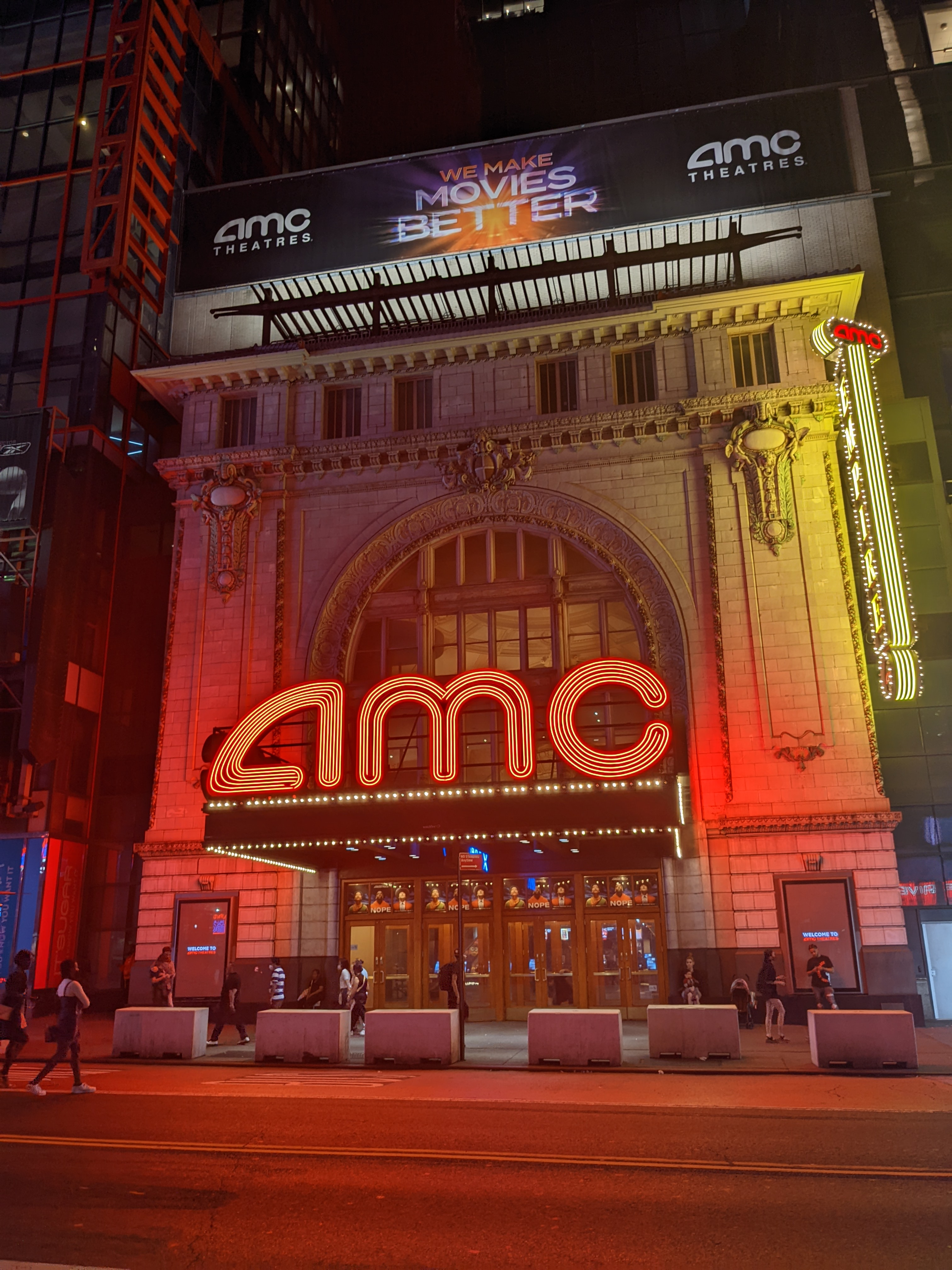
Seen at night

By 1995, real-estate development firm Forest City Ratner was planning a $150 million entertainment and retail complex on the site of the Empire, Harris, and Liberty theaters. Madame Tussauds and AMC leased space in the complex that July. Madame Tussauds would occupy the eastern section of the site, using the entrance of the former Harris Theatre; Bruce Ratner wanted to develop a similarly ornate gateway for AMC on the western end of the site. Forest City Ratner was not permitted to destroy or dismantle the Empire, which was protected by historic-preservation regulations. In June 1996, Ratner proposed relocating the theater 170 feet (52 m) westward at a cost of $1.2 million, using tracks to move the structure. AMC finalized its lease the same month. According to New 42nd Street president Cora Cahan, news articles about the proposed relocation were largely "filled [...] with wonder", in contrast to the mostly negative characterizations of Times Square. Urban Foundations was hired to relocate the building.

Engineers were preparing to raze several buildings along the south side of 42nd Street by mid-1997, including the Lew Fields Theatre, whose site would be occupied by the relocated Empire. The rear of the theater was braced because workers had to remove the stage and the fly systems, and the removal would undermine the building's structural integrity. Workers installed piles on the adjacent lots to the west, which had previously contained residences with basements. The basements were demolished, allowing the theater building to rest directly on Manhattan's bedrock instead of atop an unstable layer of dirt. There were 430 piles in total, which supported a set of eight parallel tracks. Workers also poured 70 concrete caps inside the theater building. After the tracks had been installed, workers placed a dolly of steel beams above the tracks, which in turn traveled above a series of 250 rollers. The perimeter of the dolly contained load-bearing beams that supported the weight of the theater. The lowest portions of the walls were removed, detaching the theater from the original foundations. The theater was then lifted about 1/8 inch (3.2 mm) so it could be hoisted onto the dolly. Workers used hydraulic jacks to lift the theater.

The theater's relocation required several months of preparation. The entire relocation was supposed to have occurred on February 17, 1998, but this was postponed because New York City officials wanted to perform the relocation on a weekend. As such, the structure was initially moved 30 feet (9.1 m) on February 22, while the rest of the relocation occurred during a five-hour period on March 1. Hydraulic jacks moved the theater in five-minute bursts, moving the theater about 5 feet (1.5 m) during each burst. Two large balloons representing Abbott and Costello, who first performed together at the theater in 1935, were rigged to appear as if they were dragging the theater westward. Large construction markers, referencing Abbott and Costello's "Who's on First?" comedy routine, were placed along the construction fence to mark the move's progress. Two portable heaters continued to heat the empty auditorium as it was being relocated. The event attracted several hundred spectators. Until 2022, (Note: The Palace Theatre, which weighed 7,000 short tons (6,200 long tons; 6,400 t), was raised by about 30 feet (9.1 m) from January to April 2022.) the 3,700-short-ton (3,300-long-ton; 3,400 t) structure was the heaviest building in New York City to have been relocated.

After the theater was relocated, Forest City Ratner planned to recreate stonework on the facade, which at several places had been stripped to a layer of brick. At the time of the relocation, its interior was in poor condition, with peeling paint and missing boxes, but the auditorium retained most of its plasterwork. The theater's facade was cleaned, while the interior was adapted to become the lobby of the AMC multiplex. Midway through the project, Forest City Ratner decided to add a 455-room hotel above the new entertainment and retail spaces to the east. The hotel was built atop a large truss, which in turn was supported by reinforced-concrete walls and eight large steel columns, since the hotel was structurally separate from the rest of the development. The large size of the steel columns required the architects to slightly reduce the size of the AMC multiplex.

=== Multiplex ===
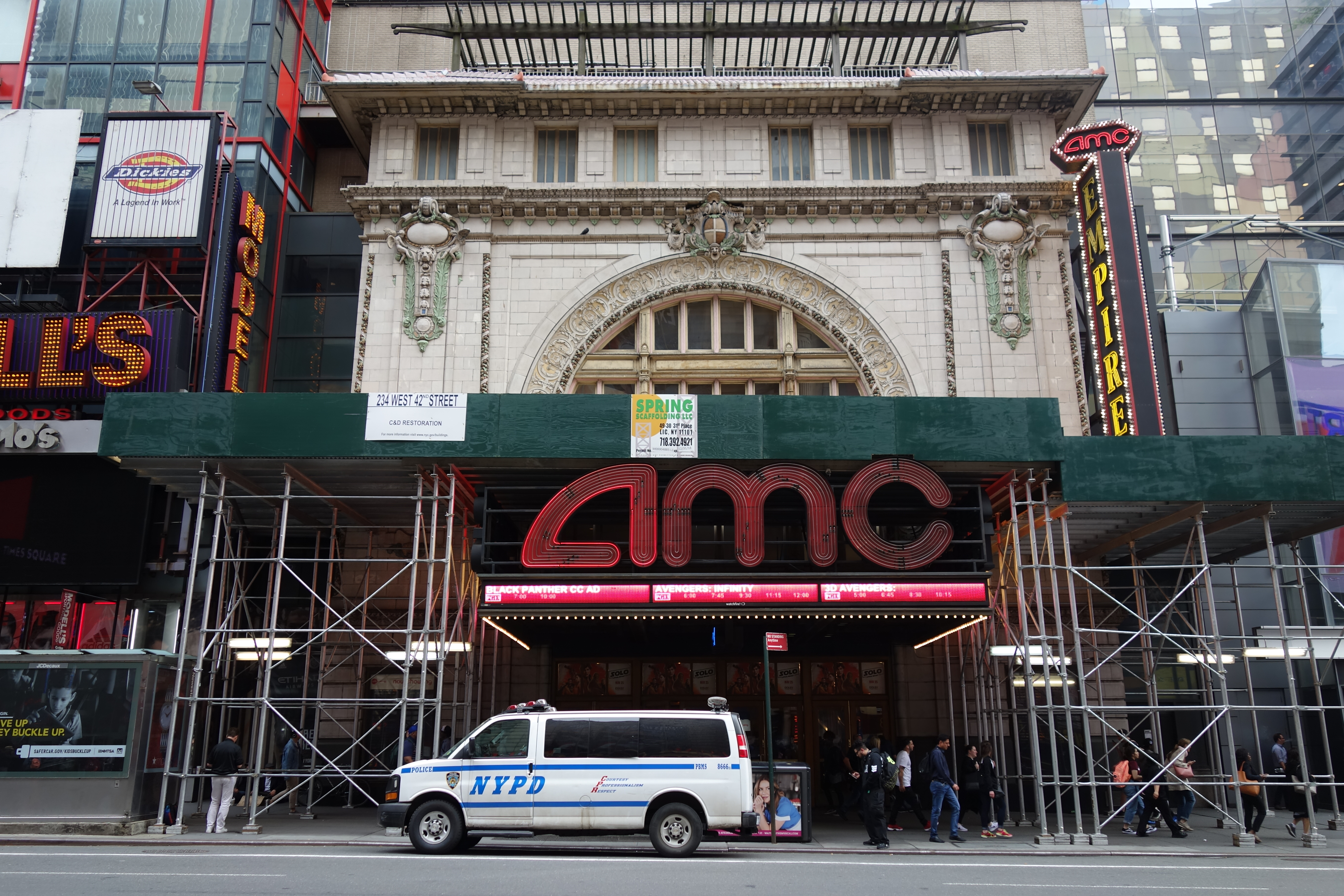
Seen with scaffolding around the marquee

The AMC Empire 25 opened on April 21, 2000, being the second multiplex to open on the block, after the E-Walk complex. Theatrical insiders claimed that the Empire 25 had cost $70 million, which might have made it the most expensive movie theater ever built, but AMC refused to disclose the construction cost. In its first year of operation, the Empire 25 struggled to compete with the E-Walk; it had not screened many major films in part because of a lack of successful feature films. By 2001, the Empire 25 had become one of the most popular in the world, grossing over $500,000 a week. The Times Square Cafe opened on the multiplex's balcony level in 2001 and later closed. The Hollywood Reporter, in 2005, quoted a Focus Features executive as saying that the Empire 25 was "one of the best art houses in the country". A digital IMAX screen, the first in New York City, opened at the Empire 25 in September 2008.

The multiplex remained one of the United States' most profitable movie theaters in the mid-2000s. It was especially popular on holiday weekends; for instance, it hosted 131 screenings of 14 separate films on Christmas Day in 2009. The Hollywood Reporter reported in 2011 that the Empire 25 had two million guests per year or an average of 40,000 guests per week. By contrast, the average multiplex in the United States had a third as many visitors. The Empire 25's success was attributed not only to its central location near Times Square but also because it offered independent and art films in addition to major features. Because of varying patronage throughout the week, the number of employees varied widely, from 20 workers on a typical weekday to nearly 140 during the summer. AMC also rented out the Empire 25's space for various events, such as a showcase of 3D films and an experimental-music festival.

The Empire 25, along with other movie theaters in New York state, was temporarily closed during much of 2020 due to the COVID-19 pandemic. The theater reopened in March 2021 after being dark for nearly a year. The Empire 25 remains AMC's flagship multiplex in the 2020s.

== Notable productions ==
Productions are listed by the year of their first performance. This list only includes Broadway shows; it does not include burlesque shows or films.

Notable productions at the theater
Opening year	Name	Refs.
1912	Within the Law	
1914	The Yellow Ticket	
1914	The Song of Songs	
1915	See My Lawyer	
1915	Fair and Warmer	
1916	Cheating Cheaters	
1919	Up in Mabel's Room	
1919	The Girl in the Limousine	
1920	Ladies' Night	
1921	Back Pay	
1921	The Demi-Virgin	
1921	Blood and Sand	
1922	East of Suez	
1923	The Woman on the Jury	
1923	Spring Cleaning	
1925	The Fall Guy	
1926	The Ghost Train	
1927	The Love Thief	
1929	Murder on the Second Floor	
1930	A Month in the Country	
1930	The Ninth Guest	

== See also ==
- List of Broadway theaters
