= Apollo Theatre (42nd Street) =

Former theater in Manhattan, New York

- New Apollo Theatre, Academy Theatre, Bryant Theatre
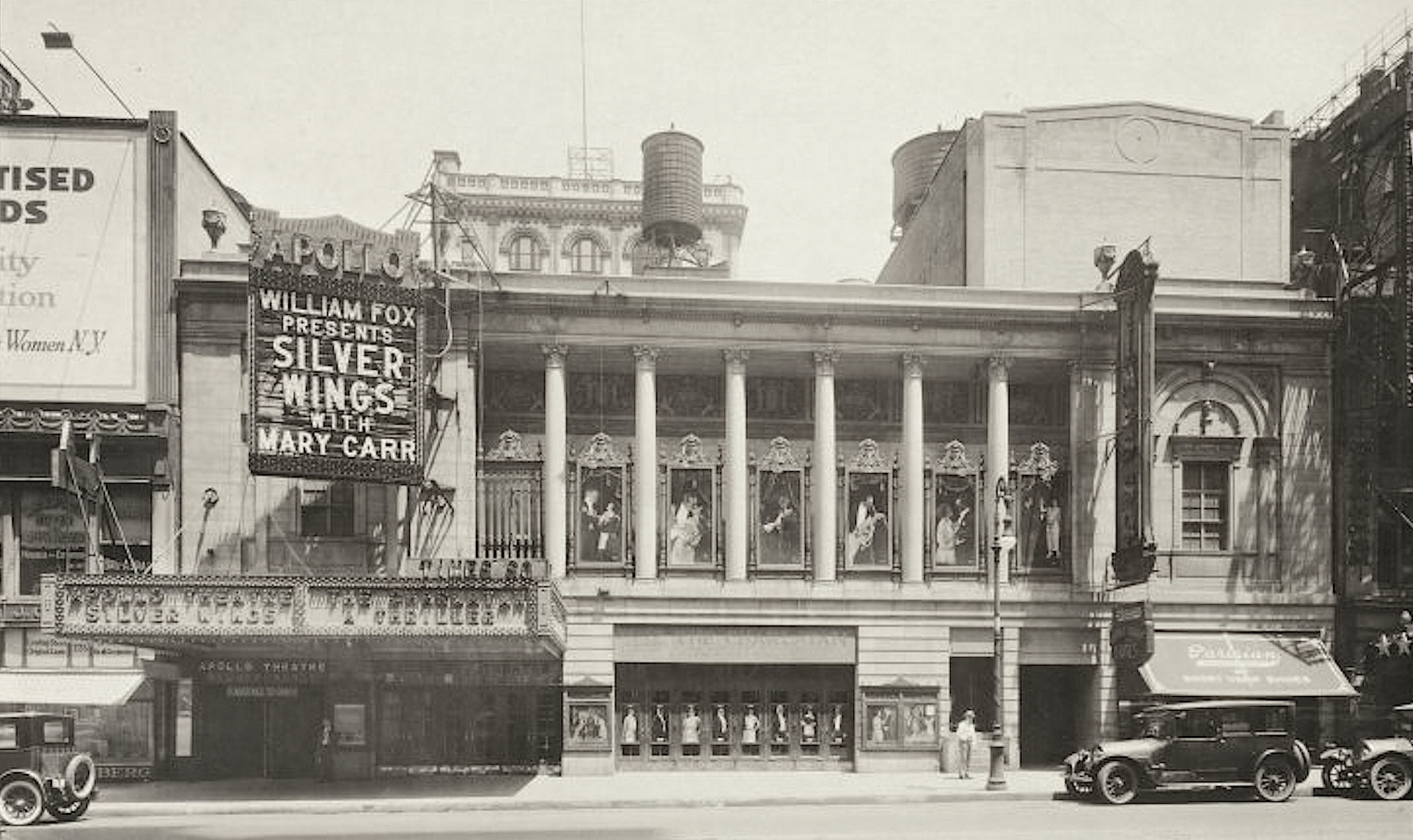
- 42nd Street entrances to the Apollo and Times Square Theatres in 1922. The auditorium of the Apollo is behind the Times Square.
- Interactive map of Apollo Theatre
- Address: 223 W. 42nd Street; Manhattan, New York City; United States
- Coordinates: 40.7569°N 73.9877°W
- Type: Broadway theatre
- Current use: Lyric Theatre

Construction
- Opened: November 17, 1920
- Demolished: 1996
- Years active: 1920–1990
- Architect: Eugene De Rosa

The Apollo Theatre was a Broadway theatre whose entrance was located at 223 West 42nd Street in Manhattan, New York City, while the theatre proper was on 43rd Street. It was demolished in 1996 and provided part of the site for the new Ford Center for the Performing Arts, now known as the Lyric Theatre.

== History ==
The Apollo was built in 1920 by the Selwyn Brothers in tandem with the Times Square Theatre, and both share a unified facade on West 42nd Street. Designed by Eugene De Rosa, the theaters had entrances on 42nd Street, but the Apollo's auditorium was actually on 43rd Street. The theater sat 1,200.

The Apollo was initially a musical theatre venue for such works as the Gershwin 1927 musical Strike Up the Band and several editions of George White's Scandals, featuring W. C. Fields, Bert Lahr and Ed Wynn. As with many other legitimate playhouses of the 1920s, movies were also screened; in 1922, for example, Silver Wings, Around the World With Burton Holmes, and two D. W. Griffith films, Orphans of the Storm and One Exciting Night, had engagements.

In 1934 the Apollo became 42nd Street's third stock burlesque house, joining Minsky's Republic three doors to the east and the Eltinge Theater across the street. Max Wilner and Emmett Callahan (who was married to star strip teaser Ann Corio), along with producer Allen Gilbert, presented "Glorified Burlesque," which was more refined than their neighbors. Abbott and Costello, Joey Faye, Ann Corio, Gypsy Rose Lee, Georgia Sothern, Mike Sachs, and Steve Mills appeared in burlesque shows at the theater. But after a unified outcry against burlesque by religious, business, and real estate interests in the late 1930s, the Apollo and the other theaters on 42nd Street became film venues. The Apollo ran foreign films for decades. By the 1970s, like many theaters on 42nd Street, the Apollo ran X-rated films.

In 1978 the Apollo was refurbished and renamed the New Apollo. Starting in 1979 it housed productions of On Golden Pond, Bent, Fifth of July, and The Guys in the Truck. But this venture failed in the early 1980s and the New Apollo ended its existence as a rock music venue called the academy. The building was neglected, fell into disrepair, and was condemned. In 1990 it was among several 42nd Street theatres repossessed by the City and State of New York, and in 1992 came under the protection of the New 42nd Street organization. Along with the neighboring Lyric Theatre, it was demolished in 1996.

Some of the theatre's architectural features, including the proscenium arch, which were protected by landmark status, were removed and later incorporated into the Ford Center for the Performing Arts, now the Lyric Theatre.

The exterior of the theatre is featured in HBO's series The Deuce.

== See also ==
- List of Broadway theaters § Demolished Broadway theaters
