= The Mirage (play) =

1920 play by American Edgar Selwyn

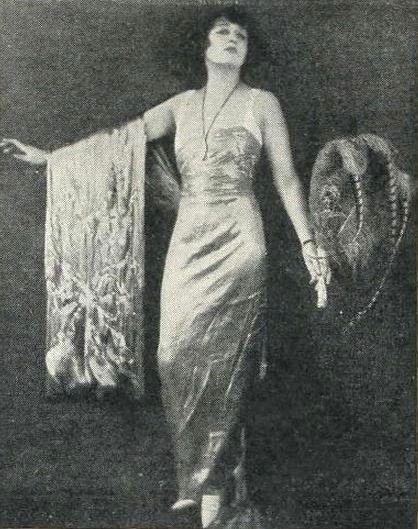
- Florence Reed in The Mirage, February 1921 issue of The Tatler
- Original language: English
- Written by: Edgar Selwyn

Premiere
- Date: 30 September 1920
- Place: Times Square Theatre

The Mirage is a play by Edgar Selwyn. It was the first play presented at the Times Square Theatre and debuted on September 30, 1920. It closed in March 1921 after 192 performances.

== Synopsis ==
Burns Mantle summarized the plot as follows in his 1920-21 Best Plays annual: "Irene Martin of Erie, Pa., comes to New York in search of work and a broader life. Falling in with the wrong crowd, she gives up the fight to be respectable and for seven years permits a traction magnate to maintain an apartment for her and help her care for the folks at home. By putting a Mrs. before her name she first convinces her family she is married, and later writes them she is a widow. Her Erie sweetheart, having got on in the world, comes to New York to get her. By this time she is tired of the life she is living and eager to return to Erie and respectability, but her sweetheart finds her out. She convinces him, however, that her reformation is complete and he is willing to overlook her past, but her traction magnate succeeds in planting a doubt in her mind that she will ever be able to stand Erie and its group after the magnificence and freedom she has been used to in New York. So she sends the Erie boy home to wait until she feels she is worthy to come to him."

In response to those questioning the plausibility of the plot, Selwyn said it was based on "not at all uncommon" situations in New York.

== Original Broadway cast ==
- Florence Nash as Betty Bond
- Mildred Whitney as Mack
- Florence Reed as Mrs. Irene Moreland
- Reginald Mason as Wallace Stuart
- Alison Bradshaw at Ruth Martin
- Catherine Proctor as Mrs. Martin
- William Williams as Chester Martin
- Alan Dinehart as Al Manning
- Bert J. Norton as William
- Wanda Lawrence as Mlle. Elise
- Helen Maginnis as Dolly McMann
- Malcolm Williams as Henry M. Galt
- William Bain as Stanley Northrup
- George Le Soir as Edward Godding

== Adaptations ==
The 1931 movie Possessed, starring Joan Crawford and Clark Gable, in an adaptation of the play. The 1924 silent movie The Mirage was also an adaptation.
