= Possessed (1931 film) =

1931 American film by Clarence Brown

- Directed by: Clarence Brown
- Screenplay by: Lenore J. Coffee
- Based on: The Mirage; 1920 play by Edgar Selwyn
- Produced by: Clarence Brown; Harry Rapf; Irving Thalberg
- Starring: Joan Crawford; Clark Gable; Wallace Ford
- Cinematography: Oliver T. Marsh
- Edited by: William LeVanway
- Music by: William Axt; Charles Maxwell; Joseph Meyer
- Distributed by: Metro-Goldwyn-Mayer
- Release date: November 21, 1931
- Running time: 76 minutes
- Country: United States
- Language: English
- Budget: $378,000
- Box office: $1.52 million

Possessed is a 1931 American pre-Code drama film directed by Clarence Brown, starring Joan Crawford and Clark Gable and released by Metro-Goldwyn-Mayer. The film is the story of Marian Martin, a factory worker who rises to the top as the mistress of a wealthy attorney. The screenplay by Lenore J. Coffee was adapted from the 1920 Broadway play The Mirage by Edgar Selwyn. Possessed was the third of eight film collaborations between Crawford and Gable.

== Plot ==
Marian Martin is a factory girl living with her mother in the working-class section of Erie, Pennsylvania. Factory boy Al Manning hopes to marry her, but Marian is determined to find a better life. When a train makes a stop in town, Marian looks through the windows and sees the wealthy passengers. She then meets train passenger Wally Stuart, a New Yorker who gives her champagne and offers his address, inviting her to contact him if she should visit New York. On returning home, an inebriated Marian tells Al and her mother that she had been drinking by the railroad tracks.

Al, who had been waiting for Marian and accuses her of being drunk, spots the piece of paper containing Wally's address in her hand, grabs it and tears it into pieces. He tells Marian that her actions are inappropriate and that she must stay with him. Marian angrily tells Al and her mother that no one owns her and that her life belongs to herself. She collects the torn paper shreds from the floor and pastes them together before leaving for New York City. When she arrives, she visits Wally, who offers her advice on meeting and keeping wealthy men. Marian uses the advice to begin a relationship with Wally's friend Mark Whitney, a wealthy divorced attorney.

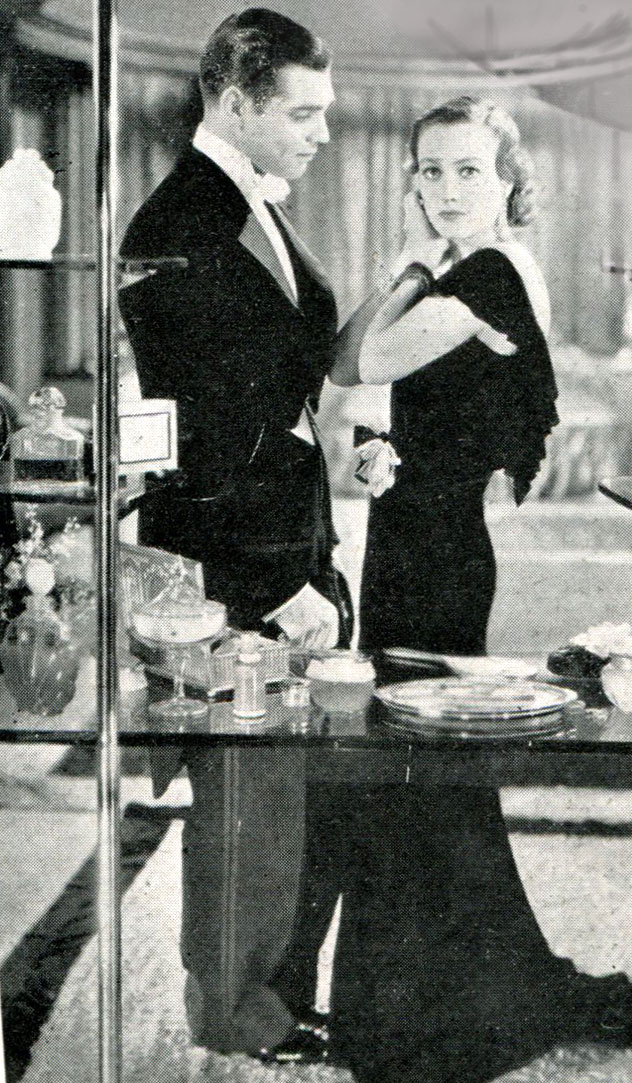
Gable and Crawford

Marian becomes Mark's mistress and he provides her with a complete makeover, educating her in the arts and culture of his social set. Three years pass and the two are happily in love. To cover the fact that Marian is his kept woman, Mark presents Marian as Mrs. Moreland, a wealthy divorcée living comfortably on her alimony.

Some time later, Al, now running a prosperous cement business, comes to the city hoping to land a big contract. He sees Marian and asks her to marry him, but she refuses. When he learns that Marian is a "friend" of Mark, Al—unaware of Marian and Mark's true relationship—hopes that he can use Mark to secure the contract.

When Mark runs for gubernatorial office, friends caution him that his relationship with Marian is a serious liability. When she overhears Mark talking with some politicians, she learns that he now plans to marry her even though their relationship will cause a scandal. To support his gubernatorial bid, she lies to Mark, telling him that she no longer loves him and that she intends to marry Al instead. Marian tells Al the truth, but he rebuffs her, saying that he could never marry such a woman. He changes his mind when he realizes that by rejecting Marian, he is also jeopardizing the highway contract. He begs her to "square things" between him and Mark, promising to marry her after all, but she sends him away in disgust.

A political rival learns of Marian's true identity and makes plans to leak the information at Mark's political rally. At the rally, Mark's political rivals drop shards of paper from the auditorium ceiling reading "Who is Mrs. Moreland?". Mark appears worried and does not know how to respond. As the crowd rumbles, Marian emerges from the audience and informs the crowd that she is Mrs. Moreland and that Mark has always been an honorable man, one who once belonged to her but now belongs to them. The crowd cheers as she leaves, sobbing. Outside, Mark tells her that they will be together no matter what may occur, and legitimizes their relationship by proposing marriage.

== Cast ==
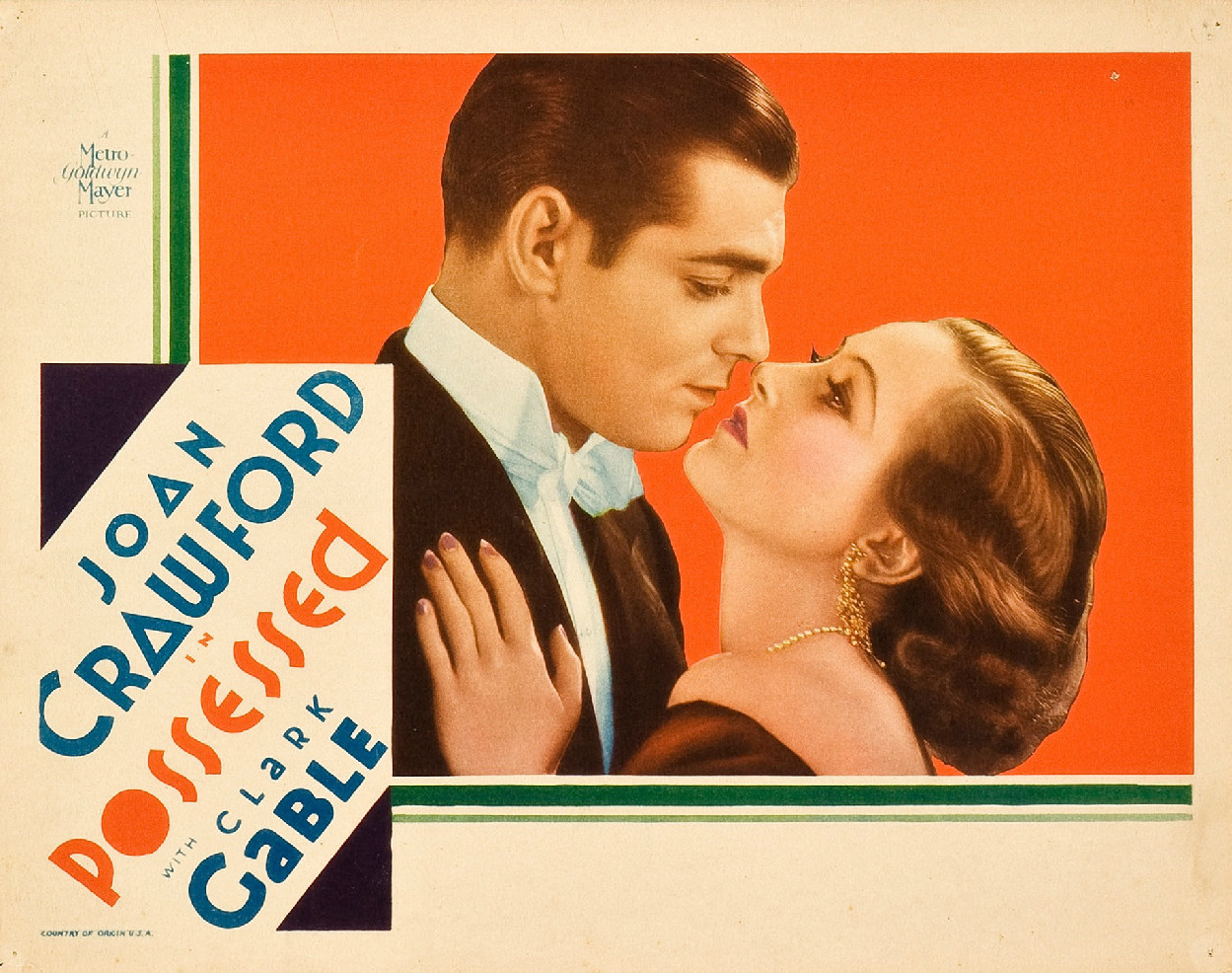
Lobby card

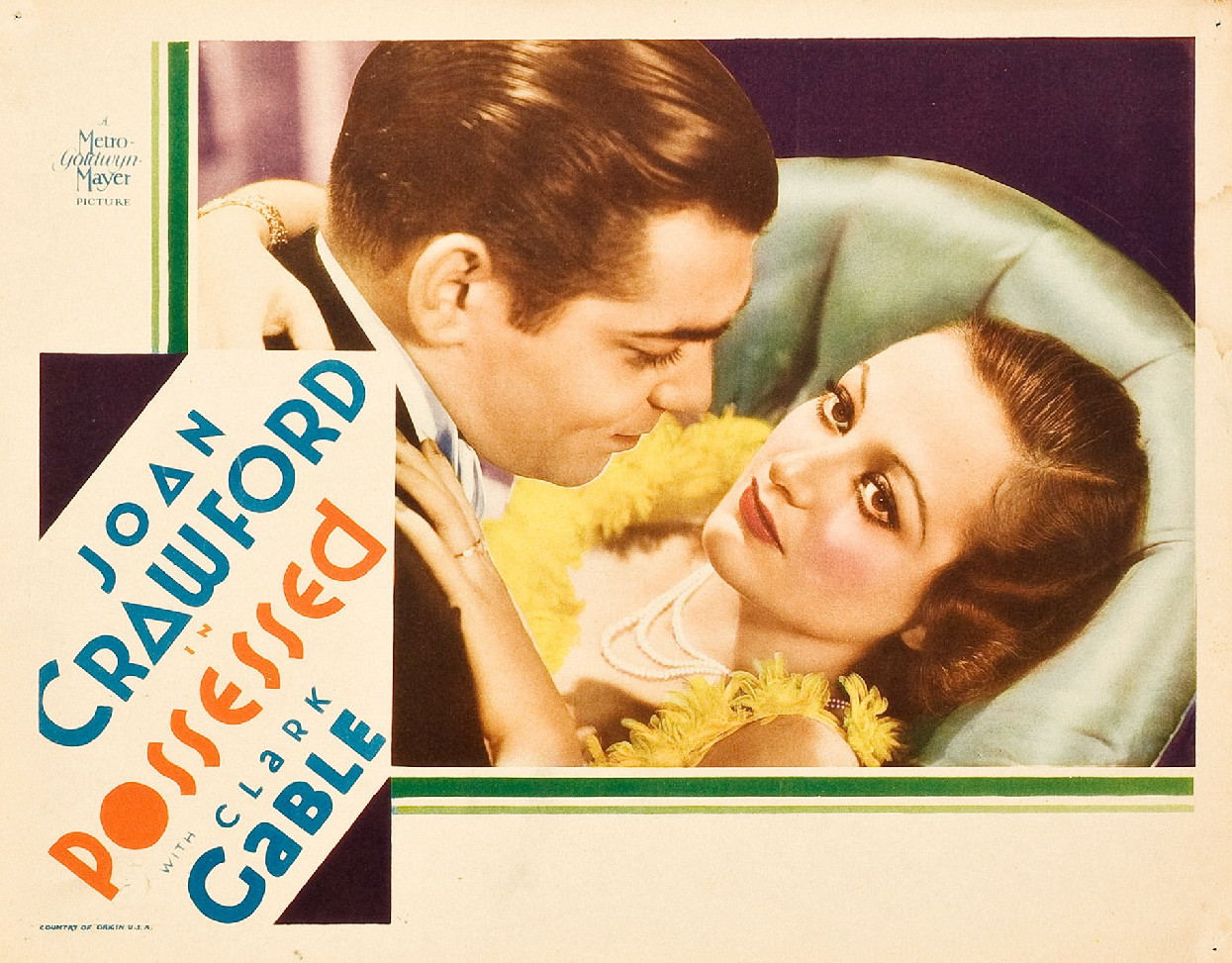
Lobby card

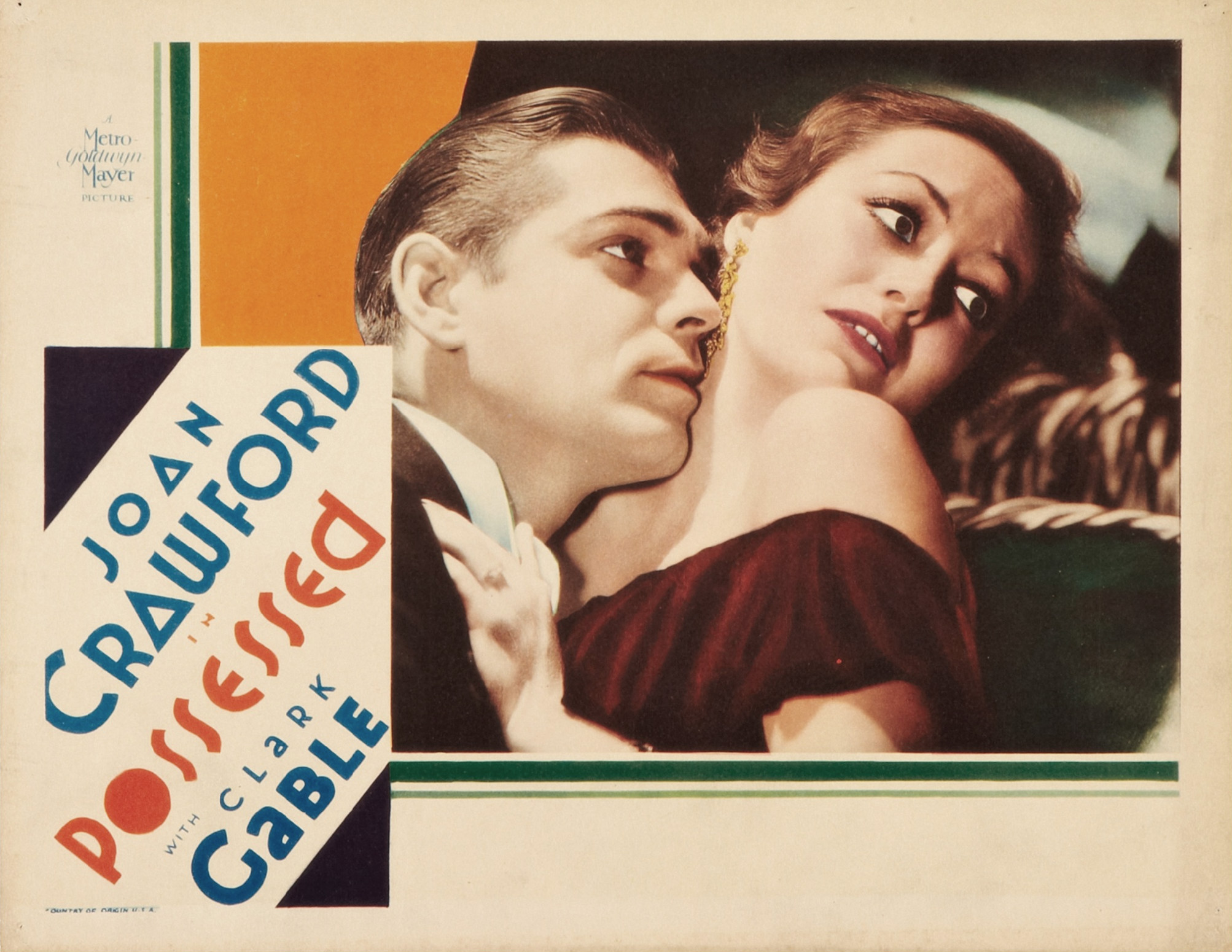
Lobby card

- Joan Crawford as Marian Martin
- Clark Gable as Mark Whitney
- Wallace Ford as Al Manning
- Richard "Skeets" Gallagher as Wally Stuart (billed as Skeets Gallagher)
- Frank Conroy as Horace Travers
- Marjorie White as Vernice LaVerne
- John Miljan as John Driscoll
- Clara Blandick as Marian's mother

Uncredited Cast

- Norman Ainsley as Ambrose - Wally's Butler
- Jack Baxley as 'League of Nations' Heckler
- Wade Boteler as 'Answer That One' Heckler
- Clarence Brown as Man on Merry-Go-Round
- André Cheron as Monsieur Lavell - Party Guest
- Gino Corrado as Signor Martini - Party Guest
- Phyllis Crane as Undetermined Secondary Role
- Jean Del Val as Waiter
- Florence Enright as Undetermined Secondary Role
- Bess Flowers as Party Guest
- Francis Ford as Drunken Husband
- Mary Gordon as Woman at Political Rally
- James T. Mack as Elevator Operator
- Fred Malatesta as Party Waiter
- Alphonse Martell as French Waiter
- Wilfred Noy as Bertram - Mark's Butler
- Jack Pennick as 'Parole for Convicts' Heckler
- Ruth Renick as Undetermined Secondary Role
- Joan Standing as Whitney's Secretary
- Larry Steers as Party Guest
- Barbara Tennant as Undetermined Secondary Role
- Wilhelm von Brincken as Baron von Bergen - Party Guest
- Walter Walker as Whitney for Governor Supporter

== Production ==
Leonore Coffee, who wrote the script, said she was assigned to write the film by Irving Thalberg, who instructed the writer to give Joan Crawford "a new personality" to play after years of depicting flappers. "I gave Joan Crawford a whole new personality," said Coffee. "It was a very successful picture. Thalberg said to me once, “The only trouble is, she’s been playing it [the same character] ever since"."

== Reception ==
Critic Mordaunt Hall, writing for The New York Times, liked the film and the direction of Clarence Brown. Hall wrote:

Through Clarence Brown's able direction, handsome settings and a fairly well-written script, "Possessed,"... is a gratifying entertainment. ... The familiar theme of a small-town factory girl who becomes the mistress of a wealthy New Yorker is set forth with new ideas which result in surprises, if not in a measure of suspense.

=== Box office ===
According to MGM records, the film earned $1,030,000 in the U.S. and Canada and $492,000 elsewhere, resulting in a profit of $611,000.
