= The Mirage (1924 film) =

1924 film directed by George Archainbaud

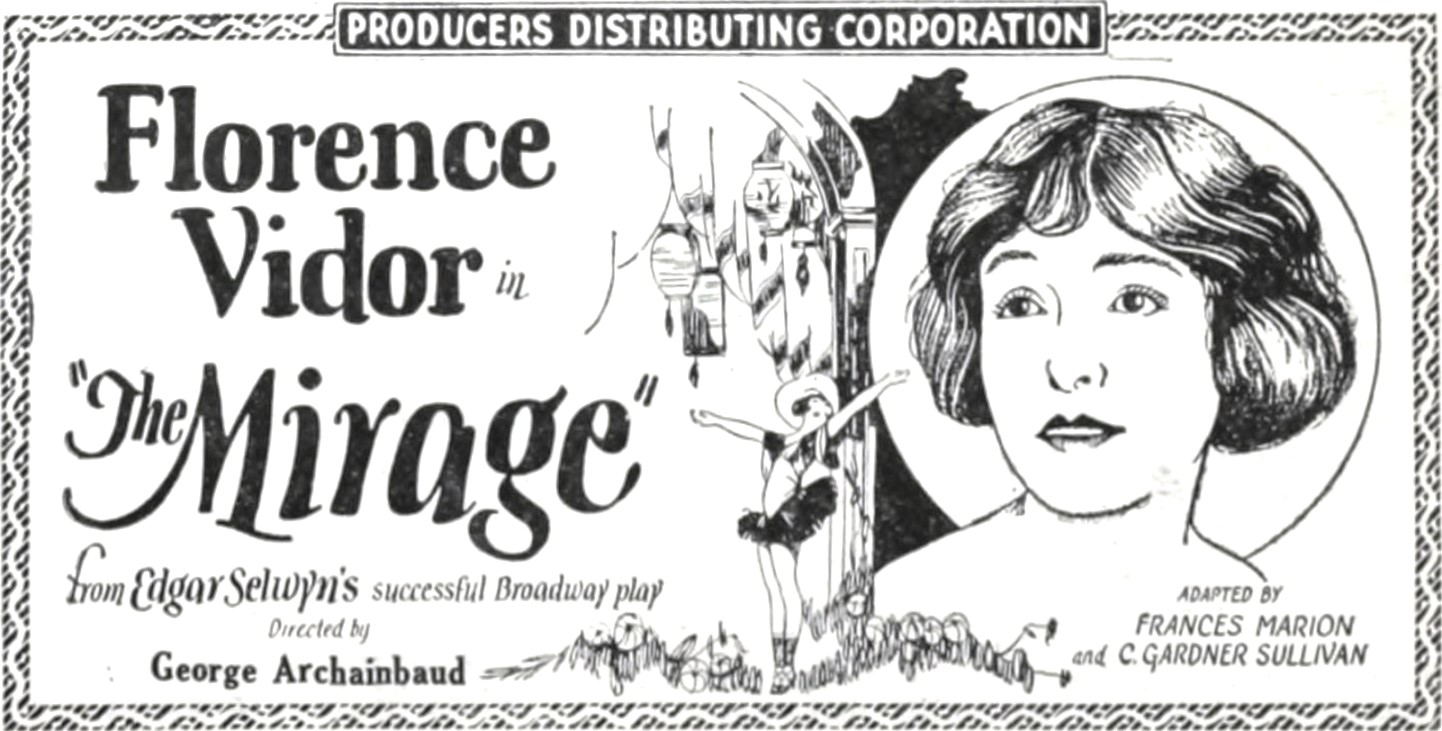
- Advertisement
- Directed by: George Archainbaud
- Written by: C. Gardner Sullivan
- Based on: The Mirage by Edgar Selwyn
- Produced by: Thomas Ince; Regal Pictures
- Starring: Florence Vidor
- Cinematography: Henry Sharp (French)
- Distributed by: Producers Distributing Corporation (PDC)
- Release date: December 28, 1924
- Running time: 6 reels
- Country: United States
- Language: Silent (English intertitles)

The Mirage is a 1924 American silent comedy film directed by George Archainbaud and starring Florence Vidor. It was adapted from the 1920 play of the same name by Edgar Selwyn.

== Cast ==
- Florence Vidor as Irene Martin
- Clive Brook as Henry Galt
- Alan Roscoe as Al Manning
- Vola Vale as Betty Bond
- Myrtle Vane as Mrs. Martin
- Charlotte Stevens as Irene's Sister

== Preservation ==
With no copies of The Mirage located in any film archives, it is a lost film.
