= New 42 =

Non-profit organization in the US

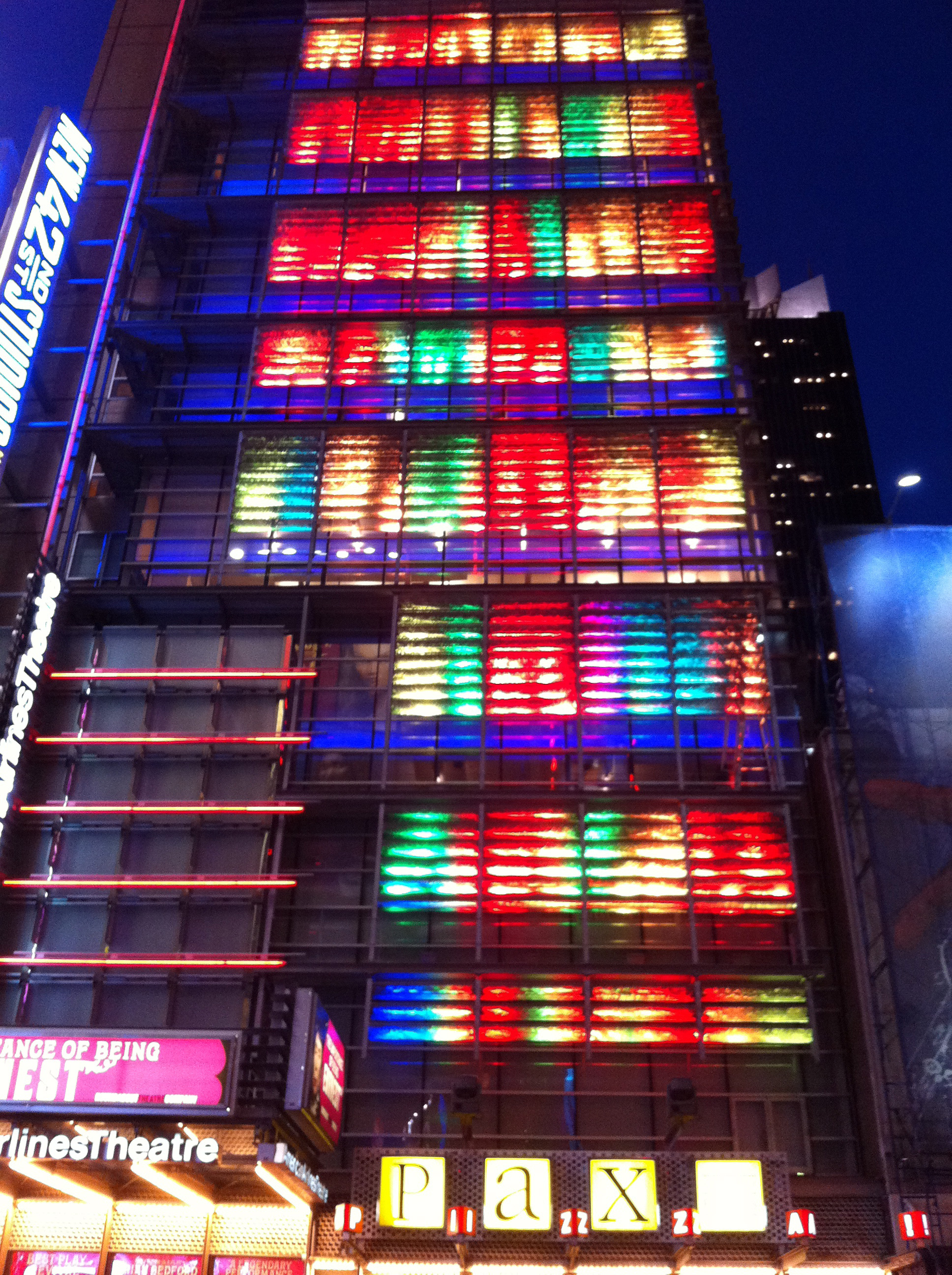
The New 42nd Street's headquarters building at night

The New 42 (formerly the New 42nd Street) is a not-for-profit organization based in Manhattan, New York City. In 1990, the New 42nd Street was formed to oversee the redevelopment of seven neglected and historic theatres on 42nd Street between Seventh and Eighth Avenues, and to restore the block to a desirable tourist destination in Manhattan. New 42, established by New York City and the State of New York as a nonprofit, was granted a 99-year lease on the seven historic theaters for $10 annually. The properties were renovated through partnerships with real estate developers, who were given tax breaks in exchange for renovating the theaters.

The theatres were the Apollo Theatre, the Empire Theatre, the Liberty Theatre, the Lyric Theatre, the Selwyn Theatre, the Times Square Theatre, and the Victory Theater.

- The Victory Theater was the first theater on the block to be restored, and reopened as the off-Broadway New Victory Theater in 1995. The New Victory Theater is programmed by the New 42nd Street with a focus on family entertainment, including international productions of theater, circus, puppetry, opera and dance for kids of all ages. The theater's programming is complemented by an award-winning educational program in New York City schools.
- The Apollo and Lyric theatres were demolished, but sections were preserved for incorporation into a new 1,900-seat Broadway musical venue. On December 26, 1997, it opened as The Ford Center for the Performing Arts with the New York premiere of Ragtime. Subsequently, it was renamed the Hilton Theatre and later the Foxwoods Theatre. Following a takeover by the Ambassador Theatre Group, it has taken the Lyric Theatre name.
- The Empire and Liberty were incorporated into an entertainment complex built by Forest City Ratner which includes the New York branch of Madame Tussauds Wax Museum and formerly included the Ripley's Believe It or Not! Odditorium in the former Liberty Theatre lobby and offices. The shell of the Empire was physically lifted and moved closer to Eighth Avenue, becoming the lobby of an AMC Theatres cinema, which opened in 2000.
- The Selwyn Theatre became the 750-seat American Airlines Theatre, reopening on July 27, 2000, following renovations, and is currently one of Roundabout Theatre Company's Broadway venues. It was renamed the Todd Haimes Theatre after Roundabout's former artistic director following his death in 2023.
- In 2011, Broadway 4D Theaters, LLC leased the Times Square Theatre for a new multimedia Broadway-themed 4-D attraction; however, the project was cancelled. In 2018, developers announced the venue would be converted to retail space that would retain the proscenium, boxes, and many elements from the original structure. The work would take approximately two years at a cost of $100 million. As of 2025, construction is still ongoing.

The New 42nd Street also operates the New 42nd Street Building at 229 West 42nd Street, designed by the firm of Platt Byard Dovell, which opened in 2000 and is home to the New 42nd Street Studios as well as The Duke on 42nd Street – a 199-seat black box theater named for Doris Duke – and three floors of office spaces used by seven non-profit performing arts organizations, including the New 42nd Street.
