= Times Square Theatre =

Former theater in Manhattan, New York

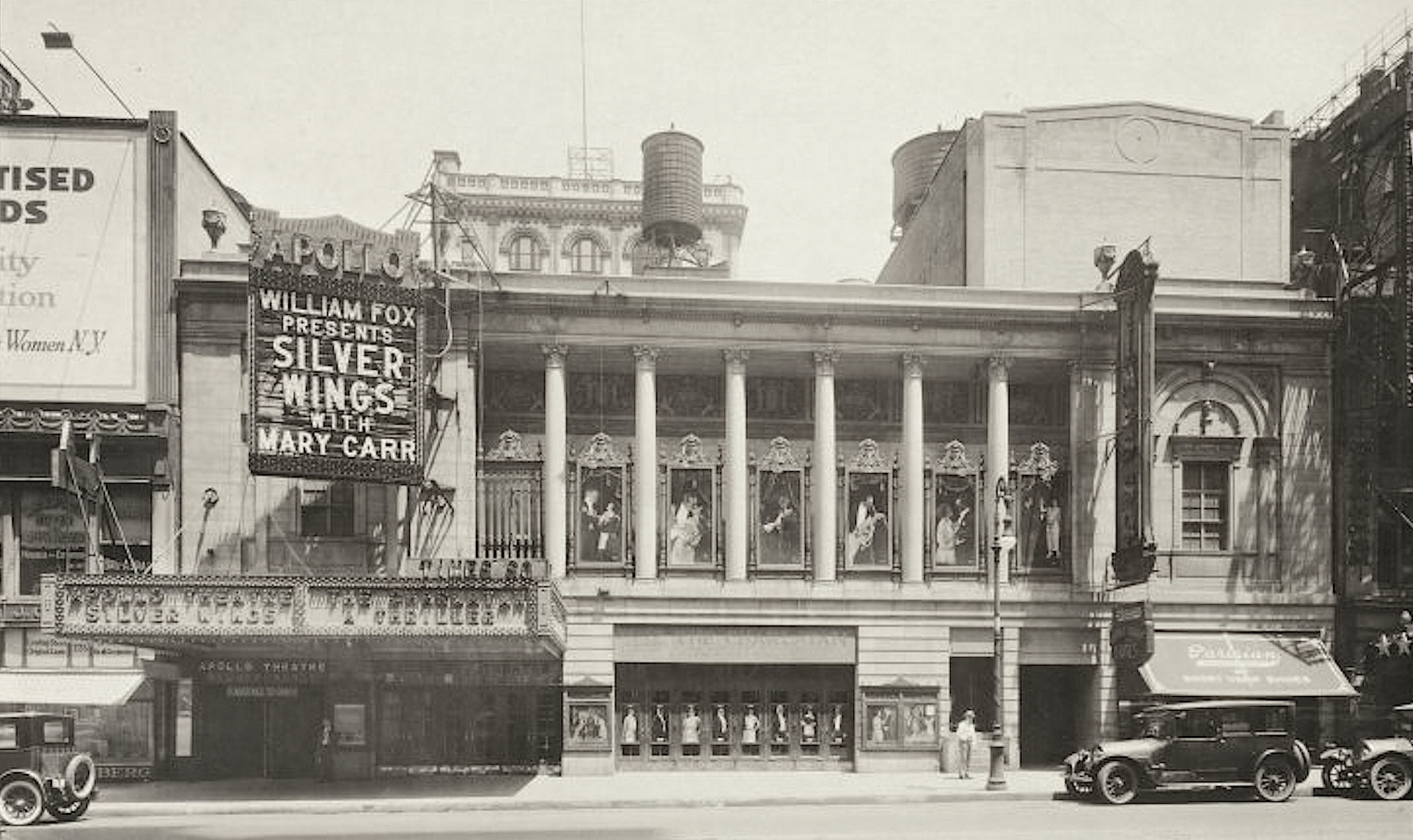
- Times Square Theatre, with entrance to Apollo Theatre (left), 1922
- Interactive map of Times Square Theatre
- Address: 215–217 West 42nd Street; Manhattan, New York; United States
- Coordinates: 40°45′24″N 73°59′16″W
- Owner: City and State of New York
- Capacity: 1,032
- Type: Former Broadway and movie

Construction
- Opened: September 30, 1920
- Closed: 1990
- Years active: 1920–1933 (Broadway); 1934–1990 (films)
- Architect: Eugene De Rosa

Tenant
- New 42nd Street

The Times Square Theatre (Note: Many sources such as The New York Times have editorial policies which prohibit using the spelling theatre even when it is an official proper name. These publications consistently use the spelling theater in all cases across their publications regardless of real world names. For this reason there are consistent spelling errors in many published newspaper references. Academic book sources with detailed written histories on this theater such as Van Hoogstraten's Lost Broadway Theatres (1991, Princeton Architectural Press) and Morrison's Broadway Theatres: History and Architecture use the spelling Times Square Theatre.) is a former Broadway and movie theater at 215–217 West 42nd Street, near Times Square, in the Theater District of Midtown Manhattan in New York City, New York, U.S. Built in 1920, it was designed by Eugene De Rosa and developed by brothers Edgar and Archibald Selwyn. The building, which is no longer an active theater, is owned by the city and state governments of New York and leased to New 42nd Street.

The Times Square Theatre was designed simultaneously with the now-demolished Apollo Theatre immediately to the north and west. The theaters shared a symmetrical facade on 42nd Street, which is made of limestone and contains a central colonnade. The Times Square Theatre took up most of the facade, though the western section was occupied by the Apollo Theatre's entrance. Inside, the Times Square Theatre had a fan-shaped auditorium that could seat 1,155 people. The auditorium was designed in a silver, green, and black color scheme and had a shallow balcony, box seats, and murals. As part of a renovation proposed in 2018, the theater building will be substantially expanded with a glass annex, the original facade will be raised, and some of the interior elements will be preserved.

The Times Square opened on September 30, 1920, with Edgar Selwyn's play The Mirage. The theater mostly hosted legitimate shows in its first decade, but it briefly screened films in 1926 and 1928. Notable shows included The Front Page (1928), Strike Up the Band (1930), and Private Lives (1931). The theater staged its last show in 1933, and the theater became a cinema the next year. The Brandt family operated the Times Square for the next five decades, showing westerns and action films. There were several proposals to redevelop theaters along 42nd Street in the 1980s. New 42nd Street took over the Times Square and several neighboring theaters in 1990, but the theater building was difficult to lease out because of its lack of a rear entrance. Among the unsuccessful bids were those by MTV, Marvel Mania, Livent, Ecko Unltd., and a 4D theater company. Stillman Development International leased the building in 2017 and hired Beyer Blinder Belle to renovate it.

== Site ==
The Times Square Theatre is at 215–217 West 42nd Street, on the northern sidewalk between Eighth Avenue and Seventh Avenue, near the southern end of Times Square in the Midtown Manhattan neighborhood of New York City, New York, U.S. The building occupies a nearly square land lot covering 10,401 ft^{2} (966.3 m^{2}), with a frontage of 105 ft (32 m) on 42nd Street (Note: The building contains both the former entrance to the Apollo Theatre, as well as the Times Square Theatre itself. The Apollo Theater entrance is 11 ft 5 in (3.48 m) wide. The portion of the building housing the former Times Square Theatre is only about 94 feet (29 m) wide.) and a depth of 100.5 ft (30.6 m). The theater is surrounded to the east and north by the Lyric Theatre. It also shares the block with the Hotel Carter building and the Todd Haimes Theatre to the west, as well as the New Victory Theater and 3 Times Square to the east. Other nearby buildings include 255 West 43rd Street, the St. James Theatre, the Hayes Theater to the northwest; 229 West 43rd Street and 1501 Broadway to the north; 5 Times Square and the New Amsterdam Theatre to the southeast; and the Candler Building to the south.

The surrounding area is part of Manhattan's Theater District and contains many Broadway theaters. In the first two decades of the 20th century, eleven venues for legitimate theatre were built within one block of West 42nd Street between Seventh and Eighth Avenues. The New Amsterdam, Harris, Liberty, Eltinge, and Lew Fields theaters occupied the south side of the street. The original Lyric and Apollo theaters (combined into the current Lyric Theatre), as well as the Times Square, Victory, Selwyn (now Todd Haimes), and Victoria theaters, occupied the north side. These venues were mostly converted to movie theaters by the 1930s, and many of them had been relegated to showing pornography by the 1970s.

== Design ==
The Times Square Theatre, along with the Apollo Theatre immediately to the north and west, was developed by brothers Edgar and Archibald Selwyn in 1920. Both theaters were built simultaneously and designed by Eugene De Rosa. Architectural Plastering Co. performed the theater's exterior sgraffito work, while L. S. Fischl's Sons was the interior decorator.

=== Facade ===
The theater's original facade, shared with the former Apollo Theatre, is made of limestone and is symmetrical. The layout is similar to that of the still-extant Music Box Theatre. The westernmost section served as an entrance to the Apollo Theatre, whose auditorium was originally on 43rd Street. There was a marquee overhanging the entrance to the Apollo. Above that was a vertical sign advertising the two theaters. The Apollo's name was placed on the western face of the sign, while the Times Square's name was placed on the eastern face. In addition, there were entrances to the Times Square Theatre to the east, separated by rusticated limestone piers. The two theaters' entrances were otherwise identical in design.

At the second floor is a colonnade of six columns between a pair of outer bays. The New York Times described the columns as being in the Doric order. There were originally seven wrought-iron screens, one between each set of columns. The auditorium facade is slightly recessed behind the colonnade, creating a gallery. The outermost bays in the second floor contained sash window panes, flanked by pilasters that support a round arch. The pilasters in the corners of the arches were carved. A cornice ran above the facade. Unlike the four neighboring theaters, the Times Square Theatre did not have any access from 43rd Street; its auditorium and stage house were both on 42nd Street. The auditorium was positioned parallel to the street, facing eastward.

As of 2018, Beyer Blinder Belle is planning to substantially reconfigure the Times Square Theatre building. The proposed renovation includes increasing the building's height to six stories, with its roof 138 ft (42 m) high. Four stories will be built above the existing building. The existing facade will be raised by 5 ft (1.5 m) to accommodate higher ceilings on the ground floor. The second story will have a glass enclosure in front of the colonnade, allowing passersby to view the former theater's interior. The enclosure, measuring 23 ft (7.0 m) tall, will partially cantilever above the sidewalk on 42nd Street. LED signs are also planned to be installed on the building's exterior. An open-air restaurant will also be placed on the roof.

=== Interior ===
==== Original theater ====
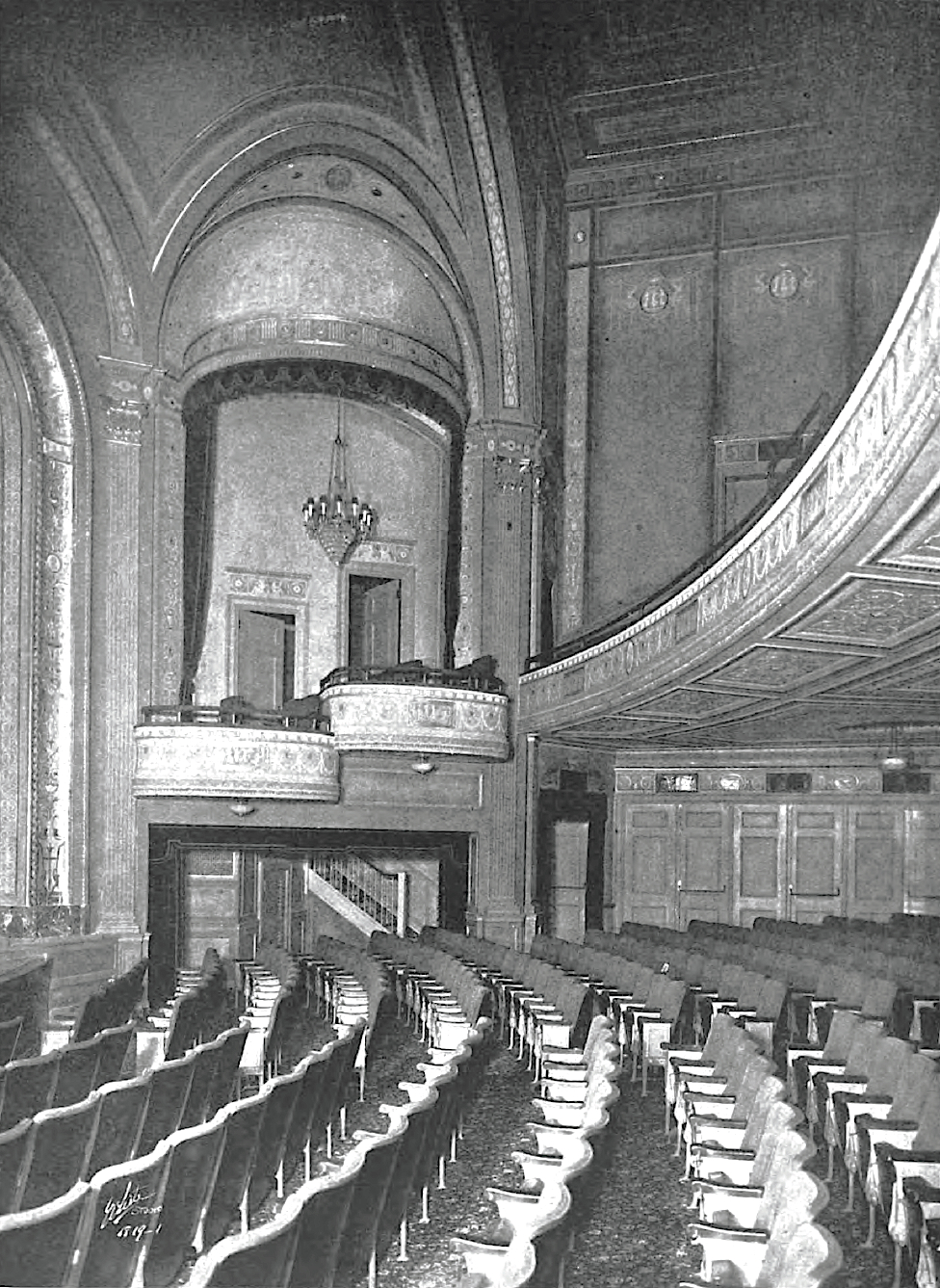
View of interior (1920)

The Times Square Theatre had a fan-shaped layout. A contemporary account said the theater could accommodate 1,127 people; meanwhile, The Broadway League and Playbill both cite a capacity of 1,055, and theater historian Mary C. Henderson gives a figure of 1,035. The interior was originally decorated in the Empire style with some Adam style ornamentation. The original color scheme was silver and green against a black background. In later years, the green decorations faded to gray.

The theater had two levels of seating: a ground-floor orchestra level, as well as a balcony with a slightly higher seating capacity. The first four rows of the orchestra were designed with armchairs instead of typical theater seats. At balcony level was a crossover aisle with several entrances, reducing the distance that patrons had to climb compared to in older theaters. Near the front of the auditorium, on either side of the balcony level, was a wall section with two box seats. Each wall section had black velvet curtains and was topped by a plaster half-dome. The theater contained an "air cushion" facing 42nd Street to the south, which dampened noise from outdoors. On either side of the auditorium were emergency exits leading to passageways; the New-York Tribune said these were capable of emptying the theater "in a matter of seconds". The ceiling had a dome measuring 35 ft (11 m) wide.

A black velvet curtain separated the audience from the stage, which was 40 ft (12 m) wide. A grand staircase connected the orchestra and balcony levels. There was also a women's lounge and smoking room on balcony level, as well as a men's lounge in the basement. The men's lounge was decorated in the Tudor style and contained wooden paneling. To the west of the Times Square's auditorium was the Apollo's entrance, which consisted of a corridor with paneled walls and several types of marble. To the east of the auditorium is the lobby from the original Lyric Theatre. The old Lyric entrance from 42nd Street, with bas-relief sculptures and black-and-white marble decorations, was retained when the current Lyric Theatre was built in 1998.

==== Proposed conversion ====
The building is proposed to be converted into over 52,000 ft^{2} (4,800 m^{2}) of mixed-use space as of 2019. Most of the building, about 34,000 ft^{2} (3,200 m^{2}), is planned to be used as storefronts. The third and fourth stories are both planned to have double-height ceilings, as well as many of the historical features relocated from the auditorium. Both stories are to have outdoor terraces. A spiral staircase would connect the second through fourth floors, and the dome would be reinstalled above the staircase.

== Use as theater ==
=== Development ===
Times Square became the epicenter for large-scale theater productions between 1900 and the Great Depression. Manhattan's theater district had begun to shift from Union Square and Madison Square during the first decade of the 20th century. From 1901 to 1920, forty-three theaters were built around Broadway in Midtown Manhattan. The Selwyn brothers, developed several Broadway theaters on 42nd Street. Before the Times Square Theatre was developed, the brothers operated the Harris and Selwyn (now Todd Haimes) theaters. The Selwyn Theatre had opened on an adjacent site in 1918. Even before that theater was completed, the Selwyn brothers had asked their partner Crosby Gaige to search for sites where they could build additional theaters. The brothers bought two sites just east of the Selwyn Theatre: a 105-foot-wide (32 m) plot on 42nd Street, which contained George Sturges's unprofitable Bryant Theatre, as well as a 100-foot-wide (30 m) plot on 43rd Street, which was vacant.

As construction proceeded on the Selwyn Theatre in September 1917, the Selwyn brothers announced two additional theaters. Originally, the two theaters were to be named after actress Margaret Illington and producer Margaret Mayo. The following February, the Shubert family acquired a partial interest in the three theaters that the Selwyns were constructing. By this time, the planned Illington Theatre was to be known as the Times Square Theatre. The Selwyn brothers leased the eastern site from Sperry and Hutchinson Co. in July 1918, after the plot had already been excavated. In May 1919, the New York City Department of Buildings approved the Selwyn brothers' plans for a 1,100-seat theater on 42nd Street and a 1,200-seat theater on 43rd Street. The O'Day Construction Company was hired to erect both theaters. The Selwyn brothers intended to use the two theaters exclusively for their own productions.

=== Legitimate use ===
==== Selwyn years ====
The Times Square opened on September 30, 1920, with Florence Reed starring in Edgar Selwyn's play The Mirage. The production was a relative hit, lasting for 192 performances through March 1921. During that play's run, G.K. Chesterton spoke on the topic "Shall We Abolish the Inevitable?" at the theater. This was followed by the musical comedy The Right Girl, as well as the short-lived musical revue The Broadway Whirl. The plays The Demi-Virgin, Honors Are Even, and Love Dreams had short runs at the Times Square in late 1921. That November, the Clemence Dane play A Bill of Divorcement moved from George M. Cohan's Theatre to the Times Square; it was one of the first hits that featured actress Katharine Cornell. The theater also hosted recitals by actress Ruth Draper, who continued her performances there for several years. In 1922, the Times Square hosted plays such as The Charlatan, as well as The Exciters with Tallulah Bankhead.

The Fool, by Channing Pollock, opened in October 1922 and ran for over 200 performances through the next year. As an experiment, the Selwyn brothers brought over several visiting companies in mid-1923 to perform The Fool in place of the usual actors. Each company performed for three days before being performing the production at other theaters. The play Helen of Troy, New York, transferred from the Selwyn Theatre in October 1923; this was followed in December by Pelléas and Mélisande with Jane Cowl, which flopped after 13 performances. During early 1924, André Charlot presented his eponymous musical revue, featuring Gertrude Lawrence, Beatrice Lillie, and Jack Buchanan. Charlot's revue transferred to the Selwyn Theatre in April 1924, swapping houses with the musical Battling Buttler. The theater also hosted a dance recital by Albertina Rasch in May 1924, though the Sabbath Committee ruled that the recital could not be staged on Sundays. That September, the theater hosted Jerome Kern and Howard Dietz's musical Dear Sir, featuring Oscar Shaw and Walter Catlett. It was followed in November by Clifford Grey, Clare Kummer, and Sigmund Romberg's musical Annie Dear, which featured Billie Burke.

==== Decline ====
The Selwyn brothers dissolved their firm in 1925. The same year, the theater hosted the play Mismates, the namesake of the film Mismates. The musical Kosher Kitty Kelly also ran for 166 total performances at the Times Square Theatre and Daly's 63rd Street Theatre, in spite of negative critical reception. Pollock's play The Enemy opened in late 1925 and ran for 202 performances. The Times Square Theatre then showed a variety of films in early 1926, including The Volga Boatman and a double feature of Silence and The Prince of Pilsen. The theater's next legitimate show was Love 'Em and Leave 'Em, which relocated from the Apollo in May 1926.

The Anita Loos play Gentlemen Prefer Blondes opened in September 1926 and ran for 199 total performances across two theaters. During the play's run, the theater also hosted a speech by explorer Richard E. Byrd, a documentary presented by aviator Alan Cobham, and a ballet show. After Blondes relocated from the Times Square in March 1927, A. H. Woods planned to move his production of the play Crime into the theater. Instead, the Times Square screened silent films for the 1927–1928 season. The silent film Sunrise opened at the Times Square in September 1927, and the theater screened the film Dawn in May 1928. Although other theaters on 42nd Street were already struggling to book long-running shows by the late 1920s, the Times Square was still able to secure some hits. Jed Harris leased the theater in mid-1928 and presented the original Broadway production of Ben Hecht and Charles MacArthur's comedy The Front Page, which opened in August 1928. The Front Page ran for 276 performances through April 1929.

Several shows had short runs in 1929, including The Middle Watch and Other Men's Wives. The next hit was George and Ira Gershwin's musical Strike Up the Band, which opened at the theater in January 1930 and ran for 191 performances over the next five months. At the onset of the Great Depression, many Broadway theaters were impacted by declining attendance, leading to many flops. The 1930–1931 season alone had six shows, including a revival of The Merchant of Venice. The season ended with Noël Coward's Private Lives, starring Coward and Gertrude Lawrence, which lasted 256 performances. In the 1931–1932 season, four successive plays closed within one month. The 1932–1933 season, with three shows, was the Times Square's final season as a live venue. The season's shows included Clear All Wires!, Foolscap, and Forsaking All Others. The play Angel, with Lenore Ulric, was intended to have opened at the Times Square in June 1933 but never did so.

=== Movies ===
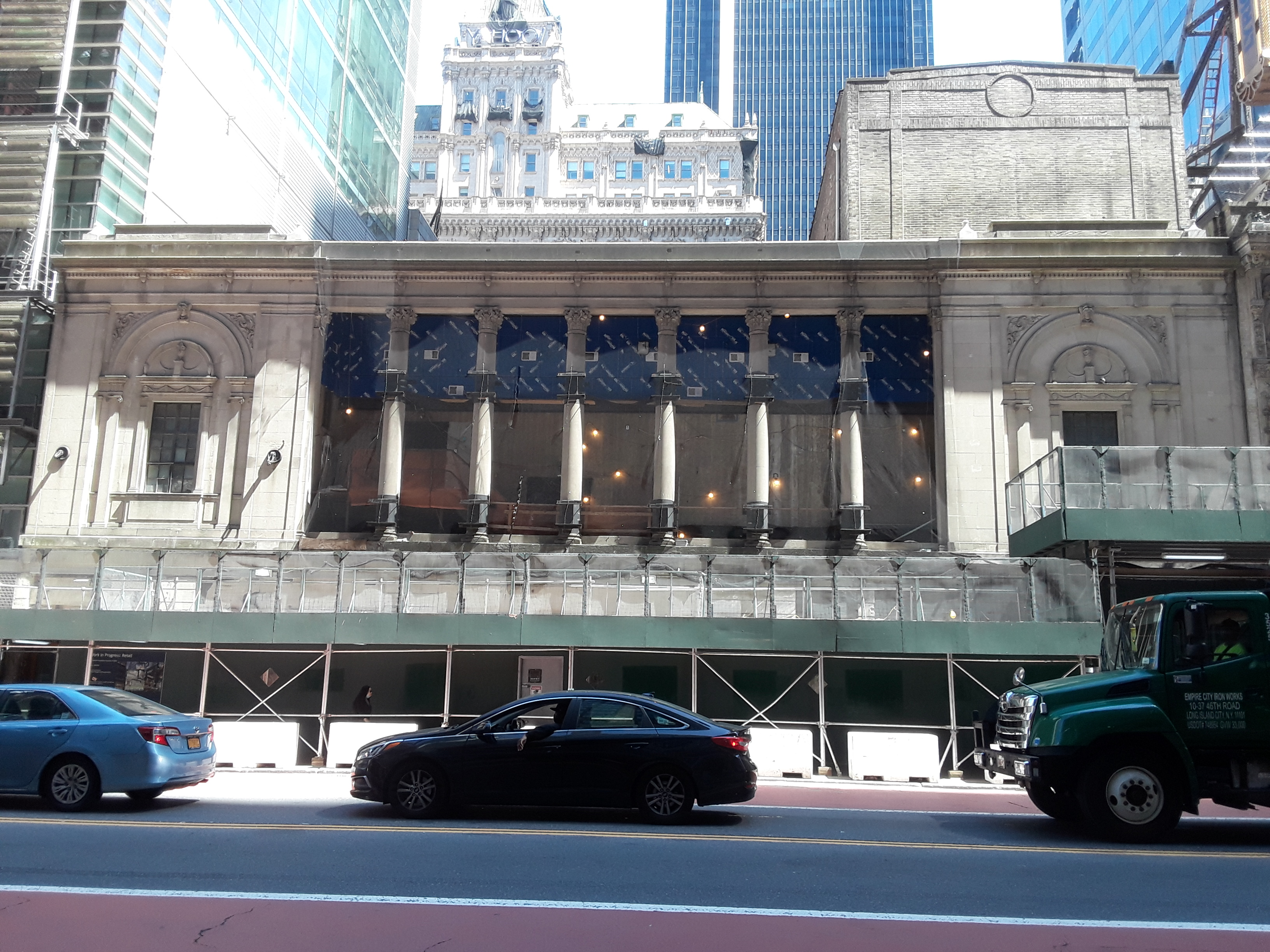
Seen from across 42nd Street (2021)

The theater remained dark for the 1933–1934 season, even though the play Ragged Army had been planned to open there in February 1934. The theater's owner Burgwyn Realty Corp. leased the theater to the Brandt family for use as a cinema in May 1934. The Brandts planned to operate the theater under a grindhouse format, with films running continuously. This was part of a decline in the Broadway theater industry in the mid-20th century; from 1931 to 1950, the number of legitimate theaters decreased from 68 to 30. The lease originally ran for five years. The following year, Burgwyn lost the theater in a foreclosure proceeding. The Times Square and Apollo theaters were auctioned off; Timap Inc. acquired them in June 1935 for $110,000 and assumed responsibility for the existing $800,000 mortgage. The proscenium arch was infilled in 1939 when the former stage house was converted to a haberdashery, since the theater no longer needed these facilities after its conversion into a cinema.

By the mid-1940s, the ten theaters along 42nd Street between Seventh and Eighth Avenues were all showing movies; this led Variety to call the block the "biggest movie center of the world". The Brandts owned seven of these theaters, while the Cinema circuit operated the other three. The Brandt theaters included the Selwyn, Apollo, Times Square, Lyric, and Victory theaters on the north side of 42nd Street, as well as the Eltinge and Liberty theaters on the south side. The Times Square Theatre showed action films and Westerns, and the Brandt changed the bill three times a week. Several producers offered to stage legitimate productions in the Brandt theaters, but none of the offers were successful. William Brandt indicated in 1946 that he might replace the theaters on the north side of 42nd Street with a skyscraper. By then, there was a shortage of new films in the theaters along 42nd Street, which led to decreased attendance.

William Brandt said in 1953 that any of his 42nd Street theaters could be converted to a legitimate house within 24 hours' notice, but producers did not take up his offer. By the late 1950s, the Times Square was classified as a "western and action outlet", displaying films that related to that genre. Tickets cost 25 to 65 cents apiece, the cheapest admission scale for any theater on 42nd Street. The Times Square and the other 42nd Street theaters operated from 8 a.m. to 3 a.m., with three shifts of workers. The ten theaters on the block attracted about five million visitors a year between them.

The 42nd Street Company was established in 1961 to operate the Brandts' seven theaters on 42nd Street. By the early 1960s, the surrounding block had decayed, but many of the old theater buildings from the block's heyday remained, including the Times Square. Martin Levine and Richard Brandt took over the 42nd Street Company in 1972. The Times Square still operated as an action house. The other six theaters showed a variety of genres, though Levine said none of the company's 42nd Street theaters showed hardcore porn. The Brandts' theaters had a combined annual gross of about $2 million and operated nearly the entire day. However, the area was in decline; the Brandts' theaters only had three million visitors by 1977, about half of the number in 1963. The area had also become dangerous and rundown as well. Patrons were fatally shot in separate incidents in 1977 and 1980. The Brandts' movie theaters on 42nd Street continued to operate through the mid-1980s, at which point the Times Square was showing "obscure horror/action triple-bills".

== Redevelopment ==
The 42nd Street Development Corporation had been formed in 1976 to discuss plans for redeveloping Times Square. The same year, the City University of New York's Graduate Center hosted an exhibition with photographs of the Times Square Theatre and other theaters to advocate for the area's restoration. Another plan, in 1978, called for restoring the Selwyn, Apollo, and Harris for opera and dance, rather than for theatrical purposes. Other nearby buildings, including possibly the Times Square Theatre, would have been razed to create a park.

=== Preservation attempts ===
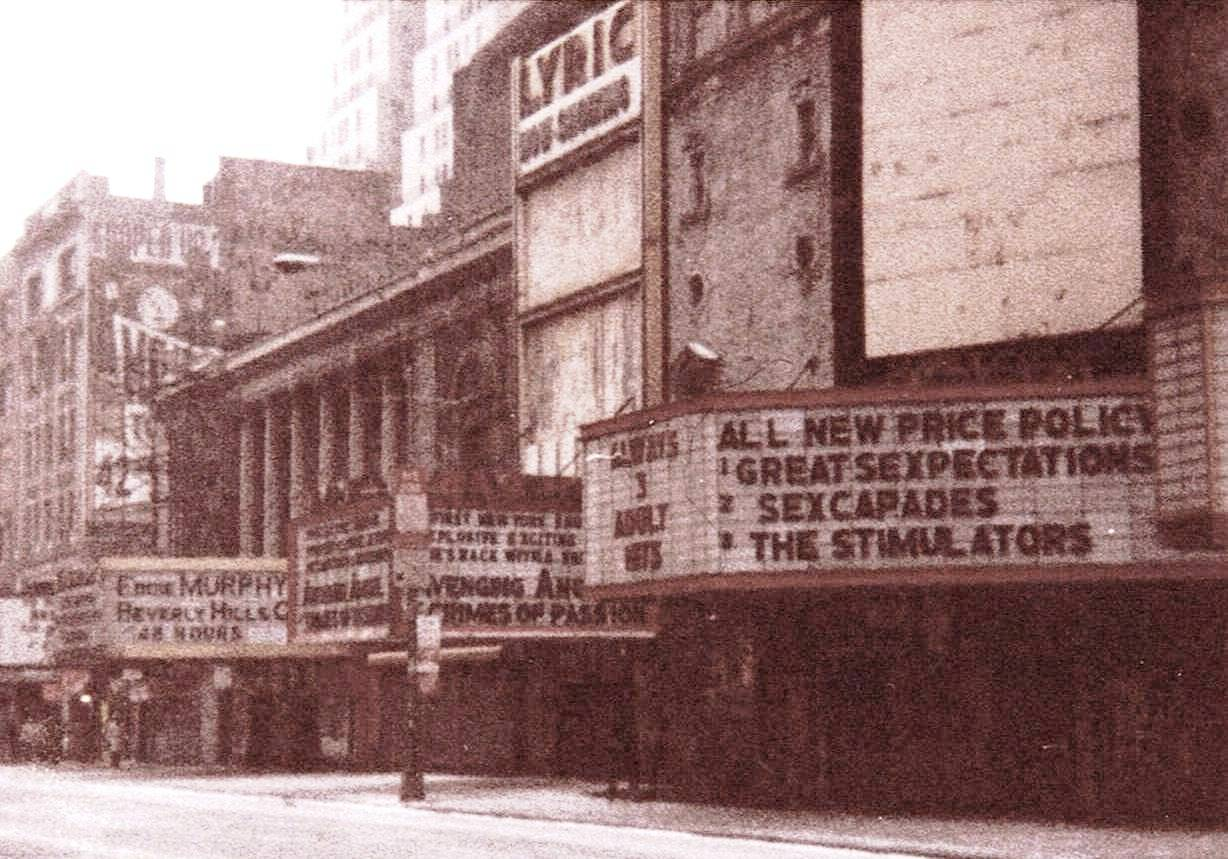
Seen in 1985, beside the old Victory and Lyric theaters at right

Another plan, called the City at 42nd Street, was announced in December 1979 as part of a proposal to restore West 42nd Street around Times Square. Under the plan, the Times Square Theatre would have been preserved, and some of the other theaters would have been modified. Mayor Ed Koch wavered in his support of the plan, criticizing it as a "Disneyland on 42nd Street". Subsequently, Hugh Hardy conducted a report on 42nd Street's theaters in 1980. His report, in conjunction with a movement opposing the demolition of the nearby Helen Hayes and Morosco theaters, motivated the New York City Landmarks Preservation Commission (LPC) to survey fifty of Midtown Manhattan's extant theaters in the early 1980s.

The LPC started to consider protecting theaters, including the Times Square Theatre, as landmarks in 1982, with discussions continuing over the next several years. While the LPC granted landmark status to many Broadway theaters starting in 1987, it deferred decisions on the exterior and interior of the Times Square Theatre. Further discussion of the landmark designations was delayed for several decades. In late 2015, the LPC hosted public hearings on whether to designate the Times Square and six other theaters as landmarks. The LPC rejected the designations in February 2016, as the theaters were already subject to historic-preservation regulations set by the state government.

=== Early redevelopment proposals ===
The Urban Development Corporation (UDC), an agency of the New York state government, then proposed redeveloping the area around a portion of West 42nd Street in 1981. The plan centered around four towers that were to be built at 42nd Street's intersections with Broadway and Seventh Avenue, developed by Park Tower Realty and the Prudential Insurance Company of America. (Note: The sites were: Northwest corner of 42nd Street and Seventh Avenue: now 3 Times Square; Northeast corner of 42nd Street and Broadway: now 4 Times Square; Southwest corner of 42nd Street and Seventh Avenue: now 5 Times Square; South side of 42nd Street between Seventh Avenue and Broadway: now 7 Times Square (Times Square Tower)) The Brandt family planned to submit a bid to redevelop some of the theaters they owned on 42nd Street. In June 1982, the Brandts' five theaters on the north side of 42nd Street, including the Times Square, were added to the redevelopment plan. In August 1984, the UDC granted Jujamcyn Theaters the right to operate the Selwyn, Apollo, and Lyric theaters; as part of the same project, the Times Square Theatre would have become retail space. In response, Brandt and Cine Theater Corp. sued the UDC, claiming that the moves shut out independent theatrical operators. Michael J. Lazar would have renovated the four theaters for Jujamcyn, but the city and state removed him from the project in 1986 following a parking scandal. The Brandts also leased all their movie theaters on 42nd Street, including the Times Square, to the Cine 42nd Street Corporation in 1986.

From 1987 to 1989, Park Tower and Prudential hired Robert A. M. Stern to conduct a study on the Apollo, Lyric, Selwyn, Times Square, and Victory theaters on the north side of 42nd Street. Stern devised three alternatives for the five theaters. City and state officials announced plans for the five theaters, along with the Liberty Theatre on the south side of 42nd Street, in September 1988. Stern presented a model of his plan the next month. The plan called for reducing the size of the Selwyn Theatre to accommodate "intimate drama", as well as replacing the Selwyn Building with a structure containing rehearsal studios. The UDC opened a request for proposals for six of the theaters that October. The Liberty and Victory were to be converted into performing-arts venues for nonprofit organizations, while the Selwyn, Apollo, Lyric, and Times Square were to be converted to commercial use. By the end of the year, the plans were threatened by a lack of money.

In early 1989, several dozen nonprofit theater companies submitted plans to the UDC for the takeover of six theaters. Most of the bids were for the Liberty and Victory, but the Selwyn, Apollo, Lyric, and Times Square theaters received 13 bids between them. That year, the Durst Organization acquired the leases to eight theaters in Times Square, including the Selwyn. It subsequently announced plans to renovate the eight theaters in February 1990. The theaters closed when the New York state government acquired the theater sites that April via eminent domain. The city had planned to buy out the theaters' leases but withdrew after the 42nd Street Company indicated it would lease the theaters to another developer. Although Durst protested the move, a New York Supreme Court judge ruled that the condemnation could occur.

=== New 42nd Street control ===
==== 1990s proposals ====
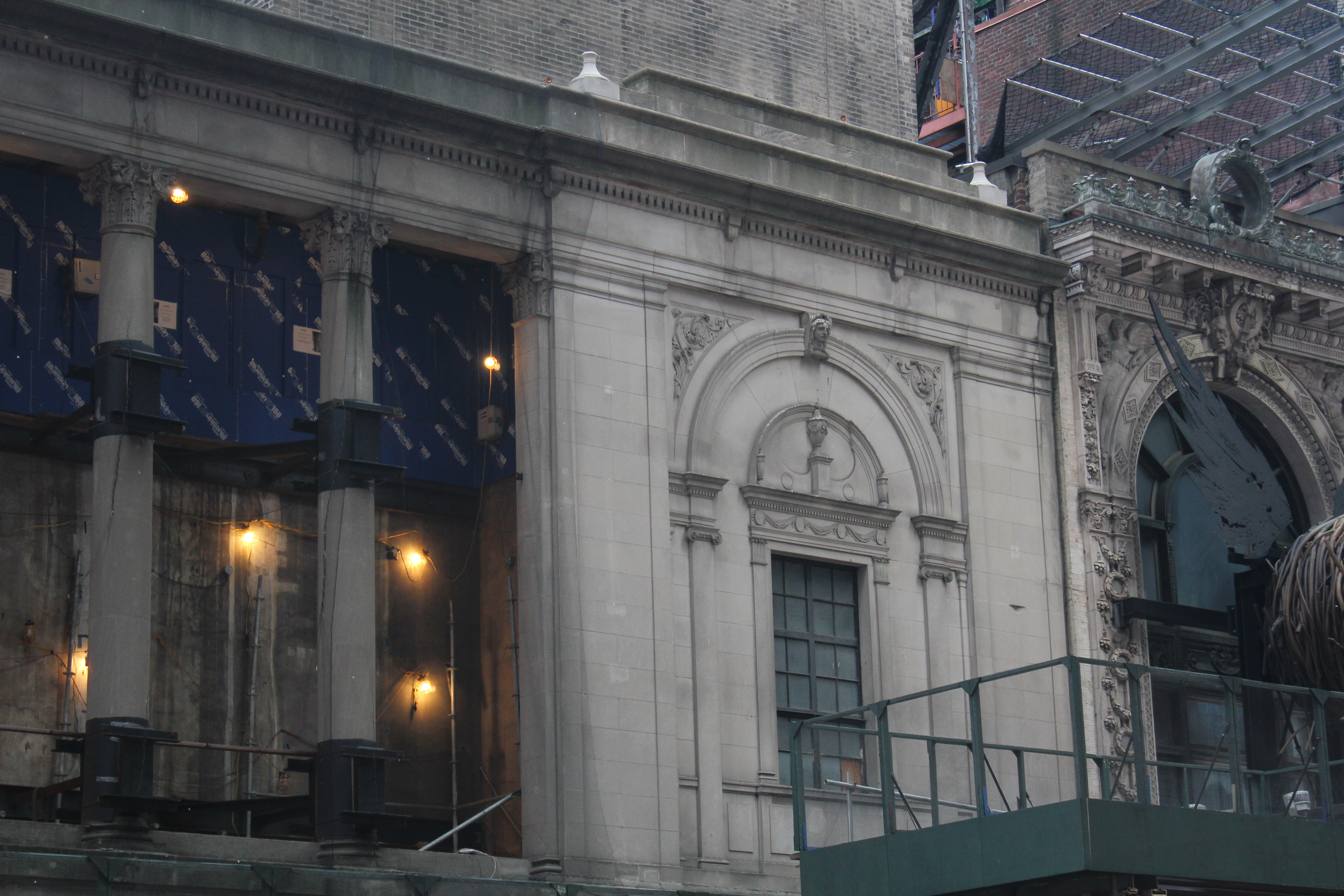
Eastern end of the facade (2021)

A nonprofit organization, New 42nd Street, was formed in September 1990 to restore six of the theaters and find uses for them. Government officials hoped that development of the theaters would finally allow the construction of the four towers around 42nd Street, Broadway, and Seventh Avenue. In 1992, New 42nd Street received a $18.2 million grant for restoring the six theaters as part of an agreement with Prudential and Park Tower. Donna Dennis used the vacant theater's facade in 1993 for an art exhibition that included old playbills. That year, officials proposed opening the New York Information Center, which would occupy the Times Square Theatre and either the Apollo or Lyric theaters. After Disney committed to restoring the New Amsterdam Theatre in 1994, most of the other theaters around 42nd Street were quickly leased. Garth Drabinsky, president of Canadian company Livent, signed a long-term lease for the Apollo and Lyric theaters in July 1995, and the present Lyric Theatre (then known as the Ford Center for the Performing Arts) opened in 1998.

In September 1994, MTV took an option on the Apollo, Lyric, and Times Square theaters, which it planned to convert into a production studio. However, the negotiations with MTV fell through. Marvel Entertainment signed a letter of intent to build a Marvel Mania restaurant inside the Times Square in May 1996. These plans were placed on hold after Marvel Entertainment Group filed for bankruptcy protection at the end of the year. In mid-1997, Billboard Live International was negotiating to renovate the Times Square into a live-concert venue. Had this plan been successful, the theater building would have been expanded to 35,000 ft^{2} (3,300 m^{2}) to accommodate live concerts, and much of the theater's architectural details would have been preserved. After Billboard Live reneged, CBS considered leasing the theater as a broadcast studio by late 1997. Ultimately, CBS never signed a lease. Yet another themed restaurant, operated by the World Wrestling Federation, was proposed for the theater in early 1998, though WWF also did not sign a lease.

New 42nd Street leased the theater in August 1998 to Livent, which proposed an entertainment complex with a 500-seat auditorium and a themed restaurant. Livent encountered major accounting issues within a week of the lease. By November 1998, Livent had filed for Chapter 11 bankruptcy protection, and the company canceled its plans to redevelop the Times Square Theatre. New 42nd Street Inc. president Cora Cahan said she had received several proposals for potential uses of the theater, though most bidders said they did not want to build a performance space there. Producer Stewart F. Lane had proposed converting the theater for live use, but Cahan rejected the plan in January 1999. In the meantime, advertising firm TDI installed seven advertisement panels between the theater's columns. Cahan said that, in three months, the ads could raise $100,000 for New 42nd Street's adjacent rehearsal studios. By then, the popularity of theme restaurants was decreasing, and most sites in the neighborhood had already been redeveloped.

==== 2000s and early 2010s ====
The Times Square Theatre remained empty in 2000, after every other theater on the block had been renovated. Part of the issue was that it was not viable as a theater, as its only entrance was on 42nd Street, making it more difficult to load scenery and props. In addition, the Times Square was old, had a small lobby, and suffered from noise issues. The 42nd Street Development Project had its offices on the former stage until 2004. Construction workers removed seat cushions and dismantled the project's offices before the theater was marketed for commercial use. That year, New 42nd Street agreed to lease the Times Square to Ecko Unltd., which planned to convert it into a hip-hop store. Ecko planned to build a 20,000 ft^{2} (1,900 m^{2}) or 30,000 ft^{2} (2,800 m^{2}) store across four floors. The firm of Janson-Goldstein was hired to renovate the space; at the time, the store would have been completed in 2006. The project stalled after the planning process, even though Ecko had continued to pay rent, and the theater was covered in plywood. In 2009, the company abandoned its lease, and Cahan considered filing a lawsuit against Ecko.

A mural by Sofia Maldonado was placed on the empty theater in 2010. The Observer reported in early 2011 that a 4D theater was being planned for the Times Square. The next year, a group called Broadway 4D Theaters, LLC signed a long-term lease for the theater. The Times Square would have been renovated to accommodate a 4D film presentation dedicated to the history of Broadway, Broadway Sensation, to be produced by lawyer Robert Kory and producer/director Gary Goddard. The attraction was expected to open in early 2015. The Times Square had proven so hard to lease that the Real Estate Board of New York granted an award to the brokers who had arranged the deal. The media reported in 2014 that the project had been canceled due to financial troubles. In August 2015, Elie Samaha and Donald Kushner announced they purchased the assets of Broadway 4D Theaters and would continue the project. Singaporean company Oracle Projects International reportedly leased the theater in March 2016 for use as an event space.

==== Renovation ====
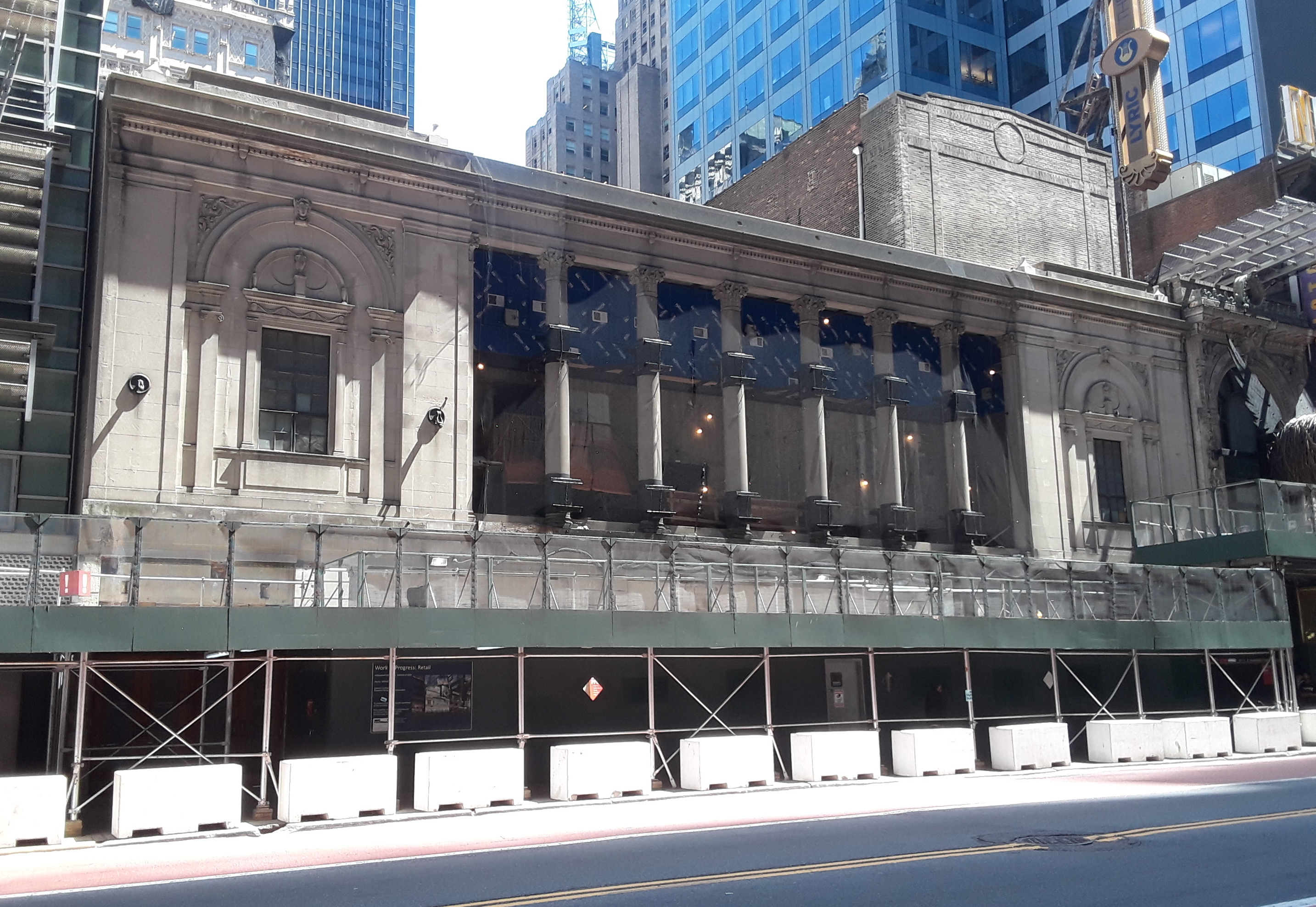
Under renovation in 2021

Stillman Development International LLC signed a 73-year lease for the Times Square Theatre in 2017. The following year, Stillman and its partner Daishin Securities announced a $100 million renovation of the building. Colliers International was also hired to market the building. At the time of the announcement, the project was supposed to take two years. Stillman hired Beyer Blinder Belle to design the renovation, add several stories, and raise the facade by five feet. The facade would be separated from the interior structure and raised using hydraulic jacks. In addition, Stillman would remove the proscenium arch, dome, and boxes for restoration. Even though the LPC had not designated the Times Square Theatre as a landmark, parts of the building were still subject to preservation guidelines. The New York City Economic Development Corporation and the 42nd Street Development Project's Historic Preservation Committee both supported the plans.

In early 2019, Stillman's executive vice president Armen Boyajian expressed hope that the theater's restoration would be completed by early 2021. John Tiedemann had removed an iron gate on the facade for restoration, while contractor Shawmut had removed some of the interior decorative elements. The developers filed partial demolition plans for the Times Square Theatre with the New York City Department of Buildings in July 2019. The developers then submitted construction plans in February 2020. Though the renovation had been slated for completion in 2020, the renovation was still incomplete at the beginning of 2021, and the developers did not give an updated timeline. Progress on the renovation stalled during the COVID-19 pandemic in New York City.

Work on the Times Square had stalled by January 2023 because no tenants had shown interest in occupying the theater. Stillman subsequently contemplated erecting a rental apartment building atop the theater. The New York City government proposed increasing the theater's monthly rent from $50,000 to $160,000 in 2024, citing the fact that no progress had been made on the project. This prompted a lawsuit from Stillman, who wanted to continue paying the old rent rate.

== Notable productions ==
Productions are listed by the year of their first performance. This list only includes Broadway shows; it does not include films screened there.

Notable productions at the theater
Opening year	Name	Refs.
1920	The Mirage	
1921	The Demi-Virgin	
1921	A Bill of Divorcement	
1923	Pelleas and Melisande	
1924	Andre Charlot's Revue of 1924	
1924	Battling Buttler	
1925	Mismates	
1925	Kosher Kitty Kelly	
1926	Gentlemen Prefer Blondes	
1928	The Front Page	
1929	The Middle Watch	
1929	Other Men's Wives	
1930	Strike Up the Band	
1930	The Merchant of Venice	
1931	Private Lives	
1932	Clear All Wires!	
1933	Forsaking All Others	

== See also ==
- List of Broadway theaters
