= Strata Tower =

Strata Tower is a forty-story luxury residential building in Abu Dhabi, designed by New York-based architects Hani Rashid and Lise Anne Couture of Asymptote Architecture, currently being built on Al Raha Beach. Construction has begun and it was scheduled for completion by 2013. It is being developed by Aldar Properties.

== Overview ==
Strata Tower was planned to have a height of 160 meters to dominate the skyline of the Al Dana precinct. Asymptote designed the tower to have a curvilinear exterior, with a cantilevered exoskeleton structure which allows much light into the interior.

== See also ==
- Strata SE1, building of the same name in London
