= Frederick John Kiesler =

Austrian architect and sculptor (1890–1965)

Frederick Jacob Kiesler
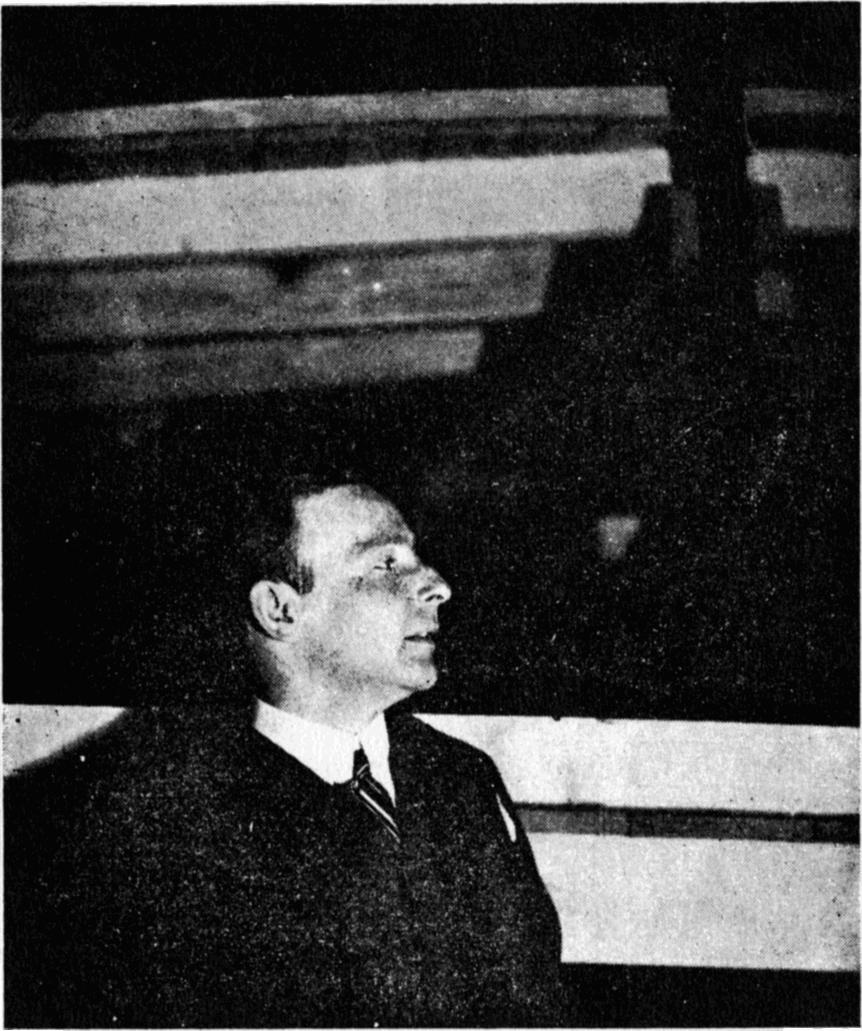
- Kiesler in 1924
- Born: Friedrich Jacob Kiesler; September 22, 1890; Chernivtsi, Austria-Hungary
- Died: December 27, 1965 (aged 75); New York City, US
- Known for: Architect, designer
- Notable work: Shrine of the Book (1957–65)

Frederick Jacob Kiesler (September 22, 1890 – December 27, 1965) was an Austrian-American architect, theoretician, theater designer, artist and sculptor.

== Biography ==
Kiesler was born Friedrich Jacob Kiesler in Czernowitz, Austro-Hungarian Empire (now Chernivtsi, Ukraine).

From 1908 to 1909, Kiesler studied at the Technische Hochschule in Vienna. From 1910–12, he attended painting and printmaking classes at the Akademie der bildenden Künste, both in Vienna. In July 1913, Kiesler quit the academy without having earned a diploma.

He married Stefanie (Stefi) Frischer (1897–1963) in 1920, and they moved to New York City in 1926, where he lived until his death. "In December, Friedrich Kiesler became a naturalized American citizen and changed his name to Frederick John Kiesler." Kiesler collaborated there early on with the Surrealists, and with Marcel Duchamp. His writing was extensive, and his theoretical work embraced two lengthy manifestos, the article "Pseudo-Functionalism in Modern Architecture" (Partisan Review, July 1949) and the book Contemporary Art Applied to the Store and Its Display (New York: Brentano, 1930).

Stefi Kiesler died in September 1963. In 1964, the year before his death, Kiesler married Lillian Olinsey, his longtime secretary and confidante, as Stefi had advised him to do while she was still living. In May 1965, he traveled to Jerusalem for the inauguration of the Shrine of the Book; seven months later he died in New York City.

== Design and architectural career ==
Kiesler was productive as a theater and art-exhibition designer in the 1920s in Vienna and Berlin. In 1920, he started a brief collaboration with architect Adolf Loos and, in 1923, became a member of the De Stijl group in 1923. Kiesler was friendly with many of the major figures of the European avant-garde, which may have influenced his heretical approach to artistic theories and practices.

Already in 1922, Kiesler created a multimedia design for the Berlin production of Karel Čapek's Rossum’s Universal Robots. Kiesler used a kinetic design that included moving side screens and a 2.5 metre iris. Moreover, film sequences were projected onto a waterfall, making it the first production in history that married media projection and flowing water.

Kiesler organised the Internationale Ausstellung neuer Theatertechnik in Vienna in 1924 and on September 24, 1924 arranged the world premiere of the 16-minute film Ballet mécanique, directed by Dudley Murphy and Fernand Léger, with Man Ray. In November 1975, Lillian Kiesler, Frederick's second wife, found Léger's original spliced 35mm, 16-minute version of the film in the closet of their week-end house in the Hamptons on Long Island, near New York City. This version, restored by Anthology Film Archives, has since been included in the documentary film compilation Unseen Cinema: Early American Avant-Garde Film 1893–1941 (released as a seven-disc DVD set by Image Entertainment, October 2005). The music for the film was originally composed by George Antheil, who used it to create a separate concert piece, also named Ballet mécanique, which premiered in Paris in 1926.

His architectural designs include the Film Guild Cinema (1929) in New York City and, with Armand Phillip Bartos, the Shrine of the Book (1965) in Jerusalem, Israel.

From 1937 to 1943, Kiesler was the director of the Laboratory for Design Correlation within the Department of Architecture at Columbia University, where the study program was more pragmatic and commercially oriented than his deep, theoretical concepts and ideas, such as those about "correalism" or "continuity," which concern the relationship among space, people, objects and concepts.

For his object designs, such as the biomorphic furniture in his Abstract Gallery room of Peggy Guggenheim’s The Art of This Century Gallery art salon (1942), for example. For it, he sought to dissolve the visual, real, image, and environment into a free-flowing space. He likewise pursued this approach with his “Endless House,” exhibited in maquette form in 1958–59 at The Museum of Modern Art. The project stemmed from his shop-window displays of the 1920s and his Film Guild Cinema in New York City, mentioned above. Pursuing display and art-gallery work, he was a window designer for Saks Fifth Avenue from 1928 to 1930. Earlier in his career in Europe, Kiesler invented the 1924 L+T (Leger und Trager) radical hanging system for galleries and museums.

His unorthodox architectural drawings and plans that he called "polydimensional" were somewhat akin to Surrealist automatic drawings.

He designed some intriguing furniture, a few pieces of which were featured in the yearbook of the short-lived American Union of Decorative Artists and Craftsmen (AUDAC); he was a founding member of the organization in 1930. Some models of the furniture — none of which was reproduced in numbers as intended — have been posthumously manufactured in limited quantities by various firms in Europe since 1990. The most popular has been the cast-aluminum "Two-Part Nesting Table" (1935).

== Galaxies and installational works ==
During the 1950s, Kiesler created a series of paintings called Galaxies, which translated his vision of space into multi-paneled installations that protruded from the wall. Combining painting, sculpture and drawing, the Galaxies were presented as grouped units. To Kiesler, the space between the different parts was just as important as the paintings themselves, marking a reflection of the “inner necessity” of the work as a whole. He noted that it was the same as what “breathing is to our body reality.” Kiesler wrote further:

Each painting represents a definite unit in itself just as in one family each member is of distinct individuality. Yet, their firm cohesion (into one) is inborn no matter how heterogeneous the character of the members might be. Under these circumstances, it seems natural that each painted unit, particularly when protruding from the wall, and viewed from the side, will also assume the value of a plastic entity, very much in the sense of sculpture, while the aspect of the total galaxy promotes too, the idea of an architectural coordinate without destroying the main character as a painting. Thus the traditional division of the plastic arts, sculpture, and architecture, is transmuted and overcome and their fluid unification is now contained within rather than combined from without.

Frederick Kiesler, Horse Galaxy, 1954

These multi-paneled paintings were also sparked by the artist's response to the political and social upheaval of his time. Conceived only a few years after the atomic bombings of Hiroshima and Nagasaki, Kiesler described his inspiration for the Galaxies as follows:

If the reassessment of values in these tense times is of necessity for each and all of us, one is convinced that the artist’s work too can no longer be placed in isolation: that art must strive again to become part of daily experience. It seems, therefore, that painters, sculptors, and architects must conceive their work – as part of the world.

Installation view of Frederick Kiesler's Us, You, Me at the Parrish Art Museum in 2003.

Kiesler’s body of sculptural works also incorporate similar philosophies, uniting individual pieces with specific placements, further illustrating his theories of human-design relationships. His installation of Us, You, Me (completed 1963–65), included pieces in bronze, aluminum, wood, granite, and concrete in various sizes, and was shown at Hunter College/Times Square Gallery (2004), The Parrish Art Museum (2003), and the University of Iowa Museum of Art (1995). The idea of sculpture as a landscape in Us, You, Me reflects upon Kiesler’s history with stage design, and the subject matters marking underlying anxieties of modern life. Kiesler’s final sculpture Bucephalus, inspired by Alexander the Great’s battle horse, was to be entered by the viewer and used as a grotto for meditation. The sculpture was conceived in concrete and mesh by Kiesler and his assistant, Len Pitkowsky, between 1962–1965 and was posthumously cast in aluminum at the Polich Tallix Foundry, Rock Tavern, New York between 2006–2008.

== Legacy ==
Kiesler was often shunned by his peers, although he was chosen in 1952 as one of "the 15 leading artists at mid-century" by The Museum of Modern Art and in 1957 became a fellow of the Graham Foundation in Chicago. Israeli architects disapproved of his and Bartos's serving as the architects for the Shrine of the Book (1957–65) because they were not Israelis, even though they were Jews. Further objections to Kiesler were that he had not completed his architecture studies and had built no structures, despite having been a licensed architect in New York State since 1930. One of his colleagues at Columbia University joked: "If Kiesler wants to hold two pieces of wood together, he pretends he's never heard of nails or screws. He tests the tensile strengths of various metal alloys, experiments with different methods and shapes, and after six months comes up with a very expensive device that holds two pieces of wood together almost as well as a screw".

The Austrian Frederick and Lillian Kiesler Private Foundation was established in 1997 in Vienna with the acquisition of Frederick Kiesler's estate by the Republic of Austria, the City of Vienna and several private benefactors. Its task is to research Kiesler's legacy and to inscribe it into current architectural and artistic production.

At the express wish of Frederick Kiesler’s widow Lillian, the Austrian Frederick Kiesler Prize for Architecture and the Arts was endowed in 1997. The prize is endowed with 55,000 euros and is presented biennially alternately by the Republic of Austria and the City of Vienna. An international jury of experts, comprising theorists, artists and architects, bestows the prize for “extraordinary achievements in architecture and the arts that relate to Frederick Kiesler’s experimental and innovative attitudes and his theory of ‘correlated arts’ by transcending the boundaries between the traditional disciplines.” Recipients are:

- Frank O. Gehry (1998)
- Judith Barry (2000)
- Cedric Price (2002)
- Asypmptote / Hani Rashid + Lise Anne Couture (2004)
- Olafur Eliasson (2006)
- Toyo Ito (2008)
- Heimo Zobernig (2010)
- Andrea Zittel (2012)
- Bruce Nauman (2014)
- Andrés Jaque (2016)
- Yona Friedman (2018)
- Theaster Gates (2021)
- Junya Ishigami (2024)

== Exhibitions ==
- "Galaxies by Kiesler", Sidney Janis Gallery, New York City, September 27 – October 19, 1954
- "Frederick Kiesler", Hochschule für angewandte Kunst, Vienna, 1975
- "Friedrich [sic] Kiesler—Visionär, 1890–1965", Museum moderner Kunst, Vienna, and touring, from 1988
- "Friedrick [sic] Kiesler", Whitney Museum of American Art, New York City, 1989
- "Frederick Kiesler: arte, architettura, ambiente", Milan, Italy, 1995
- "Friederick [sic] Kiesler: artiste-architecte", Centre Georges Pompidou, Paris, July 3 – October 21, 1996
- "Frederick J. Kiesler: Endless Space", MAK Center for Art and Architecture at the Schindler House, Los Angeles, December 6, 2000 – February 25, 2001
- "Frederick Kiesler: Co-Realities", Drawing Center, New York City, 2008
- "Die Kulisse explodiert. Friedrich Kiesler und das Theater", Österreichisches Theatermuseum, Vienna, October 25, 2012 – February 25, 2013; traveled to Museum Villa Stuck, Munich, March 20 – June 23, 2013
- "Frederick Kiesler: Life Visions", Museum of Applied Arts, Vienna, 2016
- "Inside the Endless House. Re-Reading Friedrich/Frederick Kiesler", MAK – Österreichisches Museum für angewandte Kunst / Gegenwartskunst, Vienna, June 15 – September 25, 2016
- "Friedrich Kiesler: Architect, Artist, Visionary", Martin-Gropius-Bau, Berlin, March 11 – June 11, 2017
- "Frederick Kiesler: Us, You, Me", Kunsthaus Zug, Zug, February 25 – May 26, 2024
- "Frederick Kiesler: Vision Machines", Jewish Museum, New York, April 25 – July 28, 2024

== Sources ==
The Austrian Frederick and Lillian Kiesler Private Foundation
