= W Abu Dhabi – Yas Island =

Hotel in Abu Dhabi, United Arab Emirates

Coordinates: 24.467402°N 54.606059°E

- The hotel in 2013
- Interactive map of the W Abu Dhabi – Yas Island area

General information
- Location: Yas Island, Abu Dhabi, United Arab Emirates
- Groundbreaking: 2007
- Completed: 2009
- Opening: 1 November 2009

Technical details
- Floor area: 85,000-square-meter

Design and construction
- Architect: Asymptote Architecture
- Developer: Aldar Properties

Other information
- Number of rooms: 499
- Number of suites: 75
- Number of restaurants: 6

The W Abu Dhabi – Yas Island, formerly the Yas Hotel Abu Dhabi and Yas Viceroy Hotel Abu Dhabi, is a hotel built above the Yas Marina Circuit in Abu Dhabi, United Arab Emirates. It has been managed by W Hotels since 2019.

== Design ==
Close-up view of hotel in 2011

The hotel is located within the Yas Marina Circuit, Abu Dhabi. The building, designed by Hani Rashid and Lise Anne Couture, principals of New York based Asymptote Architecture, consists of two 12 storey hotel towers, one set within the race circuit and another placed in the Marina itself, linked together by a monocoque steel and glass bridge and Grid Shell structure that both cross the Yas Marina Circuit F1 race track.

The hotel's design includes a 217-meter curvilinear glass and steel facade known as the Grid Shell: it features an LED lighting system with 5,389 glass elements. For this, the architects collaborated with Rogier van der Heide and his team at Arup Lighting. The lighting design received an AL Lighting Design Award for Outstanding Achievement and a "Highly Commended" Middle East Lighting Design Award, as well as a special "Citation for Achievement in Technical Artistry at the 2010 IES Lumen Awards Ceremony in New York City.

== Construction ==
The 499-room, 85,000-square-meter structure was built by Al Futtaim Carillion for Aldar Properties with construction starting in 2007. The feature façade, formed of a steel and glass gridshell, was designed by Asymptote Architecture New York and built by Waagner-Biro.

It opened on 1 November 2009 to coincide with the Formula 1 Etihad Airways Abu Dhabi Grand Prix.

== See also ==
- Ferrari World
- Al Reem Island
- Saadiyat Island
