= Arthur Drexler =

American museum curator

Arthur Justin Drexler (13 March 1925 – 16 January 1987) was an American museum curator and director of the Department of Architecture and Design at the Museum of Modern Art (MoMA) for 35 years.

== Life ==
Drexler was born in Brooklyn and attended the High School of Music and Art, and The Cooper Union studying architecture and served with the U.S. Army Corps of Engineers during the Second World War. After the war Drexler worked with the office of industrial designer George Nelson and was Architecture Editor of Interiors magazine. Drexler joined the Museum of Modern Art in New York in 1951 as Curator of Architecture and Design and was promoted to director of the department in 1956 succeeding Philip Johnson. Drexler has lectured at New York University, Yale University, Harvard University, Pratt Institute, the Massachusetts Institute of Technology, and other universities and institutions.

Drexler had the longest curatorship in the Museum of Modern Art history. Over thirty-five years Drexler conceived, organised and oversaw trailblazing exhibitions that not only mirrored but also foresaw major stylistic design developments in industrial design, architecture and landscaping. During Drexler's curatorship, MoMA played a central role in examining the work and reinforcing the reputations of twentieth-century architects, among them Frank Lloyd Wright, Le Corbusier, Richard Neutra, Marcel Breuer, and Ludwig Mies van der Rohe. Drexler explored unexpected subjects: from the design of automobiles (he was the first to include automobiles in art museums) to a reconstruction of a Japanese house and garden. Drexler's pioneering shows promoted new ideas about architecture and design as modern arts and left an indelible mark on the course of midcentury modernism.

He designed the Philip Johnson Gallery at MoMA.

Drexler retired from the MoMA post due to poor health in 1986 and died in January 1987.

In 1977, Drexler received the American Institute of Architects Medal for "vast contributions in documenting the art of architecture."

== Exhibitions ==
Drexler curated and organized many exhibitions at the MoMA some of those were:

- Eight Automobiles (1951)
- Ten Automobiles (1953)
- Japanese House in the Garden (1954 and 1955),
- 20th Century Design from the Museum Collection (1958–59),
- Visionary Architecture (1960)
- The Drawings of Frank Lloyd Wright (1962)
- Le Corbusier: Building in Europe and India (1963)
- Twentieth Century Engineering (1964)
- The Architecture of Louis I. Kahn (1966)
- The New City: Architecture and Urban Renewal (1967)
- The Architecture of the Ecole des Beaux Arts (1975)
- Le Corbusier: Architecture Drawings (1978)
- Transformations in Modern Architecture (1979)
- Buildings for Best Products (1979)
- The Architecture of Richard Neutra: From International Style to California (1982)
- Mies Van Der Rohe Centennial Exhibition (1986)

== Books ==
Drexler was the author of many books on the twentieth-century architecture and design:

- Built in U.S.A: Postwar Architecture (with Henry-Russell Hitchcock, 1952)
- The Architecture of Japan (1955) ISBN 9780714620428
- Introduction to 20th Century Design (with Greta Daniel, 1959)
- Mies van der Rohe (1960)
- The Drawings of Frank Lloyd Wright (1962)
- The Architecture of the Ecole des Beaux-Arts (1977) ISBN 9780262040532
- Transformations in Modern Architecture (1979) ISBN 9780870706080
- The Mies van der Rohe Archive of The Museum of Modern Art (1986)

== See also ==
- Endless House
- The New York Five
