= Film Guild Cinema =

Former movie theater in Greenwich Village, New York City

- Interactive map of Film Guild Cinema
- Former names: 8th Street Playhouse
- Location: 52 W. 8th Street, Greenwich Village, New York City
- Coordinates: 40.73325°N 73.99885°W
- Type: Movie theater

Construction
- Built: 1929
- Opened: 1929
- Closed: 1991
- Architect: Frederick Kiesler (with earlier designs by Eugene De Rosa)

The Film Guild Cinema was a movie house located at 52 W. 8th Street in Greenwich Village, New York City. Built in 1929 and designed by notable architectural theoretician and De Stijl member Frederick Kiesler (with earlier designs by Eugene De Rosa), it was renamed the 8th Street Playhouse in 1930. The theater operated until 1991 and became known for its midnight movies, particularly The Rocky Horror Picture Show.

== History ==
Kiesler designed the cinema as what he called "The first 100% cinema." The theater opened in 1929 with its first stage performance being Life & Love-Ballet of Hands and its first film screening The Frog Princess.

By the end of World War II, the original exterior designed by Kiesler had been stripped away. In 1946, the theater was photographed by Ruth Bernhard.

The theater eventually became known for its quirky film festivals and nightly midnight movies, most famously The Rocky Horror Picture Show with the world-famous 8th Street Playhouse Floorshow. During the 1980s, Adam Savage worked as a projectionist at the cinema.

After owner Steve Hirsch died in 1986, the theater was taken over by BS Moss, then United Artists, and finally by City Cinemas. The theater closed in 1991.

== Later use ==
Following its closure, the building housed the New York location of the Philadelphia TLA Video chain, a video rental store specializing in non-mainstream film, until 2004. The building currently houses the offices of urgent care physicians associated with Mount Sinai Hospital.
