= St. George Theatre =

Theater in Staten Island, New York

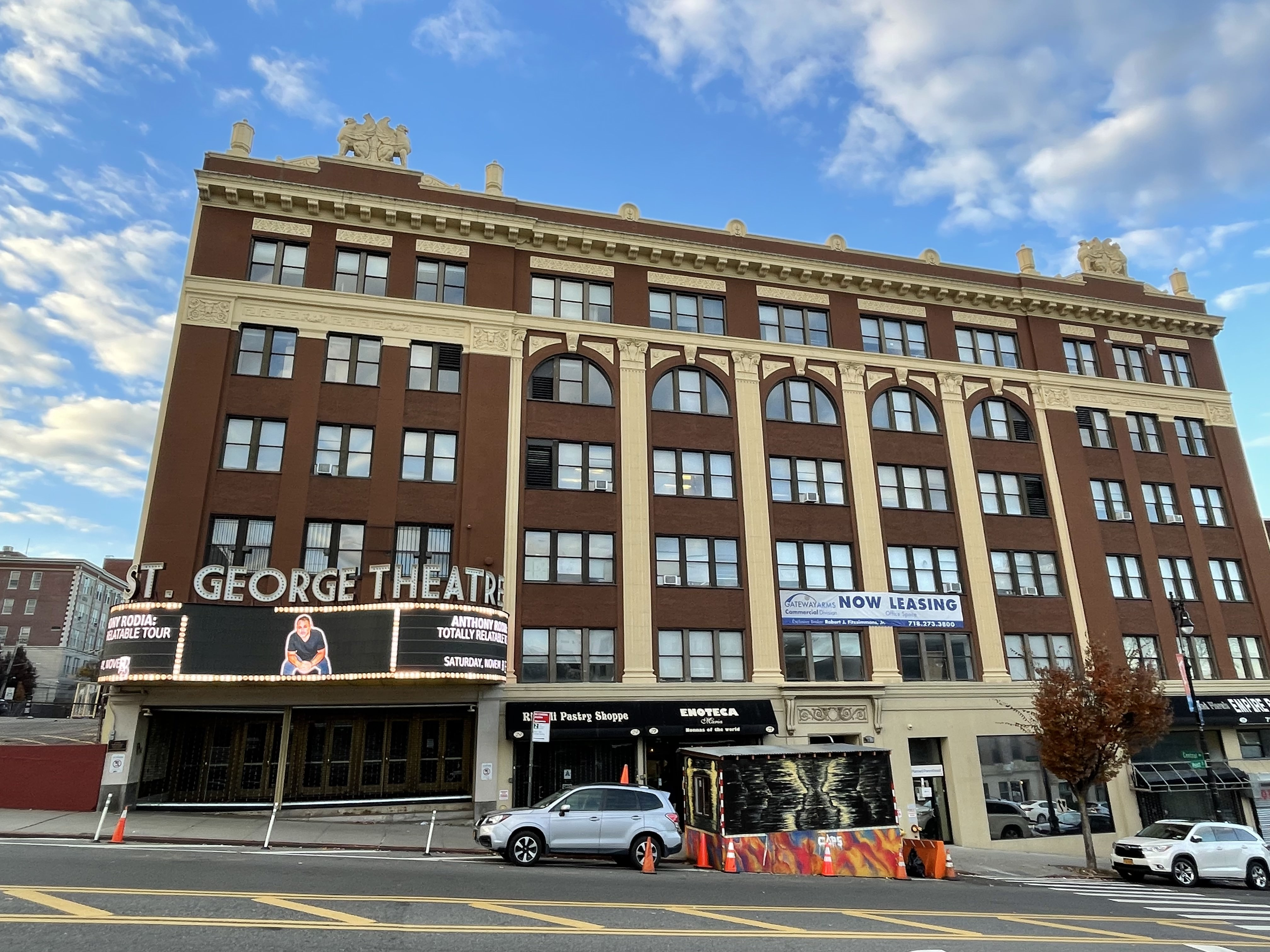
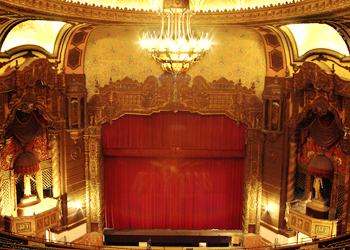
- Exterior Interior
- Interactive map of St. George Theatre
- Full name: St. George Theatre Restoration Inc.
- Address: 35 Hyatt Street; Staten Island, New York; United States
- Location: Staten Island, New York
- Coordinates: 40°38′31.23″N 74°4′39.08″W
- Owner: St. George Theatre Restoration Inc.
- Operator: St. George Theatre Restoration Inc.
- Seating type: Fixed seating
- Capacity: 1,903
- Event: All Genres
- Public transit: St. George Terminal

Construction
- Groundbreaking: August 1928
- Opened: December 4, 1929
- Renovated: 2004
- Architects: Eugene DeRosa (Architect) and Nestor Castro (Interior Designer)

Website
- stgeorgetheatre.com

The St. George Theatre is a performing arts venue, picture palace, and office complex at 35 Hyatt Street in St. George, on the North Shore of Staten Island, New York City. The 2,800-seat St. George Theatre was built for Staten Island theater operator Solomon Brill and opened on December 4, 1929. Today, the theatre has 1,903 seats.

Eugene De Rosa was the St. George Theatre's main architect, and was assisted by Staten Island resident James Whitford, the "dean of Staten Island architects". The ornate interior of the St. George Theatre was designed by Nestor Castro. The interior is a variety of Spanish and Italian Baroque styles. The movie and vaudeville house outshone most of its competitors, including Manhattan's Capitol Theater on Broadway.

The theatre was renovated in 2004. A variety of activities, including educational programs, architectural tours, television and film shoots, concerts, comedy, Broadway touring companies, and children's shows take place there.

== History ==
Construction started in 1928. The theater was built for Solomon Brill, who owned several other theaters on the Island and 15 in the greater New York area. He envisioned the St. George as a show house to rival Manhattan's cinema palaces, and promised to bring top-of-the-line vaudeville to the borough for 75 cents a ticket. The theater opened on December 4, 1929, at a cost of $2 million, $500,000 of which was for the theater. Brill sold the theater within three years to William Fox, namesake of Fox Television Stations and 21st Century Fox.

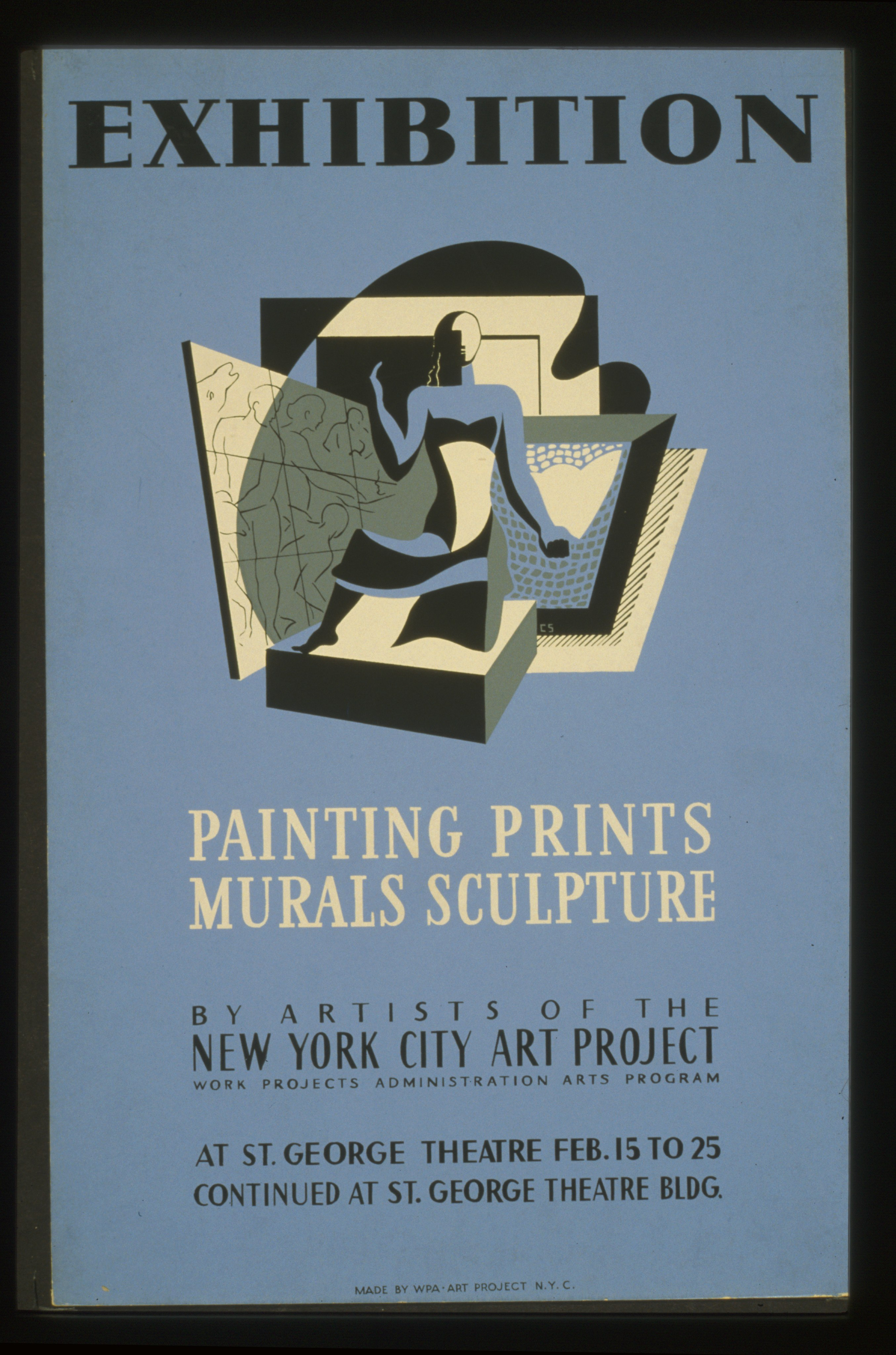
Poster for a Federal Art Project exhibition at the St. George Theatre (1941)

Fabian Theatres, a movie theatre chain, owned and operated the St. George Theatre as its flagship on Staten Island in the 1940s, 1950s and 1960s. Visitors to the St. George Theatre today who utilize the men's room on the main level are actually in what was once the district office for Fabian Theatres in 1965. In the late 1960s, the Fabian chain was broken up; the theatre was operated by Fabian's former general manager until 1975.

When that organization departed, the theatre was leased to a Staten Island concern, Victoria Theatres. It was the plan of these young entrepreneurs to return the theatre to its roots: live stage shows and concerts integrated with film. For the first time since the 1950s, the St. George stage was used as a presentation stage, and not simply as a base for its massive movie screen. Although Victoria Theatres only operated the St. George for approximately a year—from April 1976 to February 1977, Sly Stone, Chaka Khan, and Lester Flatt represented the broad diversity of music acts who graced the St. George's stage during that period.

In 1978, the St. George Theatre ended its life as a movie house. Several entrepreneurs tried to revive it as a dinner theater, a nightclub and an antiques showroom but none were successful. In the mid 90s - early 00s, it was rented by local dance studios for their yearly recitals, including "Mrs. Rosemary's Dance Studio". Others tried their hands at revival and renovation, but it was finally Rosemary Cappozalo, lovingly known as "Mrs. Rosemary", along with her daughters Luanne Sorrentino and Doreen Cugno, began a not-for-profit organization in 2004 to save the historic theatre. Since the theatre reopened in June 2004, over 1000 events have taken place there. In mid-2017, the theater closed for a $5.2 million, several-month-long renovation to renovate the mezzanine seating and add a LED marquee.

== Design ==
The main architect for the theatre was Eugene De Rosa. He was assisted by Staten Island resident James Whitford, who was known as the "dean of Staten Island architects." Whitford also designed the Ritz, Liberty and Victory theaters, none of which exist today. The ornate interior of the St. George Theatre was designed by Nestor Castro, the art director for the Libman-Spanjer Corporation, which designed the interiors of many theaters in the Times Square area.

The theatre's Spanish and Italian Baroque revival style interior was designed by Nestor Castro. The theatre has unobstructed seating, a $25,000 Wurlitzer organ, an advanced cooling and heating system, one of the largest cantilevered balconies ever built, velvet seats, gilded balconies, and grand staircases. Either because or in spite of the theatre's ornate interior—decorative gold plasterwork, stained glass and ironwork—the St. George is noted for near-perfect acoustics. It is not uncommon, to this day, for a performer to stand beneath its six-story proscenium and remark on how beautiful the theatre looks and sounds. It is possible to stand center stage and hold a room-level conversation with someone in the upper balcony, six stories away without raising one's voice.

Even though generations of Staten Islanders refer to or remember the St. George as a movie palace, the original 2,876 seat structure was planned as part of the Radio-Keith-Orpheum (RKO) vaudeville circuit. Only when the theatre was nearly complete in 1929 was a projection booth and spotlight stand contrived by the architects and added to the theatre's interior.

== Use ==
The first movie to be shown at the St. George Theatre was So This Is College which was a 1929 M-G-M production that starred Eddie Nugent, Robert Montgomery and Cliff Edwards. Famous performers such as Al Jolson, Kate Smith and Guy Lombardo performed on the theatre's stage.

Ringo Starr, Tony Bennett, Judy Collins, k.d. lang, Chris Daughtry, Garrison Keillor, David Cassidy, Davy Jones, Adam Lambert, Carl Palmer, Cyndi Lauper, Air Supply, The B-52's, Don McLean, Art Garfunkel, Wayne Newton, Tony Orlando, Liza Minnelli, Yes, Kansas, Steve Hackett, Dennis DeYoung, Neil Sedaka, Taylor Hicks, Melissa Etheridge, Bret Michaels, Donny Osmond, Diana Ross, REO Speedwagon, Plain White T's, and the Jonas Brothers have all performed there. Top comics who have appeared include Jerry Seinfeld, Kevin James, Rosie O'Donnell, Colin Jost, Michael Che, Colin Quinn, Lily Tomlin, Louis C.K., Jerry Lewis, John Mulaney, Joan Rivers, Chris Rock, John Pinette, Pete Davidson, Jim Belushi, Steve Martin, Bill Cosby, Eric D'Alessandro.

The finale of the 2003 film School of Rock was filmed at the St. George Theatre. In December 2008, the television show Gossip Girl filmed scenes at the theater for the 2009 episode "You've Got Yale!" in which the theater was used for scenes at an opera. Steven Spielberg's NBC television show Smash used the theatre for filming in the 2012 season. In January 2014, the St. George Theatre was part of VH1's concert series "Super Bowl Blitz: Six Nights + Six Concerts". In 2015, the Harbor Lights Theater Company of Staten Island presented Gypsy with Sally Mayes. In September 2016, Sophia Loren's tour "An Evening With Sophia Loren" included the St. George Theatre.
