= Endless House =

Work of conceptual architecture by Frederick Kiesler

Endless House is a conceptual work of architecture by Frederick Kiesler. Kiesler used the project to express an elaborate, personal metaphysics based on the concepts of 'connectivity', 'correality' and 'biotechnique'. The project was an attempt to merge the spiritual and practical into a new housing typology.

Although the structure was never built to scale, a miniaturized version was constructed for the "Visionary Architects" exhibit at the Museum of Modern Art, which included Louis Kahn, Frank Lloyd Wright, Buckminster Fuller, and Le Corbusier. Kiesler departed in many ways from the modernist ideals of his contemporaries, objecting to pre-fabrication, rationalism, and orthogonal designs in favor of a curvilinear structure. Reception of the "Endless House" was mixed, garnering the praise of such contemporaries as Robert Rauschenberg and Jasper Johns, while receiving criticism for ideas that were considered to be impractical and outlandish. The "Endless House" concept also appeared in the Japanese publication Bokubi in 1963, and Kiesler's posthumously published artistic journals, titled "Inside the Endless House."

The Endless House model is in the collection of the Whitney Museum of American Art.

== Design ==
The Endless House consists of reinforced concrete over a wire, mesh frame. Its shape is roughly that of a flattened sphere. The structure was elevated on 4 broad pilotis, with two staircases leading to the ground. The layout includes a kitchen/dining room, a living room, a parent's bedroom, a children's bedroom, and a space for seclusion. Windows punctuate the design, and are made of semi-transparent plastic. Different types of flooring throughout the house include sand, grass, terra cotta tile, and pebbles. Kiesler's design is biomorphic; he intended to create an organic space, rather than a geometric, linear one.

== Theory ==
Kiesler's Endless House was intended to communicate his personal views of metaphysics. In terms of architecture, he included abstract aspects of 'connectivity', 'corealation', and 'biotechnique'. These terms describe abstract ideas, rather than being specific architectural terms.

To show connectivity, Kiesler included curvilinear structure that is built of one material, concrete, with no structural seams in the building. Correalism, the continual interaction between man and nature, meant that Kiesler thought of the rooms of his house as extensions of the bodies of its inhabitants. He explained this in his 1940 article "On Correalism and Biotechnique", published in the Architectural Record.

== MoMA ==
The Endless House was originally commissioned to be built in full scale in the sculpture garden of the Museum of Modern Art. However, a new wing was planned for the museum, which meant that the completed building would only have stood for one year. Instead, Arthur Drexler, director of the museum's department of architecture and design, invited Kiestler to build a scaled down version for his "Visionary Architects" show, which exhibited 20th century architecture that was considered "too revolutionary to build." The exhibit, which opened on September 29, 1960, featured an 8-foot model of the "Endless House", a full-scale photographic mural of the house, and a series of drawings and sketches.

== Artistic influences ==
The original plans for Endless House were presented in Vienna in 1924. At that time, Kiesler was active in the European avant-garde, and a member of the De Stijl group. "Endless House" was influenced by Kiesler's interaction with this group, and aimed to comingle art and life by creating an environment that encouraged the occupant's natural inclination towards art.

When Kiesler moved to New York City in 1926, he took part in the Surrealist movement, which strove to use art to achieve a healthier, natural mental experience. Kiesler's "Endless House" sketches were not determined by any artistic or architectural conventions, and suggested no particular use of the space: rather, they simply attempted to convey a biomorphic shape, open to the possibilities of its inhabitant's intent.

== Critique of Modernism ==
Kiesler, although often paired with Modernist architects, was an outspoken critic of Modernism and the International Style. He was especially critical of the Modernist invocation of functionality, which assumes a specific use for a space according to present conceptions of use and value. He considered his biomorphic design to be not only more natural than Modernists who strove for organicity, but also more practical for future use, due to its indeterminacy. Although "Endless House" was presented in 1960 alongside definitively Modernist architecture projects, it was an implicit critique of Modernism.

== Sources ==
- Efthymios Warlamis. Poetic Architecture
- Realizing the Endless: the work of Juergen Mayer H. And Friedrich Kiesler Surrealism Centre.
- Iain Borden (2000). Intersections: Architectural Histories and Critical Theories. Psychology Press. p. 69. ISBN 978-0-415-23292-0.
