= Coliseum Theatre (Washington Heights) =

Theater in New York City (1920–2020)

- B.S. Moss' Coliseum Theatre; New Coliseum Theatre; Coliseum Cinemas
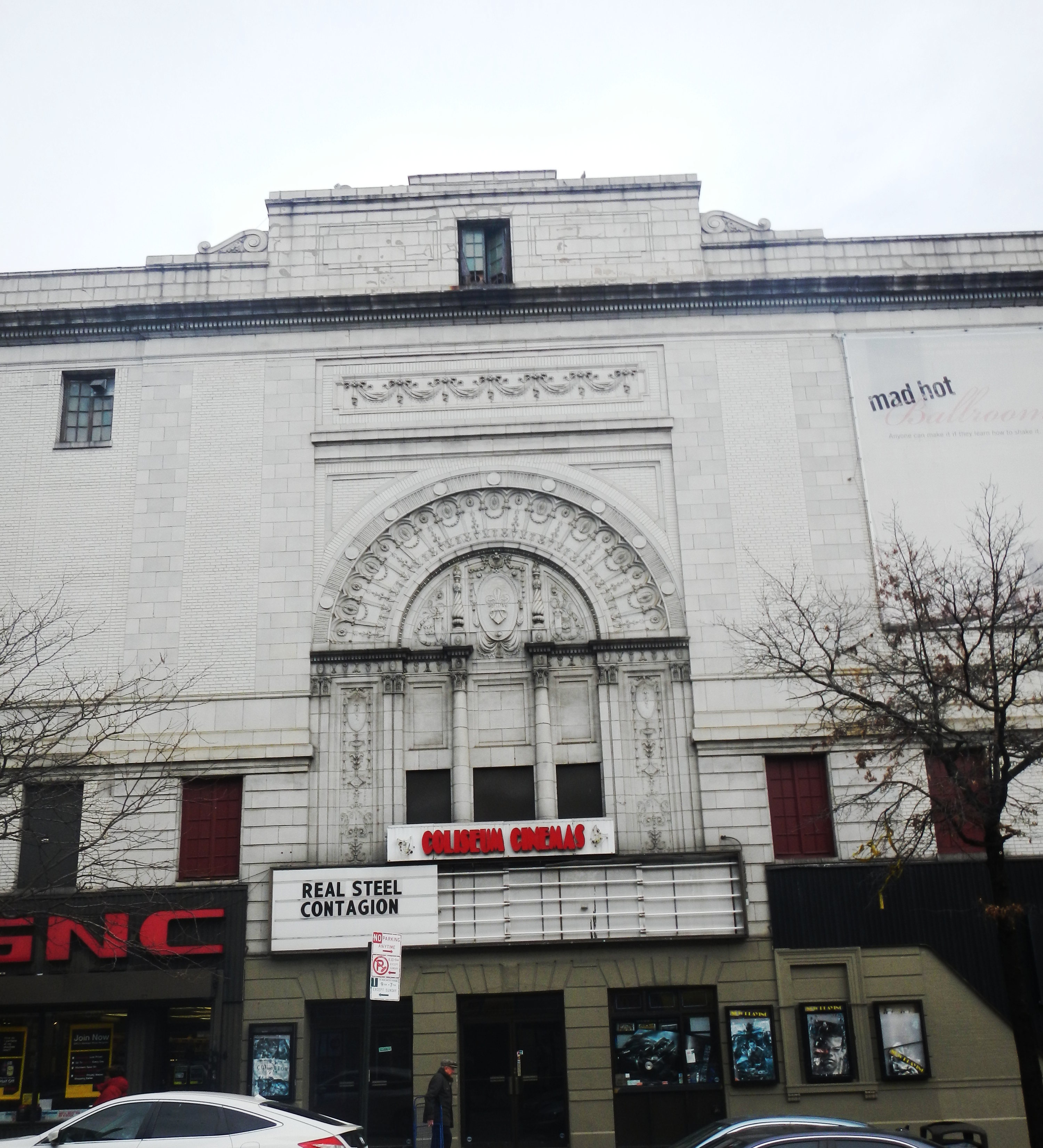
- Coliseum Theatre in 2013
- Interactive map of Coliseum Theatre
- Address: 4260 Broadway; New York City; United States
- Coordinates: 40.850451°N 73.935275°W
- Owner: The Greater New York Vaudeville Theatre Corp
- Capacity: 3,500
- Type: Theatre
- Current use: Demolished

Construction
- Opened: September 30, 1920
- Closed: 2011
- Demolished: 2020
- Years active: 1920–2002; 2004-2011
- Architects: Eugene De Rosa; Percival Raymond Pereira
- Builder: Fleischmann Construction

The Coliseum Theatre was a cultural and performing arts center located at 4260 Broadway between West 181st and 182nd Streets in the Washington Heights neighborhood of Manhattan in New York City. It occupied the majority of the block between Broadway and Bennett Avenue.

The Coliseum Theatre was built on the site of the Blue Bell Tavern, which stood from 1720 to 1915.

Built in 1920 as B.S. Moss' Coliseum Theatre, the venue was originally a movie palace designed by architect Eugene De Rosa. Marble interiors were done by Voska, Foelsch, & Sidlo Inc, terra cotta by New York Architectural Terra-Cotta Company, ornamental plastering by Architectural Plastering Company, Inc., Peter Clark installed the rigging system, windows supplied by S. H. Pomeroy Company, Inc., Sexauer & Lemke Inc. installed the ornamental iron work, draperies and wall coverings by Louis Kuhn Studio, mirrors & console tables by Nonnenbacher & Co, and the pipe organ was installed by M. P. Moller.

The Coliseum was launched by Bow Tie Cinemas before being taken over by RKO Pictures. It housed many vaudeville acts, including The Marx Brothers, W.C. Fields, Eddie Cantor, Uncle Don’s Kiddie Show, and Gertrude Berg.

During the 1980s, a local arts group wanted to rejuvenate the Coliseum as a community arts center, and put on a fundraiser benefit performance Salute to Ol' Vaudeville. It also was the site of the Dominican Film Festival and Children's Film Festival before closing.

In 2011, the building was denied landmark status, and a shopping mall was slated to be opened after demolition. The theater was demolished in 2020.

== Gallery ==
Gallery

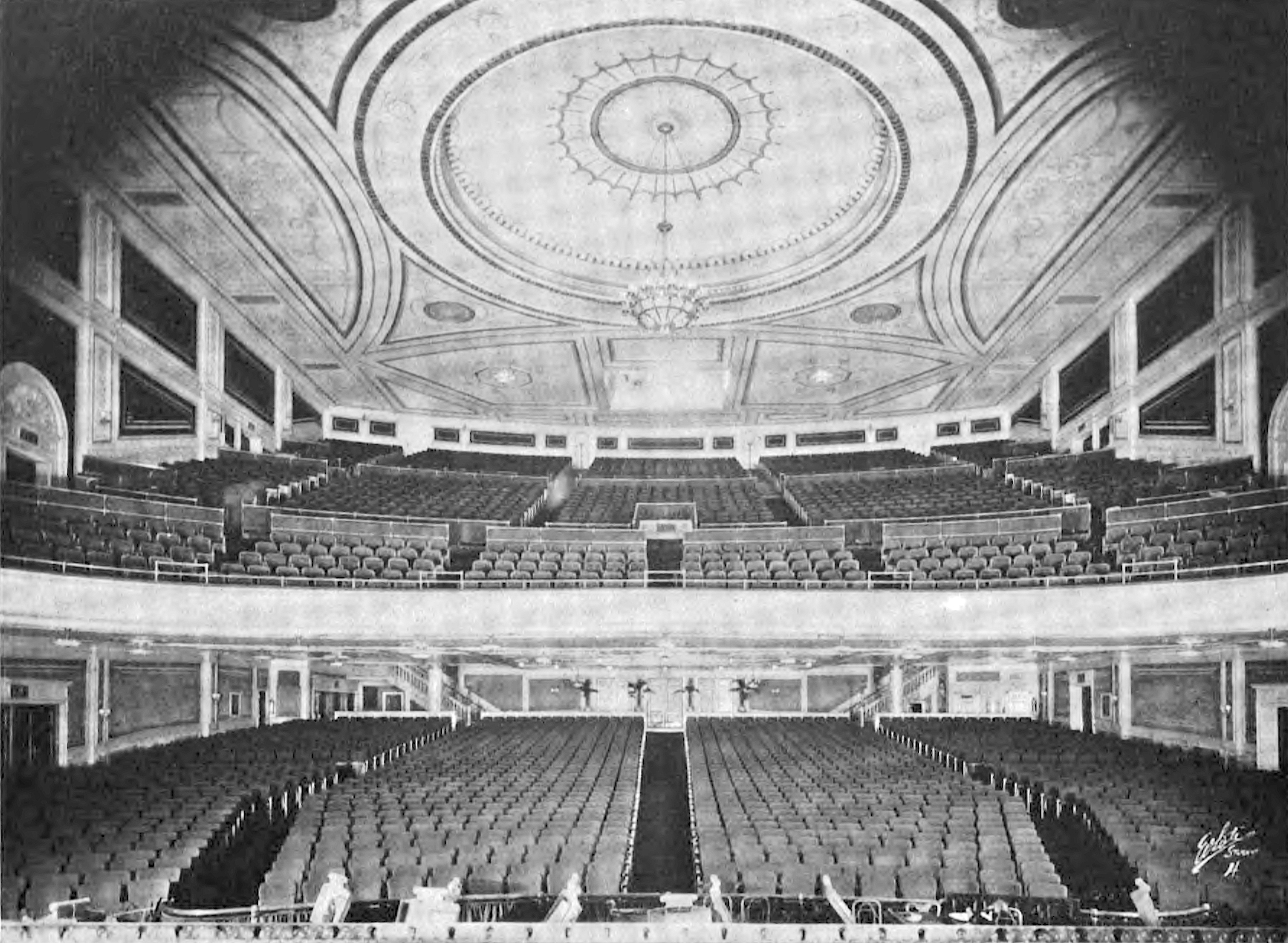

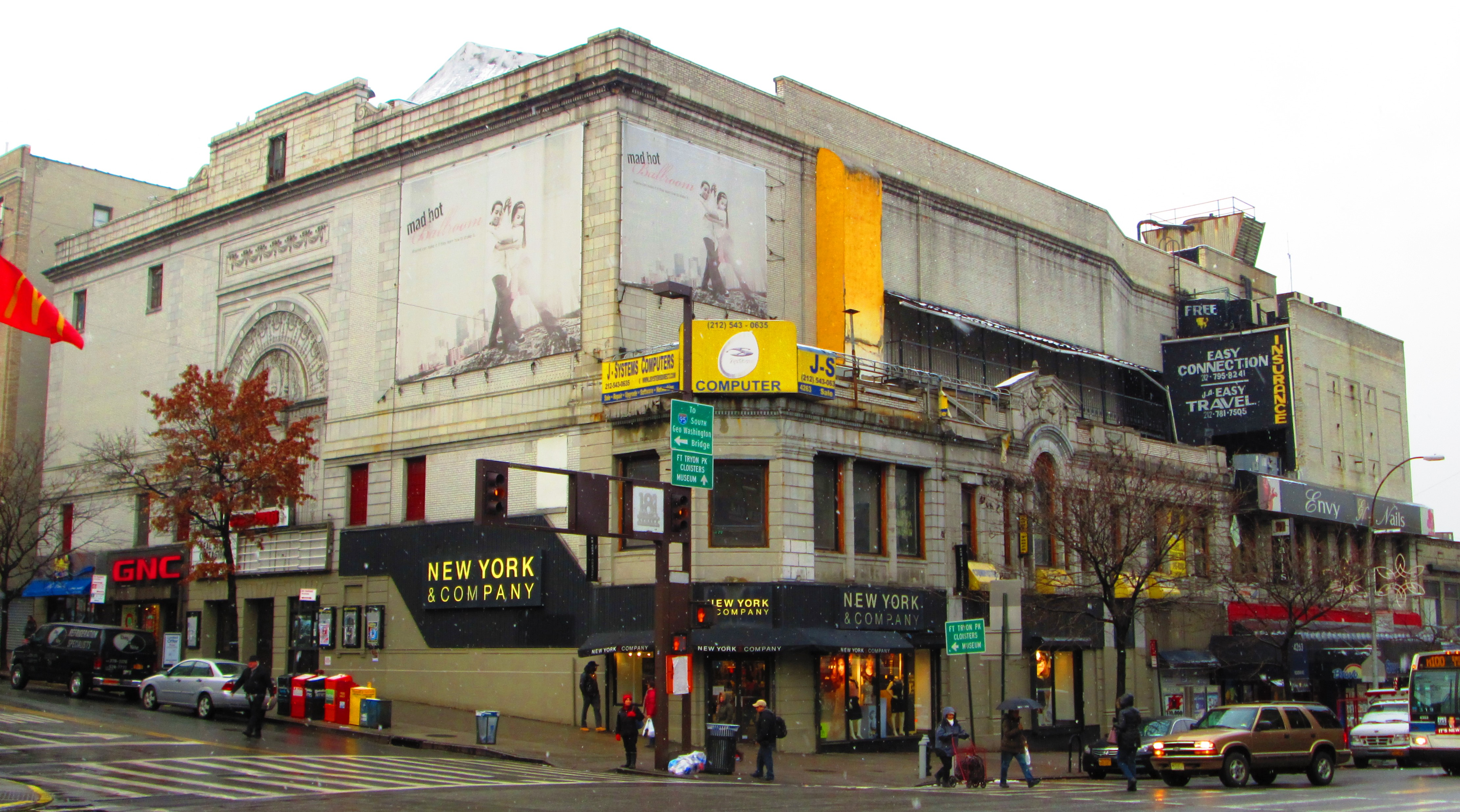

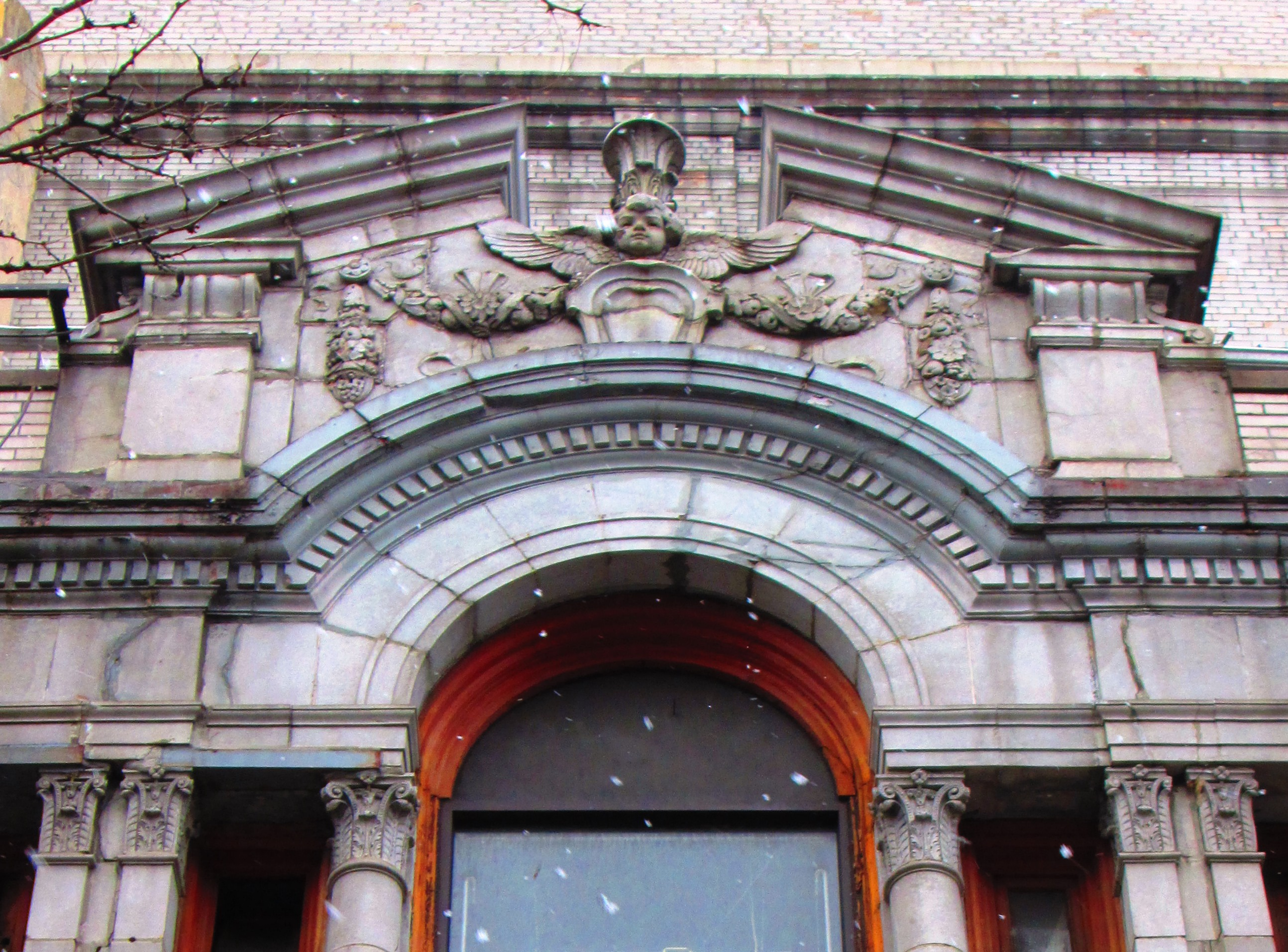

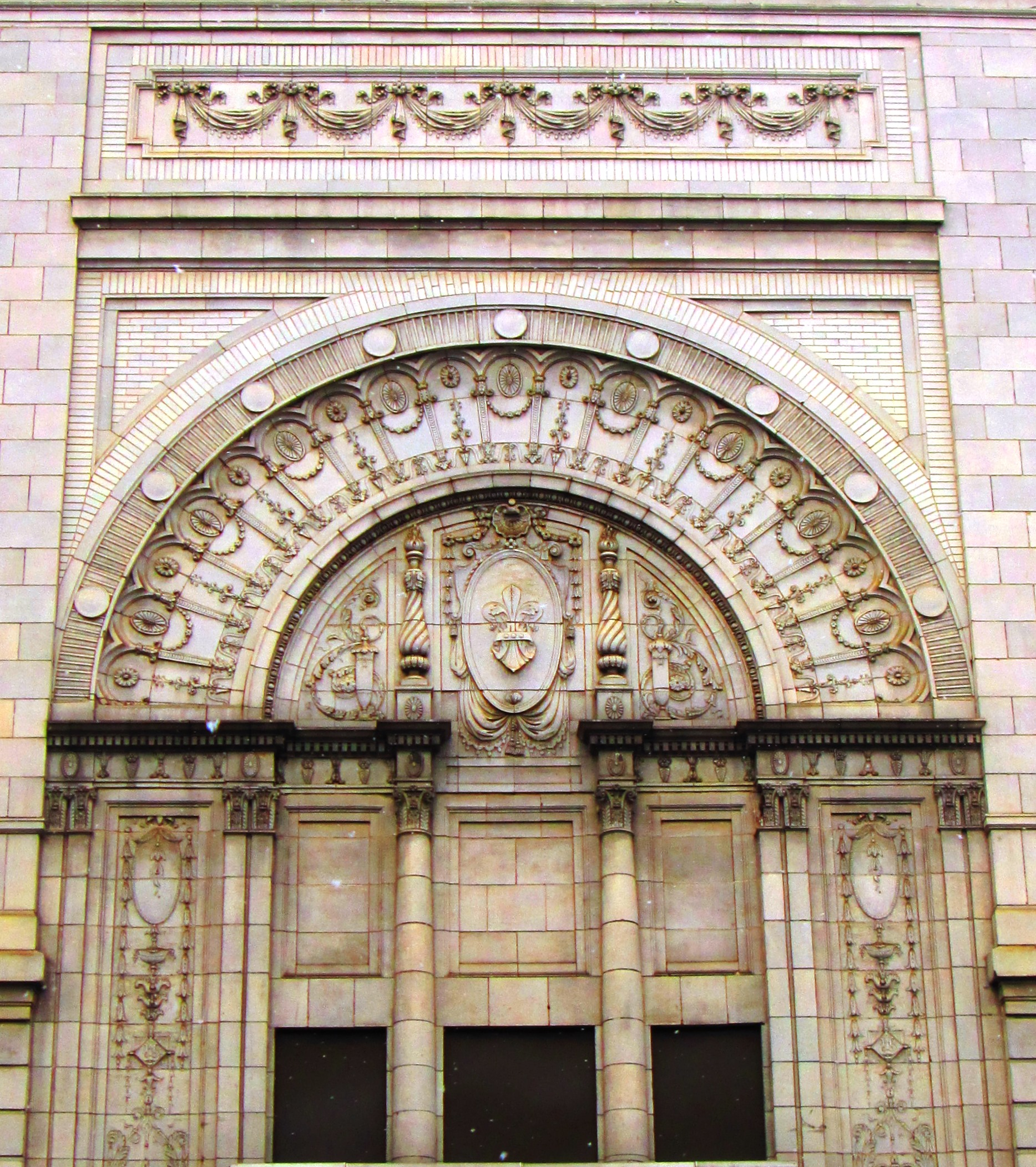

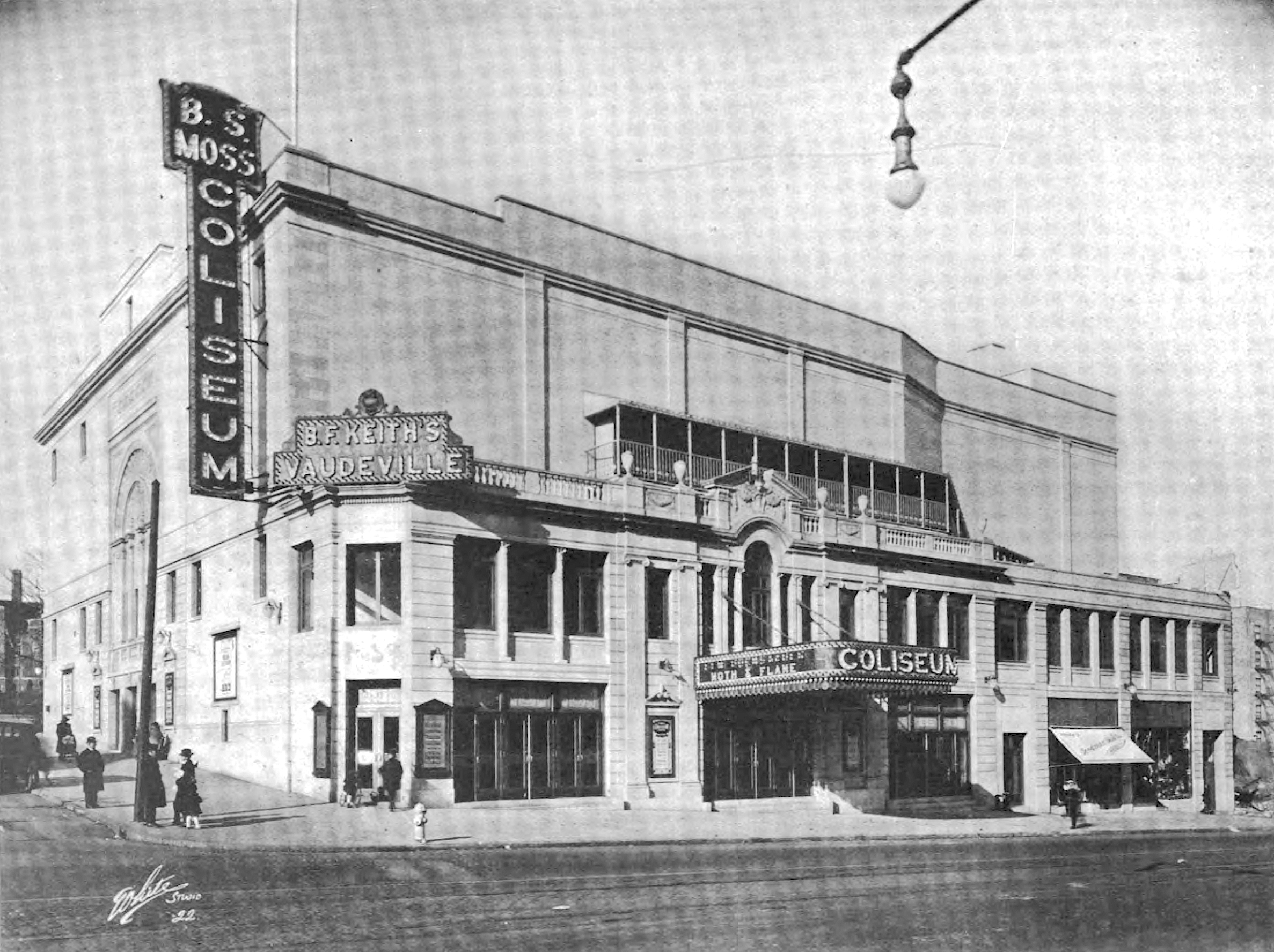

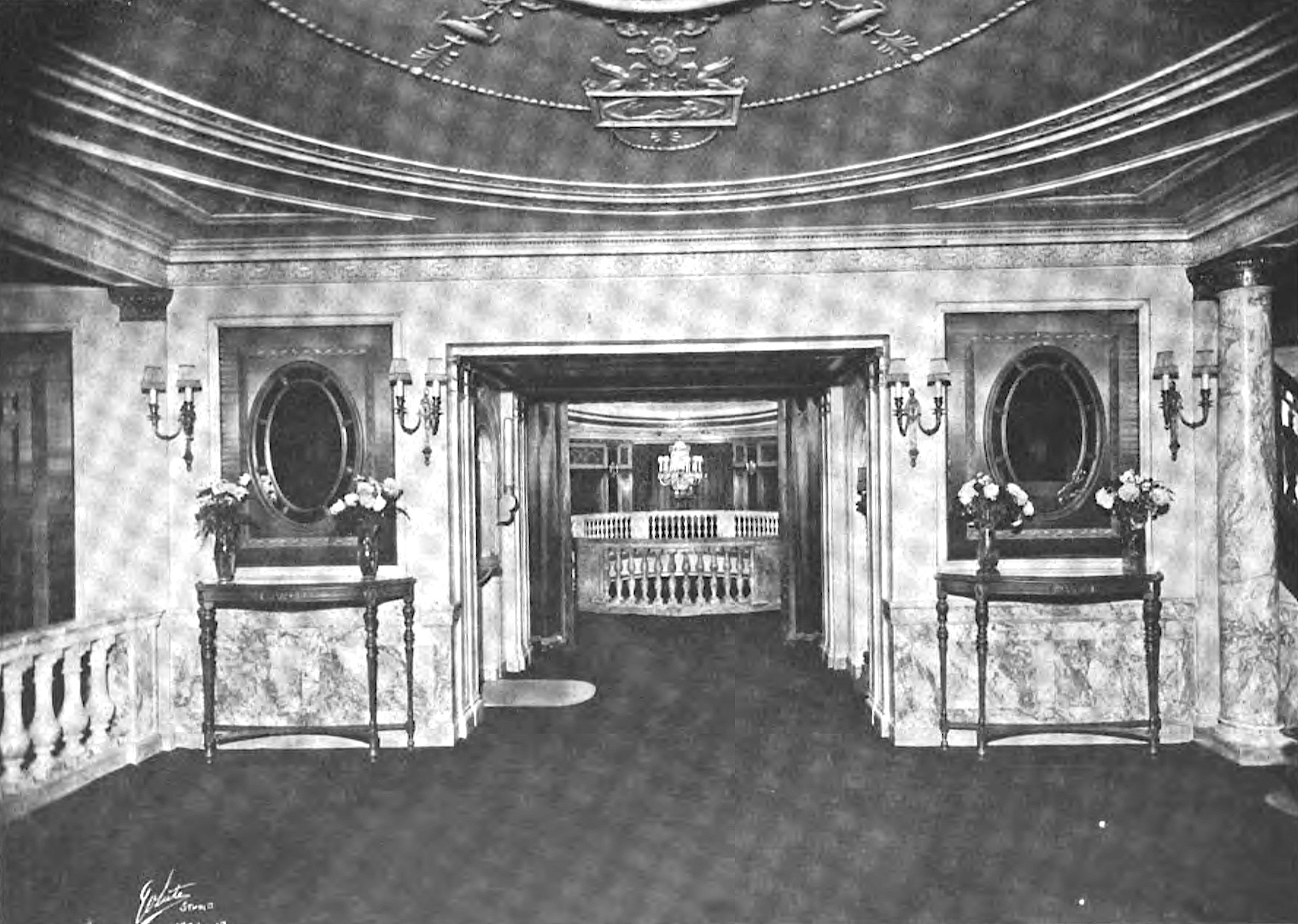

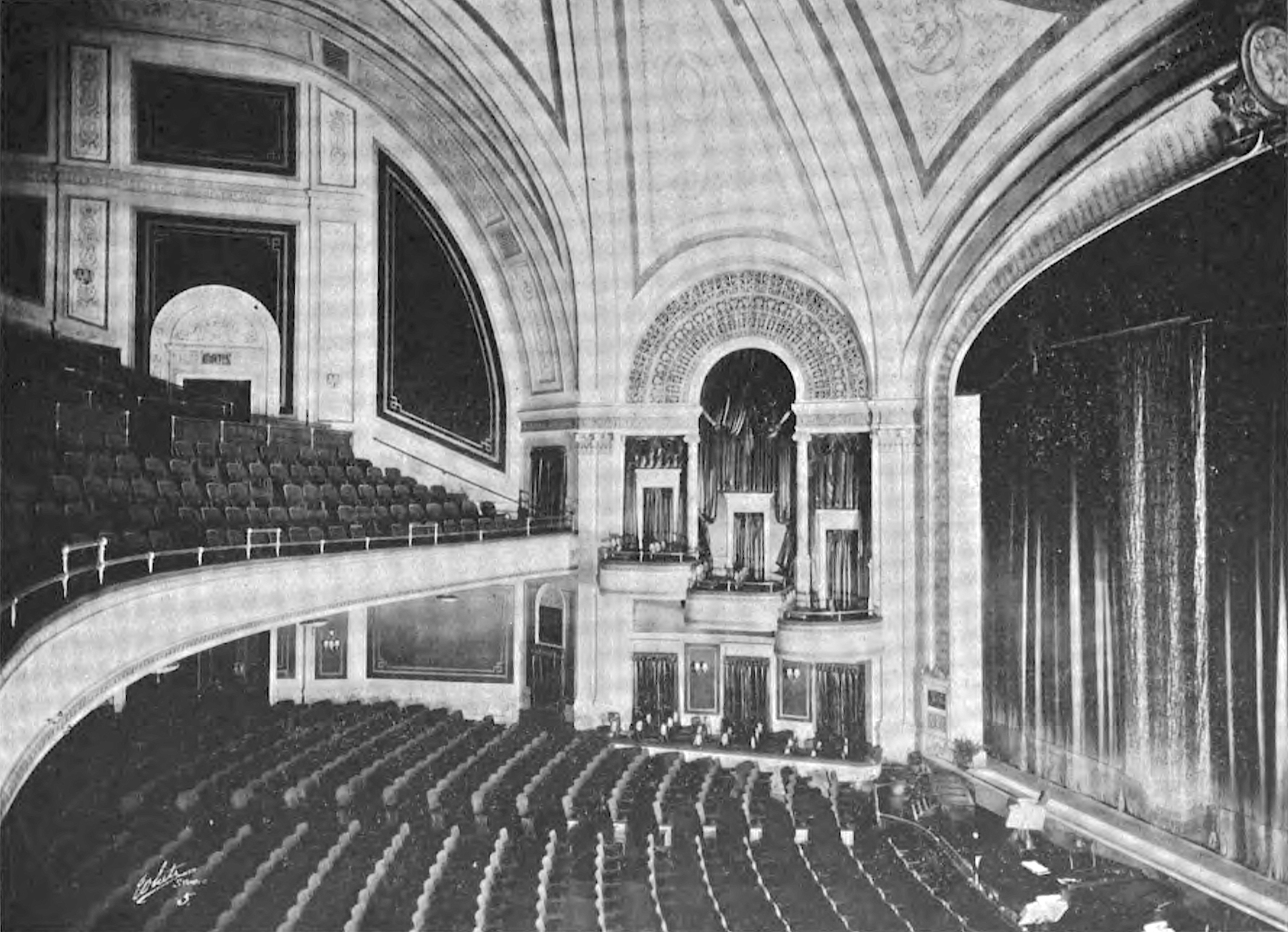

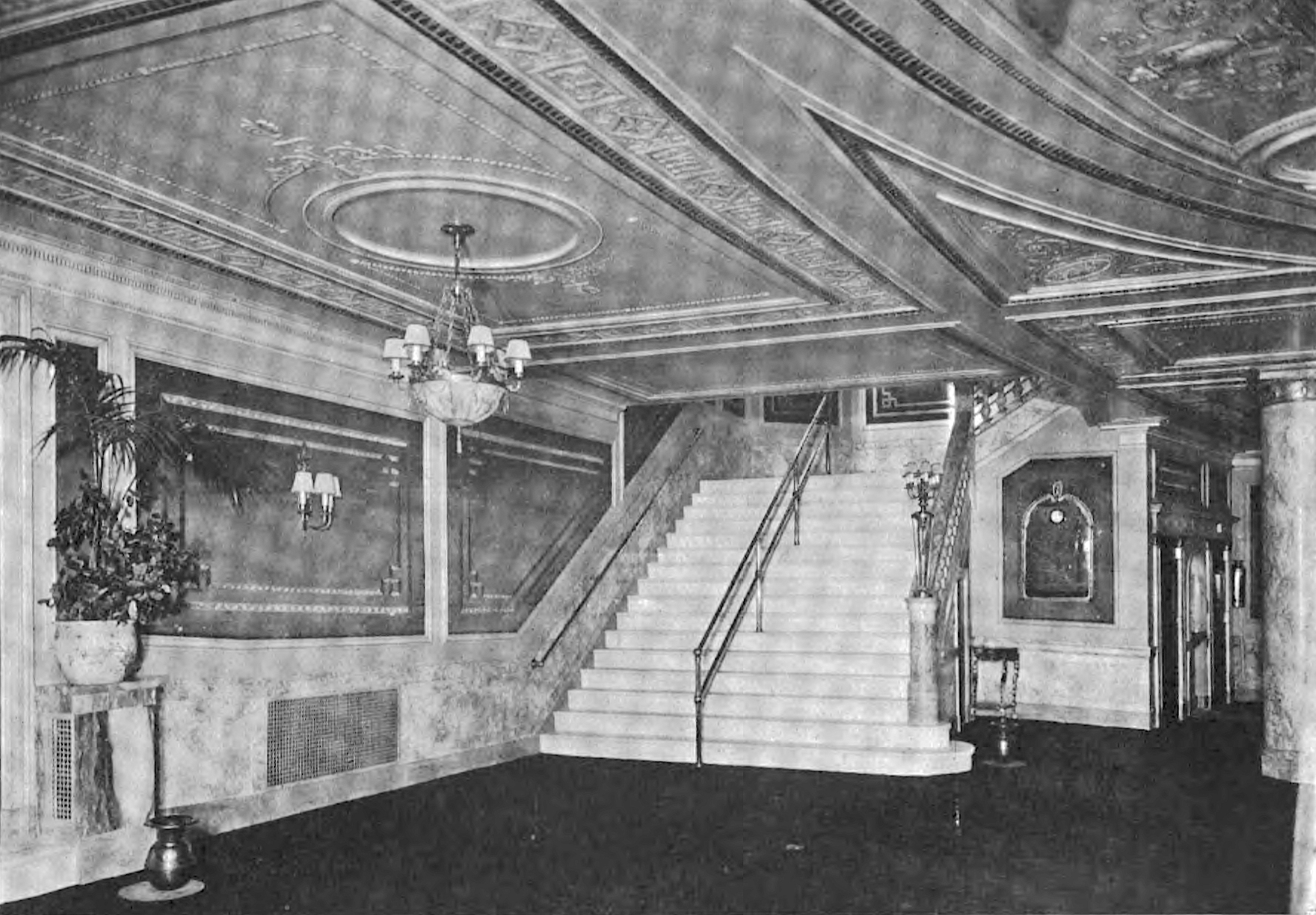
