= Lafayette Theatre (Suffern) =

Movie palace in Suffern, New York, U.S.

Coordinates: 41.1148°N 74.1501°W

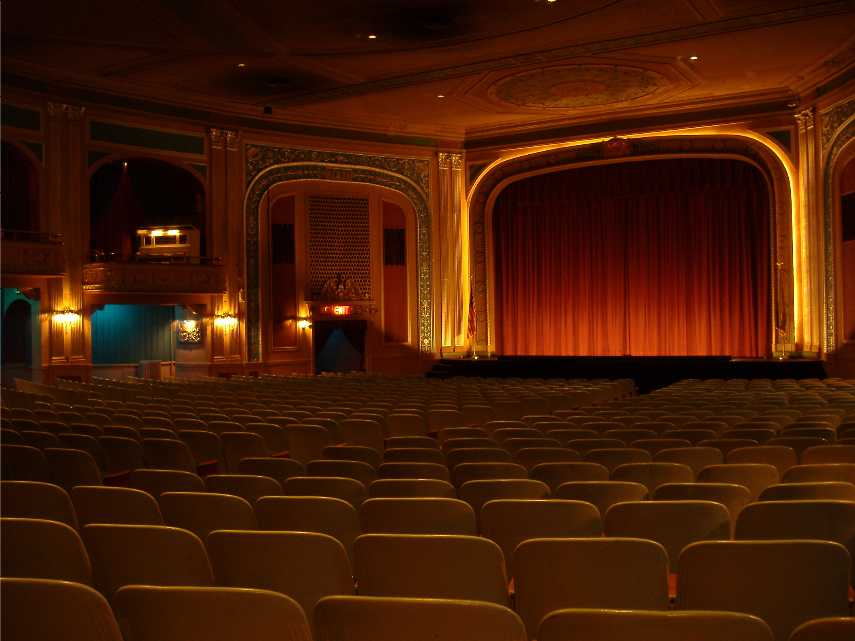
Stage of the Lafayette Theatre in 2005, as seen from the back row of the loge section.

The Lafayette Theatre is a nationally acclaimed movie palace located in downtown Suffern, New York, built in 1923. Its primary function is first-run movies, but it also houses special events like its popular weekly Big Screen Classics film shows. It is also notable for housing a Wurlitzer theatre organ, which is played before Big Screen Classics shows.

== History ==
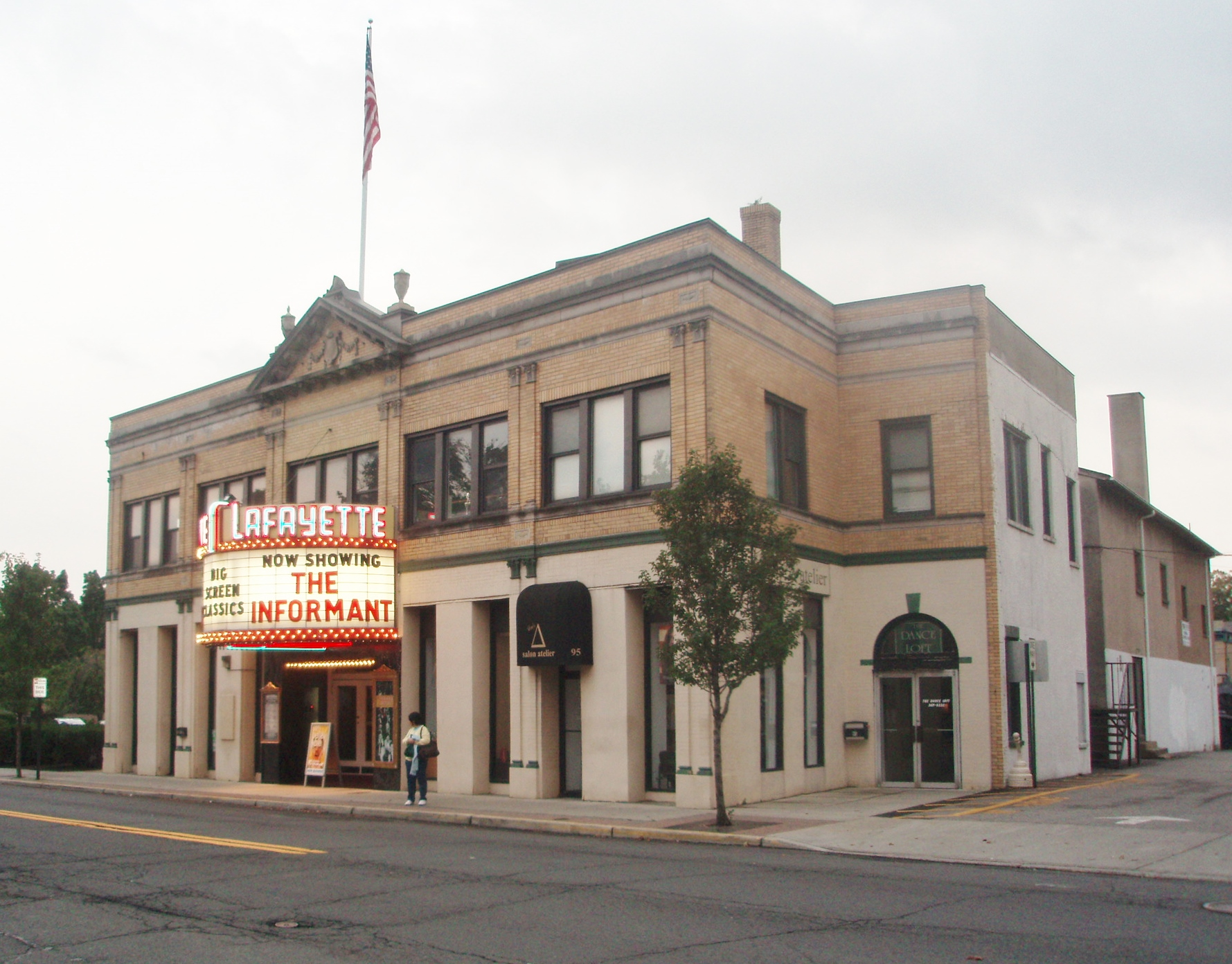
Lafayette Theater exterior

The Lafayette Theatre was named for Revolutionary War hero Marquis de Lafayette who fought, along with General George Washington, in Suffern and the Town of Ramapo. The theater's history began when the Suffern Amusement Company hired noted theatre architect Eugene De Rosa to design a movie theatre for a location on Lafayette Avenue in downtown Suffern. De Rosa's concept was primarily Adamesque, but also with a combination of French and Italian Renaissance influences, subtly mixed in a Beaux Arts style. The theatre was also equipped with a custom-designed Möller pipe organ to accompany silent films and augment live performances.

The Lafayette opened its doors in 1924 with the silent film classic Scaramouche and flourished through the rest of the 1920s with a combination of film presentations and live vaudeville shows. A renovation in 1927 added distinctive opera boxes, and shortly thereafter the projection equipment was updated to play sound film. During the mid-1930s, an air-cooling system was installed which forced the removal of the pipe organ. It was during this renovation that the original chandelier was also removed.

After World War II ended, movie-going habits changed with the advent of television. To keep pace with audience expectations, the Lafayette changed, too. Equipment to handle 3-D film was installed in early 1953 and many notable entries in the short-lived 3-D boom played at the Lafayette. Later that year, the Lafayette was the first theatre in Rockland County to install CinemaScope apparatus to show wide-screen, stereophonic-sound movies. The premiere engagement was the Biblical epic The Robe, during the Christmas holiday of 1953.

The Lafayette's popularity declined in the 1950s and 1960s as downtown populations moved further into the suburbs and television took hold as the popular entertainment medium of the day. However, the theater was spared both the wrecking ball and the multiplexing boom, where large single-screen auditoriums were divided into small theatres to accommodate several films at once. As part of a renovation in the late 1980s, the old stage was refurbished and the New York Theatre Organ Society installed a new pipe organ, the Ben Hall Memorial Mighty Wurlitzer.

In the late 1990s, the Lafayette's future as a single-screen neighborhood movie palace was uncertain until Robert Benmosche, a resident of Suffern and chairman of MetLife Insurance (later chairman of AIG), saw the potential of the Lafayette building and purchased the property in 2001, making repairs to the roof and exterior in order to prevent more serious damage from occurring.

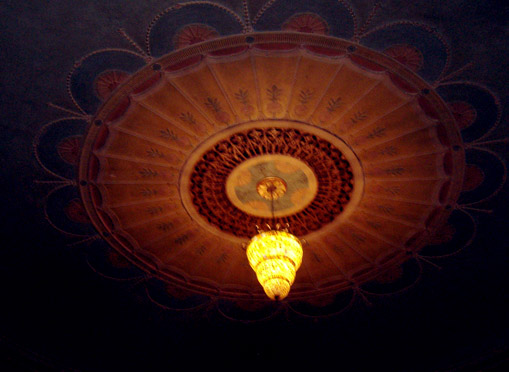
The ornate glass chandelier, installed in 2003.

Late in 2002, the Majestic Star Entertainment Corporation, run by Nelson Page, took a long-term lease to operate the Lafayette Theatre as a single-screen movie theatre, calming any lingering fears that the unique building would be divided into small auditoriums. Page and his team refurbished the interior of the theatre, bringing back its luxurious pre-war style while investing it with modern projection equipment and concession areas. In September 2003, an ornate chandelier was added to the ceiling of the Lafayette for the first time since the 1930s.

The Lafayette is currently a modern example of a single-screen neighborhood theater and remains a popular landmark of Rockland County. While continuing to run first-run films every day, the Lafayette also runs alternative programming to keep up with changing tastes in entertainment. A weekly series of classic film presentations began in the spring of 2003, taking place on Saturday mornings, bringing in hundreds of film buffs every week.

In 2013, the theater was taken over by JACA Entertainment under Ari Benmosche, and has continued to function as a single screen movie theater till this day.

=== Wurlitzer organ ===
The theatre organ, which is owned and maintained by the New York Theatre Organ Society (NYTOS), is played every Friday and Saturday night, and is a favorite feature before the Big Screen Classics presentations on Saturday mornings. The main house organist was Jeff Barker from 2002 until his death in 2013.

Wurlitzer Opus 2095 left the Wurlitzer factory on January 31, 1931, and was installed in the Lawler Theatre in Greenfield, Massachusetts. It was the last Style 150 (2 manuals and 5 ranks) that Wurlitzer built. Like so many small-town movie theatres in the 1950s and 1960s, the Lawler was closed for demolition. The organ was moved to the Rainbow Roller Rink in South Deerfield, Mass., where it was rarely used.

The owners of the rink sold it to Ben Hall, noted theater historian and film critic. He, with the help of some friends, removed it in 1968 and installed it in his New York City duplex. Hall died in 1971 and the organ was once again "orphaned".

When the estate of Ben Hall donated the instrument to the American Theatre Organ Society, the organ was shipped to California, where it was to be installed in the proposed Harold Lloyd Estate museum. Unfortunately, the plans for the museum fell through and the organ was shipped back to New York City where NYTOS installed it in the Carnegie Hall Cinema. Opus 2095 played in the Carnegie Hall Cinema for over ten years until the restoration of Carnegie Hall. During restoration, the Carnegie Hall Cinema was twinned, and the organ was removed and placed in storage.

When Al Venturini and the Good Samaritan Hospital began working together to fix up the Lafayette Theatre, Dave Kopp, then chairman of NYTOS, contacted Venturini about the possibility of installing the organ. Everyone agreed that the Lafayette Theatre was an ideal place for the organ. Work began in November 1990, and after countless hours of labor by the volunteer crew and nearly $20,000 in donated funds, the organ was reborn. Wurlitzer Opus 2095 played for the first time in its new home in December 1992. Since then, it has been entertaining the weekend audiences at the Lafayette Theatre in the grand tradition of the American Theatre Organ.

== Honors ==
The Lafayette was named one of the "10 Great Places to Revel in Cinematic Grandeur" by USA Today in January 2005, sharing the list with such notable venues as New York City's Ziegfeld Theatre and Grauman's Chinese Theatre in Hollywood.
