= Internationale Ausstellung neuer Theatertechnik =

The Internationale Ausstellung neuer Theatertechnik (International Exhibition of New Theatre Technique) was an avant-garde event embracing theatre and cinema organised by Friedrich Kiesler in Vienna during the Musik- und Theaterfestes der Stadt Wien.

The opening ceremony was interrupted by Jacob L. Moreno, who accused Kiesler of plagiarism as regards the "space stage" which Moreno claimed was derived from his "Stegreiftheater" (Theatre of Spontaneity).

The event included The Sword of Attila, a play by Alma Mahler and Ernst Fischer, a lecture by Karl Kraus and world premieres by Arthur Schnitzler and Arnold Schoenberg.
