= Rogier van der Heide =

Dutch designer

- Born: 1970 (age 55–56); Bennebroek, the Netherlands
- Occupation: Architect
- Awards: IALD Radiance Award; Lighting Designer of the Year Award; International Lighting Designer Award of Excellence; Edison Award of Excellence; Red Dot Award Best of the Best iF Gold Award; FX Design Award
- Projects: Star Place, Kaohsiung, Taiwan; Galleria West, Seoul, South Korea; Amsterdam Public Library, Amsterdam, the Netherlands; Wellcome Wing at the Science Museum, London, UK; California Academy of Sciences, San Francisco, USA; Prada Fall Winter 08–09 Fashion Show, Milan, Italy
- Design: Galleria West, Seoul; Sheikh Zayed Bridge, Abu Dhabi; YAS Marina Hotel, Abu Dhabi, Star Place, Kaohsiung

Rogier van der Heide (born 1970 in Bennebroek, the Netherlands) is a designer born in the Netherlands who lives in Liechtenstein. He is noted especially as a C-suite design executive and as a lighting designer of public and commercial projects all over the world.

== Life ==
Van der Heide grew up in the village of Bennebroek, close to the beach in the Netherlands. During high school, he already created plays, musical, radio programs and movies. Van der Heide studied at the Institut Supérieur des Beaux-Arts "St. Luc" in Brussels, Belgium, and the Amsterdam School of the Arts, the Netherlands. He worked until 2003 as an independent designer before joining the design and consulting practice, Arup. In December 2007, Metropolis Magazine included a feature on him, describing him as "Arup's Brilliant Master of Light".

Besides his work as a designer, Rogier is co-founder and artistic director of the Amsterdam Light Festival.

== The early years: theatre design ==
In 1989, Rogier van der Heide started working as a theatre lighting designer in the Netherlands, designing the lighting for a number of Dutch theatre groups and the productions of author and director, Geert Kimpen. In 1990 he joined the Amsterdam-based design practice, Hans Wolff & Partners, who, at that time, specialized in architectural lighting design and theatre consulting. Most notably, Rogier van der Heide worked for HW&P on the renovation of the Royal Flemish Opera in Ghent, Belgium. In 1994, van der Heide left the practice and became a founding principal at the Hollands Licht Advanced Design, a practice that he would own, lead and direct for ten years.

== 1994–2003: architectural lighting design ==
The Hollands Licht practice completed projects in London, Tokyo, Amsterdam and other cities worldwide. Other international projects included: The UK's National Museum of Science and Industry's Welcome Wing (1999, architect Sir Richard MacCormac), the Mind Zone in the Millennium Dome (1999), Renzo Piano's Academy of Sciences in San Francisco (2002 and onwards) and Hani Rashid's Hydrapier Pavilion in the Netherlands (2002).

He received several awards during the Hollands Licht period including the Edison Award of Excellence (2000), and the Lighting Designer of the Year Award (1999) presented by the magazine, Lighting Dimensions, of New York City. The practice's most recently completed work, Sheikh Zayed Bridge in Abu Dhabi, was not finished until 2011, over ten years after the Abu Dhabi Municipality commissioned the lighting design.

== 2004–2010: Arup ==
Van der Heide joined the Arup practice in 2004, and subsequently worked on projects including Star Place in Taiwan and Galleria West in South Korea, both in collaboration with Ben van Berkel and the 2004 Architecture Biennale show in Venice in collaboration with Hani Rashid of Asymptote. He was a Director with Arup. He was also Arup's Global Leader of the lighting design business.

In 2005, van der Heide was the first European designer to receive International Association of Lighting Designer's Radiance Award, the most prestigious accolade in the industry. For his Louis Vuitton work, he received the International Lighting Design Award of Excellence in 2006.

Recent projects by van der Heide are the Al Raha Beach Tower in Abu Dhabi with architect Asymptote, Dubai Maritime City Landmark Tower with architect Nikken Sekkei, the YAS Marina Hotel in Abu Dhabi, work for the Tate Modern in London and work for various fashion retailers. During his time at Arup, most of Rogier's work was executed in close collaboration with his team in Amsterdam or Arup Lighting in London. The practice has got other lighting design teams in New York, San Francisco, Berlin, Melbourne, and Tokyo.

In 2008, together with his students of the Amsterdam University of Applied Sciences, van der Heide created the light sculpture "Force Field" in London. In 2010, he developed one of the art installations for Swarovski at the Salone del Mobile in Milan, Italy.

== 2010-2014: member of the Philips Lighting leadership ==
From 1 March 2010 until 31 July 2014, Rogier van der Heide was vice president and chief design officer of Philips Lighting. The job of a chief design officer is to make design contribute maximum to the value of the business. Besides, Van der Heide continues to grow his portfolio of design projects:

- Costumes for the band Black Eyed Peas in 2011
- The design "Dream Cloud" for Swarovski in 2010
- Lighting for the cinematographic production "A Day in the Life of the Castle" with Peter Greenaway in 2012
- Lighting objects for the Conservatory of Music "Prins Claus" of Groningen, the Netherlands in 2014
- The exhibition "Lightopia" with Vitra Design Museum in 2014
- The artistic direction of the Amsterdam Light Festival

Under the design leadership of Rogier van der Heide, Philips Lighting has received over 45 international design awards such as Red Dot and iF product design award. Though this is respectable, the key responsibility of a Chief Design Officer is not to gain recognition in the field of design, but to translate the technological advancements into meaningful applications that make sense in everyday life. To accomplish this, Rogier van der Heide follows an unconventional approach, that can be characterized as "disruptive" and "passionate" and is based on open innovation.

== Recent Architectural Lighting Design ==
- 2017 the Seoul Sky Garden or "Seoullo 7017" opened in Seoul, Korea. The architecture by MVRDV transforms an old highway that crosses the city into a botanical garden. Rogier van der Heide designed a deep blue lighting scheme that offers visitors a scenic experience at night. In collaboration with Nanam ALD.
- 2013 the New Rijksmuseum in the Netherlands opened April 2013. Rogier van der Heide worked in total during 15 years on the lighting design of the museum. As of 2011, the lighting became a collaborative effort with Royal Philips where Rogier has been working as Chief Design Officer since 2010. The lighting design for the Rijksmuseum comprises nearly 4,000 LED luminaires that are individually, wirelessly controlled. It also includes the natural light design, that Rogier developed in collaboration with the team at Arup Lighting between 2006 and 2007.
- 2012 the Stedelijk Museum in Amsterdam, one of the world's foremost museums of modern art, re-opened with a lighting design by Rogier van der Heide. The architects of the extension are Benthem Crouwel of Amsterdam.

== 2014–onwards: Zumtobel Group ==
15 September 2014 Zumtobel Group of Austria announced that Rogier van der Heide has been appointed at Chief Design Officer and Chief Marketing Officer as of 1 December 2014. Corporations such as Nike, Apple and many automotive manufacturers recognize the way design and marketing influence each other. Zumtobel Group, a supplier of architectural lighting, has decided to combine the two responsibilities in one position.
