= Eugene De Rosa =

American architect (1894–1945)

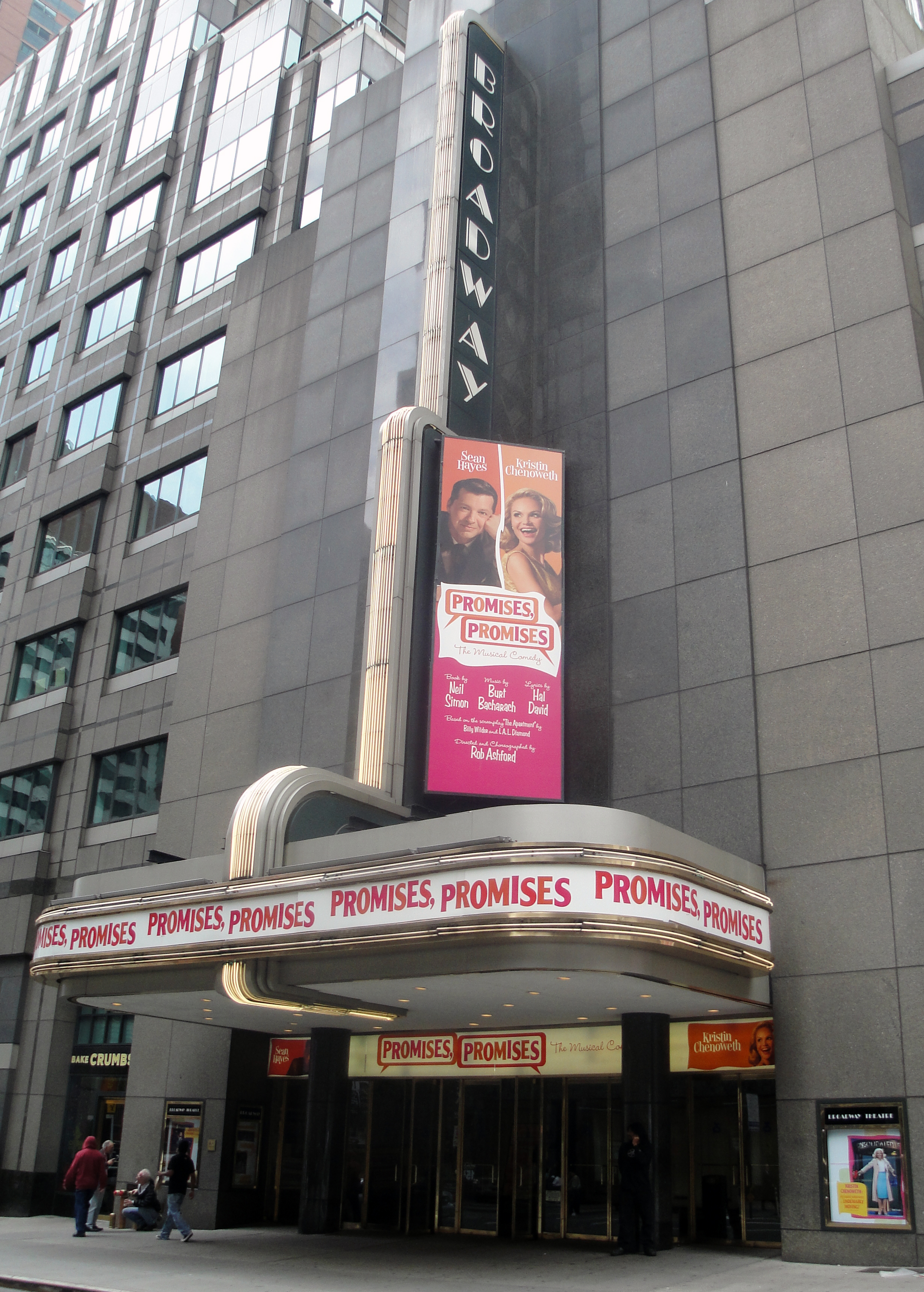
- De Rosa's Broadway Theatre on 53rd Street, built in 1924 and pictured in 2010
- Born: Eugene De Rosa; 1894; Calabria, Italy
- Died: 1945 (aged 50–51)
- Occupation: Architect
- Buildings: Apollo Theatre, Broadway Theatre, Gallo Opera House

Eugene De Rosa (born Eugenio De Rosa; 1894 – c. 1945) was an Italian American architect. He worked in New York City and specialized in the design of theatres.

De Rosa's business flourished from 1918 to 1929, particularly during the Roaring Twenties, but it largely declined during the Great Depression. During the 1930s he spent some years in London and settled for a while in Naples. Toward the end of World War II he was reported to be back in New York and beginning to work on post-war theatre projects, just before his death.

== Early life ==
De Rosa was born in Calabria, in the far south of mainland Italy, in 1894. While he was a small child, his parents emigrated to the United States, arriving through Ellis Island and settling in New York City, where they were living by 1898. De Rosa had four brothers, Felix, Jerry, Vincent, and John; and a sister, Sylvia. His brother Felix also became an architect.

== Career ==
By 1918, De Rosa was practicing as an architect, quickly choosing to specialize in theatre design. An early project was his Vanderbilt Theatre, New York (1918). By 1919 he was in a partnership called "De Rosa & Pereira", and that year he represented several clients in appeals against decisions of the superintendent of buildings of the City of New York.

During the 1920s, De Rosa obtained many more commissions for new theatres. The great driving force during his Roaring Twenties career was "the phenomenal growth in popularity of motion pictures", and his early work included the Times Square Theatre (1920), the Apollo Theatre on 42nd Street (1920), and Klaw Theatre (1921). One important design for a site on Hyatt Street in St. George, Staten Island, provided not just a grand new theatre, the St. George Theatre, but also stores and offices.

De Rosa's business was largely destroyed by the Great Depression of the 1930s, during which he took the opportunity to travel overseas. He spent some years in London and settled for a while in Naples, where in 1935 he was reported to be "wonderfully helpful" to American and English visitors. His brother Felix De Rosa, also an architect, sold insurance during the Depression.

Before or during the World War II, De Rosa returned to New York City, where by 1944 he was working on new theatre projects. However, his death in 1945 prevented the revival of his career.

== Work ==
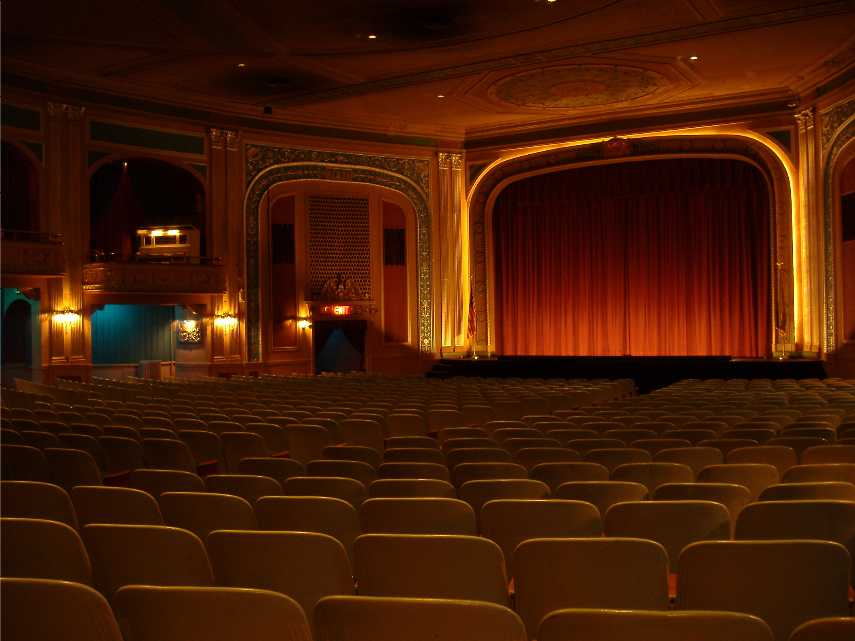
Interior of Lafayette Theatre in 2005

Several of De Rosa's theatres are still standing, among them the 1000-seat Lafayette Theatre, Suffern (1924), an Adamesque building with a combination of French and Italian Renaissance influences ornamented in the Beaux Arts manner. An improvement scheme in 1927 added six distinctive opera boxes and further balcony seating. Unlike many others, the Lafayette was spared from demolition and multiplexing and continues to be used as a single-screen movie theatre.

Another surviving work is the Broadway Theatre, built in New York City in 1924, and originally known as the "B. S. Moss's Colony Theatre".

Gallo Opera House in New York City, built in 1927 for Fortune Gallo, was renamed as the Gallo Theatre, then Studio 52, and since 1977 has been known as Studio 54, a nightclub and theatre.

De Rosa's huge 2,800-seat St. George Theatre in St. George, Staten Island, begun in 1928, cost $500,000 for the theatre alone and was part of a greater development project (an office complex is attached) worth some $2,000,000. The theatre opened on December 4, 1929, only weeks after the Wall Street crash of 1929, and remains in use. It is now owned by St. George Theatre Restoration Inc., a non-profit organization which aims to restore the building and to develop it as a performing arts and cultural center. Most of the ornate interior was designed not by De Rosa but by Nestor Castro.

=== List of theatres ===
- 43rd Street Theatre, Sunnyside, Queens (1938), closed 1952
- Apollo Theatre, 126 Clinton St, New York (1926), closed after 1950, demolished
- Apollo Theatre, 42nd Street, New York (1920; demolished 1996)
- Belmont Theatre, 48th Street, New York (1918), demolished in 1951
- Bijou Theatre, 193 Avenue B, New York (1926), renamed Charles Theatre (1950), closed 1972, is now a church
- The Broadway Theatre, New York (1924, still in use)
- B.S. Moss Cameo Theater, 42nd Street (1921), demolished
- Cameo Theatre, 138 West 42nd, New York (1921), renamed Bryant (1938), 1970s became an adult film, closed in 1983
- Capitol Theater, Jamaica, Queens (1926), renamed Cort Jamaica Theater (1928), Werba's in 1929, and later named Carlton Theater (1930), which closed in 1958 and was demolished in 2002 (now the home of PS268).
- Central Theatre, Jersey City (1920; closed in the 1960s and is now defunct)
- Coliseum Theatre (Washington Heights), 4260 Broadway, New York (1920)
- Corona Theatre, Corona, Queens (1927), closed 1956
- Criterion Theatre, New York, 1935 re-design
- Embassy Theatre, 1560 Broadway, New York, (1925)
- Gallo Opera House, New York (1927), later renamed Studio 54
- Gem Theatre, Far Rockaway, Queens (1933), later renamed PIX (1950s), closed in the 1970s
- Inwood Theatre, 132 Dyckman New York (1927), closed after 1955
- Kenmore Theatre, Brooklyn, New York (1928–1999), was a theatre before being outfitted into a movie cinema
- Kent Theater, Bronx, New York, (mid 1930s), sold 1991
- Klaw Theatre, 251–257 West 45th Street, New York (1921); in 1929 renamed the Avon; demolished 1954
- Lafayette Theatre, Suffern, New York (1924, still in use)
- Lincoln Theatre, Trenton, New Jersey
- Loew's Yonkers, Yonkers, New York (1928), later renamed Brandt's Yonkers, demolished 1975
- Missouri Theatre, St. Louis, Missouri
- New Apollo Theatre, Yiddish Theatre District, Manhattan (1925), demolished
- New Cataract Theatre, Niagara Falls
- New York Theatre, 1480 Broadway, New York (1939), renamed Globe (1950s), Rialto East (1976), Line 42 (1981), Line 1&2 (1983), Big Apple 1&2 (1984)
- Norworth Theatre, 121-3 West 48th Street (1918), renamed Theatre Parisien (1919), Belmont (1920), demolished 1952
- Open Air Theatre, Far Rockaway, Queens (1919)
- Palestine Theatre, Yiddish Theatre District, Manhattan (1925), renamed Winston (1968), demolished 1972
- Park Lane Theatre, 1726 1st Avenue, New York (1927), closed 1952
- Republic Theatre, Brooklyn, New York (1921), renamed RKO Republic Theatre in 1937
- Ruby Theatre, 107 Rivington Street, Yiddish Theatre District, Manhattan (1925), closed 1940, demolished
- Shubert Jamaica Theatre, Jamaica, Queens (1929), closed 1983
- Stadium Theatre, 2176 3rd Avenue, New York (1921), renamed Sun (1941), closed in 1945
- State Theatre, South Street, Middletown, New York (1921)
- St. George Theatre, St. George, Staten Island (1928–1929, still in use)
- Terminal Theatre, Brooklyn, New York (1925), closed in the 1960s
- Terrace Theatre, 361 West 23rd, New York (1937) demolished
- Tilyou Theatre, Surf Avenue, Brooklyn, New York (1926), closed in 1968, demolished 1973
- Times Square Theatre, New York (1920; still standing, but not in use)
- Trans-Luxe Broadway Theatre, 1603 Broadway, New York (1937), renamed Bryan West (1974), Embassy 49 (1976), Pussycat Cinema (1977), & Grand Pussycat (1985), demolished 1986.
- Uptown Theatre, 4037 Broadway, New York (1926), converted into a supermarket in 1955.
- Vanderbilt Theatre, New York (1918; demolished 1954)

==== Abandoned projects ====
- 8th Street Playhouse (1929), earlier designs
- B.S. Moss, 8th Ave & 22nd Street, (1930)
- Loew's 72nd Street Theatre, 188 East 72nd Street, New York (1926), built with designs by John Eberson in 1927
- Marlboro Theatre, 4915 Broadway, New York (1926), later Mercedes Theatre (1927) for Paramount, and plans in 1936 redrawn but abandoned.
- MP Theatre, 137-9 West 72nd (1931)

==== Alterations ====
- 68th Street Playhouse, 1164 3rd Avenue (1933)
- Garden Theatre, June 1915
- Lenox Lyceum, 621-9 Madison Avenue, August 1911

== Publications ==
- Eugene De Rosa, Selections from the recent work of Eugene De Rosa, architect: 15 West 44th Street, New York (Architectural Catalog Co., 1927)
