= Lise Anne Couture =

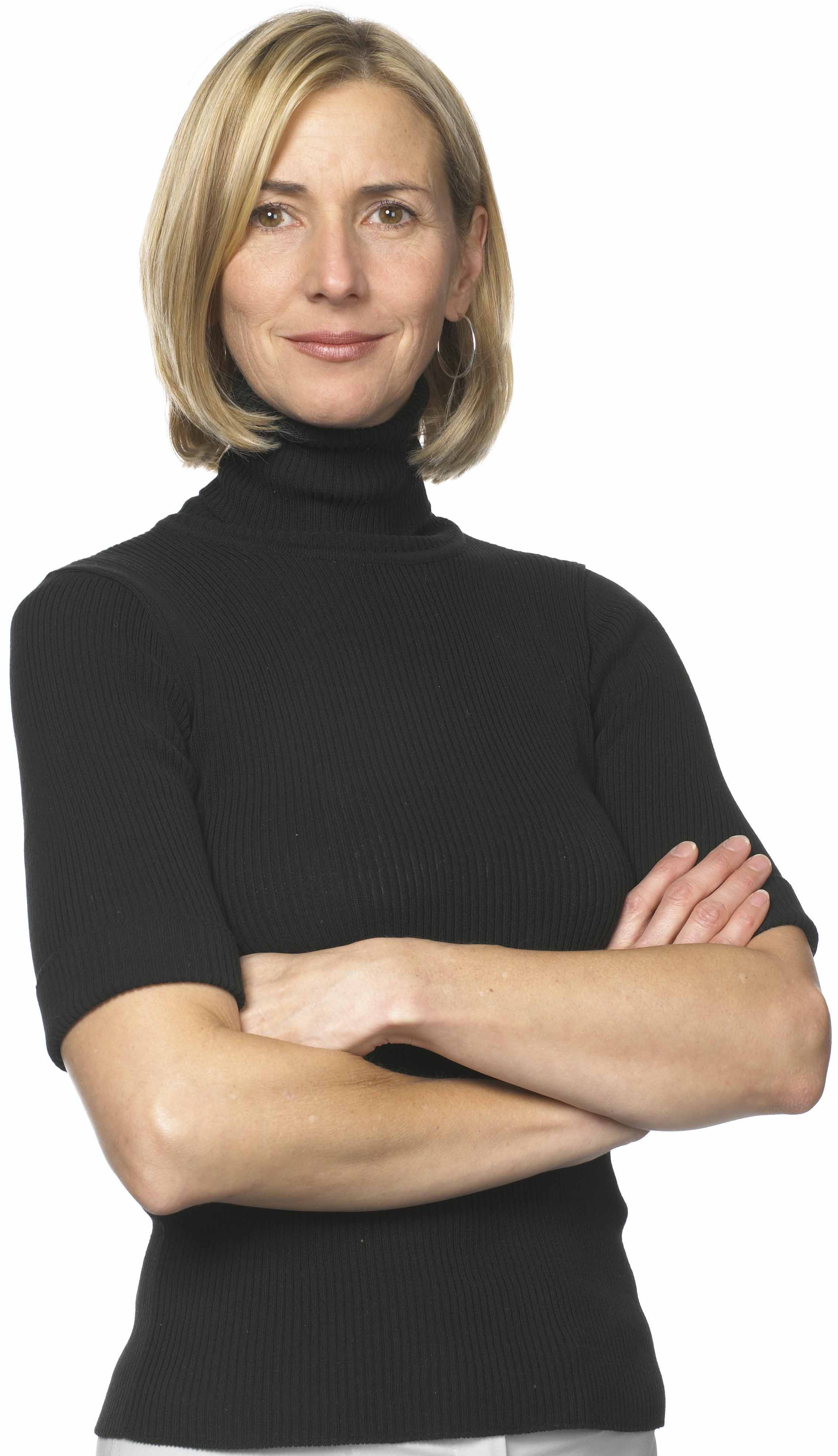
- Born: 1959 (age 66–67)
- Other name: Liseanne Couture
- Education: Carleton University, Yale University
- Known for: Architecture
- Spouse: Hani Rashid

Lise Anne Couture (born in 1959) is a Canadian architect and educator. She is the co-founder of Asymptote Architecture, in partnership with Hani Rashid. She is based in Brooklyn, New York.

== Early life and education ==
Lise Anne Couture was born in 1959 in Montreal, Canada. She attended Carleton University and received a bachelor's degree in architecture in 1983. At Carleton, she met her future husband and business partner, Hani Rashid. She received a Master's of Architecture degree in 1986 from Yale University.

== Architectural work ==
She is co-founder of the New York-based architecture firm Asymptote Architecture, in partnership with Hani Rashid. The architecture firm was founded in 1989.

Couture's work as a principal of Asymptote includes:

- 2009 – 166 Perry Street a luxury residential building in Manhattan's West Village
- 2009 – Yas Hotel Abu Dhabi in Abu Dhabi, United Arab Emirates
- 2002 – HydraPier Pavilion in Haarlemmermeer, Netherlands
- 1996 – Universe Theater in Aarhus, Denmark
- 1997 – Aarhus Museum of Modern Art in Aarhus, Denmark

== Teaching ==
Couture has held numerous academic appointments, including the Bishop Chair and Saarinen Chair at Yale University; the Muschenheim Fellowship at the University of Michigan; the Kenzō Tange Chair for architecture at Harvard's Graduate School of Design; and distinguished visiting professorships at Princeton University, the Southern California Institute of Architecture (SCI-Arc), the University of Virginia, l'Université de Montréal, the Barrage Institute in Amsterdam, Parsons School of Design, and MIT. She has served on the faculty of Columbia University's Graduate School of Architecture, Planning, and Preservation.

In 2009, she held the Davenport Chair at Yale University as a visiting professor, and was the Baird Visiting Professor at Cornell University's College of Architecture, Art & Planning, as well as a visiting professor at Sci-Arc.

Couture has been a New York Foundation of the Arts fellow. She is a New York State registered architect and a member of the AIA. She sits on the board of directors of the Architectural League of New York and the advisory board of the Builders' Association, and serves on the federal government's GSA Design Excellence Peer Review Board.

In 2004, Rashid and Couture were presented with the Frederick Kiesler Prize for Architecture and the Arts in recognition of their contributions to the progress and merging of the disciplines and fields of art and architecture.

== Publications ==
- Hani Rashid, Lise Anne Couture: Asymptote. Architecture at the Interval, Rizzoli 1995, ISBN 0847818616
- Hani Rashid, Lise Anne Couture: Asymptote: Flux, Phaidon Press 2002, ISBN 0714841722
- Hani Rashid, Lise Anne Couture: Asymptote: Works and Projects, Skira 2002, ISBN 888491261X
- Hani Rashid, Lise Anne Couture: Asymptote Architecture Actualizations, Asia Art & Design Cooperation 2010, ISBN 978-7-5609-5599-5
