= Hani Rashid =

Egyptian-born architect

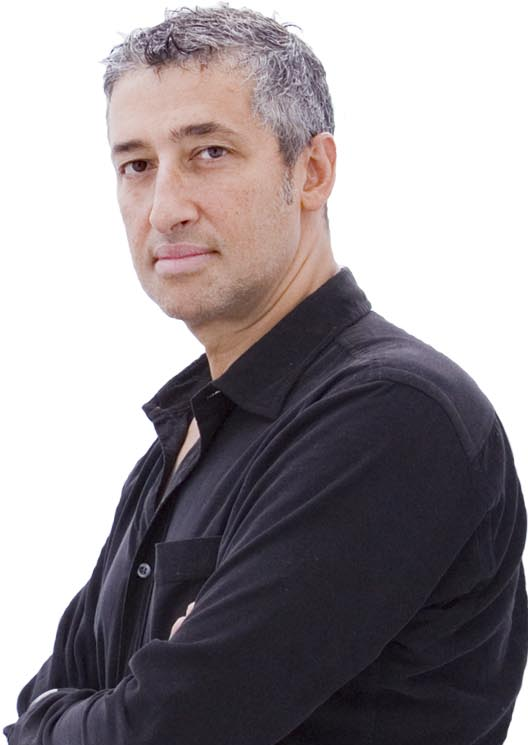
- Born: 1958 (age 67–68); Cairo, Egypt
- Education: Carleton University, Cranbrook Academy of Art
- Occupations: Architect, Educator
- Spouse: Lise Anne Couture
- Relatives: Karim Rashid (brother)

Hani Rashid (born 1958 in Cairo) is an Egyptian-American-Canadian architect and educator. He co-founded the New York-based architecture firm, Asymptote Architecture with Lise Anne Couture.

== Early life and education ==
Hani Rashid was born in Cairo, Egypt in 1958, his family immigrated to Ontario, Canada when he was young. His brother is industrial designer, Karim Rashid.

In 1983, Hani Rashid received his bachelor's degree in Architecture from Carleton University in Canada. It was at Carleton University he met his wife and future business partner, Lise Anne Couture. In 1985, he received a master of architecture degree from the Cranbrook Academy of Art in Bloomfield Hills, Michigan.

== Architectural work ==
Rashid co-founded the New York-based architecture firm, Asymptote Architecture with his wife, Lise Anne Couture in 1989. Asymptote Architecture is known for fusing architecture with computer technology to make a hybrid style.

Significant projects include 166 Perry Street, a luxury residential building in Manhattan's West Village, the Yas Hotel Abu Dhabi a luxury hotel and one of the main architectural features of the new Yas Marina development and accompanying Formula 1 raceway circuit in Abu Dhabi, and the HydraPier Pavilion in Haarlemmermeer, Netherlands.

Portfolio also includes some high-profile interior work such as the New York Stock Exchange Advanced Trading Floor, the American flagship stores for Carlos Miele and Alessi and the Carlos Miele Store in Paris.

Other projects include the winning entry for the World Business Center Solomon Tower in Busan, South Korea in 2007, a large-scale cultural, hotel and performing arts complex in Penang, Malaysia and the Strata Tower in Abu Dhabi.

== Teaching ==
Rashid's academic career includes visiting professorships at several universities, including the Royal Danish Academy of Fine Arts in Copenhagen, the Southern California Institute of Architecture (SCI-Arc) in Los Angeles, the Harvard University Graduate School of Design, the Berlage Institute in Amsterdam, the University of Michigan (Ann Arbor) and the Lund University.

Since 1989, Rashid has been an Associate Professor of Architecture at the Graduate School of Architecture, Planning and Preservation at Columbia University in New York, where he launched the "Advanced Digital Design" (1992) and the "Digital Design Initiative" (1995). In 2004, he received a professorship at the Cátedra Luis Barragán in Monterrey, Mexico, and from 2006 to 2009 he was a professor at the Swiss Federal Institute of Technology in Zurich.

In 2008, Rashid was the recipient of the Kenzo Tange Visiting Professor Chair at the Harvard University Graduate School of Design. He was also a member of the jury for the Aga Khan Award for Architecture. From 2009 to 2011 he was a guest professor at the School of Architecture at Princeton University.

Since October 2011 Rashid has been a professor at the University of Applied Arts Vienna.

== Select awards ==
In 2000, Rashid represented the U.S. at the Seventh International Architecture Biennale in Venice, Italy. In 2004, Asymptote Architecture was selected as the design architects of Metamorph, the Ninth Venice Architecture Biennale. Also in 2004, Hani Rashid together with his partner Lise Anne Couture was awarded the Austrian Frederick Kiesler Prize for Architecture and the Arts.
