= Asymptote Architecture =

American architecture practice

Asymptote Architecture is an American architecture practice, based in Long Island City, New York. It is known for multidisciplinary architectural designs that often incorporate digital technologies.

== History ==
Husband-and-wife team Hani Rashid and Lise Anne Couture co-founded Asymptote Architecture in 1989. The firm began with building designs in the United States, and subsequently expanded to international projects.

Critics have described Asymptote's architectural style as "futuristic"; the firm is known for fusing architecture with digital computer technology to create a hybrid style. Rashid and Couture believe that the spatial form of a building is what drives its architectural meaning. The firm suggests that its buildings reflect specific attributes of their surrounding environments. For example, the Yas Hotel Abu Dhabi has a fluid, curvilinear form, evoking the concept of speed, since Formula One auto races are held underneath the building. 166 Perry Street, a condominium in the West Village neighborhood of New York City, has a rippling glass façade that evokes a waterfall.

== Projects ==
One of their most famous early designs was their 1988 winning entry for the Los Angeles Westcoast Gateway Competition; an international jury of designers chose their submission, "Steel Cloud," out of more than 150, but when the monument received a poor reception from locals, it was not built due to lack of funding.

In 1992, Asymptote was invited by The New York Times to design a hypothetical building for Times Square.

=== NYSE Virtual Trading Floor ===
In 1997, the New York Stock Exchange (NYSE) commissioned Asymptote to design an environment to visualize the real-time numerical and statistical data related to stock trading, with help from Securities Industry Automation Corporation (SIAC). This represented the first large-capacity, virtual reality environment for the New York Stock Exchange, concurrent with the construction of the Advanced Floor Operations Center on the trading floor of the Wall Street facility. In 1999, the project was completed, and as a result a command center was designed and created with state-of-the-art screens. This work was a very early example of a collaboration between the multiple disciplines of architecture, human–computer interaction, data visualization, and user experience design.

=== Yas Hotel ===
Yas Hotel is located in Abu Dhabi, United Arab Emirates (UAE), and was completed in 2009. The 500-room, 900,000-square-foot hotel is surrounded by a Formula One auto race course, the Yas Marina Circuit. Upon the building’s completion, the location hosted the UAE's first Grand Prix motor race in November 2009. The building is organic is shape and has two 12-story towers. It is said to have been designed to reflect aesthetics often associated with speed and the visual movements in car racing, as well as Islamic art traditions of patterning. This is now named the W Abu Dhabi on Yas Island, and formerly was the Yas Viceroy Hotel Abu Dhabi.

=== Missoni Baia ===
The Missoni Baia is a residential development being developed by the OKO Group, located at 777 NE 26TH Terrace in Miami, Florida.

=== Other architecture projects and works ===
Asymptote's first project built overseas was the 1997 Univers Theatre in Aarhus, Denmark. The project was awarded the Danish building of the year award by the Architects' Association of Denmark.

It also designed the HydraPier Pavilion in Haarlemmermeer, Netherlands. Asymptote built flagship stores for several retailers, including Carlos Miele and Alessi. More recently, Asymptote has constructed several skyscrapers, such as the 190 Váci Budapest Bank Commercial Towers in Budapest, Hungary and FCD Yongsan Landmark Tower in Seoul, South Korea. The company also designs buildings for cultural institutions, shipping terminals, and residential buildings.

In the early 2000s they collaborated with the Knoll furniture company on the A3 office system.

== Exhibitions ==
In the early years of its practice, Asymptote has produced experimental art installations and exhibition design work involving multimedia technologies, such as the Virtual Museum (2000) at the Solomon R. Guggenheim Museum in New York City, DOCUMENTA XI in Kassel, Germany, the Schirn Kunsthalle Frankfurt, and the Ministry of Public Works in Madrid, Spain.

In 2003, Asymptote held its first extensive solo exhibition, a survey of its work at the Netherlands Architecture Institute.
