= The Monkey Talks =

The Monkey Talks may refer to:

- The Monkey Talks (play), Gladys Unger's 1925 English-language version of René Fauchois's 1924 play Le Singe qui parle
- The Monkey Talks (film), 1927 silent film based on Fauchois's play
