= Sam H. Harris Theatre =

Theater in Manhattan, New York (1914–1994)

Coordinates: 40.75638°N 73.98817°W

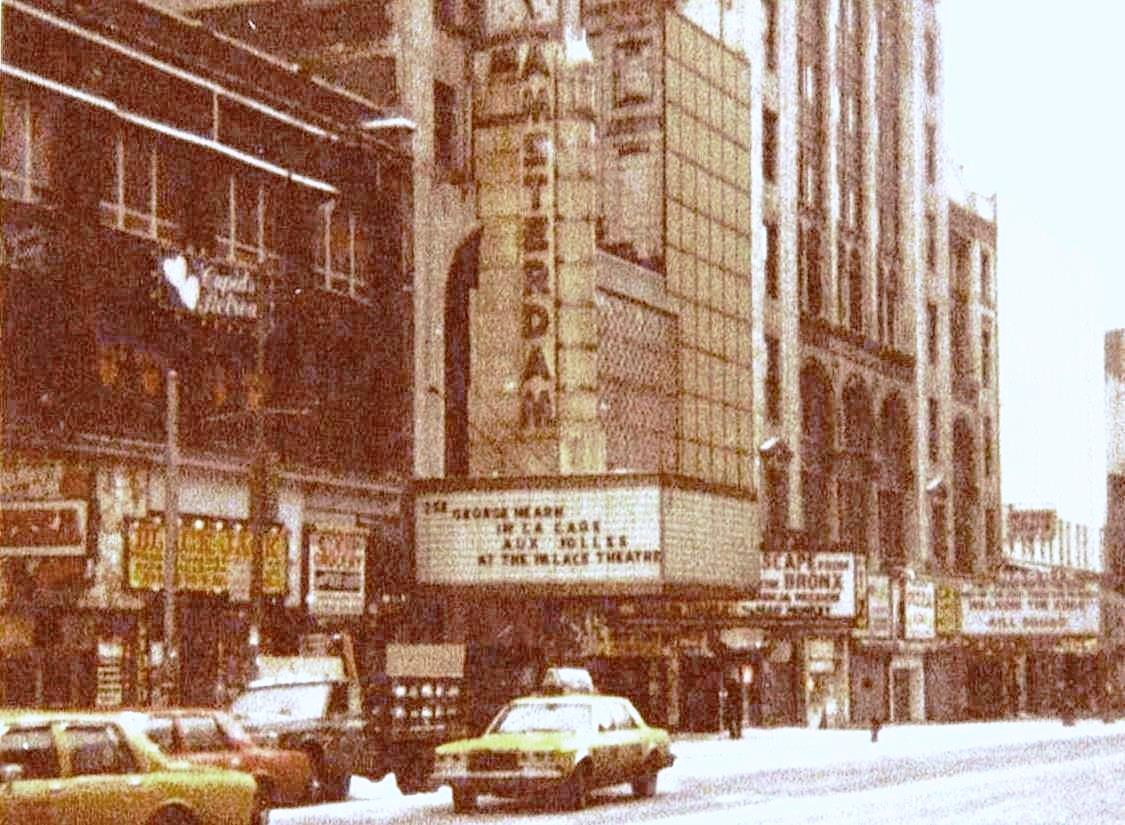
- The "Harris" marquee can be seen on the far right of this 1985 photo, comprising the rightmost part of the Candler Building.
- Interactive map of Sam H. Harris Theatre
- Address: 226 West 42nd Street; Manhattan, New York; United States
- Capacity: 1,200
- Current use: Demolished

Construction
- Opened: 1914
- Closed: 1994
- Demolished: c. 1997–1998
- Architect: Thomas W. Lamb

The Sam H. Harris Theatre, originally the Candler Theatre, was a theater within the Candler Building, at 226 West 42nd Street, in the Theater District of Midtown Manhattan in New York City, New York, US. Opened in 1914, the 1,200-seat theater was designed by Thomas W. Lamb and built for Asa Griggs Candler, who leased it to George M. Cohan, Sam H. Harris, and George Kleine. Although the theater was intended to host both movies and legitimate Broadway productions, it functioned exclusively as a movie theater after 1933. The theater's auditorium was demolished by 1998. The only remnant of the former theater is its 42nd Street facade, which has been used by the Madame Tussauds New York museum since 2000.

The theater was located in the rear of the Candler Building and was accessed through the building's western wings. The auditorium was decorated in the Italian Renaissance style, with seats across two levels. There were originally four boxes, a proscenium arch with ornate plasterwork, and an elaborate saucer dome on the ceiling. Albert Herter painted six murals for the theater's lobby, as well as another mural at the rear of the auditorium.

A syndicate headed by music publisher Sol Bloom acquired the theater's site in 1913. The Candler opened on May 8, 1914, with the film Antony and Cleopatra and started hosting legitimate shows during the 1914–1915 season. Cohan and Harris bought out Bloom's and Kleine's interests in the Candler in 1916 and renamed it the Cohan and Harris Theatre, hosting several successful shows in the 1910s. After Cohan and Harris's partnership dissolved in 1920, Harris continued to produce shows at the theater, renaming it after himself. Harris sold the theater in 1926 to the Shubert brothers, who struggled to produce successful shows and forfeited the theater after seven years. Max A. Cohen, head of the Cinema Circuit, acquired the Harris Theatre in 1933; the venue was used as a movie theater until 1994. The city and state governments of New York acquired the theater as part of the 42nd Street Redevelopment Project in 1990. Forest City Ratner developed an entertainment and retail complex on the site in the 1990s, demolishing the theater to make way for Madame Tussauds.

== History ==
The Candler Theatre was designed by Thomas W. Lamb and built as part of the Candler Building, developed by Coca-Cola Company owner Asa Griggs Candler to designs by the firm of Willauer, Shape & Bready. Candler had acquired the site in December 1911. After initial speculation that a theater would be erected on the site, Candler announced he would erect a 16- to 20-story office building for $1 million. Candler took a long-term lease on the Bruce branch of the New York Public Library, directly to the west, in late 1912. Early the next year, a syndicate headed by music publisher Sol Bloom acquired the library building, as well as a school just behind it, with plans to build a theater at the base of the Candler Building. Theatrical personalities George M. Cohan, Sam H. Harris, and George Kleine leased the theater, which was intended to accommodate not only movies but also Broadway plays.

== Description ==
The Candler Theatre (later Harris Theatre) was located in the rear of the Candler Building at 226 West 42nd Street in the Midtown Manhattan neighborhood of New York City, New York, US. The auditorium was on 41st Street, but it was entered through the Candler Building's five-story western wing on 42nd Street. Although the building's western wing still exists, the theater was demolished in 1997–1998 to make way for the Madame Tussauds New York museum.

The theater's entrance contained a marble vestibule with a gold-stenciled ceiling, which led to a foyer. There was a "tapestry hall" with six murals by Albert Herter, depicting scenes from William Shakespeare's works. Two of the murals were larger than the others and depicted scenes from Othello and The Merchant of Venice, while the other four murals depicted scenes from Shakespearean comedies. The lobby was clad with Caen stone, which was carved with floral decorations in an 18th-century style.

=== Auditorium ===
The auditorium was decorated in the Italian Renaissance style and had two levels: an orchestra and a balcony. The balcony was cantilevered over the orchestra, allowing all rows an unobstructed view of the stage. This was in contrast to earlier theaters with two balconies, which often had columns that blocked views from the orchestra level. The theater had about 1,200 seats in total; the orchestra had 625 seats, while the balcony had 575 seats. There were originally four boxes, two of which were removed in the 1930s when the theater was converted to show movies exclusively.

At the rear of the orchestra level was an oil mural by Herter, which measured 35 by 8 feet (10.7 by 2.4 m) and depicted a fête champêtre. The proscenium arch measured 40 feet (12 m) wide and 21 feet (6.4 m) tall, while the stage measured 33 by 88 feet (10 by 27 m) across. Above the stage was a fly system with counterweights. There was ornate plasterwork around the proscenium arch, as well as an elaborate saucer dome on the ceiling surrounded by twelve metal lighting fixtures. The theater's proscenium arch was unusually wide, and the ceiling was extremely tall, but the decor and lighting were intended to give an impression of intimacy. The theater was painted in what journalists described as "mouse color and orange".

=== Legitimate use ===
==== Cohan and Harris partnership ====
The Candler opened on May 8, 1914, with the film Antony and Cleopatra. Soon after the theater opened, local media reported that the Candler would begin hosting legitimate shows in the 1914–1915 season. Antony and Cleopatra ran for five weeks before the theater screened its next movies, Pierrot the Prodigal and The Naked Truth. The theater's first legitimate show was the play On Trial, the first play written by Elmer Rice, which opened that August and ran for 365 performances. The success of On Trial was an anomaly during the 1914–1915 season, when many other Broadway theaters struggled to stage hits because of the outbreak of World War I. Max Marcin's play House of Glass, which opened in September 1915, was another hit that ran for seven months during the 1915–1916 season. This was followed in early 1916 by the play Justice with John Barrymore, which ran for just over 100 performances.

Cohan and Harris bought out Bloom's and Kleine's interests in the Candler in March 1916 and relocated their offices there. The theater became the Cohan and Harris Theatre, or the "C & H" for short, that August; one journalist said that the change was prompted by the fact that members of the public had frequently mispronounced the "Candler" name. The Great Lover opened in September as the first production in the renamed C & H. During the 1916–1917 season, the partners produced the plays Object-Matrimony, The Intruder, Captain Kidd, Jr., and The Willow Tree. The revue Hitchy-Koo of 1917, which opened in June 1917, ran at the C & H for the first two months of its 220-performance run.

The next three seasons were extremely successful. Harry James Smith's play A Tailor-Made Man opened at the C & H in August 1917 and stayed for one year. This was followed in August 1918 by Anthony Paul Kelly's play Three Faces East, which lasted for several months. Anselm Goetzl's musical opera The Royal Vagabond, featuring Cohan, opened in February 1919. The Royal Vagabond stayed for the rest of the 1919–1920 season, though its 348-performance run was interrupted by the 1919 Actors' Equity strike. Although Harris had signed a contract with the Actors' Equity Association to end the strike, Cohan had refused to sign any such contract, even continuing to stage The Royal Vagabond during the strike. As a direct result of disagreements arising from the Actors' Equity strike, Cohan and Harris had technically stopped producing together after 1919; the men co-produced one more show, the melodrama The Acquittal, before they officially split up. The Acquittal opened at the C & H in January 1920, and Cohan and Harris formally dissolved their partnership that June.

==== 1920s and 1930s ====
Harris continued to produce shows at the theater by himself, starting with the Albert Von Tilzer and Neville Fleeson musical Honey Girl, which opened in May 1920. The theater then screened movies during late 1920. During the run of the play Welcome Stranger, the venue was renamed Sam H. Harris Theatre on February 21, 1921. The renaming followed that of the nearby Lew Fields Theatre, which had been known as the Harris Theatre until 1920. Harris staged a variety of shows at the Sam H. Harris Theatre over the next several years. These included the drama Six-Cylinder Love with Hedda Hopper, which opened in August 1921 and ran for 11 months. Arthur Hopkins's production of Hamlet, starring John Barrymore, received critical acclaim and ran for 101 performances (Note: At the time, it was sometimes cited as the longest run of Hamlet in a Broadway theater. However, this record had already been set in 1912, when Hamlet ran for 102 performances at the Lew Fields.) in late 1922 and early 1923. The Harris then staged two plays by Owen Davis in 1923: Icebound, which opened that February, and The Nervous Wreck, which opened that October.

The producer Thomas Wilkes leased the Harris Theatre in September 1923 for ten years. Under Wilkes's management, the theater hosted the musical One Helluva Night in June 1924, which was so negatively received that it closed on opening night. More successful was the Duncan Sisters revue Topsy and Eva, which opened that December and ran for five months. Wilkes subleased the theater to operator Charles Wagner in August 1925. The theater hosted the comedy The Deacon and the play The Monkey Talks later that year, followed by Love 'Em and Leave 'Em in early 1926. Harris sold the theater to the Shubert brothers in September 1926; he received $1 million in cash and gave part of his ownership stake in the nearby Music Box Theatre to the Shuberts. By then, Harris wanted to focus on producing, and the Theater District had shifted northward, so the Music Box Theatre was more centrally located than the Harris Theatre. The Shubert brothers immediately asked Wilkes and Wagner to leave the theater within six months.

The first show under the Shuberts' ownership was the comedy We Americans, which opened in October 1926 and lasted three months. Many of the Shuberts' shows at the theater were not successful. The theater sometimes presented films in between legitimate bookings, such as in May 1927, when William Fox leased the theater and screened the film 7th Heaven there. Harris again gained control of the theater's bookings that September, leasing the venue from the Shuberts. The theater then hosted the musical Yes, Yes, Yvette starting in November 1927, as well as the melodrama The Trial of Mary Dugan in June 1928 and the play Congai that November. The Harris next hosted the plays Scotland Yard in September 1929 and Mendel, Inc in November. By then, increasing competition between producers had resulted in many flops. Furthermore, with the onset of the Great Depression, many Broadway theaters were impacted by declining attendance.

John Wexley's tragedy The Last Mile opened at the Harris Theatre in February 1930, followed by Zoe Akins's comedy The Greeks Had a Word for It in September 1930. Both plays ran for several months and were the last hits to be staged at the theater. The Harris hosted Lew Leslie's revue Rhapsody in Black in mid-1931, as well as David Boehm and Murdock Pemberton's play Sing High, Sing Low later the same year. The Napoli Film Company leased the Harris Theatre in March 1932 and began screening Italian films there at the end of that month. The Harris Theatre's last-ever legitimate production was Pigeons and People, starring the theater's former co-operator George M. Cohan, which opened in January 1933 and lasted for 70 performances. After the Shuberts filed for bankruptcy that March, the theater went into receivership, and the receiver deeded the theater to the TCA Corporation. Clare Kummer's play Her Master's Voice, which had been scheduled for the Harris Theatre during the 1933–1934 season, was relocated after the receivership proceeding.

=== Movies ===
Abe Minsky had contemplated using the Harris Theatre as a burlesque in mid-1933, but theatrical operator Max A. Cohen instead acquired the Harris Theatre and used it as a movie theater. Cohen headed the Cinema Circuit, which was also operating the Lew Fields (by then known as Anco) and New Amsterdam theaters by the mid-1930s. This was part of a decline in the Broadway theater industry in the mid-20th century; from 1931 to 1950, the number of legitimate theaters decreased from 68 to 30.

Following a renovation that included a new sound system, the theater reopened by November 1933, showing "movie hits at popular prices" and changing the programs three times a week. The Harris screened movies for the rest of its existence. The East River Savings Bank acquired the theater at auction in November 1935, and Asa G. Candler Inc. bought the theater from the bank in 1936 for $200,000. Cohen continued to operate the theater. By the mid-1940s, the ten theaters along 42nd Street between Seventh and Eighth Avenues were all showing movies; this led Variety to call the block the "biggest movie center of the world". The Brandt family, a major operator of movie theaters, operated seven of these theaters, while the Cinema Circuit operated the other three. The Cinema Circuit theaters, the New Amsterdam, Harris, and Anco, were all on the southern side of the street.

In 1947, the Candler family transferred the Candler Building and Harris Theatre to Emory University, which held both structures in its endowment fund. Emory University sold the Candler Building and Harris Theatre to Thomas Moffa in December 1949, including a mortgage of $1.6 million; the structures had an assessed value of $2.3 million. Moffa quickly resold the building to Irving Maidman, who finalized his purchase in March 1950. Maidman sold the theater in 1952 to Kastle Amusement Corporation, a holding company affiliated with Cohen, who then extended his lease by 50 years. By the late 1950s, the Harris was classified as a "move-over house", displaying features immediately after they ran at the New Amsterdam, one of the street's two first-run theaters (the other being the Lyric). As a move-over house, the Harris charged less than the first-run theaters but more than the "reissue houses" that screened old films. The Harris and the other 42nd Street theaters operated from 8 a.m. to 3 a.m., with three shifts of workers. The ten theaters on the block attracted about five million visitors a year between them.

Cohen retired around 1961, and Mark Finkelstein took over full operation of the Cinema Circuit. By the early 1960s, the surrounding block had decayed, but many of the old theater buildings from the block's heyday remained, including the Harris. Many of the area's theaters had been relegated to showing pornography by the 1970s. The area continued to decline, although Finkelstein said none of the company's 42nd Street theaters showed hardcore porn. The Cinema Circuit's movie theaters on 42nd Street continued to operate through the mid-1980s, at which point the Harris was alternating between box-office hits and more obscure exploitation films.

=== Demolition and redevelopment ===
==== Preservation attempts ====
The 42nd Street Development Corporation had been formed in 1976 to discuss plans for redeveloping Times Square. The same year, the City University of New York's Graduate Center hosted an exhibition with photographs of the Harris and other theaters to advocate for the area's restoration. One plan for the site, in 1978, called for restoring the Selwyn, Apollo, and Harris for opera and dance, rather than for theatrical purposes. Other nearby buildings would have been razed to create a park. Another plan, called the City at 42nd Street, was announced in December 1979 as part of a proposal to restore West 42nd Street around Times Square. Under the plan, five theaters would have been restored and reopened, including the Harris, which would have become a movie theater. Mayor Ed Koch wavered in his support of the plan, criticizing it as a "Disneyland on 42nd Street". Subsequently, Hugh Hardy conducted a report on 42nd Street's theaters in 1980. His report, in conjunction with a movement opposing the demolition of the nearby Helen Hayes and Morosco theaters, motivated the New York City Landmarks Preservation Commission (LPC) to survey fifty of Midtown Manhattan's extant theaters in the early 1980s.

The LPC started to consider protecting theaters, including the Harris Theatre, as landmarks in 1982, with discussions continuing over the next several years. While the LPC granted landmark status to many Broadway theaters starting in 1987, it deferred decisions on the interior of the Harris Theatre. Further discussion of the landmark designations was delayed for several decades. In late 2015, the LPC hosted public hearings on whether to designate seven theaters on the block as landmarks; the Harris was not considered for designation because it had already been demolished. The LPC rejected the designations in February 2016 because the theaters were already subject to historic-preservation regulations set by the state government.

==== Initial plans ====
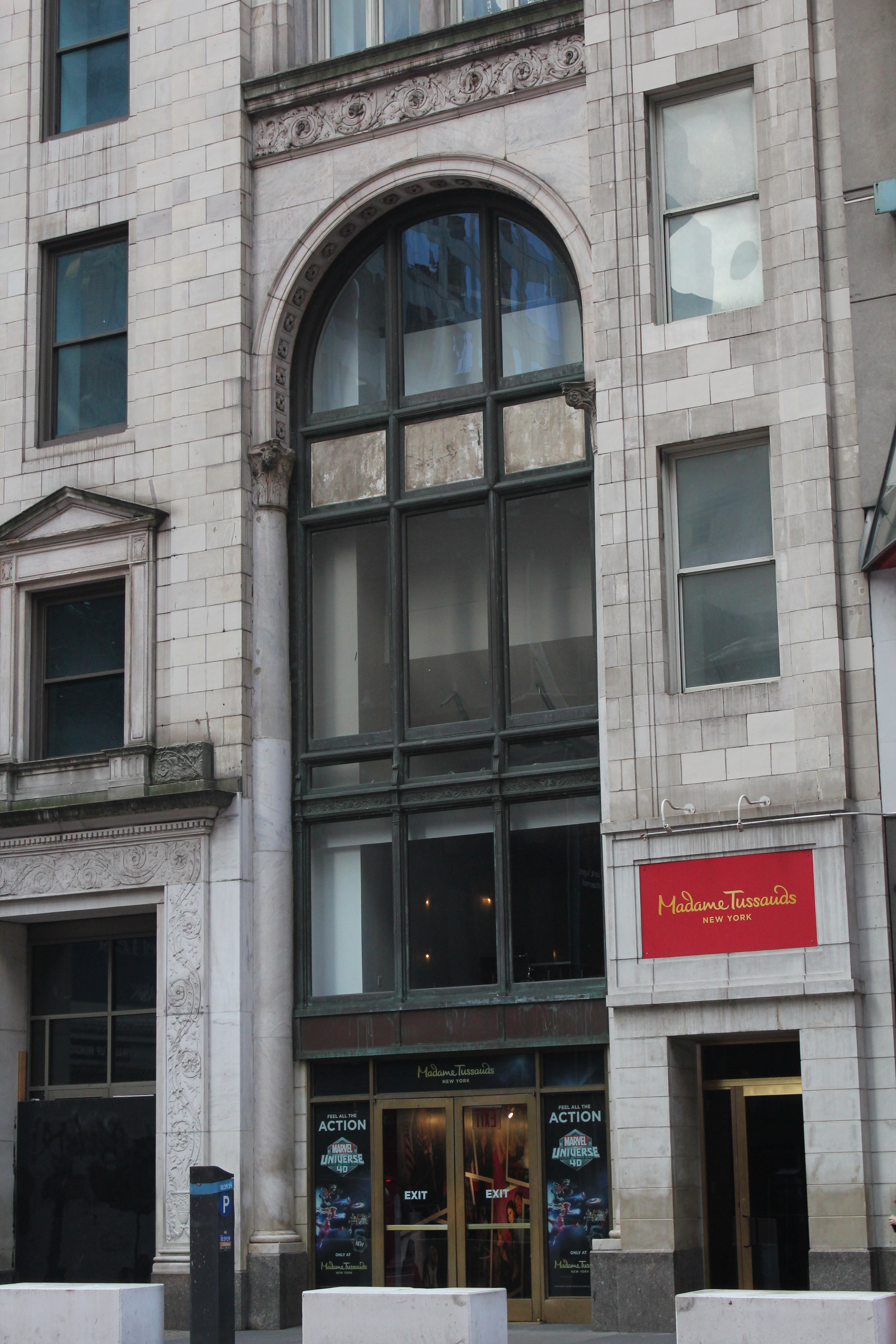
Former Harris Theatre entrance

The Urban Development Corporation (UDC), an agency of the New York state government, proposed redeveloping the area around a portion of West 42nd Street in 1981. The plan centered around four towers that were to be built at 42nd Street's intersections with Broadway and Seventh Avenue, developed by Park Tower Realty and the Prudential Insurance Company of America. (Note: The sites were: Northwest corner of 42nd Street and Seventh Avenue: now 3 Times Square; Northeast corner of 42nd Street and Broadway: now 4 Times Square; Southwest corner of 42nd Street and Seventh Avenue: now 5 Times Square; South side of 42nd Street between Seventh Avenue and Broadway: now 7 Times Square (Times Square Tower)) The city government selected the Nederlander Organization in April 1982 to operate the New Amsterdam and Harris theaters as legitimate theaters. The Cine Theater Corporation acquired the Harris Theatre from the Cinema Circuit in April 1984 and immediately announced plans to renovate it for $250,000. The UDC also selected Jujamcyn Theaters to redevelop three other theaters on the block. As a result, the Brandts and Cine Theater Corp. sued the UDC, claiming that the moves shut out independent theatrical operators, but a state court dismissed the lawsuit. Ultimately, the 42nd Street Redevelopment Project was delayed for several years due to lawsuits and disputes concerning the towers. The Nederlander Organization was still planning to restore the New Amsterdam and Harris theaters in the late 1980s.

In 1989, the Durst Organization acquired the leases to eight theaters in Times Square, including the Harris. It subsequently announced plans to renovate the eight theaters in February 1990. The New York state government acquired the theater sites that April via eminent domain. The city had planned to buy out the theaters' leases but withdrew after the 42nd Street Company indicated it would lease the theaters to another developer. Although Durst protested the move, a New York Supreme Court judge ruled that the sites could be acquired by condemnation. Government officials hoped that development of the theaters would finally allow the construction of the four towers around 42nd Street, Broadway, and Seventh Avenue.

Norman Adie of 42nd Street Theaters, who had owned the theater until it was condemned, initially agreed to vacate the site but later reneged, resulting in a years-long dispute between him and the city and state governments. The theater continued to screen movies, even as most other tenants of nearby buildings had moved elsewhere. 42nd Street Development Project Inc. had taken over the New Amsterdam, Harris, and Empire theaters by 1992. The theater was still operating as late as 1993, when it screened first runs of movies, charging $6 a ticket. The Harris Theatre closed permanently the next year. Adie fought the city and state governments' acquisition of his theater, saying: "I'm one of the last legitimate businesses there, but they only want big names."

==== Forest City Ratner plans and demolition ====
After Disney committed to restoring the New Amsterdam Theatre in 1994, most of the other theaters around 42nd Street were quickly leased. The Times Square Business Improvement District set up a visitor center within the theater's foyer in the mid-1990s. By 1995, real-estate development firm Forest City Ratner was planning a $150 million entertainment and retail complex on the site of the Empire, Harris, and Liberty theaters. Madame Tussauds and AMC Theatres leased space in the complex that July. Madame Tussauds would occupy the eastern section of the site, using the former Harris Theatre's facade as an entrance to its wax museum; Bruce Ratner wanted to develop a similarly ornate gateway for AMC on the western end of the site. The Times Square Business Improvement District's visitor center subsequently moved to the Selwyn Theatre, then to the Embassy Theatre.

Work on the Forest City Ratner development began in August 1997. Because there was so little left of the original Harris Theatre, the developers decided to raze the theater to make way for the Madame Tussauds museum. Even as the theater was being demolished in 1998, theatrical personalities wanted to restore the theater to legitimate use, and New 42nd Street was seeking tenants for the space. Ultimately, the auditorium was destroyed by the late 1990s, though sources disagree on whether the theater was completely razed by 1997 or 1998. The neighboring Murray's Roman Gardens was also razed to make way for the museum. The Harris's facade was retained as an exit to the museum, which opened in November 2000.

== Notable productions ==
Notable productions at the theater
Opening year	Name	Refs.
1914	On Trial	
1916	Justice	
1916	The Great Lover	
1916	Captain Kidd, Jr.	
1917	The Willow Tree	
1917	Hitchy-Koo of 1917	
1917	A Tailor-Made Man	
1918	Three Faces East	
1920	The Acquittal	
1921	Six Cylinder Love	
1922	Hamlet	
1923	Icebound	
1923	The Nervous Wreck	
1924	Topsy and Eva	
1925	The Monkey Talks	
1926	Love 'Em and Leave 'Em	
1926	We Americans	
1927	Yes, Yes, Yvette	
1928	The Trial of Mary Dugan	
1929	Scotland Yard	
1930	The Last Mile	
1932	I Loved You Wednesday	

== See also ==
- List of Broadway theaters
