= Candler Building (New York City) =

Mixed-use skyscraper in Manhattan

- U.S. National Register of Historic Places
- New York State Register of Historic Places
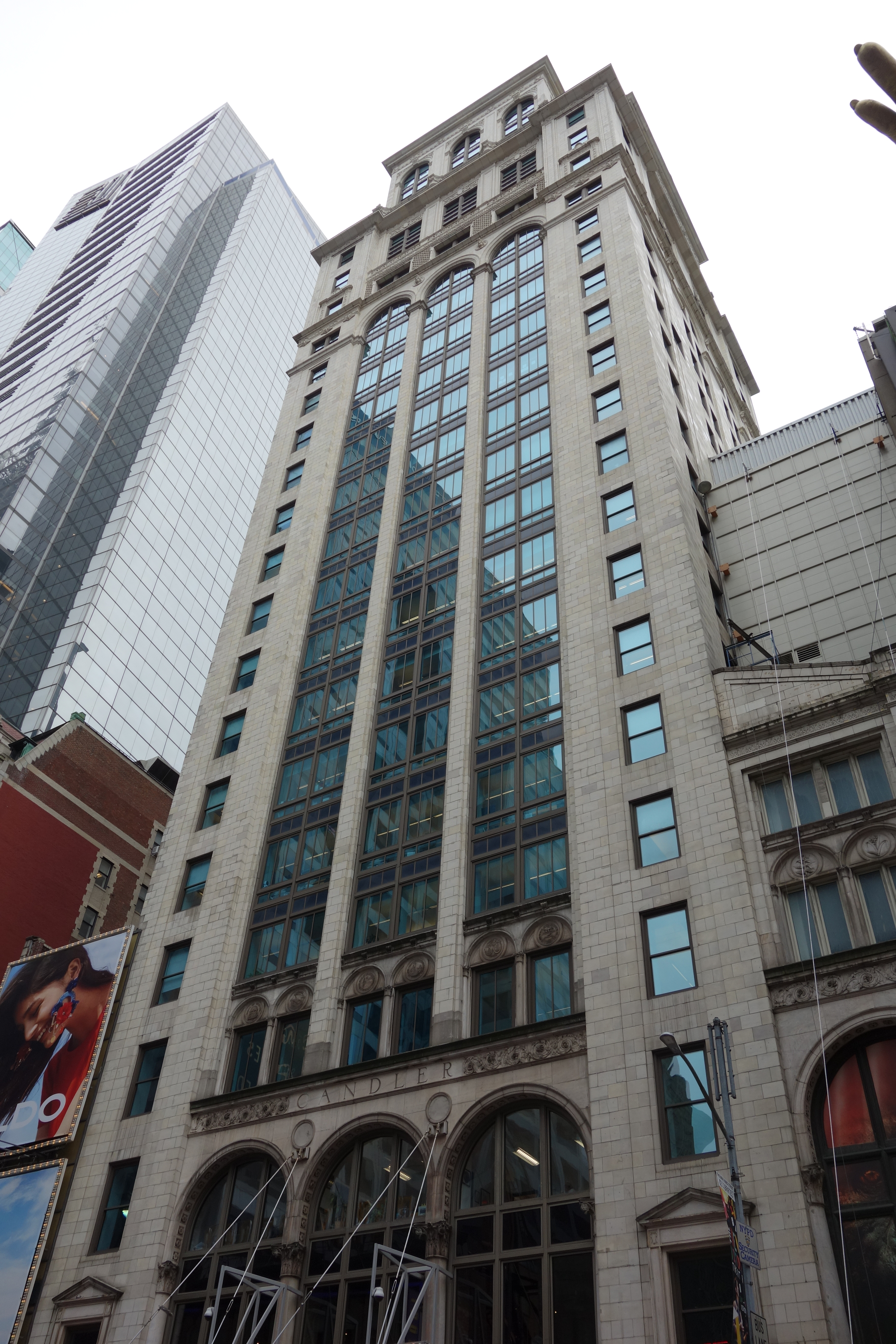
- Location: 220 West 42nd Street, Manhattan, New York
- Coordinates: 40°45′22″N 73°59′18″W
- Area: 0.1 acres (0.040 ha)
- Built: 1913
- Architect: Willauer, Shape and Bready
- Architectural style: Skyscraper
- NRHP reference No.: 82003368
- NYSRHP No.: 06101.000634

Significant dates
- Added to NRHP: July 8, 1982
- Designated NYSRHP: June 1, 1982

The Candler Building is a skyscraper at the southern end of Times Square in Midtown Manhattan, New York City, New York, U.S. Located at 220 West 42nd Street, the 24-story building was designed by the firm of Willauer, Shape and Bready in the Spanish Renaissance style. It was constructed between 1912 and 1913 for Coca-Cola Company owner Asa Griggs Candler. The Candler Building was one of the last skyscrapers built in New York City before the 1916 Zoning Resolution, which required setbacks. It is listed on the National Register of Historic Places (NRHP).

The building consists of two sections: a 24-story rectangular tower to the north, facing 42nd Street, and a shorter 17-story rear wing to the south, facing 41st Street. The tower section was originally flanked by five-story wings and was designed with a marble and terracotta facade; the terracotta has since been replaced with cast stone. The rear wing contains a brick facade. On 42nd Street, the facade is divided vertically into five bays; a loggia spans the three central bays. The building contains an emergency-exit staircase to the south, which is structurally separate from the rest of the building. The rear wing originally contained the Candler Theatre (later Sam H. Harris Theatre). The remainder of the building contained showrooms and offices.

The site of the Candler Building was cleared beginning in February 1912 and the building opened the next year. For several decades, the Candler Building largely housed entertainment firms. The Candler family owned the building until 1947, when it began to go through a series of sales. Charles F. Noyes acquired the building in 1965 and renovated it, then marketed the rear wing to garment firms. The building's upper floors were sealed in the 1970s due to a lack of tenants. Former New York City government official Michael J. Lazar acquired the Candler Building at a foreclosure proceeding in 1980 and leased the space to city agencies, prompting a corruption investigation. The building was renovated again in the late 1990s following a second foreclosure, and its space was leased to SFX Entertainment and McDonald's until 2020. During the 2020s, the building's commercial space was briefly used as a shelter for asylum seekers before becoming a store; the structure's owner proposed converting the upper stories into a hotel, then apartments.

== Site ==
The Candler Building is on 220 West 42nd Street, between Seventh Avenue and Eighth Avenue, near the southern end of Times Square in Midtown Manhattan, New York City, New York, U.S. The land lot is irregularly shaped and covers 10,109 square feet (939.2 m^{2}), extending 200 feet (61 m) between its two frontages on 41st and 42nd Streets. The main frontage on 42nd Street measures 78 feet (24 m) wide, while the 41st Street frontage measures 25 feet (7.6 m) wide. In the mid-20th century, the lot was rectangular and measured 125 feet (38 m) on both streets, with a total area of 25,000 square feet (2,300 m^{2}). The larger area accommodated the Sam H. Harris Theatre on 41st Street, as well as a pair of five-story wings on 42nd Street.

The city block includes 5 Times Square and the New Amsterdam Theatre to the east, as well as Madame Tussauds New York, Empire Theatre, and Eleven Times Square to the west. The Todd Haimes Theatre, Times Square Theatre, Lyric Theatre, New Victory Theater, and 3 Times Square are across 42nd Street to the north. Entrances to the New York City Subway's Times Square–42nd Street and 42nd Street–Port Authority Bus Terminal stations, served by the 1, 2, 3, 7, <7>, A, C, E, N, Q, R, W, and S trains, are on the same block to the west and east. The surrounding area is part of Manhattan's Theater District and contains many Broadway theaters. Prior to the Candler Building's construction, the site had contained the Central Baptist Church. The site immediately to the west, at 230 West 42nd Street, was occupied by the former Percival Apartments (later Murray's Roman Gardens) until approximately 1996, when it was replaced by the Madame Tussauds museum.

== Architecture ==
The Candler Building was developed for Coca-Cola Company owner Asa Griggs Candler. It was designed by the firm of Willauer, Shape and Bready, which was composed of Arthur E. Willauer, George Lee Bready, and Robert Shape. The building is designed in the Spanish Renaissance style. According to architectural historian Christopher Gray, the Candler Building may have been the first high-rise building in New York City with a fireproof emergency staircase. The Candler Building was one of the last high-rises in New York City to be built before the passage of the 1916 Zoning Resolution, which influenced the development of "stepped-tower" skyscrapers with setbacks.

=== Form ===
The building consists of two sections: a 24-story rectangular tower to the north, facing 42nd Street, and a shorter 17-story wing to the south, facing 41st Street. The tower on 42nd Street was designed as a standalone structure measuring 78 by 89 feet (24 by 27 m). It was originally flanked by five-story wings, which architectural writer Eric Nash likened to a "finned 1950s rocket ship". According to Emporis, the highest habitable floor is the 23rd story of the tower, which is 290 feet (88 m) above the street.

The tower had a copper cross-hip roof, which formerly also contained skylights. Varying measurements are given for the building's height. According to Christopher Gray, the building measured 352 feet (107 m) tall to the top of the hip roof, above which rose a 36-foot-tall (11 m) flagpole. Emporis cites the bottom of the hip roof as being 328 feet (100 m) high, increasing to 341 feet (104 m) at its peak. According to Emporis, the building measured 387 feet (118 m) high if the flagpole was included. A 1928 New York Times article also cited the Candler Building as being 341 feet (104 m) tall. Another publication cited the hip roof as ranging from 342 to 356 feet (104 to 109 m) high.

The American Architect wrote in 1913 that the cross-hipped roof of the Candler Building's tower seemed to befit "the entire building though it covers a smaller area than the stories below." The Craftsman magazine wrote that the Candler Building "is of note among skyscrapers not only for its simplicity of design, its upright lines and beautiful top placed as if crowning a monument, but because of its placid appearance as it stretches skyward above a locality of seething, intense life."

=== Facade ===
==== Main tower ====
The tower originally had a marble and terracotta facade on all four of its elevations; the terracotta was replaced in the 1990s with cast stone. The 42nd Street (northern) elevation of the tower section's facade is divided vertically into five bays (excluding the wings). The base spans the first through third stories, with storefronts on the first story. These storefronts are the only parts of the building that have been significantly altered. The center three bays initially contained a pair of engaged marble columns, measuring 2 feet (0.61 m) wide and 30 feet (9.1 m) tall. On the second and third stories, the outermost bays are flanked by pilasters, which rise to the 16th story. The center three bays form a double-height arcade. There are roundels in the spandrels diagonally above each arch. Additionally, a plain cornice runs above the entire arcade; at the center is a panel with the name "Candler".

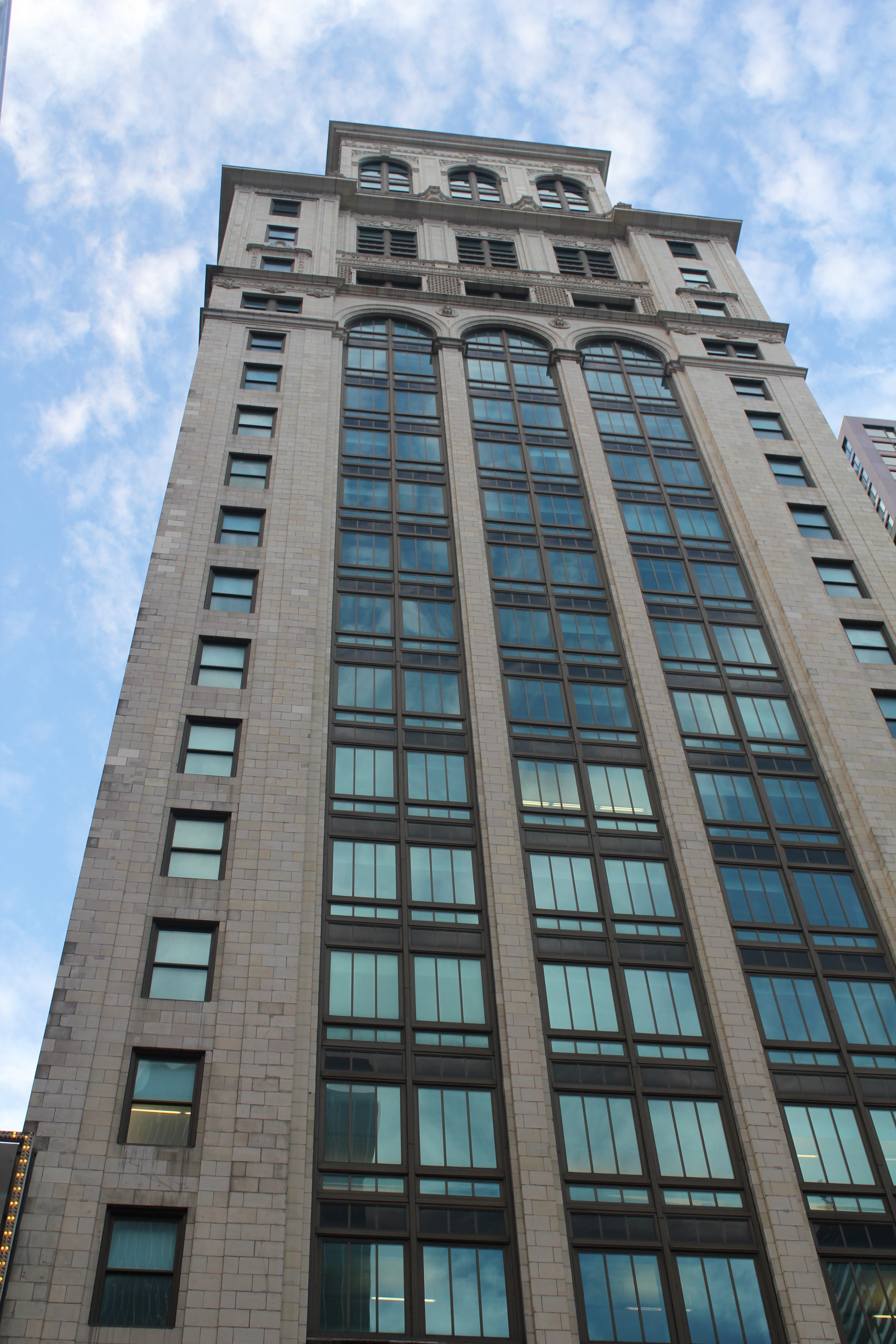
View of midsection from the street

The 4th through 17th stories comprise the building's midsection. On all of the tower's elevations, the outermost bays contain one rectangular window on each story. On the northern elevation, the center three bays are separated vertically by piers that rise from the 4th to the 16th stories. Each of the central bays contains two windows per story. The spandrel panels above the fourth-story windows contain lunettes with roundels inside. On the remaining stories, the spandrel panels above each window are made of metal. Each story contains full-height windows with glass-and-plaster sills. The windows are nearly flush with the rest of the facade, maximizing natural light exposure. At the 17th story, each of the central bays on 42nd Street contains a round-arched window, while the outer bays are wider than on the lower stories. The 17th story is topped by a cornice with putti and friezes, which wraps around all four elevations.

The western and eastern elevations contain a higher proportion of masonry to windows. On the 4th through 17th stories of either elevation are two central bays, each with two windows per floor. The southern elevation is more plainly designed and contains an emergency-exit tower near its west end. The emergency stair is within a shaft enclosed by brick walls on all sides. The shaft is structurally separate from the rest of the building, connected only to the balconies outside each floor.

The uppermost portion of the building is split into the 18th to 20th stories, the 21st to 23rd stories, and the roof. On the 18th to 20th stories, the northern elevation is divided into five bays, similar to those on the lower stories. In the center bays, the 18th-story windows are surrounded by ornamental frames, while the 19th- and 20th-story windows are recessed. A cornice runs above the 20th story on all four elevations. Above that cornice, the tower contains setbacks at each of its four corners, surrounded by ornate balustrades. There are triple-height round-arched bays at the center of the facade on all sides. The hip roof, above the 23rd story, is surrounded by a balustrade containing pointed finials and paired dragons. The roof was originally composed of green clay tiles, which were replaced with metal replicas in the late 1990s.

==== Rear wing ====
The rear wing on 41st Street has a simple brick design and is three bays wide. Along the 41st Street elevation of the rear wing, The first story contains a modern-style entrance, while the second- and third-story windows were surrounded by a limestone frame. Originally, this wing contained loading docks. There are also limestone cornices, which project from the facade above the 3rd, 14th, and 15th stories. Each story contains several double hung windows; those at the top story are topped by keystones. The western and eastern elevations of this wing are made of plain brick with numerous horizontal string courses made of terracotta.

=== Features ===
Ceiling heights were generally high; the first floor alone was 18 feet (5.5 m) tall. The remaining stories had ceiling heights ranging from 12 to 15 feet (3.7 to 4.6 m), though the majority of the office stories had ceiling heights of 12.5 feet (3.8 m). (Note: The ceiling heights are as follows: 2nd and 4th floors: 13 ft (4.0 m); 3rd floor: 13.5 ft (4.1 m); 5th–16th floors: 12.5 ft (3.8 m); 17th floor: 15 ft (4.6 m); 18th floor: 14 ft (4.3 m); 19th–22nd floors: 12.5 ft (3.8 m); 23rd floor: 12 ft (3.7 m); 24th floor: 15 ft (4.6 m))

==== Ground level ====
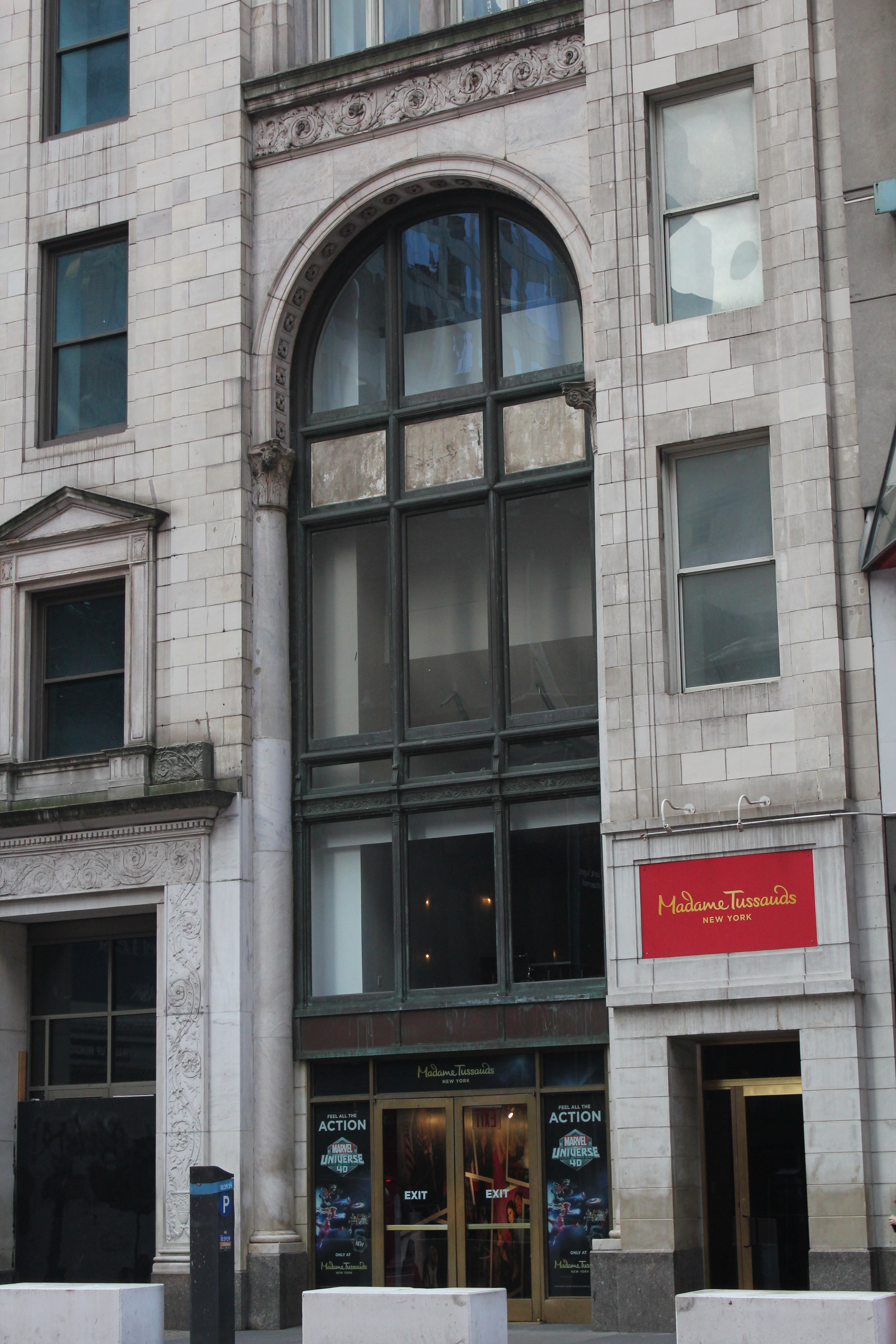
Former Candler Theatre entrance, now an exit from Madame Tussauds New York

The rear wing originally contained the Candler Theatre (later Harris Theatre), which was demolished in 1997. The auditorium was on 41st Street, but it was entered through the Candler Building's western five-story wing on 42nd Street. The entrance contained a marble vestibule with a gold-stenciled ceiling, which led to a foyer. There was a "tapestry hall" with six murals by Albert Herter, depicting scenes from Shakespeare's comedies. The auditorium was decorated in the Italian Renaissance style and had two levels: an orchestra and a balcony. The orchestra level had 625 seats while the balcony had 500 seats, including four boxes. At the rear of the orchestra level was an oil mural by Herter, which measured 35 by 8 feet (10.7 by 2.4 m) and depicted a fête champêtre. There was ornate plasterwork around the proscenium arch, as well as an elaborate saucer dome on the ceiling surrounded by twelve metal lighting fixtures.

From 2002 to 2020, the first three stories of the Candler Building operated as a McDonald's fast food restaurant. The restaurant contained 300 seats and covered about 17,000 square feet (1,600 m^{2}). There was a marquee in front of the McDonald's, with 7,500 light bulbs. The restaurant's design was intended to evoke the backstage area of a Broadway theater. The front of the McDonald's had a bare-brick wall and blue glass-tile columns. A section of the second story was removed to create a 40-foot-tall (12 m) staircase hall. When the McDonald's restaurant was in operation, promotional launches and special events were frequently hosted there. By 2025, this space housed the Tm:rw retail space, spanning 20,000 square feet (1,900 m^{2}) across three stories.

==== Upper stories ====
The remaining stories are served by four passenger and three freight elevators. Four of the elevators are accessed from the 42nd Street wing, while the remaining three elevators are accessed from 41st Street. At each corner of the main tower is an interior staircase and a bank of elevators, thereby providing four means of egress. The lowest two-thirds of the building was intended as both industrial loft space and offices. The lowest floors contained loft spaces measuring 10,000 square feet (930 m^{2}) per story, while the middle floors contained showrooms and offices. Consequently, each of these stories was designed with a largely open plan, except for several structural columns. The top eight floors were intended for offices and suites.

On each of the 2nd through 17th stories, the tower and rear wing were separated only by a masonry partition with a metal door. This allowed tenants to easily contain any fires. The entire building also contained a fire sprinkler system. These fireproofing measures were included in the aftermath of the Triangle Shirtwaist Factory fire, which had occurred in 1911, the year before the Candler Building's construction commenced.

== History ==
The Candler Building was one of several structures developed by Asa Griggs Candler in the early 20th century. Prior to constructing the structure at 220 West 42nd Street, Candler had developed the Candler Building in Atlanta, as well as other structures in Baltimore and Kansas City. Furthermore, in the first two decades of the 20th century, eleven legitimate theaters were built within one block of West 42nd Street between Seventh and Eighth Avenues.

=== Development ===
In December 1911, Candler acquired the old Baptist Church building on 220–226 West 42nd Street from Harry Frazee and P. Chauncey Anderson for $425,000. In addition, Candler bought a 25-foot-wide (7.6 m) lot on 41st Street. After initial speculation that a theater would be erected on the site, Candler announced he would erect a 16- to 20-story office building for $1 million. The proposed structure would be the tallest building on that section of 42nd Street. The A. A. Volk Demolishing and Excavating Company began clearing the site at the beginning of February 1912. The same month, the Cauldwell-Wingate Company received the general contract for the building's construction. The firm of Willauer, Shape and Bready filed plans for the building that March. The New York Times said in March 1912 that, as a result of the construction of the Candler Building and other structures on 42nd Street, the thoroughfare "will present a totally different appearance in respect to business development than has characterized it in the past".

Candler named the building after himself, and he planned to lease out the offices to companies from the Southern United States. To protect views from the new tower, Candler acquired a three-story house at 218 West 42nd Street, east of his existing site, in June 1912. This gave Candler a frontage of 100 feet (30 m) on 42nd Street. He planned to erect a five-story building on that lot, complementing the architecture of the Candler Building, and lease that structure to one tenant. Later that year, Candler also took a long-term lease on the Bruce branch of the New York Public Library, directly to the west. In early 1913, a syndicate headed by Sol Bloom acquired the library building, as well as a school just behind it, with plans to build a theater at the base of the Candler Building.

=== 1910s to 1930s ===
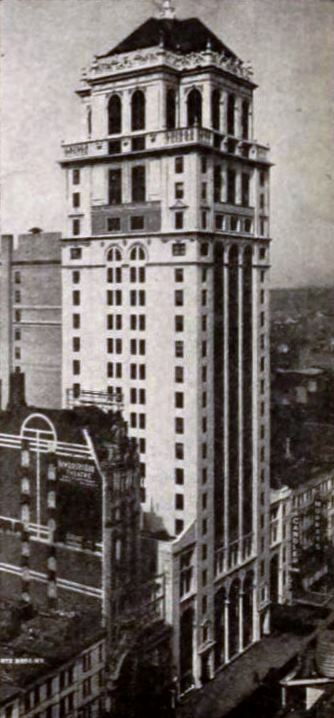
The Candler Building as seen in the November 1920 issue of Exhibitors Herald

The Candler Building's architects, builders, and real-estate agents hosted a party in February 1913 to celebrate its completion. At the time, the structure was the tallest in Manhattan north of the Metropolitan Life Insurance Company Tower on 24th Street, which until 1913 had been the tallest building in the world. Asa Candler refused to lease any of the building's space to manufacturers. Other office buildings around Times Square had similar restrictions to prevent them from "falling into the factory list of structures", which were commonplace along the southernmost sections of Fifth Avenue and Madison Avenue. The Real Estate Record and Guide wrote: "The leases will carefully define just what is meant by the term 'manufacturing'." Rents initially averaged 75 cents per square foot (equivalent to $24 per square foot ($260/m^{2}) in 2025). By early 1914, the Times said the structure was "well rented". Among the Candler Building's tenants during the 1910s were producer Sol Lesser, theatrical manager Henry W. Savage, and the partnership of theatrical operators George M. Cohan and Sam H. Harris. Additionally, in 1915, publishing company Alfred A. Knopf had its first office at the Candler Building.

Meanwhile, Bloom's syndicate had completed plans for the adjacent theater in August 1913, and the Candler Theatre opened in May 1914 as a movie theater. The theater switched to hosting legitimate shows within several months, and it became the Cohan and Harris Theatre in 1916. Brooks & Momand placed a $600,000 first mortgage loan on the Candler Building in July 1920. This was superseded in May 1925 by a $1.4 million first mortgage loan given by Oscar D. and Herbert V. Dike. The building's tenants in the 1920s included the New York State Motion Picture Commission and the Radio Artists' Association of America. Despite increasing real-estate values, the Candler Building remained the only skyscraper on the block at the end of the decade.

At the onset of the Great Depression, many Broadway theaters were impacted by declining attendance. As a result, several theaters on the block were converted into burlesque houses, prompting complaints from many of the Candler Building's tenants, who had generally negative perceptions of the burlesque theaters. According to the building's manager, Oscar D. Dike, three large tenants moved out during 1932 because the burlesque theaters were driving customers away. The Candler Building's real-estate agent, Abel Enklewitz, claimed in 1934 that the building had lost half of its tenants in the past several years because of the declining conditions of the block. According to Enklewitz, the building's valuation had declined by $1 million just in the preceding year. The Candler family acquired the Harris Theatre in 1936. The building was occupied by Coca-Cola's New York City offices, as well as doctors and lawyers, in the 1930s. Other tenants included a shoe store, a bungalow developer, and a research laboratory.

=== 1940s to 1970s ===
The building continued to host a variety of tenants in the 1940s, such as a clubhouse and a dental laboratory, as well as a magic trick shop operated by magician Max Holden. In 1947, the Candler family transferred the Candler Building and Harris Theatre to Emory University, which held both structures in its endowment fund. Emory University sold the Candler Building and Harris Theatre to Thomas Moffa in December 1949, including a mortgage of $1.6 million; the structures had an assessed value of $2.3 million. Moffa quickly resold the building to Irving Maidman, who finalized his purchase in March 1950. The following year, Maidman resold the Candler Building (but not the Harris Theatre) to a syndicate represented by Milton Kestenberg. At the time, the building's value was assessed at $1.775 million. The Candler Building's tenants in the mid-20th century were largely entertainment firms.

The surrounding block had decayed by the early 1960s, but many of the old theater buildings from the block's heyday remained, as did the Candler Building. Kestenberg sold the building in 1966 to a group led by Charles F. Noyes; the sale was subject to a first mortgage of $1.35 million. Noyes's syndicate planned to spend $600,000 to clean the facade, renovate the lobby, and add new elevators as part of a six-month project. Newmark & Company was hired as the building's leasing agent. Newmark began advertising the rear wing at 221 West 41st Street to garment firms in 1968, attracting firms such as the Ellen Tracy Blouse Corporation. By the late 1960s, the main tower at 220 West 42nd Street primarily housed entertainment tenants such as Allied Artists International and the Jewish Broadcasting Service. The building's tenants also included detective firms, dental-equipment manufacturers, and publishers' representatives.

By the late 1970s, there were so few office tenants that the building's upper floors were sealed. The basement was inundated with 6 feet (1.8 m) of water. The office stories stood completely empty for three years, and the building's owner ultimately forfeited the building to the Empire Savings Bank in a foreclosure proceeding. The 42nd Street Development Corporation had been formed in 1976 to discuss plans for redeveloping Times Square. One plan, in 1978, called for restoring several theaters for legitimate productions and for opera and dance. Other nearby buildings would have been razed to create a park. The City at 42nd Street was announced in late 1979 as part of a proposal to restore West 42nd Street around Times Square. The Candler Building would have been preserved under this plan. Mayor Ed Koch wavered in his support of the plan, referring to it as a "Disneyland on 42nd Street".

=== Times Square redevelopment ===
==== 1980s ====
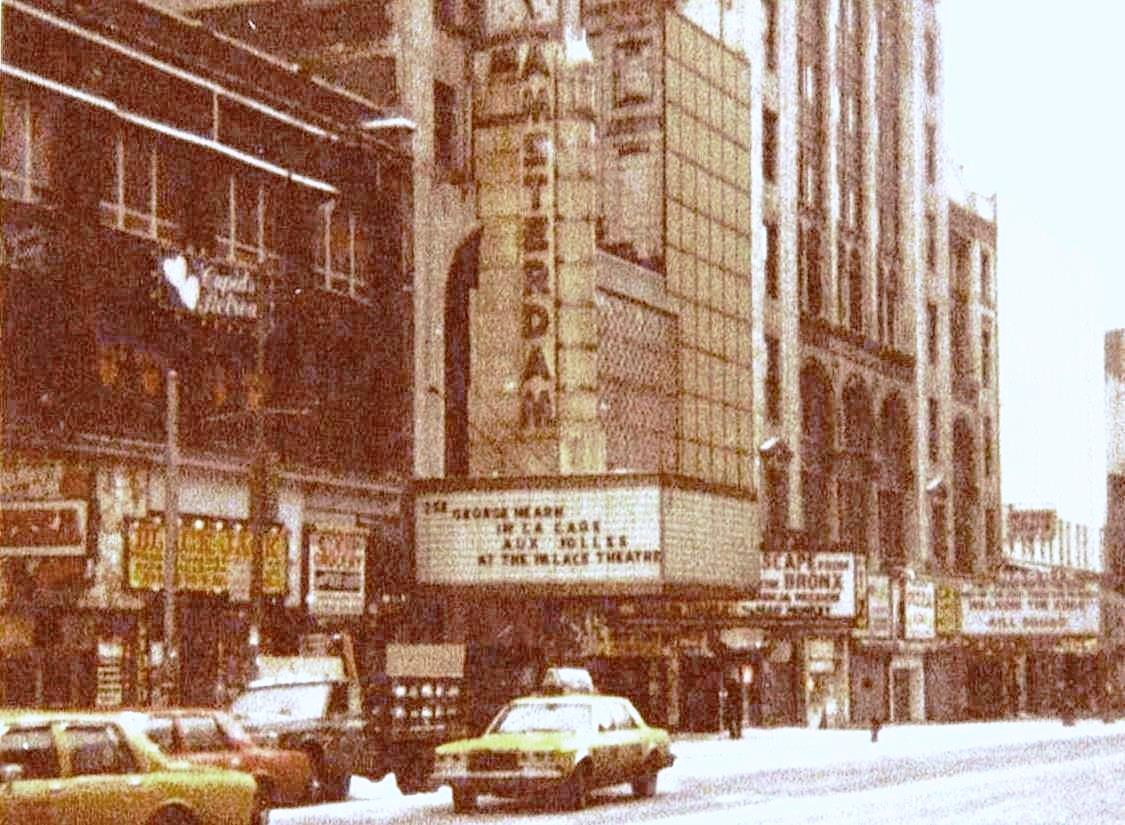
View of the surrounding block in 1985, with the New Amsterdam Theatre at foreground and the Candler Building at right

The eastern five-story wing on 42nd Street was sold in early 1980 to businessman Leonard Cohen, who renovated the facade. The western wing was intact but remained in use as an entrance to the Harris Theatre. That February, New York City Taxi and Limousine Commission (TLC) commissioner Michael J. Lazar and a limited partnership led by real-estate investor David I. Burley paid $1.3 million for the Candler Building. The new owners then spent $4 million on renovations. Walter & Samuels started leasing out the office space in late 1980. An adult training center for electronics company RCA occupied 30,000 square feet (2,800 m^{2}), and additional space was leased to the TLC and other city agencies. Though a 1981 report of Times Square found that the Candler Building was "ineligible for landmark regulation", the Candler Building was listed on the National Register of Historic Places (NRHP) in 1982.

The Urban Development Corporation (UDC), an agency of the New York state government, had proposed redeveloping the area around a portion of West 42nd Street in 1981. The Candler Building was excluded from the project. The Brandt family, which operated several neighboring theaters that were to be demolished as part of the project, objected that the city government was giving the Candler Building special treatment by protecting it from redevelopment. About three-quarters of the building was occupied by 1984; the lowest 16 floors were mostly occupied by various city agencies. The following January, Lazar sold the building to the Winter Organization for $14.75 million. Several property owners in Times Square cited the sale as an example of the neighborhood's increasing property values. Government officials expressed concerns that the sale would lead to lawsuits from owners whose properties were being condemned through eminent domain, since these owners would be motivated to seek higher prices for their buildings.

In 1986, a federal grand jury issued a subpoena for documents relating to the TLC's lease in the Candler Building, as well as the building's exclusion from the 42nd Street Redevelopment. The director of the city's Parking Violations Bureau, Lester N. Shafran, had been a limited partner in the building and thus profited from the TLC's lease. Federal officials charged Shafran and Lazar with bribery. Both men were acquitted on charges relating to the Candler Building, even though they were found guilty of other corruption charges. Meanwhile, seven performing-arts organizations leased space in the Candler Building between 1985 and 1987, including the Big Apple Circus, the New York Theatre Workshop, and the Women's Project.

==== 1990s to present ====
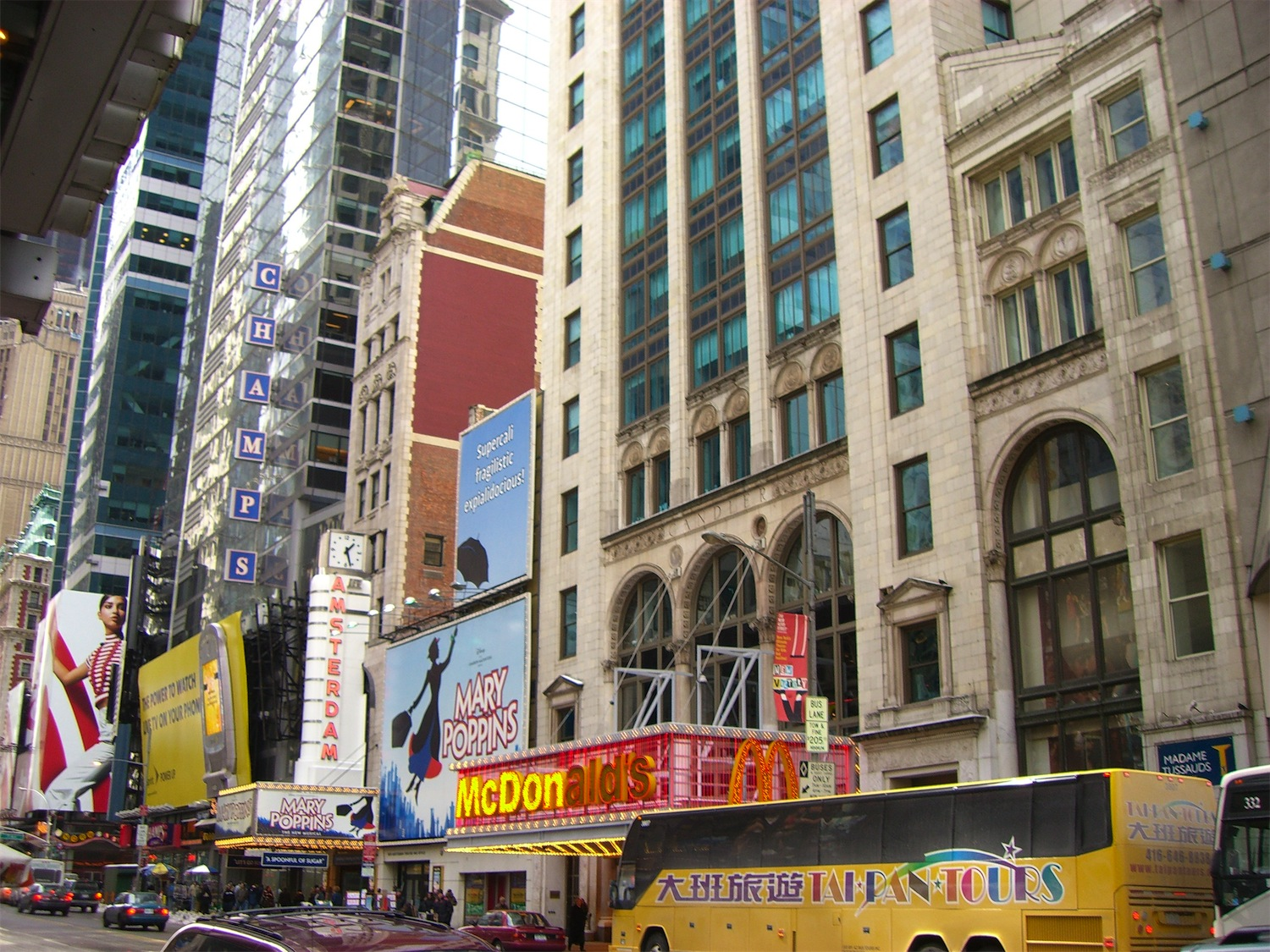
The Candler Building in 2007, while the McDonald's restaurant was in operation

Another plan for redeveloping the surrounding area was proposed in the early 1990s. Herbert Muschamp wrote in 1993 that the Candler Building's 1950s-era "ditsy paneling" would remain in place "as an integral part of the urban collage". Approximately three-quarters of the terracotta mortar and about half of the brick mortar had degraded by then. Massachusetts Mutual Life Insurance Company took over the building following a foreclosure proceeding the same year. By 1996, the building was 65 percent leased. At that point, Massachusetts Mutual announced plans to renovate the building for $25 million. Swanke Hayden Connell Architects was hired to design the renovation. Construction manager Lehrer McGovern Bovis replaced the roof and replaced the terracotta decorations with cast stone. The cast stone was fabricated on-site and glazed to match the appearance of the original. Other decorative details were rebuilt in glass fiber reinforced concrete, and the windows were replaced with replicas of the originals. In addition, the interior was gutted and rehabilitated. Since the building was on the NRHP, the renovation qualified for a tax credit.

The Harris Theatre at the building's base was demolished in 1997, and its former entrance was converted to an exit from Madame Tussauds. Massachusetts Mutual planned to lease the base to an entertainment company and rent out the upper stories as offices. At the end of 1999, SFX Entertainment leased all of the building's office space as a headquarters, paying $12 million annually. SFX anticipated that 500 to 600 of its employees would be able to work in the building, and it moved into the building in November 2000. SFX was acquired by Clear Channel Entertainment, which retained offices on 42nd Street. McDonald's signed a lease in early 2001 for the sole retail space in the building. Following a renovation designed by Beyer Blinder Belle, the fast-food restaurant opened at the base of the Candler Building in September 2002. Although the building was not an official city landmark, the New York City Landmarks Preservation Commission determined in 2003 that the Candler Building was eligible for designation as a city landmark.

EPIC Real Estate acquired the building from the Paramount Group in 2012, and Landesbank Baden-Württemberg provided a $150 million loan for the building at that time. In late 2017, EPIC Real Estate refinanced the building $150 million loan from M&T Bank. The McDonald's closed in June 2020 after being replaced by another location nearby. Yellowstone Real Estate Investments took over M&T's note in November 2021. Four months later, in March 2022, Yellowstone acquired the Candler Building in lieu of foreclosure; at the time, the building was worth $161.1 million. In early 2023, amid an increase in the number of people within the city who sought asylum in the United States, the Candler Building's commercial space became a 250-bed shelter for asylum seekers. The following year, Yellowstone filed plans to convert the Candler Building into a 265-room hotel; by then, many of the office floors had been vacant for several years. The commercial space was converted to Tm:rw, a retail space for advanced technologies, in July 2025. Yellowstone changed its plans the next month, which called for converting the upper stories into 192 apartments across 190,000 square feet (18,000 m^{2}).

== See also ==
- National Register of Historic Places listings in Manhattan from 14th to 59th Streets
