= Third Finger, Left Hand =

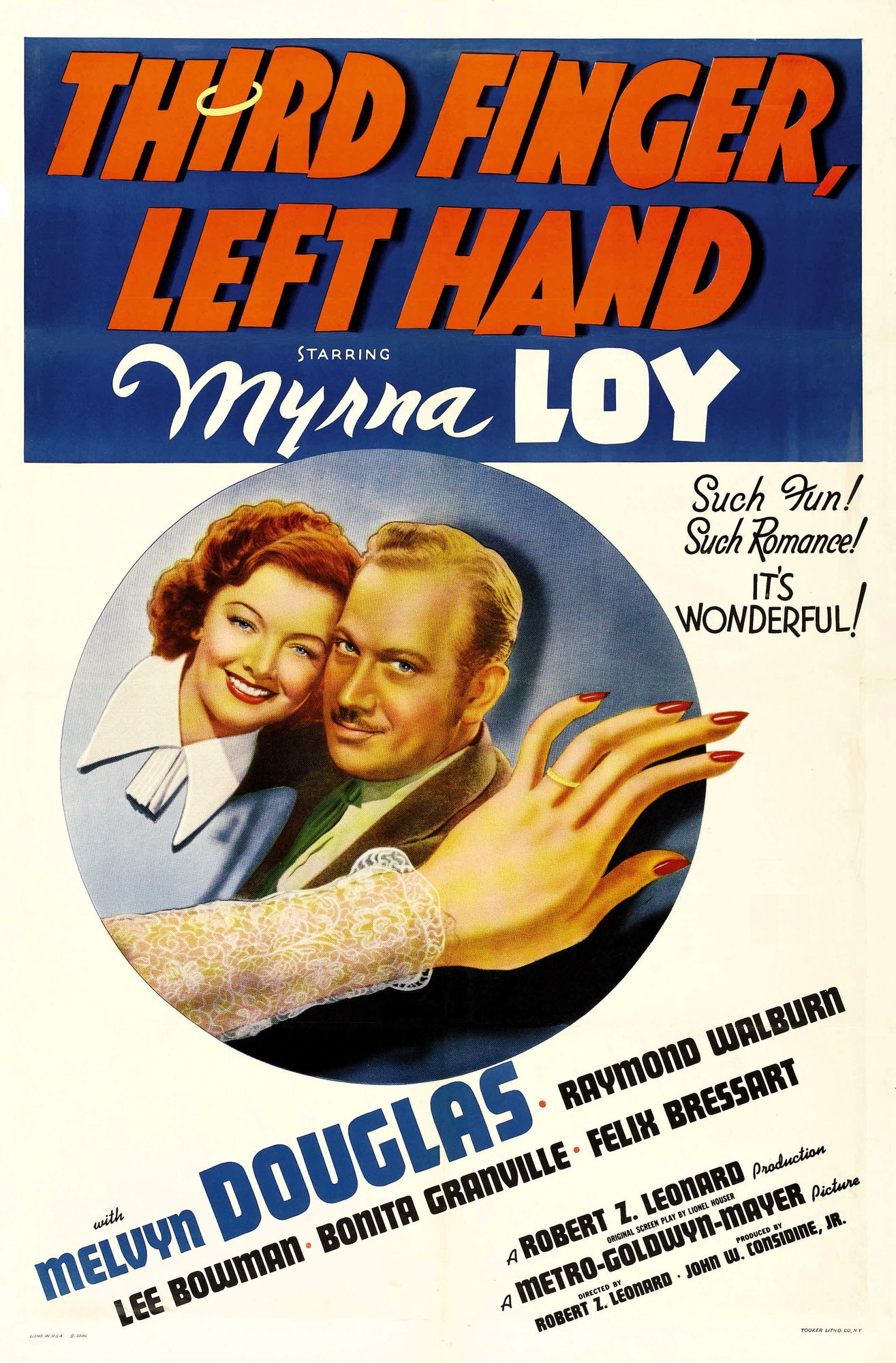
- Theatrical release poster
- Directed by: Robert Z. Leonard
- Written by: Lionel Houser
- Produced by: John W. Considine Jr. Robert Z. Leonard
- Starring: Myrna Loy; Melvyn Douglas; Raymond Walburn
- Cinematography: George J. Folsey
- Edited by: Elmo Veron
- Music by: David Snell; Daniele Amfitheatrof; Edward Ward
- Production company: Metro-Goldwyn-Mayer
- Distributed by: Loew's Inc.
- Release date: October 11, 1940
- Running time: 96 minutes
- Country: United States
- Language: English

Third Finger, Left Hand is a 1940 American romantic comedy film produced by MGM, starring Myrna Loy, co-starring Melvyn Douglas, and featuring Raymond Walburn, Lee Bowman, Bonita Granville, and Felix Bressart in support. Directed by Robert Z. Leonard, the picture concerns a woman who pretends to be married to fend off would-be suitors and jealous wives, then has to live with her deception when she meets an artist who pretends to be her husband.

== Plot ==
New York magazine editor Margot Sherwood "Merrick" invents a husband (who is conveniently away in remote corners of the world) to both safeguard her job and keep aggressive men at bay; the magazine publisher's jealous wife has had the last two women in her position fired after mere months, and Margot is determined to avoid wolves and succeed in her career. She enlists magazine photographer August Winkel to write letters from "Tony Merrick".

One day, she goes to meet a girl friend arriving on a passenger ship. However, when she enters her friend's cabin, she finds some paintings, but no friend. Soon after, art dealer Mr. Flandrin shows up to examine the works. Irritated by Flandrin's brusque attitude and certain that she can get a better deal for her friend, Margot orders him to leave. However, Margot's friend had gotten off at a prior stop, and the paintings actually belong to itinerant artist Jeff Thompson. Jeff runs into Flandrin on deck, only to learn that the insulted dealer is no longer interested in selling his artwork.

When Jeff confronts Margot, she promises to straighten things out. Masquerading as an enthusiastic rival dealer, she manipulates Flandrin into offering Jeff a much better deal than he had ever expected. Mollified, Jeff offers to take her out to dinner to celebrate. She declines, but when her lawyer boyfriend Philip Booth has to cancel their date, she changes her mind.

At a nightclub, a drunken acquaintance spots Margot and mentions her husband, forcing Margot to improvise and tell Jeff that the marriage was merely a passing infatuation in Rio de Janeiro. He believes her at first, but inconsistencies in her story cause him to check up on her; with help from some South American connections, he concludes that there is no Tony Merrick.

To teach her a lesson, he shows up at her wealthy family's mansion and announces to her father that he is the wayward husband. He is welcomed with open arms, joined by Margot's younger sister and the longtime family butler. Skillfully played by Jeff, Margot is left no choice but to go along with the deception.

The next morning, she seeks legal advice from Phillip and confesses all to him. He tells her she cannot "divorce" a man to whom she is not even married. He suggests she first marry Jeff discreetly, then legally divorce him. Philip convinces a reluctant Jeff to go along. The couple head off to Niagara Falls to get married, imagining they will blend unobtrusively in. At the Falls, Jeff runs into some friends from his hometown of Wapakoneta, Ohio. Margot takes the opportunity to exact some revenge, pretending to be a very uncouth, pushy spouse. The friends are appalled.

Margot, Jeff, and Philip then board a train to drop Jeff off in Ohio en route to a Reno divorce and their own planned Grand Canyon honeymoon in Arizona. However, Jeff starts having second thoughts. To buy time, he hires train porter Sam (who has been studying law by correspondence) to draw out the Margo-protecting property settlement negotiations. It doesn't work, and the agreement ends up signed. When Jeff gets off the train he is shocked to receive a rousing ovation from a proud home town crowd. Margo has called ahead to alert the locals, and joins him on the podium in a big public hug. The train leaves without her.

== Cast ==
- Myrna Loy as Margot Sherwood Merrick
- Melvyn Douglas as Jeff Thompson
- Raymond Walburn as Mr. Sherwood
- Lee Bowman as Philip Booth
- Bonita Granville as Vicky Sherwood
- Felix Bressart as August Winkel
- Donald Meek as Mr. Flandrin
- Ann Morriss as Beth Hampshire
- Sidney Blackmer as Hughie Wheeler
- Ernest Whitman as Sam
- Halliwell Hobbes as Burton

== Reception ==
Period reviews were positive, but mixed.

Bosley Crowther of The New York Times dismissed it as "a trifling but sometimes amusing distortion of life—and little more." Variety described the film as "sufficiently light and fluffy in its farcical setup to provide diverting entertainment."
