= Ernest Whitman =

American actor (1893–1954)

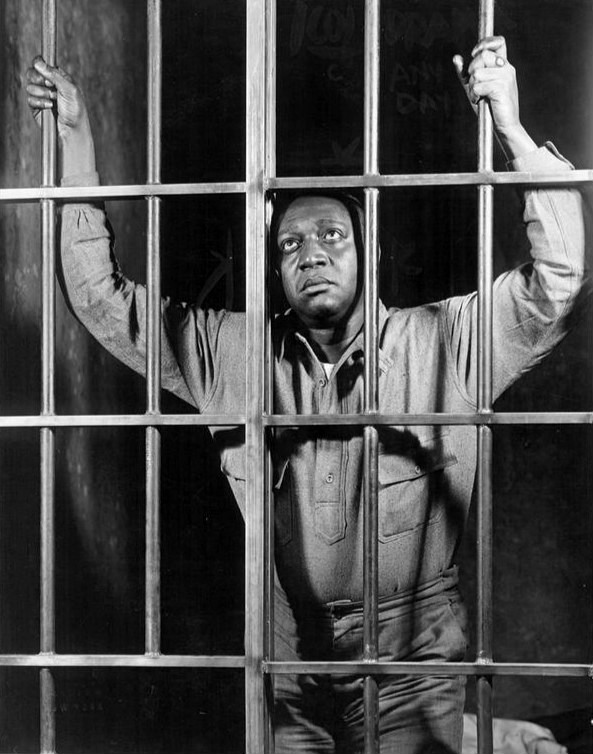
- Whitman as Vincent Jackson in the Broadway play The Last Mile (1930)
- Born: Ernest Whitman; February 21, 1893; Oklahoma City, Oklahoma. U.S.
- Died: August 5, 1954 (aged 61); Hollywood, California, U.S.
- Other name: Ernest R. Whitman
- Occupation: Actor

Ernest Whitman (February 21, 1893 – August 5, 1954) was an American stage and screen actor. He was also billed in some Broadway plays as Ernest R. Whitman.

== Early years ==
Whitman was born in Oklahoma City, Oklahoma, and was educated at Tuskegee Institute. He was ordained as a minister in 1907. His participation in Chautauquas led to his becoming an entertainer in vaudeville.

== Career ==
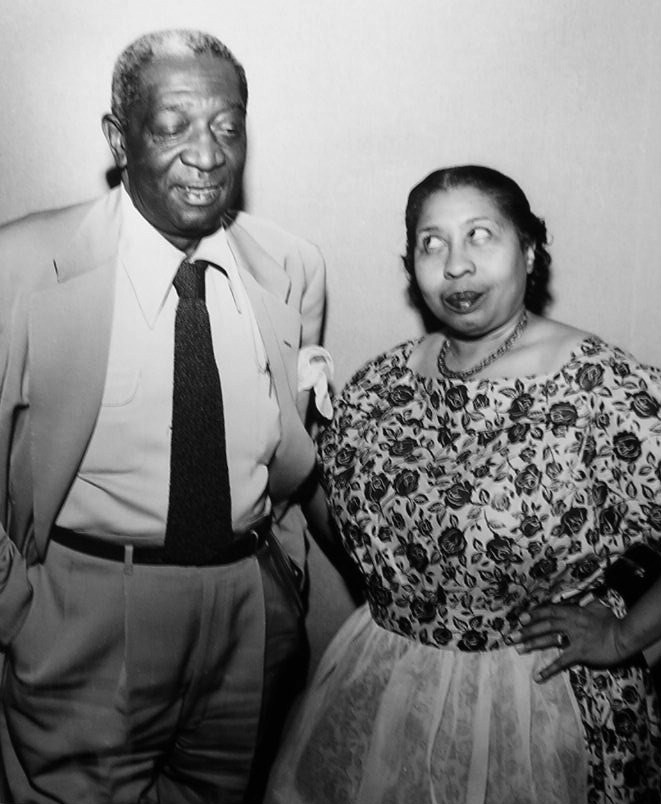
Ernest Whitman as "Bill" with Amanda Randolph in the title role of The Beulah Show on radio (1953)

Whitman debuted as an entertainer in Purcell, Oklahoma. He performed on stage in The Last Mile and other productions. He sang in a touring production of Lucky Sambo (1927).

He appeared in a number of films, including King for a Day (1934), The Prisoner of Shark Island (1936), The Green Pastures (1936), Jesse James (1939), Gone With the Wind (portraying a carpetbagger)(1939), Third Finger, Left Hand (1940), Among the Living (1941), Road to Zanzibar (1941), Cabin in the Sky (1943), Stormy Weather (1943), The Lost Weekend (1945), My Brother Talks to Horses (1947), Banjo (1947) and The Sun Shines Bright (1953), his last movie.

On radio, Whitman was the wartime host of the Armed Forces Radio Service's Jubilee, which was designed for African-American troops and featured mostly African-American entertainers. He portrayed the character Awful on The Gibson Family. He played Bill Jackson on Beulah on radio and on TV.

== Death ==
Whitman died at his home of a liver ailment on August 5, 1954, in Hollywood, aged 61.

== Broadway roles ==
=== Billed as Ernest Whitman ===
- The Last Mile (1930) as Vincent Jackson
- Chamberlain Brown's Scrap Book (1932) as Ashley the penitent

—Source: Internet Broadway Database

=== Billed as Ernest R. Whitman ===
- Harlem (1929) as Kid Vamp and in ensemble
- Savage Rhythm (1931) as Sweetback
- Bloodstream (1932) as Duke Taylor
- The Monster (1933) as Caliban
- John Brown (1934) as Frederick Douglass

—Source: Internet Broadway Database

== Filmography ==
- King for a Day (1934, Short) as Mr. Brown (film debut)
- The Prisoner of Shark Island (1936) as 'Buck' Milford
- The Green Pastures (1936) as Pharaoh
- White Hunter (1936) as Abdi
- They Gave Him a Gun (1937) as Roustabout (uncredited)
- Nothing Sacred (1937) as Policeman (uncredited)
- Daughter of Shanghai (1937) as Sam Blike (uncredited)
- Pacific Liner (1939) as Professor – Black Stoker (uncredited)
- Jesse James (1939) as Pinkie
- Tell No Tales (1939) as Slab Griffin (uncredited)
- 6,000 Enemies (1939) as Black Prisoner Willie Johnson (uncredited)
- Gone With the Wind (1939) as Carpetbagger's Friend (uncredited)
- Congo Maisie (1940) as Varnai
- Castle on the Hudson (1940) as Alexander '8 Ball' Hamilton (uncredited)
- Buck Benny Rides Again (1940) as Colored Gentleman (uncredited)
- Safari (1940) as Witch Doctor (uncredited)
- Maryland (1940) as Dogface
- Mystery Sea Raider (1940) as First Fisherman (uncredited)
- The Return of Frank James (1940) as Pinky
- Third Finger, Left Hand (1940) as Sam
- Santa Fe Trail (1940) as Black Man in Barn (uncredited)
- Back Street (1941) as Porter #1 (uncredited)
- Road to Zanzibar (1941) as Whiteface
- The Get-Away (1941) as 'Moose'
- The Pittsburgh Kid (1941) as Feets Johnson
- Married Bachelor (1941) as Black Men's Room Attendant (uncredited)
- Birth of the Blues (1941) as Fancy-Pants, Doorman (uncredited)
- Blues in the Night (1941) as Black Prisoner #1 (uncredited)
- Among the Living (1941) as Pompey
- Mr. District Attorney in the Carter Case (1941) as Sam (uncredited)
- The Bugle Sounds (1942) as Cartaret
- Drums of the Congo (1942) as King Malaba
- Arabian Nights (1942) as Nubian Slave (uncredited)
- The Human Comedy (1943) as Black Man on Train (uncredited)
- Cabin in the Sky (1943) as Jim Henry
- Stormy Weather (1943) as Jim Europe (uncredited)
- The Impostor (1944) as Ekoua
- The Adventures of Mark Twain (1944) as Stoker (uncredited)
- Goldilocks and the Jivin' Bears (1944, Short) as Narrator (Voice, Uncredited)
- Dillinger (1945) as Jack – Black Prisoner (uncredited)
- The Lost Weekend (1945) as Black Man Talking to Himself (uncredited)
- She Wouldn't Say Yes (1945) as Train Bartender (uncredited)
- My Brother Talks to Horses (1947) as Mr. Mordecai
- Banjo (1947) as Uncle Jasper
- Blonde Savage (1947) as Tonga
- Half-Pint Pygmy (1948, Short) as Pygmy (Voice, Uncredited)
- Beulah (1952, TV) as Bill Jackson
- The Sun Shines Bright (1953) as Pleasant 'Uncle Plez' Woodford (final film)
