= Road to Zanzibar =

1941 film by Victor Schertzinger

- Film poster
- Directed by: Victor Schertzinger
- Screenplay by: Frank Butler; Don Hartman
- Story by: Sy Bartlett; Frank Butler
- Produced by: Paul Jones
- Starring: Bing Crosby; Bob Hope; Dorothy Lamour; Una Merkel
- Cinematography: Ted Tetzlaff
- Edited by: Alma Macrorie
- Music by: Victor Young
- Production company: Paramount Pictures
- Distributed by: Paramount Pictures
- Release date: April 11, 1941
- Running time: 91 minutes
- Country: United States
- Language: English

Road to Zanzibar is a 1941 American musical comedy film directed by Victor Schertzinger and starring Bing Crosby, Bob Hope and Dorothy Lamour, and marked the second of seven pictures in the popular "Road to ..." series made by the trio. It takes place in the Sultanate of Zanzibar. It was produced and distributed by Paramount Pictures.

== Plot ==
The film starts with con-artist Chuck Reardon singing "You Lucky People, You" as a side-show caller at an African circus advertising an act featuring his friend Hubert "Fearless" Frazier. "Fearless" poses as a human cannonball, but quickly substitutes a dummy at the last minute and hides in a secret compartment. The flaming dummy sets the big tent on fire and the two of them flee through Africa. At a fancy restaurant, they're sent champagne by diamond baron Charles Kimble, who convinces Chuck to spend all their money on the deed to one of Kimble's diamond mines. When they find out Kimble is an eccentric and the deed is worthless, Fearless ends their partnership. Later that evening, Fearless comes back with a fistful of money, claiming to have sold the diamond mine to a Monsieur LeBec for a profit. LeBec wants Chuck and Fearless to accompany them to see the mine. Chuck and Fearless manage to escape and jump onto a boat bound for the interior.

Stranded, they are propositioned by Julia Quimby to help rescue her friend Donna LaTour from being sold at a slave auction. Unbeknownst to both of them, Julia and Donna are also con-artists who use the money to buy food. They convince Chuck and Fearless to take them along on safari, not telling them it's to see Donna's wealthy boyfriend. As their journey continues, Chuck and Fearless both vie for Donna's attention.

Eventually, the men learn they've been duped from the beginning and angrily run into the jungle to confront Donna. While she is swimming in the nude, a pair of leopards tear her clothes while she hides in the reeds. Upon seeing her torn clothes, Chuck and Fearless assume she's dead and prepare a funeral. During their attempt at a eulogy, they admit that despite the fact she lied to them, they both loved her. Chuck and Fearless start to sing "It's Always You" and burst into tears, until Donna sings to them and then they both turn on her. They storm off into the jungle and the safari leaves without them.

The men fight their way back to civilization, haggard, dirty and penniless until they sell gold nuggets they had received from the natives. They find the girls and Donna confesses her love for Chuck. The four decide to stay in Zanzibar and start a carnival, which features Julia being sawed in half.

== Cast ==
- Bing Crosby as Chuck Reardon
- Bob Hope as Hubert 'Fearless' Frazier
- Dorothy Lamour as Donna LaTour
- Charles Gemora as Gorilla
- Una Merkel as Julia Quimby
- Eric Blore as Charles Kimble
- Douglass Dumbrille as Slave trader
- Iris Adrian as French soubrette in café
- Lionel Royce as Monsieur Lebec
- Buck Woods as Thonga
- Leigh Whipper as Scarface
- Ernest Whitman as Whiteface
- Noble Johnson as Chief
- Joan Marsh as Dimples, helper in Human Cannonball act
- Luis Alberni as Native booth proprietor
- Robert Middlemass as Police inspector

== Production ==
Paramount executives owned the rights to a story by Sy Bartlett titled "Find Colonel Fawcett" about two men trekking through the jungles of Madagascar. They felt that its plot was so similar to the recently released Stanley and Livingstone (1939) that it could not be made as written without seeming too derivative, so they turned the project over to Frank Butler and Don Hartman, the writers on the wildly successful Road to Singapore which Paramount had released the year before. Thus reborn as a comedy and spoof of the safari genre, the film resembled its predecessor in every important way, with plot taking a back seat to gags (many of them ad libbed), and music. The film was so successful that further "Road to..." pictures were assured.

== Reception ==
Bosley Crowther of The New York Times loved it. "Pity the poor motion picture which ever again sets forth on a perilous (?) African safari, now that Bing Crosby and Bob Hope have traversed the course! For the cheerful report this morning is that the Messrs. Crosby and Hope, with an able left-handed assist from a denatured Dorothy Lamour, have thoroughly ruined the Dark Continent for any future cinematic pursuits. Never again will we hear those jungle drums throbbing menacingly but what we envision Bing and Bob beating a gleeful tattoo upon them. And never again will we behold a file of natives snaking solemnly through the trees without seeing in our mind’s eye the gangling Crosby-Hope expedition as it ambles in and along the Paramount’s “Road to Zanzibar,” which arrived at that house yesterday. Yessir, the heart of darkest Africa has been pierced by a couple of wags... Needless to say, Mr. Crosby and Mr. Hope are most, if not all, of the show—with a slight edge in favor of the latter, in case any one wants to know. Miss Lamour, who is passingly amusing in her frequent attempts to be, assists in the complications and sings a couple of songs... Farce of this sort very seldom comes off with complete effect, but this time it does, and we promise that there's fun on the “Road to Zanzibar.” This time, as Mr. Hope puts it in one of his pungent phrases, they're cooking with gas."

Variety was not so impressed. "‘Zanzibar’ is Paramount's second coupling of Bing Crosby, Bob Hope and Dorothy Lamour following their successful teaming in ‘Road to Singapore’. Although picture has sufficient comedy situations and dialog between its male stars to get over with general audiences in regular runs, it lacks the compactness and spontaneity of its predecessor...The story framework is pretty flimsy foundation for hanging the series of comedy and thrill situations concocted for the pair. It's a fluffy and inconsequential tale, with Crosby-Hope combo, through their individual and collective efforts, doing valiant work to keep up interest... Comedy episodes generally lack sparkle and tempo of ‘Singapore’, and musical numbers are also below par for a Crosby picture. Bing sings two, ‘It’s Always You’ the best candidate..."

== Songs ==
- "You Lucky People, You", performed by Bing Crosby
- "African Etude / Road To Zanzibar", performed by Bing Crosby and a chorus while on safari
- "You're Dangerous", performed by Dorothy Lamour
- "It's Always You", performed by Bing Crosby
- "Birds of a Feather" was written to be sung by Crosby but ultimately it was only included in background music.

All lyrics by Johnny Burke, and music by Jimmy Van Heusen

Bing Crosby recorded a number of the songs for Decca Records. Crosby's songs were also included in the Bing's Hollywood series.
