= The Last Mile (1959 film) =

1959 film

- Theatrical release poster
- Directed by: Howard W. Koch
- Written by: Milton Subotsky; Seton I. Miller
- Based on: the play The Last Mile by John Wexley
- Produced by: Max Rosenberg; Milton Subotsky
- Starring: Mickey Rooney; Alan Bunce; Frank Conroy; Leon Janney; Frank Overton
- Cinematography: Joseph Brun
- Edited by: Robert Brockman; Pat Jaffe
- Music by: Van Alexander
- Distributed by: United Artists
- Release date: January 21, 1959
- Running time: 81 minutes
- Country: United States
- Language: English

The Last Mile is a 1959 American drama film noir directed by Howard W. Koch starring Mickey Rooney. The film is a remake of a 1932 film of the same name starring Preston Foster.

== Plot ==
In a death row cell block nine inmates are scheduled for execution. Then "Killer" John Mears (Rooney) comes along. His viciousness infects the environment and his plans to break out of prison are the catalyst for tragedy.

== Cast ==
- Mickey Rooney as John "Killer John" Mears, Cell 3
- Frank Overton as Father O'Connors
- Michael Constantine as Ed Werner, Cell 1
- John Vari as Jimmy Martin, Cell 2
- Clifford David as Richard Walters, Cell 4
- Harry Millard as Fred Mayor, Cell 5
- John McCurry as Vince Jackson, Cell 6
- Ford Rainey as Red Kirby, Cell 7
- John Seven as Tom D'Amoro, Cell 8
- George Marcy as Pete Rodriguez, Cell 2 (later)
- Donald Barry as Drake
- Leon Janney as Callahan
- Clifton James as Harris
- Milton Selzer as Peddie
- Frank Conroy as O'Flaherty
- Alan Bunce as Warden Stone

== See also ==
- List of American films of 1959
