= The Last Mile (play) =

1930 Broadway play by John Wexley

- First edition 1930
- Original language: English
- Written by: John Wexley
- Genre: Drama
- Setting: Keystone State Penitentiary death-house in Keystone, Oklahoma in late May and June

Premiere
- Date: February 13, 1930
- Place: Sam H. Harris Theatre; New York City, New York

The Last Mile is a Broadway play by John Wexley that ran for 289 performances from February 13, 1930, to October 1930 at the Sam H. Harris Theatre. It was produced by Herman Shumlin and staged by Chester Erskine. It is set in the death row wing of a prison. The lead role of John "Killer" Mears was first played by Spencer Tracy, and it was the role that brought him to the attention of Hollywood. It was later played for a time by Clark Gable on tour. The play was adapted into a 1932 film starring Preston Foster and into a 1959 film starring Mickey Rooney.

== Cast ==
- Howard Phillips as Fred Mayor
- James Bell as Richard Walters
- Hale Norcross as "Red" Kirby
- Ernest Whitman as Vincent Jackson
- George Leach as Eddie Werner
- Don Costello as Drake
- Spencer Tracy as John Mears
- Herbert Heywood as O'Flaherty
- Orville Harris as Peddie
- Ralph Theodore as Principal Keeper Callahan
- Richard Abbott as Harris
- Joseph Calleia as Tom D'Amoro
- Henry O'Neill as Father O'Connors
- Clarence Chase as Evangelist
- Bruce MacFarlane as Frost
- Albert West as Brooks
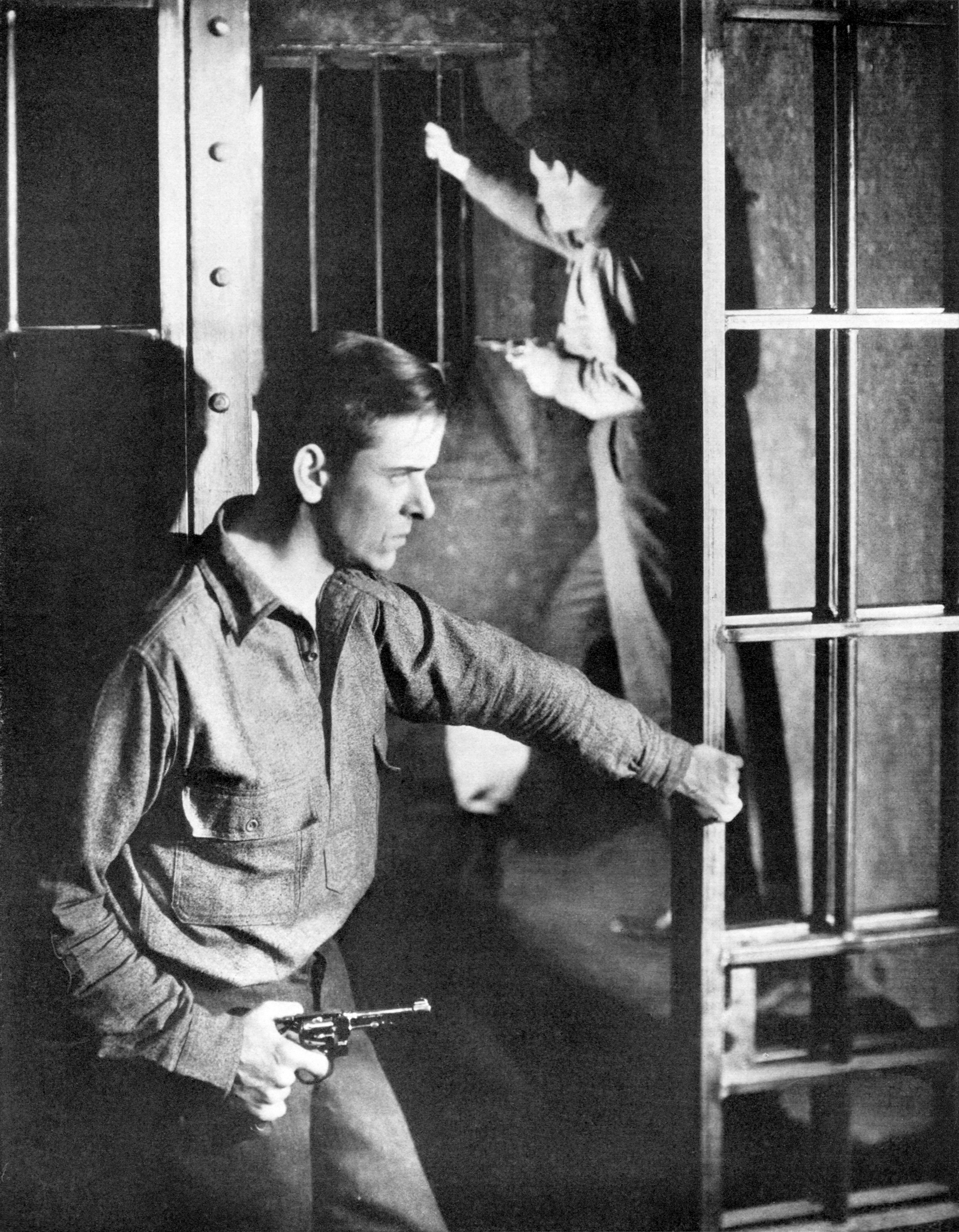
Howard Phillips and Spencer Tracy in The Last Mile

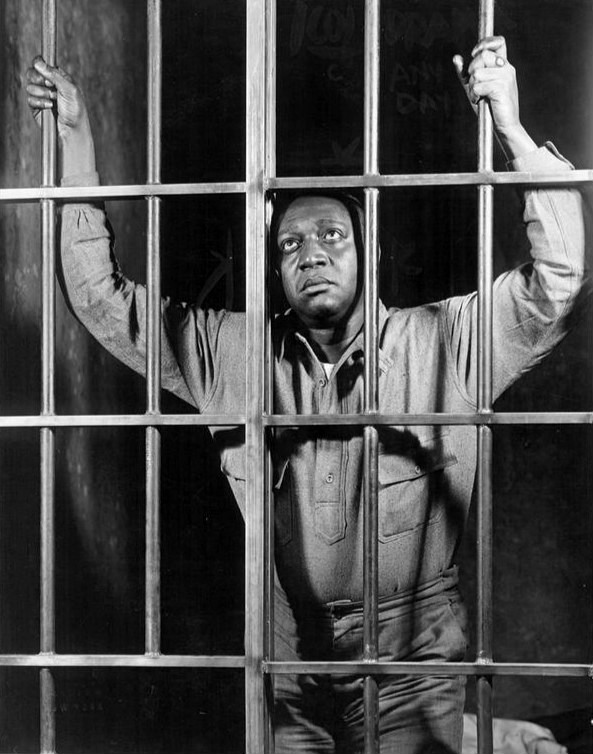
Ernest Whitman in The Last Mile

== Adaptations ==
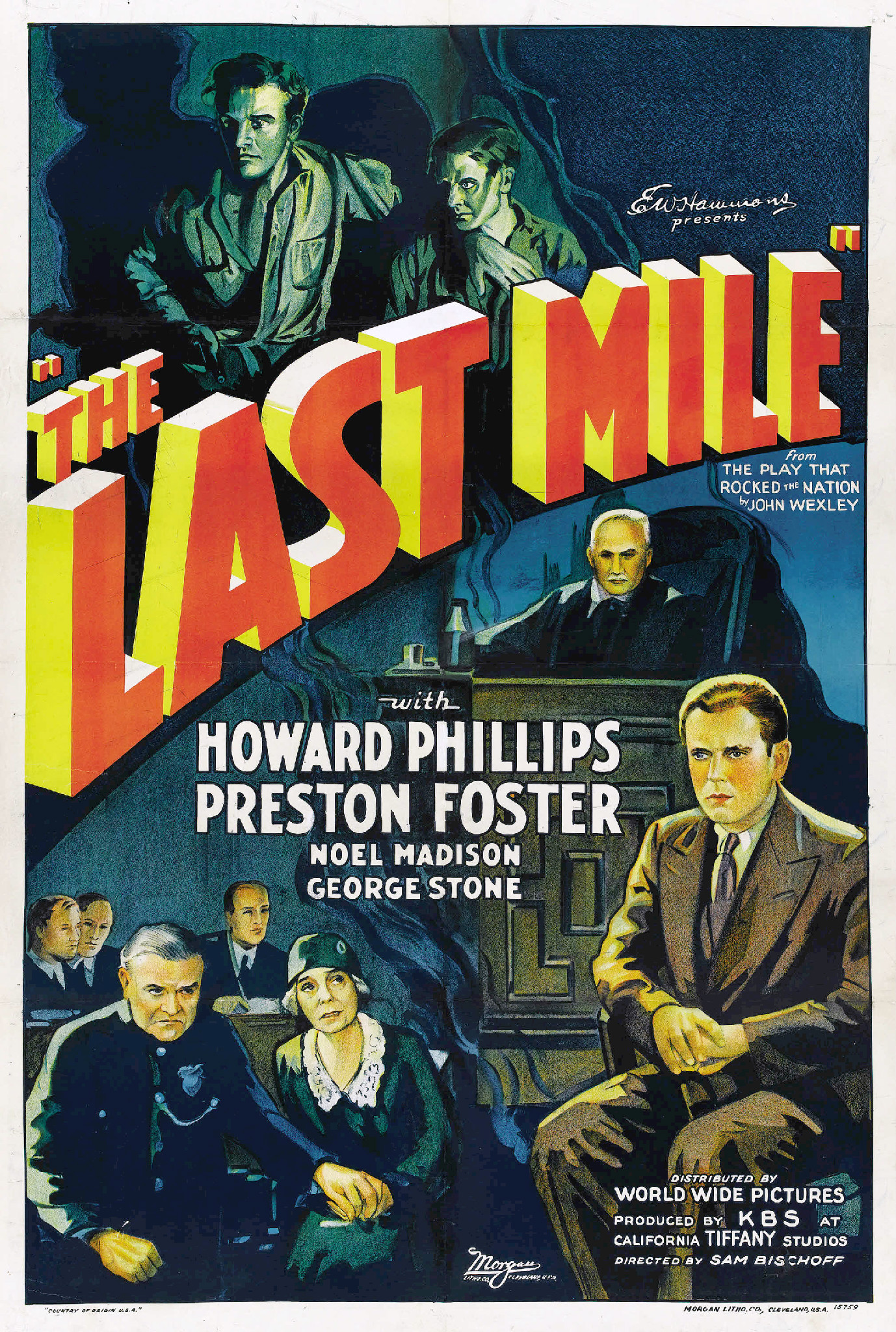
Poster for The Last Mile (1932)

The Last Mile was adapted for a 1932 feature film directed by Samuel Bischoff. The film took a number of liberties with the original story, toning down its grim realism and shifting the emphasis from Killer Mears (Preston Foster) to Richard Walters (Howard Phillips).

A 1959 adaptation starring Mickey Rooney as Mears was directed by Howard W. Koch.
