= The Last Mile (1932 film) =

1932 American crime drama film

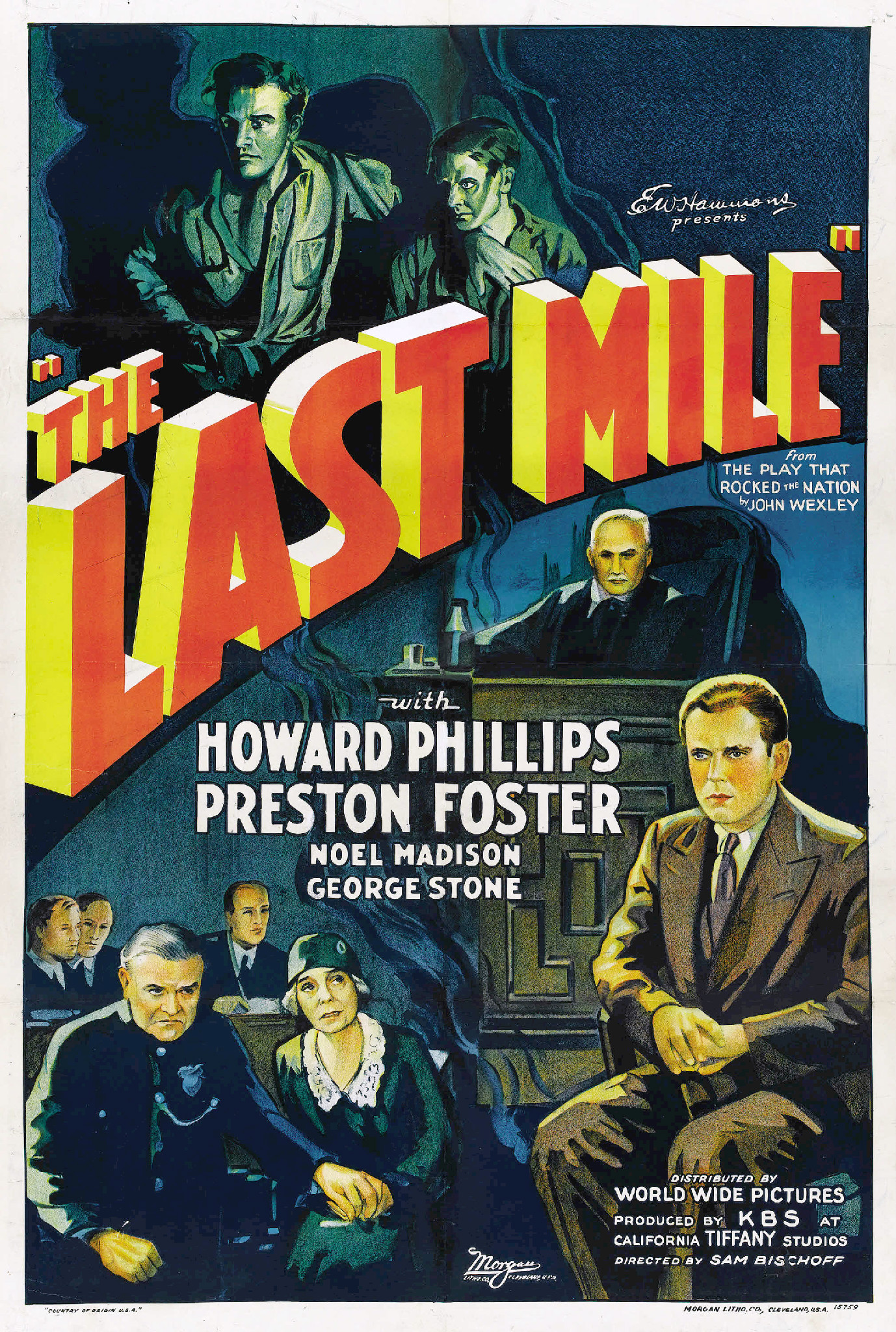
- Film poster
- Directed by: Samuel Bischoff
- Written by: Seton I. Miller
- Based on: The play The Last Mile by John Wexley
- Produced by: Samuel Bischoff
- Starring: Preston Foster
- Cinematography: Arthur Edeson
- Edited by: Rose Loewinger
- Production company: K.B.S. Productions
- Distributed by: Sono Art-World Wide Pictures
- Release date: August 17, 1932
- Running time: 75 minutes
- Country: United States
- Language: English

The Last Mile is a 1932 American pre-Code crime drama film directed by Samuel Bischoff and starring Preston Foster. The picture is based on John Wexley's 1930 Broadway play, The Last Mile. Actor Howard Phillips appeared in both the play and the film but in different roles. In 1959, the play was adapted a second time into a film of the same name starring Mickey Rooney.

== Plot ==
The movie presents life in a prison where men are on death row. Some of them are wrongfully accused and convicted; there is nothing in their future but the electric chair.

Richard Walters is condemned to death for a crime he claims he did not commit. While the drama inside the prison unfolds, his friends on the outside are trying to find evidence that he is innocent.

== Cast ==
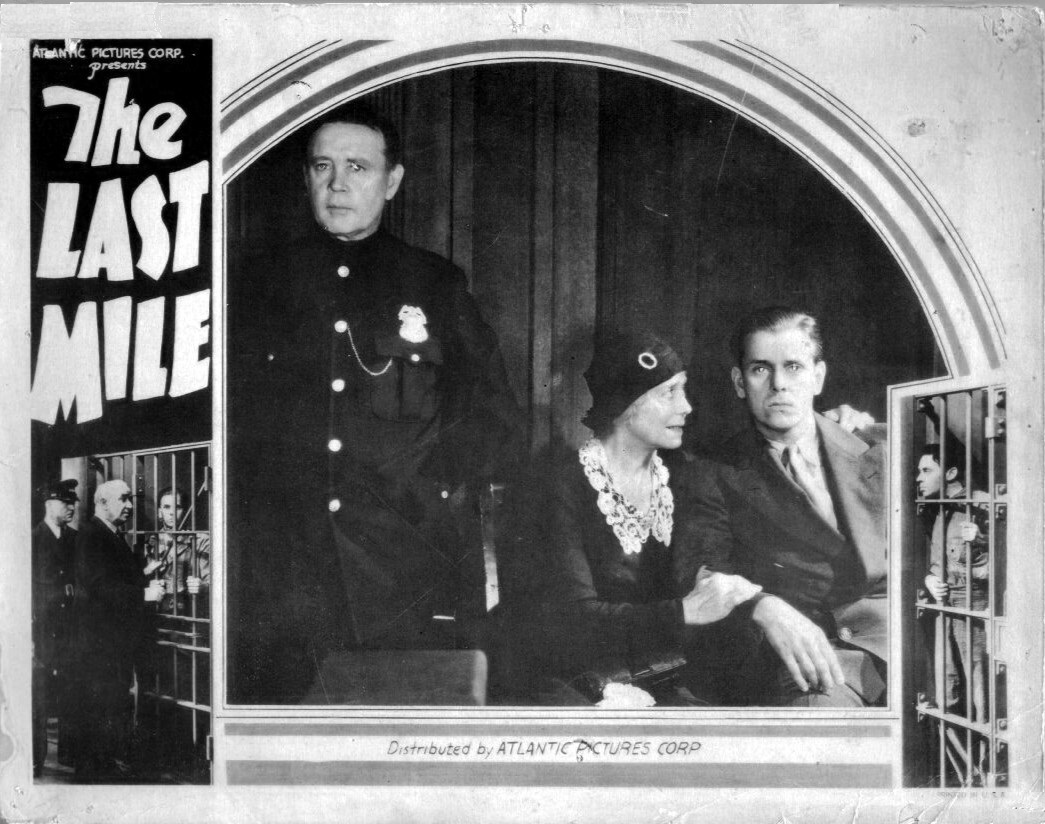
Lobby card for The Last Mile

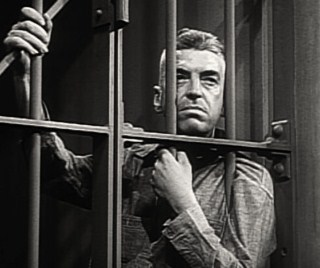
Alan Roscoe in the film

- Howard Phillips as Richard "Dick" Walters, Cell 5
- Preston Foster as John "Killer" Mears, Cell 4
- George E. Stone as Joe Berg, Cell 1
- Noel Madison as D'Amoro, Cell 6
- Alan Roscoe as Kirby, Cell 7
- Paul Fix as Eddie Werner, Cell 8
- Al Hill as Fred Mayer, Cell 3
- Daniel L. Haynes as Sonny Jackson, Cell 2
- Frank Sheridan as Warden Frank Lewis
- Alec B. Francis as Father O'Connor
- Edward Van Sloan as Rabbi
- Louise Carter as Mrs. Walters
- Ralph Theodore as Pat Callahan, Principal Keeper
- Jack Kennedy as Mike O'Flaherty, Guard
- Albert J. Smith as Drake, Guard
- William Scott as Peddie, Guard
- Kenneth MacDonald as Harris, Guard
- Walter Walker as Governor Blaine
- John T. Prince as Jury Member

== Notes ==
A clip from this film was used by progressive rock band Rush as their introduction to the song "Lock and Key" during its performance on the Hold Your Fire tour, later released on the A Show of Hands laserdisc. The VHS and DVD versions of the film omit the song.

Both Spencer Tracy and Clark Gable played Killer Mears onstage in 1930, Tracy on Broadway and Gable later in Los Angeles, which benefited the careers of both men.
