= The Monkey Talks (play) =

Le Singe qui parle, better known in English as The Monkey Talks, is a comedy in three acts by René Fauchois. It premiered at the Comédie-Caumartin in Paris on October 8, 1924. Positively received, it was subsequently staged at the Royal Park Theatre in Brussels where a production opened on October 8, 1924.

American author Gladys Unger adapted the play into English using the title The Monkey Talks. Her English language version of the play was staged on Broadway at the Sam H. Harris Theatre where it opened on December 28, 1925. Unger's adaptation of the play had previously been used but in a further modified version by English-born American writer Rowland Leigh who changed portions of it for the London production which preceded the New York staging. Leigh's altered version of Unger's translation premiered in London at the Little Theatre on September 9, 1925. It subsequently transferred to the Duke of York's Theatre in London's West End.

American screenwriter Gordon Rigby adapted Fauchois's story for the silent film, The Monkey Talks. Made by the Fox Film Corporation and directed by Raoul Walsh, it premiered on February 20, 1927.
