= John Wexley =

American playwright and screenwriter (1907–1985)

- Born: September 14, 1907; New York City, U.S.
- Died: February 4, 1985 (aged 77); Doylestown, Pennsylvania, U.S.
- Occupations: Playwright, screenwriter, author
- Writing career
- Notable work: The Last Mile

John Wexley (September 14, 1907 – February 4, 1985) was an American playwright, screenwriter, and author. He came to prominence in 1930 when his prison drama The Last Mile was a Broadway hit. He then went to Hollywood to write screenplays, including The Amazing Dr. Clitterhouse, Angels with Dirty Faces, Confessions of a Nazi Spy, and Cornered. His film career was cut short by the Hollywood blacklist. In his later years, he researched and wrote about the Rosenberg espionage case.

== Early life and career ==
Wexley was born in 1907 in Manhattan, not far from Central Park. His family was Jewish; he was the nephew of Maurice Schwartz, the noted Yiddish actor and founder of the Yiddish Art Theatre. After attending New York University, Wexley decided to pursue a career on the stage. He auditioned at the Neighborhood Playhouse, and was rewarded with a small role in The Dybbuk. He then traveled around the U.S. on "a bumming trip", as he called it, taking odd jobs and gathering source material he would subsequently use in his writing. When he returned to New York City, he joined Eva Le Gallienne's Civic Repertory Theatre as an actor. He landed roles in productions such as Three Sisters and Twelfth Night, but was also starting to write one-act plays.

=== Theatre ===
Wexley's first full-length play, The Last Mile (1930), became one of the most famous prison dramas of the 1930s. The story focuses on "the final hours of a condemned man's life and the prison uprising that follows his execution". Brooks Atkinson of The New York Times called it "a taut, searing drama" and "an evening of nerve-racking tension in the theatre". The lead role of John "Killer" Mears helped make Spencer Tracy a Broadway star. When a Pacific coast production was produced by Lillian Albertson at the Majestic Theatre in Los Angeles, the young, unknown actor Clark Gable played the Mears role and garnered Hollywood film studio attention. The Last Mile was adapted for the screen in 1932 and again in 1959.

In November 1931, Wexley's play Steel ran for two weeks at the Times Square Theatre. In 1934, he completed They Shall Not Die, a dramatization of the Scottsboro case and trials. It was first performed at Broadway's Royale Theatre in March 1934. Brooks Atkinson described it as "a play of terrifying and courageous bluntness of statement". A film adaptation of They Shall Not Die was planned in 1950 by Charles K. Feldman, with Wexley writing the screenplay, but the film was never produced.

In 1937, Steel was performed at the Labor Stage by members of the International Ladies Garment Workers Union, where it had a successful run in New York and then went on a national tour. In 1945, he wrote Tears Without Laughter, which depicts Nazi plots to establish cartels in the U.S. The play was written in the hope that it would attract the husband-wife acting duo of Alfred Lunt and Lynn Fontanne. In January 1947, Wexley directed his play Carrot and Club, about a returning World War II veteran, at the Shubert Theatre in New Haven.

=== Film ===
In the early 1930s, Wexley was moving back and forth between New York City and Hollywood. In 1937 he signed a seven-year contract with Warner Bros. and settled in Los Angeles. He wrote or co-wrote multiple screenplays that were made into Hollywood films. These included Angels with Dirty Faces and The Amazing Dr. Clitterhouse in 1938, Confessions of a Nazi Spy in 1939, Hangmen Also Die! in 1943, and The Long Night in 1947. In 1945, he wrote the story for Cornered. He also made uncredited contributions to the screenplays for The Roaring Twenties (1939) and Song of Russia (1943).

Among his unproduced work was an original screenplay in 1943 for a film titled Malta. It was due to be produced by Joe Pasternak and distributed by MGM. Philip Dorn and Donna Reed were cast to star in it. In the early 1940s, Wexley had written a screenplay about General Mark W. Clark. The film, titled Advance Agent to Africa, was warned against by the State Department and War Department, apparently due to its accurate descriptions of U.S. Army tactics. The film project was cancelled by Paramount Pictures in 1943.

=== Communist links ===
Wexley was named numerous times to the House Un-American Activities Committee (HUAC) as a communist or communist sympathiser. In April 1951, he was identified by Edward Dmytryk as a member of the Communist Party USA (CPUSA). In March 1953, film writer David A. Lang testified that Wexley was one of several writers who had attended CPUSA meetings. In May 1953, Robert Rossen included Wexley on a list of over fifty "Hollywood Reds" supplied to the HUAC, and Wexley was also named by George Beck, Martin Berkeley, Bart Lytton, and Paul Benedict Radin. Both Wexley and his wife Katharine were named by their friends Leo and Pauline Townsend.

Wexley was blacklisted, and some of his previous writings were attacked for being pro-communist. For example, the theatre reviewer of the NAACP's magazine The Crisis referred to the play They Shall Not Die as "propaganda for the Communist party transferred to the stage".

In an article about Wexley's friend and Hangmen Also Die! co-writer Bertolt Brecht, Graham Petrie stated that Wexley was a member of the CPUSA. However, Patrick McGilligan and Ken Mate reported otherwise after interviewing Wexley in 1983:

[Wexley] liked to say in private that the irony was that he never joined the Communist Party, because he didn't care for the dues-paying; people who knew him well said it might be true, since the writer was notorious among his acquaintances for his thriftiness.

=== Rosenberg case ===
After Julius and Ethel Rosenberg were executed for atomic espionage in June 1953, Wexley became interested in their case. Unable to find work as a screenwriter, he began to research the U.S. government's evidence against the Rosenbergs. He retraced the steps of the trial's key witnesses, in particular, Harry Gold.

In 1955, Wexley published The Judgment of Julius and Ethel Rosenberg, which was one of the first detailed rebuttals of the prosecution's case. Over the next two decades, he followed developments in the Rosenberg story and published a revised edition of his book in 1977.

== Personal life ==
In spring of 1930, Wexley took a two-month vacation in Europe. On the return ship to the U.S., he met his future wife, Austrian-born painter Katharine Honig. They had a daughter Thea.

Wexley briefly served in the U.S. Army in WWII. After he was discharged in 1945, he made the local news when he was knocked down and beaten by five men outside a V-J Day party in Los Angeles. Wexley pressed charges against the man he identified as the principal instigator of the assault.

In his later years, Wexley did some lecturing and writing. He and Katharine retired to Doylestown, Pennsylvania. He died there of a heart attack on February 4, 1985, at the age of 77.

== Published works ==
=== Plays ===
- The Last Mile (1930)
- Steel (1931)
- They Shall Not Die (1934)
- Tears Without Laughter (1945)
- Carrot and Club (1947)

=== Books ===
- The Judgment of Julius and Ethel Rosenberg (1955) (1977)

== Filmography ==
Year	Film	Notes	Ref.
1935	Eight Bells	Screenplay; uncredited	
1938	Angels with Dirty Faces	Screenplay	
1938	The Amazing Dr. Clitterhouse	Screenplay; with John Huston	
1939	Confessions of a Nazi Spy	Screenplay	
1939	The Roaring Twenties	Screenplay; uncredited	
1940	City for Conquest	Screenplay	
1941	Footsteps in the Dark	Screenplay; with Lester Cole	
1943	Hangmen Also Die!	Screenplay; with Bertolt Brecht	
1943	The City That Stopped Hitler – Heroic Stalingrad	Wrote the documentary narration	
1943	Song of Russia	Screenplay; uncredited	
1945	Cornered	Story and adaptation	
1947	The Long Night	Screenplay	
1959	The Last Mile	Screenplay; uncredited	
