= List of Broadway theaters =

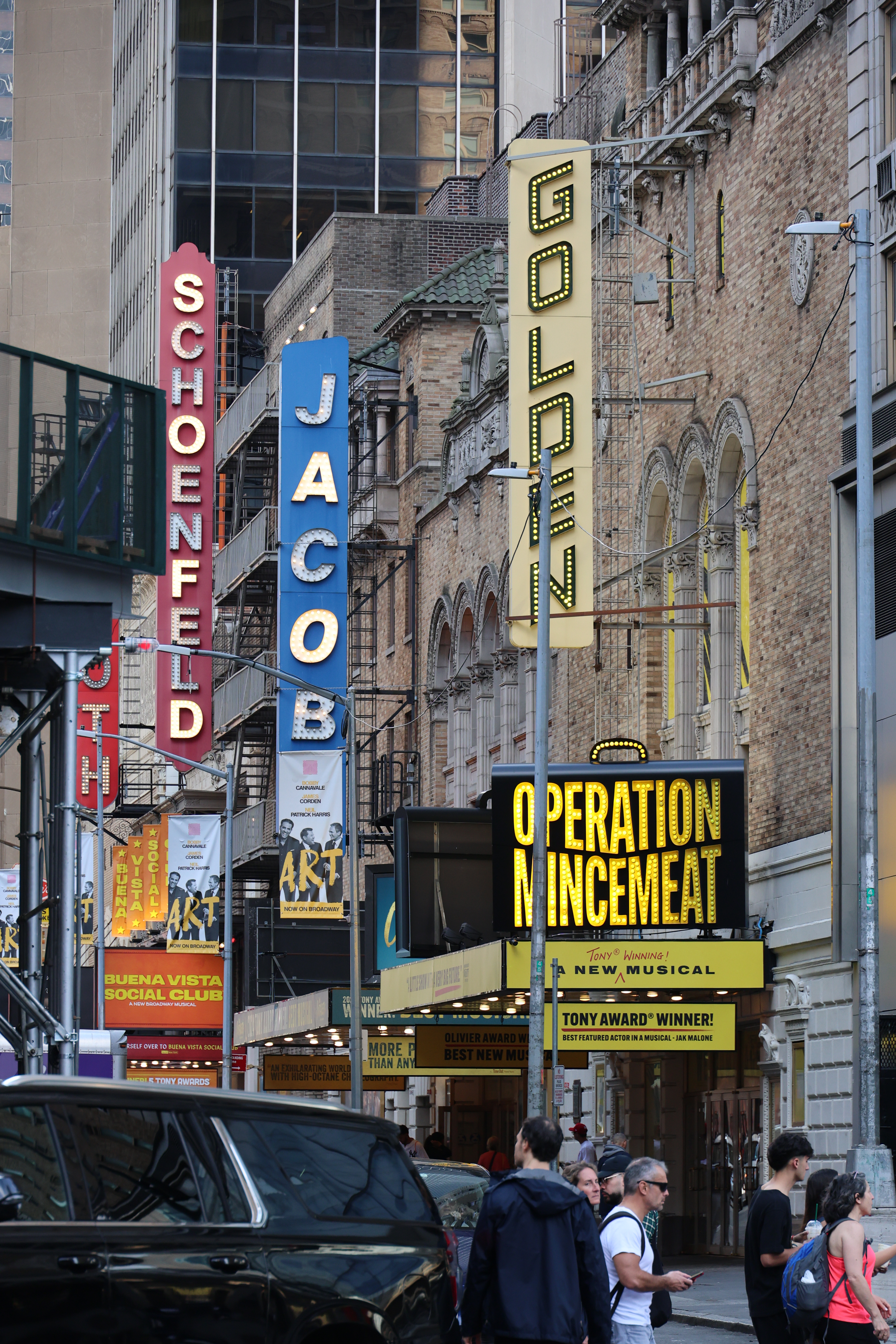
The Minskoff Theatre, Booth Theatre, Gerald Schoenfeld Theatre, Bernard B. Jacobs Theatre, and John Golden Theatre on West 45th Street in Manhattan's Theater District

There are 41 active Broadway theaters listed by The Broadway League in New York City, as well as eight existing structures that previously hosted Broadway theatre. (Note: The theatre versus theater spelling reflects that, of these 49 extant properties, 47 do (or did) use "Theatre" as the proper noun in their name. Of the 144 total venues in this list article, 130 use/used "Theatre", 12 did not use any variation of the word, and only two solely used "Theater") Beginning with the first large long-term theater in the city, the Park Theatre built in 1798 on Park Row just off Broadway, the definition of what constitutes a Broadway theater has changed multiple times. The current legal definition is based on a 1949 Actors' Equity agreement with smaller theaters in New York to allow union members to perform, dividing theater spaces in the city into the system of Broadway and Off-Broadway seen today. Current union contracts clearly spell out if a production is "Broadway" or not, but the general rule is that any venue that mostly hosts legitimate theater productions, is generally within Manhattan's Theater District, and has a capacity over 500 seats is considered a Broadway theater. Previous to this legal demarcation a Broadway production simply referred to a professional theatrical production performed in a theater in Manhattan, and the theaters that housed them were called Broadway theaters.

While Broadway theaters are colloquially considered to be "on Broadway", only two active Broadway theaters are physically on Broadway (the Broadway Theatre and Winter Garden Theatre). (Note: The Palace Theatre had an entrance on Broadway until 2018, when it closed for renovation; its new entrance is on 47th Street.) The Vivian Beaumont Theater, located in Lincoln Center, is the furthest north and west of the active theaters, while the Nederlander Theatre is the southernmost and the Belasco Theatre is the easternmost space. The oldest Broadway theaters still in use are the Hudson Theatre, Lyceum Theatre, and New Amsterdam Theatre, all opened in 1903, while the most recently constructed theater is the Lyric Theatre, built in 1998. The largest of the Broadway theaters is the 1,933-seat Gershwin Theatre, while the smallest is the 597-seat Hayes Theater.

The beginning of Broadway theater can be traced to the 19th-century influx of immigrants to New York City, particularly Yiddish, German and Italian, who brought with them indigenous and new forms of theater. The development of indoor gas lighting around this same time period allowed for the construction of permanent spaces for these novel theatrical forms. Early variety, burlesque, and minstrelsy halls were built along Broadway below Houston Street. As the city expanded north, new theaters were constructed along the thoroughfare with family-friendly vaudeville, developed by Tony Pastor, clustering around Union Square in the 1860s and 1870s, and larger opera houses, hippodromes, and theaters populating Broadway between Union Square and Times Square later in the century. Times Square became the epicenter for large scale theater productions between 1900 and the Great Depression.

There is no standard date that is considered the beginning of Broadway-style theatre. A few landmarks that are considered the beginning of the Broadway era include the 1866 opening of The Black Crook at Niblo's Garden, considered the first piece of American style musical theater, the 1913 founding of the Actors' Equity Association, the union for New York Theater performers, and the 1919 Actors' Equity Association strike which gave actors and performers the recognition of a "fully legitimate professional trade". Mary Henderson in her book The City and the Theatre breaks down theater on the street Broadway into three time periods. "Lower Broadway" from 1850 to 1870, "Union Square and Beyond" from 1870 to 1899, and "Times Square: the First Hundred Years" (1900–2000). The current official Broadway/Off-Broadway division began with the 1949 Actors' Equity agreement.

== Active Broadway theaters ==
The current definition of a Broadway theater is based on the 1949 Actors' Equity agreement dividing Broadway from Off-Broadway, but in the general psyche Broadway theaters are considered theatrical houses which host productions that can be nominated for Tony Awards. The American Theater Wing and The Broadway League, as presenters of these awards, have sole discretion to include or omit theaters from the list of Tony-eligible houses, but use the same standards and criteria as Actors' Equity does. The four main underlying criteria these organizations use to determine a Broadway theater are:

- Has a capacity of over 500 seats.
- Produces mostly legitimate theater productions.
- Is generally within Manhattan's Theater District (the Vivian Beaumont Theater is an exception)
- Is under an Actors' Equity "Production" contract if the theater is for-profit, or follows an Actors' Equity "LORT A" contract if the theater is run by a non-profit.

The following list contains the 41 theaters listed on the Internet Broadway Database, which is run by The Broadway League, that are considered active Broadway theaters and can host productions eligible for Tony Awards.

Theater former name(s)	Address	Opened	Capacity (Note: All capacity numbers are approximate per the source.)	Owner/operator	Productions			Image	Ref.
Theater former name(s)	Address	Opened	Capacity	Owner/operator	First	Longest run	Current	Image	Ref.
Al Hirschfeld Theatre Martin Beck Theatre (1924–2003)	302 W. 45th St.	1924	1,424	ATG Entertainment	Madame Pompadour	Kinky Boots		Al Hirschfeld Theatre	
Ambassador Theatre New Ambassador Theatre (1980) Ambassador Theatre (1921–1980)	219 W. 49th St.	1921	1,125	Shubert Organization	The Rose Girl	Chicago	Chicago	Ambassador Theatre.	
August Wilson Theatre Virginia Theatre (1981–2005) American Academy of Dramatic Arts (1953–1981) ANTA Playhouse (1950–1953) WOR Mutual Radio (1943–1950) Guild Theatre (1925–1943)	245 W. 52nd St.	1925	1,228	ATG Entertainment	Caesar and Cleopatra	Jersey Boys	Paranormal Activity	August Wilson Theatre.	
Belasco Theatre Stuyvesant Theatre (1907–1910)	111 W. 44th St.	1907	1,018	Shubert Organization	A Grand Army Man	Maybe Happy Ending	Maybe Happy Ending	Belasco Theatre.	
Bernard B. Jacobs Theatre Royale Theatre (1940–2005) John Golden Theatre (1934–1940) Royale Theatre (1927–1934)	242 W. 45th St.	1927	1,078	Shubert Organization	Piggy	Grease	The Outsiders	Bernard B. Jacobs Theatre.	
Booth Theatre	222 W. 45th St.	1913	766	Shubert Organization	The Great Adventure	Butterflies Are Free	Downstate	Booth Theatre.	
Broadhurst Theatre	235 W. 44th St.	1917	1,186	Shubert Organization	Misalliance	Amadeus	It's a Wonderful Life: A Live Radio Play	Broadhurst Theatre.	
Broadway Theatre Cine Roma (1937–1939) B.S. Moss's Broadway Theatre (1935–1937) Broadway Theatre (1933–1935) Earl Carroll's Broadway Theatre (1932–1933) B.S. Moss's Broadway Theatre (1930–1932) Universal's Colony Theatre (1926–1930) B.S. Moss's Colony Theatre (1924–1926)	1681 Broadway	1924	1,761	Shubert Organization	The New Yorkers	Miss Saigon	The Great Gatsby	Broadway Theatre.	
Circle in the Square Theatre	235 W. 50th St.	1972	840	Independent	Mourning Becomes Electra	The 25th Annual Putnam County Spelling Bee	Just in Time	Circle in the Square Theatre	
Ethel Barrymore Theatre	243 W. 47th St.	1928	1,096	Shubert Organization	The Kingdom of God	I Love My Wife	Here There Are Blueberries	Ethel Barrymore Theatre.	
Eugene O'Neill Theatre Coronet Theatre (1945–1959) Forrest Theatre (1925–1945)	230 W. 49th St.	1925	1,066	ATG Entertainment	Mayflowers	The Book of Mormon	The Book of Mormon	Eugene O'Neill Theatre.	
Gerald Schoenfeld Theatre Plymouth Theatre (1917–2005)	236 W. 45th St.	1917	1,079	Shubert Organization	A Successful Calamity	Come from Away	Buena Vista Social Club	Gerald Schoenfeld Theatre.	
Gershwin Theatre Uris Theatre (1972–1983)	222 W. 51st St.	1972	1,933	Nederlander Organization	Via Galactica	Wicked	Wicked	Gershwin Theatre.	
Hayes Theater Helen Hayes Theatre (1983–2018) Little Theatre (1965–1983) Winthrop Ames Theatre (1964–1965) Little Theatre (1959–1964) New York Times Hall (1941–1959) Anne Nichols' Little Theatre (1936–1941) Little Theatre (1912–1936)	240 W. 44th St.	1912	597	Second Stage Theater	The Pigeon	Gemini	The Fantasticks	Hayes Theater.	
Hudson Theatre Savoy Nightclub (1981–1987) Hudson Theatre (1903–1981)	141 W. 44th St.	1903	975	ATG Entertainment	Cousin Kate	State of the Union	Other Desert Cities	Hudson Theatre.	
Imperial Theatre	249 W. 45th St.	1923	1,443	Shubert Organization	Mary Jane McKane	Les Misérables	860	Imperial Theatre.	
James Earl Jones Theatre Cort Theatre (1912–2022)	138 W. 48th St.	1912	1,084	Shubert Organization	Peg o' My Heart	The Magic Show	Wanted	James Earl Jones Theatre.	
John Golden Theatre Theatre Masque (1927–1937)	252 W. 45th St.	1927	805	Shubert Organization	Puppets of Passion	Avenue Q	Operation Mincemeat	John Golden Theatre.	
Lena Horne Theatre Brooks Atkinson Theatre (1960–2022) Mansfield Theatre (1929–1960) Lew Fields' Mansfield Theatre (1928–1929) Mansfield Theatre (1926–1928)	256 W. 47th St.	1926	1,094	Nederlander Organization	The Night Duel	Six	Six	Brooks Atkinson Theater.	
Longacre Theatre	220 W. 48th St.	1913	1,091	Shubert Organization	Are You a Crook?	Children of a Lesser God	Two Strangers (Carry a Cake Across New York)	Longacre Theatre.	
Lunt-Fontanne Theatre Globe Theatre (1910–1957)	205 W. 46th St.	1910	1,519	Nederlander Organization	The Old Town	Beauty and the Beast		Lunt-Fontanne Theatre.	
Lyceum Theatre New Lyceum Theatre (1903)	149 W. 45th St.	1903	922	Shubert Organization	The Proud Prince	Born Yesterday	Oh, Mary!	Lyceum Theatre.	
Lyric Theatre Foxwoods Theatre (2010–2014) Hilton Theatre (2005–2010) Ford Center for the Performing Arts (1998–2005)	214 W. 43rd St.	1998	1,622	ATG Entertainment	Ragtime	Harry Potter and the Cursed Child	Harry Potter and the Cursed Child	Lyric Theatre.	
Majestic Theatre	245 W. 44th St.	1927	1,645	Shubert Organization	Rufus LeMaire's Affairs	The Phantom of the Opera		Majestic Theatre.	
Marquis Theatre	210 W. 46th St.	1986	1,612	Nederlander Organization	Shirley Bassey	Me and My Girl	Stranger Things: The First Shadow	Marquis Theatre.	
Minskoff Theatre	200 W. 45th St.	1973	1,710	Nederlander Organization	Irene	The Lion King	The Lion King	Minskoff Theatre.	
Music Box Theatre	239 W. 45th St.	1921	1,009	Shubert Organization	Music Box Revue (1921)	Dear Evan Hansen		Music Box Theatre.	
Nederlander Theatre Trafalgar Theatre (1979–1980) Billy Rose Theatre (1959–1979) National Theatre (1921–1959)	208 W. 41st St.	1921	1,235	Nederlander Organization	Swords	Rent	Schmigadoon!	Nederlander Theatre.	
Neil Simon Theatre Alvin Theatre (1927–1983)	250 W. 52nd St.	1927	1,467	Nederlander Organization	Funny Face	Hairspray	MJ the Musical	Neil Simon Theatre.	
New Amsterdam Theatre	214 W. 42nd St.	1903	1,747	Disney Theatrical Group	A Midsummer Night's Dream	The Lion King	Aladdin	New Amsterdam Theatre.	
Palace Theatre	160 W. 47th St.	1913	1,743	Nederlander Organization	Miss Civilization	Beauty and the Beast	The Lost Boys	Palace Theatre	
Richard Rodgers Theatre 46th Street Theatre (1932–1990) Chanin's 46th Street Theatre (1925–1932)	226 W. 46th St.	1925	1,400	Nederlander Organization	The Greenwich Village Follies (1925)	Hamilton	Hamilton	Richard Rodgers Theatre.	
Samuel J. Friedman Theatre Biltmore Theatre (1925–2008)	261 W. 47th St.	1925	650	Manhattan Theatre Club	Easy Come, Easy Go	Hair	School Girls; Or, the African Mean Girls Play	Samuel J. Friedman Theatre.	
Shubert Theatre	225 W. 44th St.	1913	1,460	Shubert Organization	Hamlet	A Chorus Line		Shubert Theatre.	
Stephen Sondheim Theatre Henry Miller's Theatre (1998–2010) Kit Kat Klub (1998) Club Expo (1994–1997) City (1991–1994) Shout (1985–1991) Xenon (1978–1984) Avon-at-the-Hudson (1972–1978) Park-Miller Theatre (1970–1972) Henry Miller's Theatre (1918–1970)	124 W. 43rd St.	1918	1,055	Roundabout Theatre Company	The Fountain of Youth	Beautiful: The Carole King Musical	& Juliet	Stephen Sondheim Theatre.	
St. James Theatre Erlanger's Theatre (1927–1932)	246 W. 44th St.	1927	1,709	ATG Entertainment	The Merry Malones	Hello, Dolly!		St. James Theatre.	
Studio 54 CBS Studio No. 52 (1946–1977) CBS Radio Playhouse No. 4 (1942–1946) New Yorker Theatre (1939–1942) Federal Music Theatre (1937–1939) Palladium Theatre (1936–1937) Casino de Paris (1933–1936) New Yorker Theatre (1930–1933) Gallo Opera House (1927–1930)	254 W. 54th St.	1927	1,006	Roundabout Theatre Company	La Bohème	Cabaret	The Rocky Horror Show	Studio 54.	
Todd Haimes Theatre American Airlines Theatre (2000–2023) Selwyn Theatre (1918–2000)	227 W. 42nd St.	1918	740	Roundabout Theatre Company	Information Please	The Royal Family	The Imaginary Invalid	Todd Haimes Theatre.	
Vivian Beaumont Theater	150 W. 65th St.	1965	1,080	Lincoln Center Theater	Danton's Death	Contact	A Few Good Men	Vivian Beaumont Theater.	
Walter Kerr Theatre Ritz Theatre (1921–1990) Robert F. Kennedy Children's' Theatre	219 W. 48th St.	1921	945	ATG Entertainment	Mary Stuart / A Man About Town	Hadestown	Hadestown	Walter Kerr Theatre.	
Winter Garden Theatre Cadillac Winter Garden Theatre (2002–2007) Winter Garden Theatre (1911–2002)	1634 Broadway	1911	1,526	Shubert Organization	La Belle Paree / Bow-Sing / Tortajada	Cats	Much Ado About Nothing	Winter Garden Theatre.	

Interactive map

Locations of active Broadway theaters. Each individual theater is represented by a pin which when clicked on shows the name of the theater.

== Existing former Broadway theaters ==
There are eight theaters that once were considered Broadway houses that are still standing but no longer present Broadway theatre performances.

Theater former name(s)	Address	Opened	Last Broadway production	Current use	Owner/operator	Image	Ref.
Edison Theatre The Edison Ballroom (1991–present) The Arena Theatre (1951–91) Edison Theatre (1931–51)	240 W. 47th St.	1931	1991; Those Were the Days	Event space	Hotel Edison	the Edison Ballroom	
Ed Sullivan Theater CBS Studio No. 50 (1950–67) CBS Radio Playhouse No. 1 (1936–50) Manhattan Theatre (1936) Billy Rose's Music Hall (1933–1936) Manhattan Theatre (1931–1933) Hammerstein's Theatre (1927–31)	1697 Broadway	1927	1936; Help Yourself	Television studio	CBS	Ed Sullivan Theater.	
Empire Theatre Laff Movie (1942–54) Eltinge 42nd Street Theatre (1912–42)	236 W. 42nd St.	1912	1931; First Night	Movie theater	AMC Theatres	Empire Theatre.	
Liberty Theatre	234 W. 42nd St.	1904	1933; Masks and Faces	Event space	Liberty Theater Catering & Events	Liberty Theatre.	
New Victory Theater The Victory (1942–1995) Theatre Republic (1910–1942) Belasco Theatre (1902–1910) Theatre Republic (1900–1902)	209 W. 42nd St.	1900	1930; Pressing Business	Off-Broadway; Theatre for Young Audiences	New 42nd Street	New Visctory Theater.	
Sony Hall The Diamond Horseshoe Century Theatre (1978–1982) Mayfair Theatre (1970–1978) Stairway Theatre (1970) Billy Rose's Diamond Horseshoe (1938–1970)	235 W. 46th St.	1938	1982; Waltz of the Stork	Concert venue	Blue Note Entertainment Group	Sony Hall	
Times Square Church Mark Hellinger Theatre (1949–1989) 51st Street Theatre (1940–1949) Hollywood Theatre (1930–1940) Warner Brothers Theatre (1930)	237 W. 51st St.	1930	1989; Legs Diamond	Nondenominational church	Times Square Church	Times Square Church.	
Times Square Theatre	217 W. 42nd St.	1920	1933; Forsaking All Others	vacant	New 42nd Street	Times Square Theatre.	

== Demolished Broadway theaters ==
The definition of "Broadway Theater" was more subjective before the Tony Awards era. Variety, burlesque, minstrelsy halls, vaudeville, opera houses, hippodromes, and theaters all laid claim to the moniker. There are multiple historic moments considered the beginning of Broadway theatre as a style including:

- 1866 – The Black Crook, considered the first piece of American style musical theater, opened at Niblo's Garden.
- 1919 – The newly-formed actors' union, Actors' Equity, went on a month-long strike. This strike gave actors and performers the recognition of a "fully legitimate professional trade", framing this style of theater as not just being an art, but also a full trade with the actors as laborers.
- 1949 – Actors' Equity came to an agreement with smaller theaters in New York to allow union members to perform for a "token salary" alongside non-union members in their houses. This created the current legal division between Broadway and Off-Broadway theaters.

The Internet Broadway Database lists all large venues in the general Theater District or Broadway areas of their time. The following lists organize all 95 demolished venues which hosted legitimate theater and appear on the Database. The theaters are organized into four lists based on when their last theatrical production opened compared to the three moments that may be considered the beginning of Broadway theatre. All theaters are listed by the name in use when their last theatrical production took place.

=== Post-1949 agreement ===
The 1949 Actors' Equity agreement is the largest defining moment in the classification of Broadway theaters. It granted smaller theaters in New York the ability to hire union members to perform, as long as they were paid a "token salary", alongside non-union members in their houses. This new union contract laid out a legal division between Broadway and the newly defined Off-Broadway theaters. The following list notes the 19 theaters that housed Broadway productions after this agreement went into effect and have since been demolished.

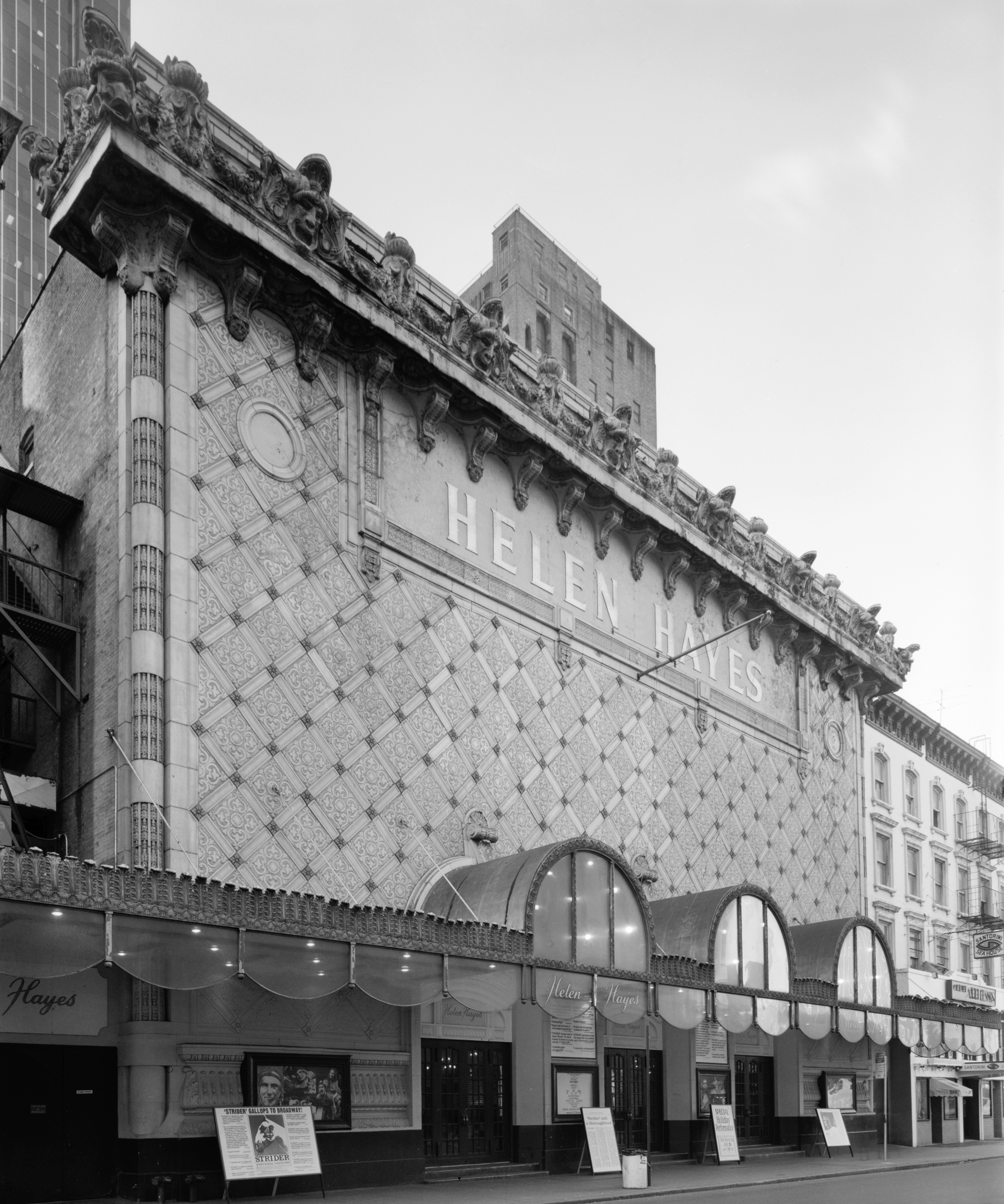
The Helen Hayes Theatre was one of five theaters demolished in 1982 to make room for the New York Marriott Marquis hotel. The other four theaters were the Morosco, Bijou, and the closed Astor and Gaiety.

Theater former name(s)	Opened	Last theatre production	Demolished	Ref.
48th Street Theatre Windsor Theatre (1937–1943) 48th Street Theatre (1912–1937)	1912	1951; Jotham Valley	1955	
Bijou Theatre Bijou Theatre (1965–1982) Toho Cinema (1965) D. W. Griffith Theatre (1962–1965) CBS Studio No. 62 (1951–1962) Bijou Theatre (1917–1951)	1917	1981; Passionate Ladies	1982	
Center Theatre RKO Center (1933–1934) RKO Roxy Theatre (1932–1933)	1932	1950; Howdy, Mr. Ice of 1950	1954	
Central Theatre Club USA (1988–1998) Movieland (1980–1988) Forum 47th Street Theatre (1975–1980) Forum Theatre (1965–1975) Odeon Theatre (1958–1965) Holiday Theatre (1951–1958) Gotham Theatre (1944–1951) Central Theatre (1934–1944) Columbia Theatre (1934) Central Theatre (1918–1934)	1918	1956; Debut	1998	
Empire Theatre	1893	1953; The Time of the Cuckoo	1953	
George Abbott Theatre 54th Street Theatre (1958–1965) Adelphi Theatre (1944–1958) Yiddish Arts Theatre (1943–1944) Radiant Center (1940–1943) Adelphi Theatre (1934–1940) Craig Theatre (1928–1934)	1928	1970; Gantry	1970	
Harkness Theatre RKO Colonial Theatre (1931–1974) Hampden's Theatre (1925–1931) New Colonial Theatre (1917–1925) Keith's Colonial Theatre (1912–1917) Colonial Theatre (1905–1912) Colonial Music Hall (1905)	1905	1977; Ipi Tombi	1977	
Helen Hayes Theatre Folies-Bergere (1911–1955) Fulton Theatre (1911)	1911	1981; I Won't Dance	1982	
International Theatre Columbus Circle (1945) International Theatre (1944–1945) Park Theatre (1935–1944) Theatre of Young America (1934–1935) Cosmopolitan Theatre (1923–1934) Minsky's Park Music Hall (1922–1923) Park Theatre (1911–1922) Majestic Theatre (1903–1911)	1903	1949; The Young and Fair	1954	
Latin Quarter Princess Theatre (1980–1983) 22 Steps (1979–1980) Cine Lido (1963–1979) Latin Quarter (1942–1963) Cotton Club (1936–1942) Ubangi Club (1935–1936) Palais Royal (1900–1935)	1913	1986; Mayor	1989	
Morosco Theatre	1917	1981; The Moony Shapiro Songbook	1982	
New Apollo Theatre Academy Theatre (1983–1996) New Apollo Theatre (1979–1983) Apollo Theatre (1920–1979) Bryant Theatre (1910–1920)	1910	1983; The Guys in the Truck	1996	
New Century Theatre Jolson's 59th Street Theatre (1943–1944) Molly Picon Theatre (1943) Jolson's 59th Street Theatre (1942–1943) Venice Theatre (1934–1942) Shakespeare Theatre (1932–1934) Central Park Theatre (1931–1932) Jolson's 59th Street Theatre (1921–1931)	1921	1954; The Azuma Kabuki Dancers and Musicians	1962	
Playhouse Theatre	1911	1967; The Impossible Years	1969	
President Theatre Mamma Leone's restaurant (1956–1988) Erwin Piscator's Dramatic Workshop (1955–1956) President Theatre (1943–1955) 48th Street Theatre (1938–1943) Show Shop (1938) American Show Shop (1937–1938) Acme Theatre (1937) Artef Theatre (1934–1937) President Theatre (1934) Midget Theatre (1933–1934) Caruso Theatre (1933) Hindenburg Theatre (1932–1933) President Theatre (1929–1932) Edyth Totten Theatre (1926–1929)	1926	1954; Stockade	1988	
Rialto Theatre	1916	1982; Blues in the Night	2002	
Vanderbilt Theatre	1918	1954; Ruth Draper	1954	
Ziegfeld Theatre	1927	1965; Anya	1966	

=== Post-1919 actors' strike ===
The 1919 Actors' Equity Association strike was a turning point for the profession of acting in New York City. Actors' Equity, the union for performers and actors, founded only a few years earlier in 1913, used this month-long strike to cement acting as a "fully legitimate professional trade", where the performers produced labor for a now-official industry, Broadway theatre. The following list notes the 34 theaters that housed Broadway productions after this strike ended but closed before the 1949 Actors' Equity agreement.

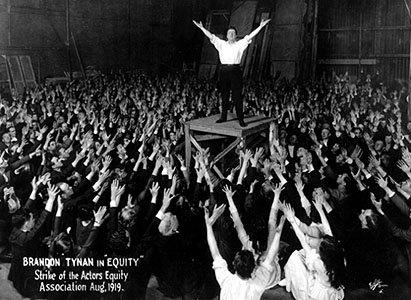
Brandon Tynan during a performance to raise funds for the 1919 Actors' Equity Association strike

Theater former name(s)	Opened	Last theatre production	Demolished	Ref.
39th Street Theatre Nazimova's 39th Street Theatre (1910–1911)	1910	1926; Laff That Off	1926	
44th Street Theatre Weber and Fields' Music Hall (1912–1913)	1912	1945; On the Town	1945	
49th Street Theatre Cinema 49 (1938–1940) 49th Street Theatre (1921–1938)	1921	1938; The Wild Duck	1940	
American Music Hall American Theatre (1893–1908)	1893	1939; The Girl from Wyoming	1932 (Note: Conflicting records. according to IBDB, "Records indicate it was razed in 1932, but it may have hosted productions through the 1930s".)	
Astor Theatre	1906	1925; June Days	1982	
Avon Theatre CBS Radio Playhouse No. 2 (1934–1954) Avon Theatre (1929–1934) Klaw Theatre (1921–1929)	1921	1934; Tight Britches	1954	
Belmont Theatre Theatre Parisien (1919–1920) Belmont Theatre (1918–1919) Norworth Theatre (1918)	1918	1940; Mum's the Word	1951	
Broadway Theatre Metropolitan Concert Hall (1880–1888)	1880	1929; Broadway Fever	1929	
Casino de Paris Century Grove (1911–1926) Century Promenade (1909–1911) Cocoanut Grove Theatre (1909)	1909	1928; The Optimists	1930	
Casino Theatre	1882	1930; Faust	1930	
Casino Theatre Casa Manana (1936–1939) French Casino Theatre (1933–1936) Casino Theatre (1932–1933) Earl Carroll Theatre (1922–1932)	1922	1933; Melody	1990	
Century Theatre Century Opera House (1913–1915) Century Theatre (1911–1913) New Theatre (1909–1911) Millionaires' Theatre (1909)	1909	1926; The Student Prince	1930	
Charles Hopkins Theatre Embassy 49th Street Theatre (1982–1987) World Theatre (1935–1982) Westminster Cinema (1934–1935) Charles Hopkins Theatre (1926–1934) Punch and Judy Theatre (1914–1926)	1914	1932; Housewarming	1987	
Civic Repertory Theatre Haverly's 14th Street Theatre (1880–1926) 14th Street Theatre (1867–1880) Theatre Français (1866–1867)	1866	1936; Bitter Stream	1938	
Concert Theatre Elysee Theatre (1948–1985) Cort's 58th Street Theatre (1946–1948) Rock Church (1943–1946) Concert Theatre (1942–1943) Fine Arts (1938–1942) Filmarte Theatre (1936–1938) Cort's 58th Street Theatre (1935–1936) John Golden Theatre (1926–1935)	1926	1942; Of V We Sing	1985	
Criterion Theatre Vitagraph Theatre (1914–1916) Criterion Theatre (1899–1914) Olympia Theatre: Lyric (1895–1899)	1895	1920; The Letter of the Law	1935	
Daly's 63rd Street Theatre Experimental Theatre (1936–1938) Gilmore's 63rd Street Theatre (1934–1936) Park Lane Theatre (1932–1934) Recital Theatre (1932) Coburn Theatre (1928–1932) Daly's 63rd Street Theatre (1922–1928) 63rd Street Music Hall (1921–1922) Cort's 63rd Street Theatre (1921) 63rd Street Music Hall (1914–1921)	1914	1941; Ghost for Sale	1957	
Fay's Bowery Theatre Thalia Theatre (1879–1929) Bowery Theatre (1828–1879) New York Theatre (1826–1828)	1826	1929; Under the Gaslight	1929	
Fifth Avenue Theatre New Fifth Avenue Theatre (1873–1877) St. James Theatre (1870–1873) Gilsey's Apollo Hall (1868–1870)	1868	1935; Bertha, the Sewing Machine Girl	1939	
Gaiety Theatre Embassy Five Theatre (1978–1982) Victoria Theatre (1943–1978) Gaiety Theatre (1908–1943)	1908	1932; Collision	1982	
Garrick Theatre Theatre du Vieux Columbier (1917–1919) Garrick Theatre (1895–1917) Harrigan's Theatre (1890–1895)	1890	1930; Winter Bound	1932	
George M. Cohan's Theatre	1911	1933; The Dubarry	1938	
Hippodrome Theatre	1905	1936; Jumbo	1939	
Jardin de Paris New York Roof (1905–1907) Cherry Blossom Grove (1900–1905) Winter Garden Theatre (1895–1900) Olympia Theatre: Roof Garden (1895)	1895	1911; Ziegfeld Follies of 1911	1935	
Knickerbocker Theatre Abbey's Theatre (1893–1896)	1893	1929; Sweet Land of Liberty	1930	
Lyric Theatre	1903	1934; Gypsy Blonde	1934	
Maxine Elliott's Theatre CBS Studio No. 51 (1949–1960) CBS Radio Playhouse No. 5 (1944–1949) WOR Mutual Radio (1941–1944) Maxine Elliott's Theatre (1908–1941)	1908	1948; Ballet Ballads	1960	
Mercury Theatre Artef Theatre (1940–1942) Mercury Theatre (1937–1940) Comedy Theatre (1913–1937) Collier's Comedy Theatre (1910–1913) Comedy Theatre (1909–1910)	1909	1939; Tell My Story	1942	
Nora Bayes Theatre Lew Fields' 44th Street Roof Garden (1913–1918)	1913	1939; First American Dictator	1945	
Princess Theatre Cinema Verdi (1952–1955) Little Met (1948–1952) Cinema Dante (1947–1948) Princess Theatre (1944–1947) Labor Stage Theatre (1937–1944) Reo Cinema (1930–1937) Assembly Theatre (1929–1930) Princess Theatre (1929) Lucille La Verne Theatre (1928–1929) Princess Theatre (1913–1928)	1913	1947; Virginia Reel	1955	
Sam H. Harris Theatre Cohan and Harris (1916–1921) Candler Theatre (1914–1916)	1914	1933; Pigeons and People	1996	
Waldorf Theatre	1926	1933; Dangerous Corner	1968	
Wallack's Theatre Wallack's Theatre (1924–1940) Frazee Theatre (1920–1924) Harris Theatre (1911–1920) Hackett Theatre (1906–1911) Lew M. Fields Theatre (1904–1906)	1904	1930; Find the Fox	1997	

=== Post-1866 Black Crook production ===
In 1866 The Black Crook opened at Niblo's Garden, a theater on Broadway, near Prince Street. While there are strong arguments against it, this piece is considered the first piece of American-style musical theater. Whether or not it is truly the first musical, The Black Crook marks a turning point where Broadway became less about the variety, burlesque, and minstrel shows of the past, and began to be known more for the large-scale book musical which still reigns today.

The following list notes the 30 theaters that housed Broadway productions after The Black Crook opened but closed before the 1919 Actors' Equity strike.

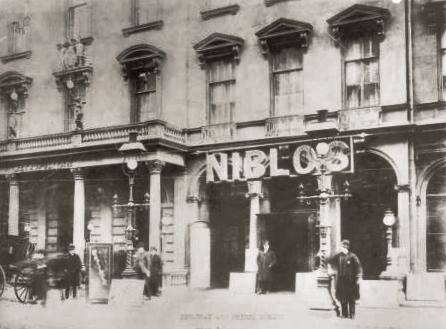
The exterior of Niblo's Garden, where The Black Crook opened in 1866

Theater former name(s)	Opened	Last theatre production	Demolished	Ref.
Abbey's Park Theatre New Park Theatre (1874–1876)	1847	1882; Divorçons	1882	
Academy of Music	1854	1912; The Girl from Brighton	1926	
Bandbox Theatre Adolf Philipp's Fifty-Seventh Street Theatre (1912–1914)	1912	1917; Nju	1969	
Barnum's New American Museum Buckley's Opera House (1953–1965) Chinese Rooms (1950–1953)	1850	1866; Jack and Gill Went Up the Hill	1868	
Bijou Theatre Brighton Theatre (1878–1881)	1878	1912; The Truth Wagon	1915	
Broadway Theatre Wallack's Lyceum Theatre (1852–1861) Brougham's Lyceum Theatre (1850–1852)	1850	1868; A Flash of Lightning	1869	
Circle Theatre	1901	1910; The Chocolate Soldier	1954	
Daly's Theatre Broadway Theatre (1876–1879) Wood's Museum and Metropolitan (1868–1876) Banvard's Museum (1867–1868)	1867	1912; The Drone	1920	
Garden Theatre Madison Square Garden (1880–1890) Gilmore's Garden (1870?–1880)	1870?	1917; Three Plays for a Negro Theater	1925	
Grand Opera House Pike's Opera House (1868–1869)	1868	1915; Jack's Romance	1960	
Herald Square Theatre New Park Theatre (1883–1894)	1883	1908; The Worth of a Woman	1915	
Hoyt's Theatre Madison Square Theatre (1879–1891) Daly's Fifth Avenue Theatre (1869–1879) Brougham's Theatre (1868–1869) Fifth Avenue Opera House (1865–1868)	1865	1912; Everywoman	1908	
Koster and Bial's Music Hall Bon Ton (1920–1924) Koster and Bial's Music Hall (1879–1920) Bryant's Opera House (1870–1879)	1870	1901; Nell Gwynne	1924	
Lyceum Theatre	1885	1902; The Girl and the Judge	1902	
Madison Square Roof Garden	1890	1908; Ski-Hi	1925	
Manhattan Theatre Standard Theatre (1878–1897) Eagle Variety (1875–1878)	1875	1907; The Mills of the Gods	1909	
New Bowery Theatre	1859	1867; Little Boy Blue	1866	
New Theatre Comique Globe Theatre (1870–1881) Worrell Sisters' New York Theatre (1867–1870) New York Theatre (1866–1867) Lucy Rushton's New York Theatre (1865–1866) Athenaeum (1865)	1865	1868; Pickwick Papers	1884	
Olympia Theatre Loew's New York (1915–1935) New York Theatre (1913–1915) Moulin Rouge (1912–1913) New York Theatre (1899–1912) Olympia Theatre: Music Hall (1895–1899)	1895	1914; The Traffic	1935	
Niblo's Garden	1829	1894; A Tale of Corsica	1895	
Olympic Theatre Laura Keene's Theatre (1856–1863)	1856	1879; Assommoir	1880	
Paradise Roof Garden Venetian Terrace Roof Garden (1899–1900)	1899	1903; Punch, Judy & Company	1935	
Princess Theatre Hermann's Gaiety Theatre (1890–1902) San Francisco Music Hall (1875–1890) Jack's Theatre Theatre Comique Jonah Theatre	1875	1907; A Doll's House	1907	
Savoy Theatre Schley Music Hall (1900)	1900	1910; Children of Destiny	1933	
Star Theatre Wallack's Theatre (1861–1880)	1861	1901; The Convict's Daughter	1901	
Theatre Comique Wood's Minstrel Hall (1862–1869)	1862	1872; Ixion	1872	
Victoria Theatre Rialto Theatre (1916–1935) Victoria Theatre (1899–1916)	1899	1904; Lew Dockstader's Minstrels	1915	
Wallack's Theatre Palmer's Theatre (1888–1895) Wallack's Theatre (1882–1888)	1882	1915; The Doctor's Dilemma	1915	
Weber's Music Hall Weber and Fields' Broadway Music Hall (1896–1906) Imperial Music Hall (1892–1896)	1892	1913; Alibi Bill	1917	
Winter Garden Theatre Burton's New Theatre (1856–1859) Laura Keene's Variety House (1854–1856) Metropolitan Hall (1851–1854) Jenny Lind Hall (1850–1851) Tripler Hall (1850)	1850	1867; The Merchant of Venice	1867	
Windsor Theatre German Winter Garden (1855–1864) New Stadt Theatre (1864–1878) Windsor Theatre (1878–1910)	1855		1910	

=== Pre-musical ===
The following list notes the 12 theaters that housed Broadway productions from the beginning of theater in New York City but closed before the opening of The Black Crook.

Before the advent of the musical there were multiple theaters in New York that claimed the moniker of "Broadway", including an 1847 theater named the Broadway Theatre. While most early theaters were short-lived and housed touring productions from Europe, that changed with the construction of the Park Theatre in 1798. These newly constructed, long-term theaters grew in number through the nineteenth century, clustered around Broadway, and began hosting a wide array of ethnic and new forms of entertainment.

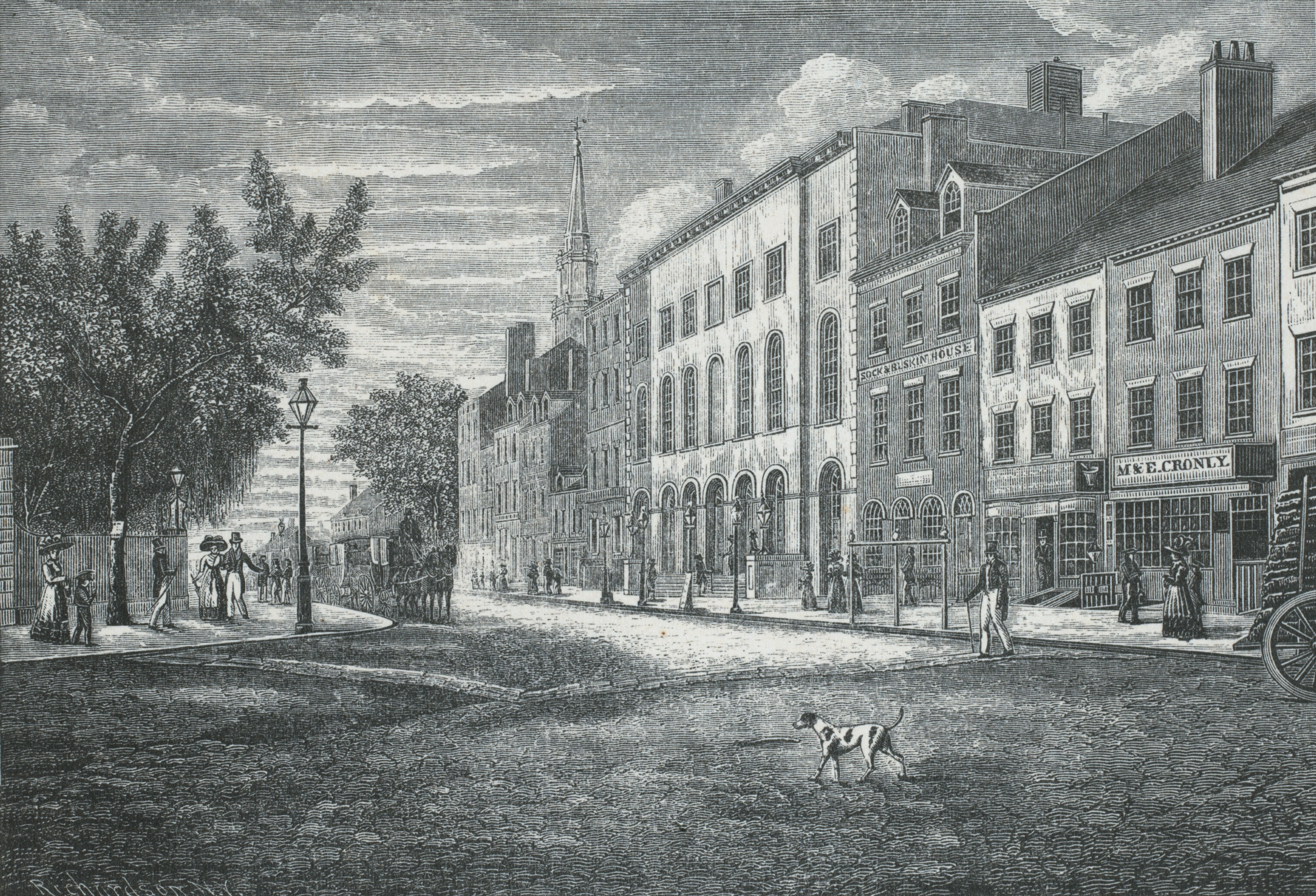
The Park Theatre and surrounding neighborhood c. 1830

Theater former name(s)	Opened	Last theatre production	Demolished	Ref.
American Theatre Broadway Boudoir (1860–1864) Fellow's Opera House (1854–1860)	1854	1864; The House That Jack Built	1866	
Anthony Street Theatre Pavilion Theatre (1816–1820) Olympic Theatre (1814–1816)	1800	1820; Virginius	1821	
Barnum's American Museum	1841	1865; The Green Monster	1865	
Booth's Theatre	1869	1838; The Outlaw	1965	
Broadway Theatre	1847	1856; King Charming	1859	
Burton's Chambers Street Theatre Ferdinand Palmo's Opera House (1844–1848)	1844	1860; The Romance of a Poor Young Man	1876	
John Street Theatre Theatre Royal (1775–1777) John Street Theatre (1767–1775)	1767	1796; Edwin and Angelina	1797	
Nassau Street Theatre Van Dam Theatre (1750) New Theatre (1732–1750)	1732	1754; King Lear	1758	
National Theatre Italian Opera House (1833–1839)	1833	1853; Uncle Tom's Cabin	1841	
Olympic Theatre	1837	1848; A Glance at New York In 1848	1854	
Park Theatre New Theatre (1798–1799)	1798	1848; Met-A-Mora	1848	
Richmond Hill Theatre New York Opera House (1834–1849) Italian Opera House (1832–1834) Richmond Hill Theatre (1831–1832)	1831	1832; The Hunchback	1849	

== See also ==
- List of West End theatres
