= Embassy Five Theatre =

Former theatre in Manhattan, New York

Coordinates: 40.758544°N 73.985406°W

- Embassy 5, Victoria Theatre, Gaiety Theatre
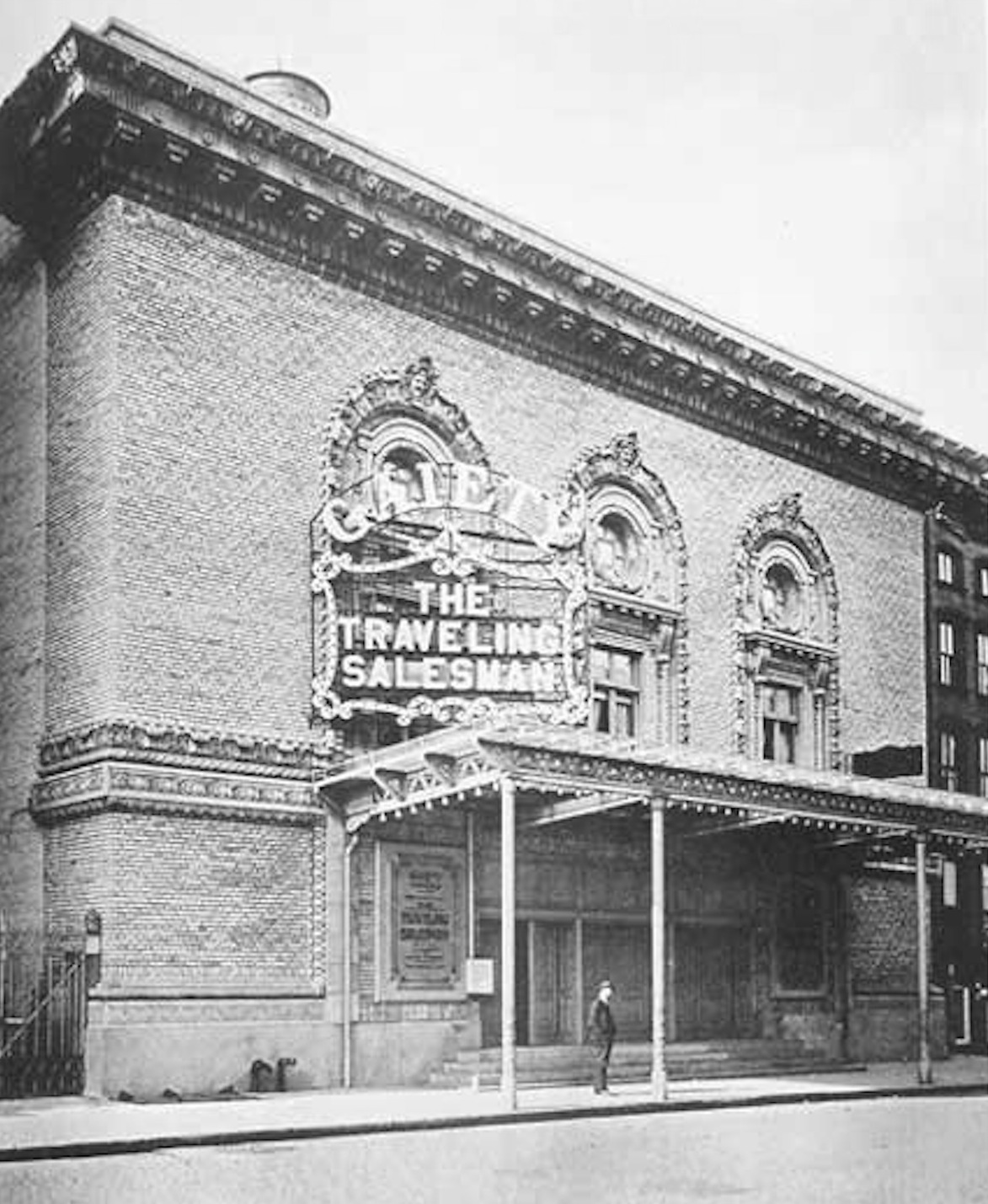
- Interactive map of Embassy Five Theatre
- Address: 1547 Broadway; New York City; United States
- Type: Broadway

Construction
- Opened: 1909
- Demolished: 1982

The Embassy Five Theatre was a Broadway theatre at 1547 Broadway in Times Square, Manhattan, New York City from 1909 until 1982, when it was torn down. It was originally known as the Gaiety Theatre, becoming the Victoria Theatre in 1943; the theater was known as the Embassy Five Theatre for the last two years of its existence.

The office building that housed the theatre, the Gaiety Building, has been called the Black Tin Pan Alley for the number of African-American songwriters who rented office space there.

It was designed by Herts & Tallant and owned by Klaw and Erlanger with George M. Cohan and his partner Sam Harris as co-managers. The theatre introduced revolutionary concepts of a sunken orchestra (the previous configuration had the orchestra on the same level as the seats in front of the stage) and also not having pillars obstructing sight lines for the balcony.

== History ==
The Gaiety Theatre opened on September 4, 1909 with the Fortune Hunter. In 1914 the theatre had a hit production with Jean Webster's Daddy-Long-Legs; a show which made Ruth Chatterton a star. Its biggest hit during its early years was Lightnin' which played for 1,291 performances starting August 16, 1918.

=== Minsky's ===
After 1933, the theatre became a Minsky's Burlesque. One of the top venues in the circuit, it featured performances by Ann Corio and Gypsy Rose Lee, as well as comedy acts such as Abbott and Costello.

=== Victoria ===
In 1943, Mayor Fiorello LaGuardia cracked down on burlesque, and the theatre became the Victoria, which initially featured vaudeville performances including Stepin Fetchit. It was transformed into a movie theatre in September 1943. In 1944 United Artists leased the theatre for movies and in 1949 Edward Durrell Stone designed a renovation of the interior which was expanded to 1,050 seats.

A sign on the roof of the theatre went across the neighboring Astor Theatre and was said to be the largest in the world. While originally advertising movies, it would later be best remembered as an advertisement for Budweiser.

=== Embassy Five ===
In 1980, the theatre was renamed the Embassy Five (Embassy 5), as the fifth theatre owned by the Embassy chain in the Times Square area. In 1982 it was one of five theatres (along with the original Helen Hayes, Morosco, Bijou, and Astor theaters) torn down to make way for the New York Marriott Marquis Hotel.

== Black Tin Pan Alley ==
The office building above the theatre was popular among black composers who were not allowed in the Brill Building. Among them were Harry Pace, W.C. Handy, Clarence Williams, Perry Bradford, Bert Williams, and Will Vodery. Andy Razaf would pick up his mail there.

== See also ==
- List of Broadway theaters § Demolished Broadway theaters
