= Morosco Theatre =

Broadway theater (1917–1982)

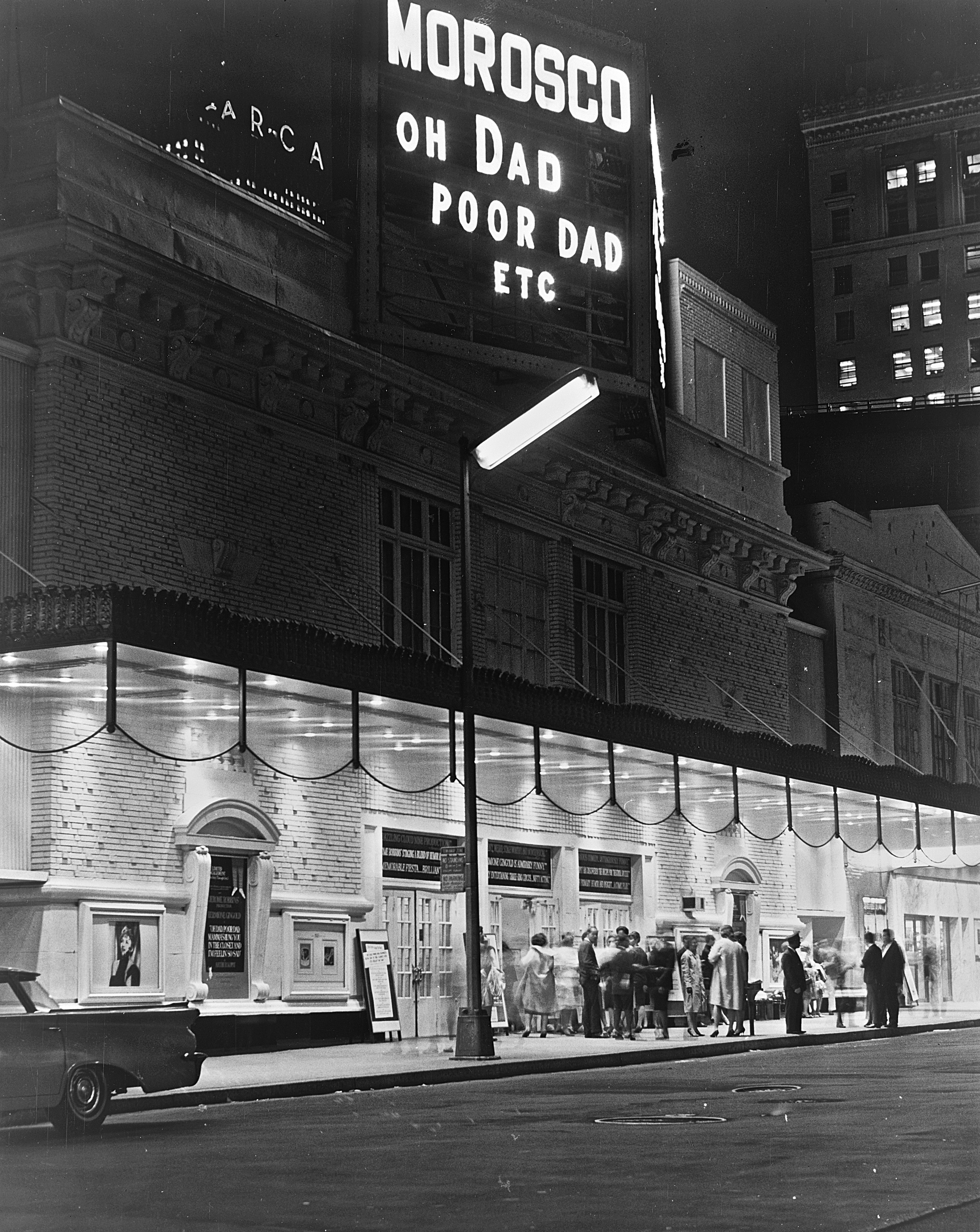
- Morosco Theatre in 1963, when it was hosting Arthur Kopit's comedy Oh Dad, Poor Dad, Mamma's Hung You in the Closet and I'm Feelin' So Sad
- Interactive map of Morosco Theatre
- Address: 217 West 45th Street; New York City; United States
- Coordinates: 40.75801°N 73.98567°W
- Type: Broadway

Construction
- Opened: February 5, 1917
- Demolished: 1982
- Architect: Herbert J. Krapp

The Morosco Theatre was a Broadway theatre near Times Square in New York City from 1917 to 1982. It housed many notable productions and its demolition, along with four adjacent theaters, was controversial.

== History ==
Located at 217 West 45th Street, the Morosco Theatre (MT) was designed by architect Herbert J. Krapp for the Shubert family, who constructed it for Oliver Morosco in gratitude for his helping them break the monopoly of the Theatrical Syndicate. It had approximately 955 seats. After an invitation-only preview performance on February 4, 1917, it opened to the public the next day with a production of Canary Cottage, a musical with a book by Morosco and a score by Earl Carroll. In 1920 Eugene O'Neill's first full-length drama created for the New York stage, Beyond the Horizon, premiered at the MT. It won the Pulitzer Prize for Drama.

The Shuberts lost the building in the Great Depression, and City Playhouses, Inc. bought it at auction in 1943. It was sold in 1968 to Bankers Trust Company and, after a massive "Save the Theatres" protest movement led by Joe Papp and supported by various actors and other theatrical folk failed, it was razed in 1982, along with the first Helen Hayes, the Bijou, and remnants of the Astor and the Gaiety theaters; it was replaced by the 49-story Marriott Marquis hotel and Marquis Theatre.

== Notable productions ==
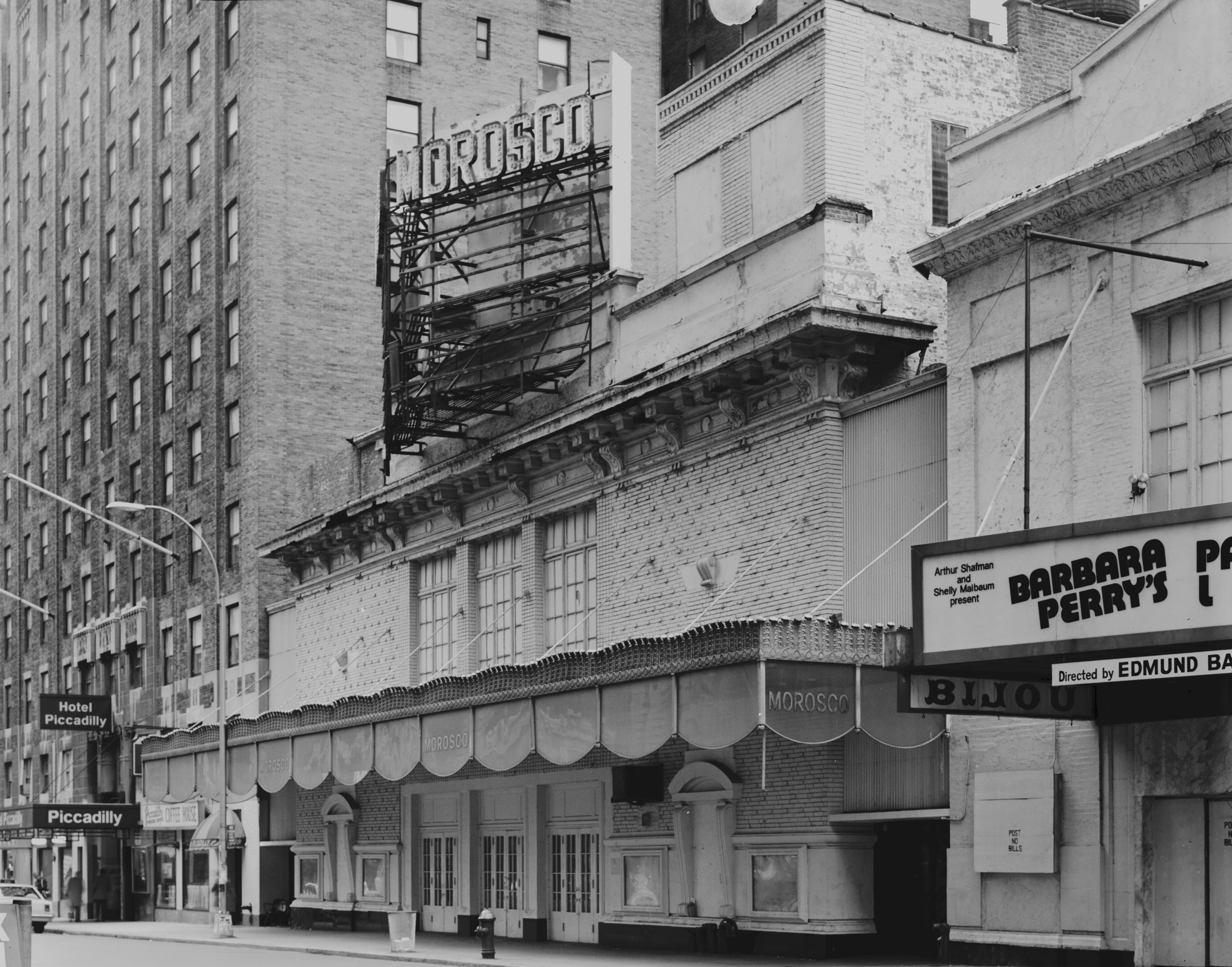
1981

Productions presented at the Morosco Theatre are recorded at the Internet Broadway Database.

- The Bat by Mary Roberts Rinehart and Avery Hopwood, 1920
- Beyond the Horizon by Eugene O'Neill, 1920
- Scaramouche by Rafael Sabatini, 1923
- Craig's Wife by George Kelly, 1925
- The Letter by W. Somerset Maugham, 1927
- Little Accident by Floyd Dell and Thomas Mitchell 1928
- Young Sinners by Elmer Blaney Harris, 1929
- Uncle Vanya by Anton Chekhov, 1929
- Camille by Alexandre Dumas, fils, 1932
- Gold Eagle Guy by Melvin Levy, 1934
- Call It a Day by Dodie Smith, 1936
- A Doll's House by Henrik Ibsen, 1937
- Spring Meeting by Molly Keane, writing as M.J. Farrell, 1938
- Our Town by Thornton Wilder, 1938
- Old Acquaintance by John Van Druten, 1940
- Blithe Spirit a farce by Noël Coward, with Clifton Webb, 1941
- The Morning Star by Emlyn Williams, 1942
- The Voice of the Turtle by John William Van Druten, 1943
- Death of a Salesman by Arthur Miller, 1949
- The Deep Blue Sea by Terence Rattigan, 1952
- Cat on a Hot Tin Roof by Tennessee Williams, 1955
- Major Barbara by George Bernard Shaw, 1956
- Time Remembered by Jean Anouilh, 1957 – 1958
- The Visit by Friedrich Dürrenmatt, 1958
- The Best Man by Gore Vidal, 1960
- The Milk Train Doesn't Stop Here Anymore by Tennessee Williams, 1963
- Three Sisters by Anton Chekhov, 1964
- Alfie! by Bill Naughton, 1964
- Mary, Mary by Jean Kerr, 1964
- Don't Drink the Water by Woody Allen, 1966
- The Price by Arthur Miller, 1968
- Forty Carats by Jay Allen, 1968
- And Miss Reardon Drinks a Little by Paul Zindel, 1971
- Butley by Simon Gray, 1972
- The Changing Room by David Storey, 1973
- A Moon for the Misbegotten by Eugene O'Neill, 1973
- In Praise of Love by Terence Rattigan, 1974
- The Norman Conquests by Alan Ayckbourn, 1975
- The Eccentricities of a Nightingale by Tennessee Williams, 1976
- Let My People Come by Earl Wilson Jr., 1976
- The Innocents by William Archibald, 1976
- A Party with Betty Comden and Adolph Green, a musical revue, 1977
- The Shadow Box by Michael Cristofer, 1977
- Golda by William Gibson, 1977
- Side By Side By Sondheim, a musical revue, 1978
- Da by Hugh Leonard, 1978
- The Lady From Dubuque by Edward Albee, 1980
- Happy New Year, a musical adaptation of the Philip Barry play Holiday with songs by Cole Porter, 1980
- Billy Bishop Goes to War, musical about a Canadian air ace. Written and composed by John MacLachlan Gray in collaboration with Eric Peterson. Opened May 29, 1980. The Morosco's final show.

== See also ==
- List of Broadway theaters § Demolished Broadway theaters
