= Astor Theatre (New York City) =

Former theatre in Manhattan, New York

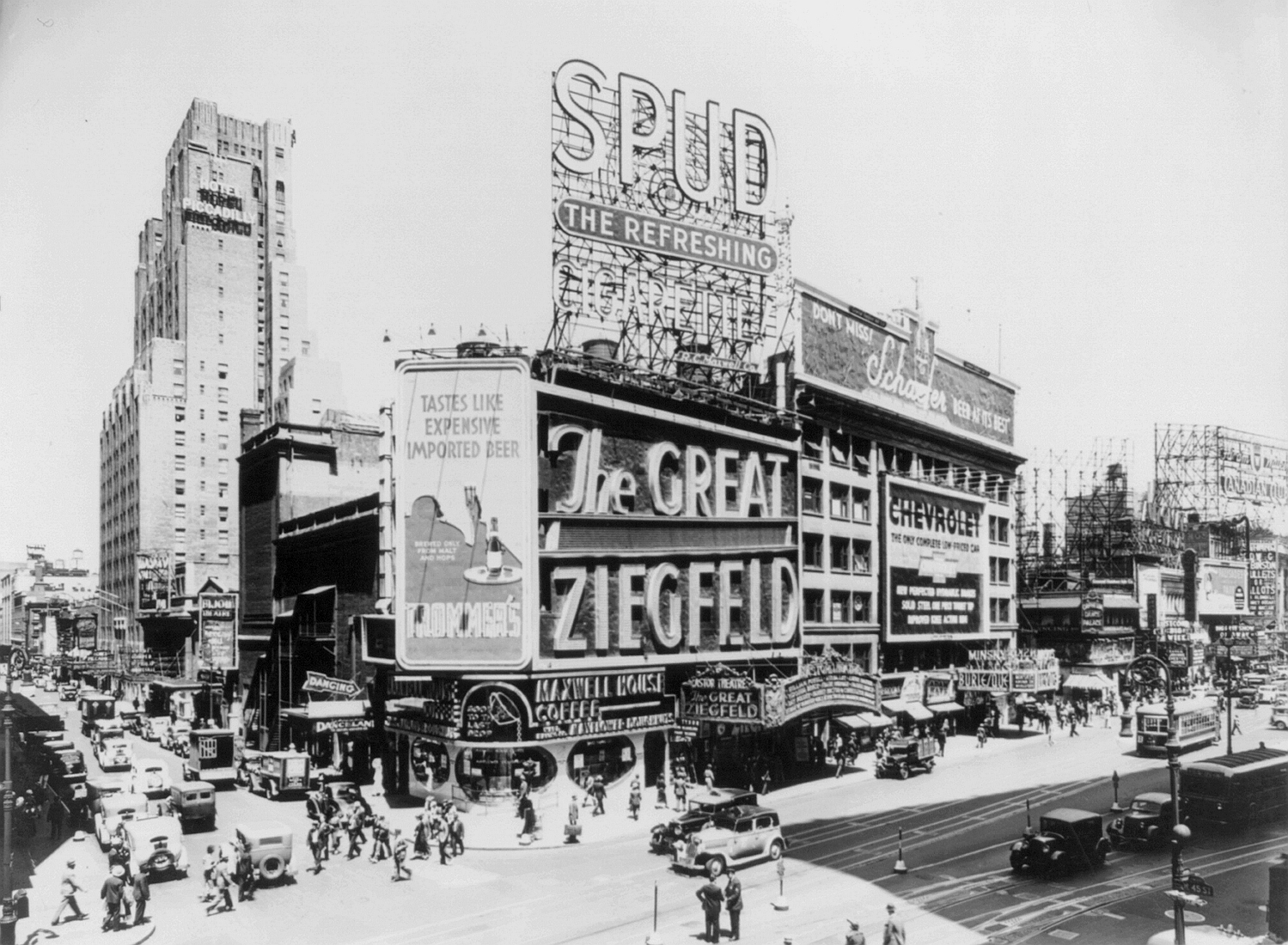
- The Astor Theatre in 1936
- Interactive map of Astor Theatre
- Address: 1537 Broadway; Manhattan, New York; United States
- Coordinates: 40°45′30″N 73°59′09″W
- Type: Broadway

Construction
- Opened: September 21, 1906
- Closed: 1972
- Demolished: 1982
- Years active: 1906–1925 (live theater); 1925–1972 (movie theater)
- Architect: George Keister

The Astor Theatre was located at 1537 Broadway, at the corner with 45th Street, on Times Square in Midtown Manhattan, New York City. It opened in 1906 and continued to operate as a Broadway theatre until 1925. The venue then operated as a movie theater, showing first runs of films, until closing in 1972. It was demolished in 1982 to make room for the Marriott Marquis.

== History ==
The Astor was first managed by Lincoln A. Wagenhals and Collin Kemper, then by George M. Cohan and Sam Harris, and later by the Shubert Organization. The theater was designed by architect George W. Keister.

The Astor Theatre opened on September 21, 1906, with Shakespeare's A Midsummer Night's Dream. Among the plays that debuted at the Astor were Cohan's Seven Keys to Baldpate (1913) and Why Marry? (1917) by Jesse Lynch Williams, the first winner of the Pulitzer Prize for Drama.

In 1925, Loew's Theatres bought the Astor and converted it into a movie house in order to have a Times Square "road show" showcase for first-run films from the MGM film studio. The Big Parade (1925) was the first film shown at the Astor where it ran for a continuous 96-week engagement. Other films to make their Times Square debuts at the Astor include The Phantom of the Opera (1925), The Broadway Melody (1929), Grand Hotel (1932), The Great Ziegfeld (1936) and Gone With the Wind (1939) for MGM; Alfred Hitchcock's Spellbound (1945) and the Beatles in A Hard Day's Night (1964) for United Artists; and Walt Disney's 20,000 Leagues Under the Sea (1954).

The Astor Theatre closed on May 30, 1972, citing maintenance issues with the air conditioning. Though it was scheduled for demolition soon after, plans were delayed after preservation organizations and activists fought to keep the theater standing. During this time, the Astor's lobby was used for retail space. In 1982, it was finally demolished alongside four other theaters – the Victoria Theatre, the first Helen Hayes Theatre, the Bijou Theatre, and the Morosco Theatre – to make way for the Marriott Marquis Hotel and its associated theater.

== See also ==
- List of Broadway theaters § Demolished Broadway theaters
