= New York Marriott Marquis =

Hotel in Manhattan, New York

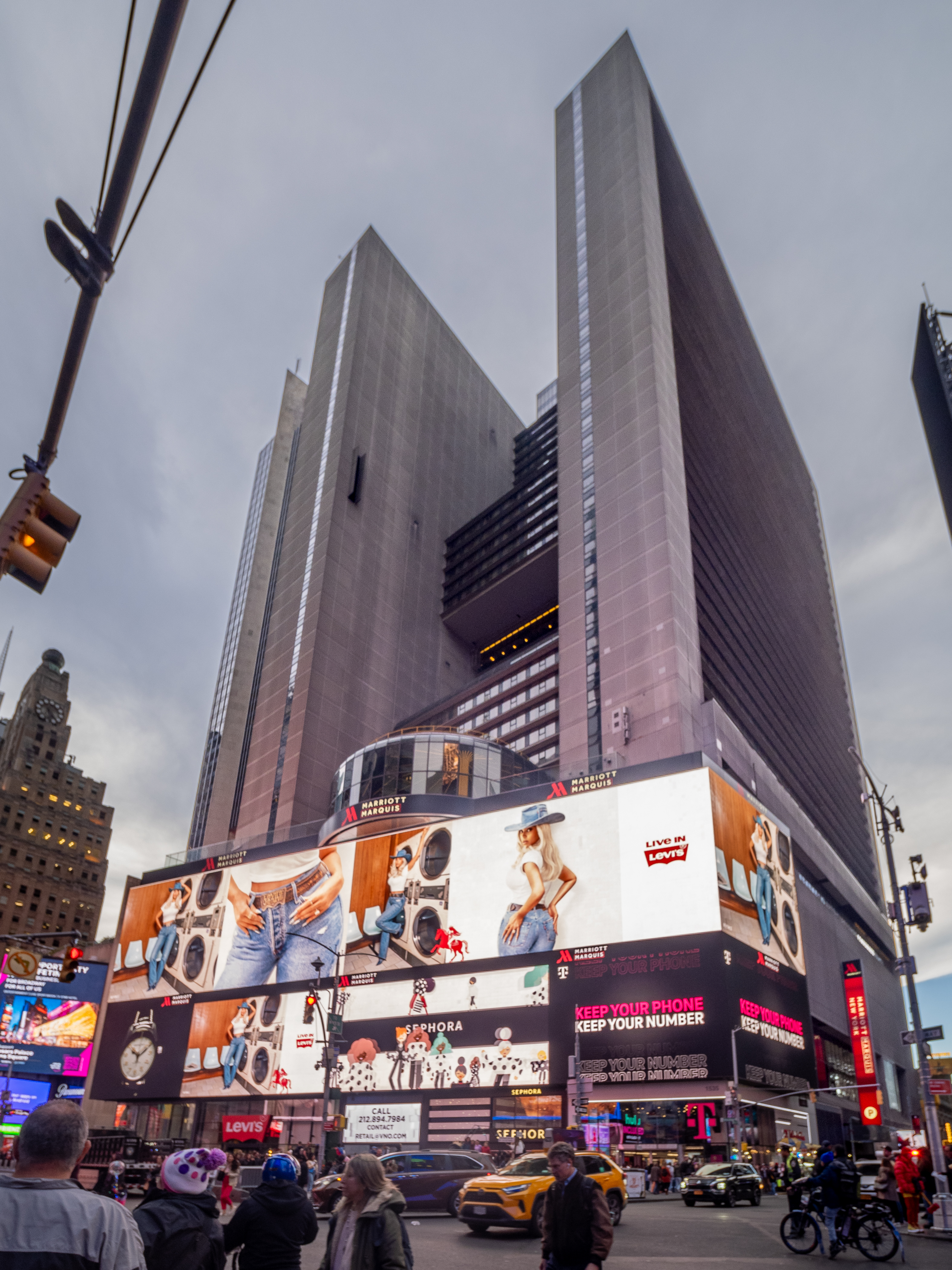
- Seen in 2024
- Interactive map of the New York Marriott Marquis area
- Hotel chain: Marriott Hotels & Resorts

General information
- Architectural style: Brutalist
- Location: Manhattan, New York City, New York, U.S., 1535 Broadway
- Coordinates: 40°45′31″N 73°59′10″W
- Opening: September 3, 1985
- Cost: US$350 million
- Owner: Host Hotels & Resorts
- Operator: Marriott International

Height
- Height: 574 ft (175 m)

Technical details
- Floor count: 51 (+2 basement)
- Floor area: 1,844,800 sq ft (171,390 m^{2})
- Lifts/elevators: 16 (passenger), 6 (service)

Design and construction
- Architect: John Portman & Associates

Other information
- Number of rooms: 1,971
- Number of suites: 57
- Number of restaurants: 3

Website
- Official website

The New York Marriott Marquis is a Marriott hotel on Times Square, in the Theater District of Midtown Manhattan in New York City, New York, U.S. Designed by architect John C. Portman Jr., the hotel is at 1535 Broadway, between 45th and 46th Streets. It has 1,971 rooms and 101,000 sq ft (9,400 m^{2}) of meeting space.

The hotel has two wings, one on 45th Street and one on 46th Street, connected by a podium at ground level. The first two stories contain retail space, while the Marquis Theatre occupies the building's third story. The hotel's atrium lobby, including meeting space and restaurants, is located on the eighth level. Thirty-six stories of guestrooms rise above the lobby, overlooking it. The top three stories contain The View, one of New York City's highest restaurants, which revolves for a 360° view of the city. The hotel architecture features a freestanding concrete elevator core, with twelve glass elevator cabs on its exterior.

Construction began in 1982, following significant delays and extensive controversy concerning the destruction of historic theaters on the site. The hotel opened September 3, 1985, and has since undergone several renovations and modifications. By the late 1990s, the hotel was one of the most profitable in the Marriott chain. After securing all ownership stakes in 1993, Marriott acquired the underlying site in 2013.

== Site ==
The New York Marriott Marquis is on the west side of Broadway, along Times Square between 45th Street (George Abbott Way) to the south and 46th Street to the north, in the Midtown Manhattan neighborhood of New York City, New York, U.S. The New York City Department of City Planning gives the address as 1535 Broadway. The land lot is irregularly shaped and covers 74,287 square feet (6,901.5 m^{2}), with a frontage of 207.94 feet (63.38 m) on Broadway and a depth of 433.94 feet (132.26 m). The Broadway frontage runs diagonally to the 45th and 46th Street frontages. The northern end of the hotel faces Duffy Square.

The sidewalk in front of Broadway was slightly widened when the hotel was built in the 1980s. The widened sidewalk was known as Broadway Plaza. As originally proposed, it would have been a pedestrian mall extending across the roadbed of Broadway eastward to Seventh Avenue. M. Paul Friedberg had designed a plaza with benches and barriers, but the plan was ultimately scrapped. In the 2010s, the sidewalk was further widened, and the adjoining roadbed was converted into a permanent pedestrian plaza with benches. The expanded plaza measures 95 feet (29 m) long and extends the curb line eastward to Seventh Avenue.

The surrounding area is part of Manhattan's Theater District and contains many Broadway theaters. On the same block are the Richard Rodgers Theatre, Music Box Theatre, and Imperial Theatre to the west. Other nearby buildings include the Paramount Hotel to the northwest; the Hotel Edison and Lunt-Fontanne Theatre to the north; TSX Broadway, the Palace and Embassy, theaters, and the I. Miller Building to the northeast; 1540 Broadway to the east; 1530 Broadway to the southeast; One Astor Plaza to the south; and the Booth, Gerald Schoenfeld, Bernard B. Jacobs, and John Golden theaters to the southwest. Historically, the Marriott's site was occupied by five theaters: the original Helen Hayes, (Note: The historical Helen Hayes Theatre on the Marriott Marquis site was distinct from the current Helen Hayes Theatre (formerly the Little Theatre) on 44th Street.) Morosco, Bijou, Astor, and Gaiety (later Victoria), all built in the early 20th century.

== Architecture ==
The New York Marriott Marquis was designed by John C. Portman Jr. and is operated by Marriott International. It is part of the Marriott Marquis brand of hotels, a joint venture between Marriott and Portman. The hotel building has 51 stories and two basements, rising to a height of 574 feet (175 m). While there had been rumors that the elevators serve a 55th floor, Marriott states that the top floor number in the hotel is 49, which is used as office space. According to Host Hotels & Resorts, the hotel's owner, the hotel has 1,966 rooms and 101,000 square feet (9,400 m^{2}) of meeting space. (Note: The hotel is also variously cited as having 1,919, 1,944, or 1,957 guest rooms.)

=== Form and façade ===
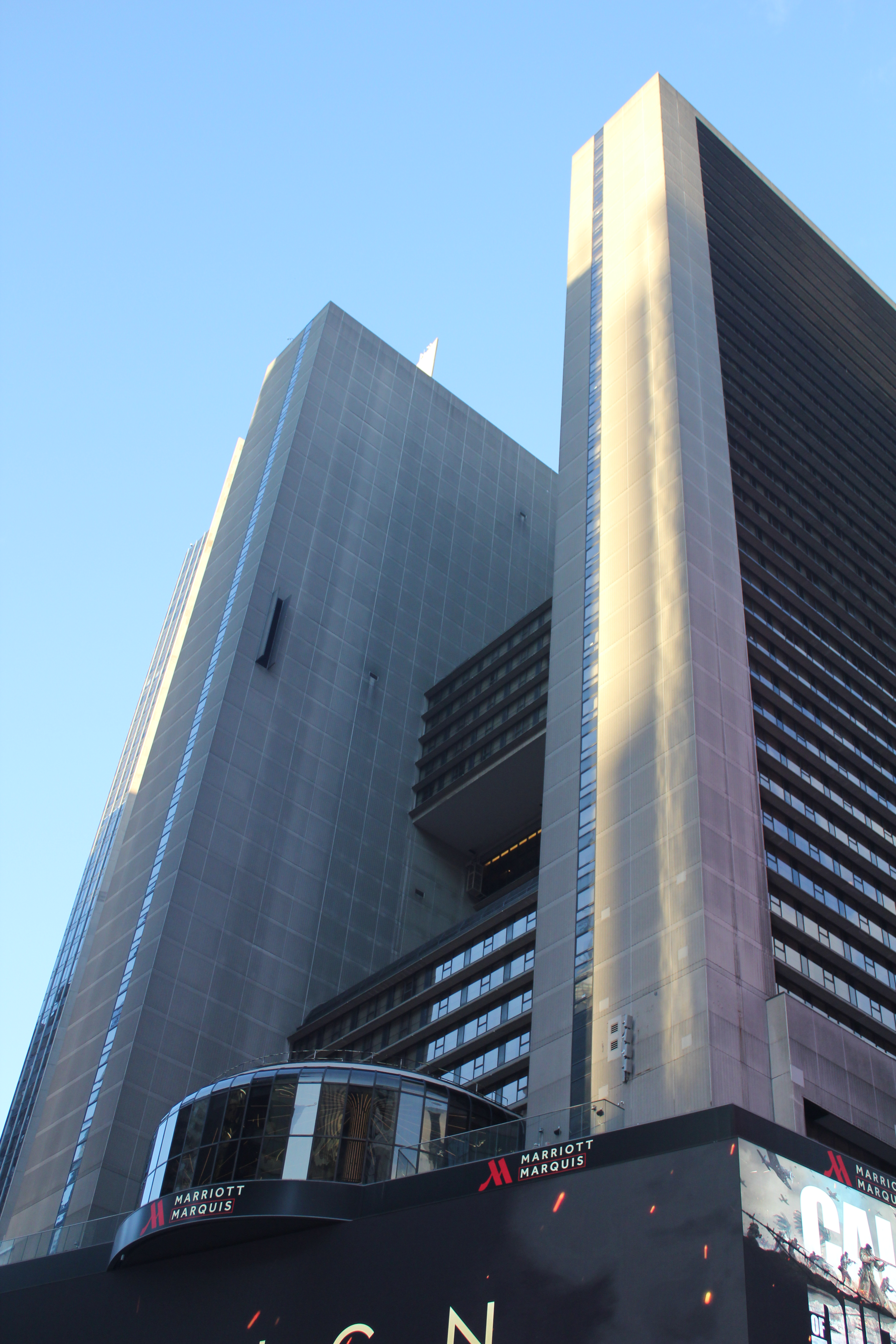
View of the two wings from Broadway

The 1973 plans for the hotel called for two rectangular wings, one on 45th Street and one on 46th Street, connected by a twelve-story podium. Five-story sections of guest rooms were to be recessed between these wings, with each section alternating in depth. The modern hotel is similar to what was originally planned, but the podium is eight stories tall. Above the base of the hotel, in the middle of the Broadway façade, a curving drum sits atop the Marriott marquee. The rectangular wings on 45th and 46th Street contain open terraces on the eighth story, which face Times Square and Broadway. The wings are each 36 feet (11 m) deep and are connected by a truss measuring 112 feet (34 m) long.

The façade is made of gray precast concrete panels with vertical stripes, which were manufactured by Canadian company Prefac-Vibrek. The lower stories' panels were installed using cranes, while the upper stories' panels were installed with a monorail assembly. The precast panels are hung from steel beams that are placed around the hotel building's perimeter. Some openings were also made in the façade so exterior signs could be attached to it. The windows are recessed deeply into the concrete panels, a design similar to a Venetian blind.

==== Signs ====
On Broadway, the base of the façade originally had four signs. The largest measured 30 by 50 feet (9.1 by 15.2 m) and was placed at the center of the Broadway façade, while the other signs measured 23 by 25 feet (7.0 by 7.6 m).

The central sign on Broadway was known as the Kodarama and was originally used by Kodak to display color photos, which were changed several times per year and were accompanied by a caption sign measuring 6 by 50 feet (1.8 by 15.2 m). The photos were printed on large Duratrans strips, which were double-laminated on the front to protect against weather and wind. The Kodak photos were framed by a large display box and were cooled by a vacuum system behind the box. The signs were largely supported on beams that protruded from the façade. The Kodak sign was enlarged in 1999 to a display measuring 52 by 70 feet (16 by 21 m). The enlarged display was divided into three parts: the primary display on the bottom, a Jumbotron in the upper right corner, and a tertiary display on the upper left corner. The Kodarama, along with the Coca-Cola sign, were the only signs along Times Square in the mid-1980s that were sponsored by major companies.

In 2014, a new electronic sign was installed on the Broadway façade, spanning the whole length of the block and wrapping around to 45th and 46th Streets. The screen, made by Mitsubishi Electric, measures 330 by 78 feet (101 by 24 m) and has 24 million pixels. The new screen covers 25,740 square feet (2,391 m^{2}) and is made of interlocking panels measuring 6 by 8 feet (1.8 by 2.4 m). The preexisting framing was extended and reinforced to support the newer sign, and a 57-foot-long (17 m) Vierendeel truss was installed across the center of the Broadway façade.

=== Structural features ===
The foundation is on high-quality rock and uses spread footings capable of 40 short tons per square foot (391 t/m^{2}). The site was excavated to a depth of 60 feet (18 m). The hotel originally had two basement levels, but the first basement level was demolished in the 2010s, creating one basement level with a double-height ceiling. When the basement was modified, a steel frame was built adjacent to the foundation wall.

The superstructure of the hotel consists of 21,500 short tons (19,200 long tons; 19,500 t) of steel, manufactured by the Mosher Steel Company. Some of the steel beams measured as much as 125 feet (38 m) long and weighed up to 70 short tons (63 long tons; 64 t) apiece. As the steel was erected, a layer of minerals bonded with cement was sprayed onto the steel members, providing fireproofing. The columns are placed about 8 feet (2.4 m) behind the façade, and horizontal beams are cantilevered outward from the columns to support the exterior signs. Weidlinger Associates was the structural engineer but, after the hotel was completed, it was reinforced with additional steel framing from Burgess Steel. The second story of the hotel was removed in the 2010s, creating a double-height space on the ground story. The ground-story columns were reinforced with plates, and the depth of some beams was reduced by up to 1 foot (0.30 m).

On the first ten stories, the floor decks consist of concrete poured over sheets of corrugated metal. The guestroom floors above are made of concrete panels, which weigh about 10 short tons (8.9 long tons; 9.1 t) each. They measure 8 feet (2.4 m) wide, 36 or 38 feet (11 or 12 m) long, and 12 inches (300 mm) thick. According to an engineer, the precast slabs provided not only a finished ceiling (as opposed to a bare surface) but also lateral stability. The floor decks contain standard steel trusses at some location, as well as Vierendeel trusses that carry some of the hotel rooms across the width of the atrium. The structural steel is entirely encased inside floor slabs and walls, which allows light to pass into the central atrium.

The freestanding elevator core is made of concrete and is rounded in shape. It was manufactured by Collavino Brothers. The core measures 55 feet (17 m) wide and carries twelve passenger elevators on its exterior, as well as four elevators at the center. The exterior elevators are surrounded by glass and overlook the atrium lobby. The cabs are enclosed by glass and have fiber-optic lighting. The elevator system, supplied by Schindler, has a destination dispatch system, which assigns passengers to elevator cars according to their destination floors. The destination-dispatch system was completed in 2006 and modernized in 2019. Six additional elevators are used by service staff.

=== Interior ===
==== Base ====
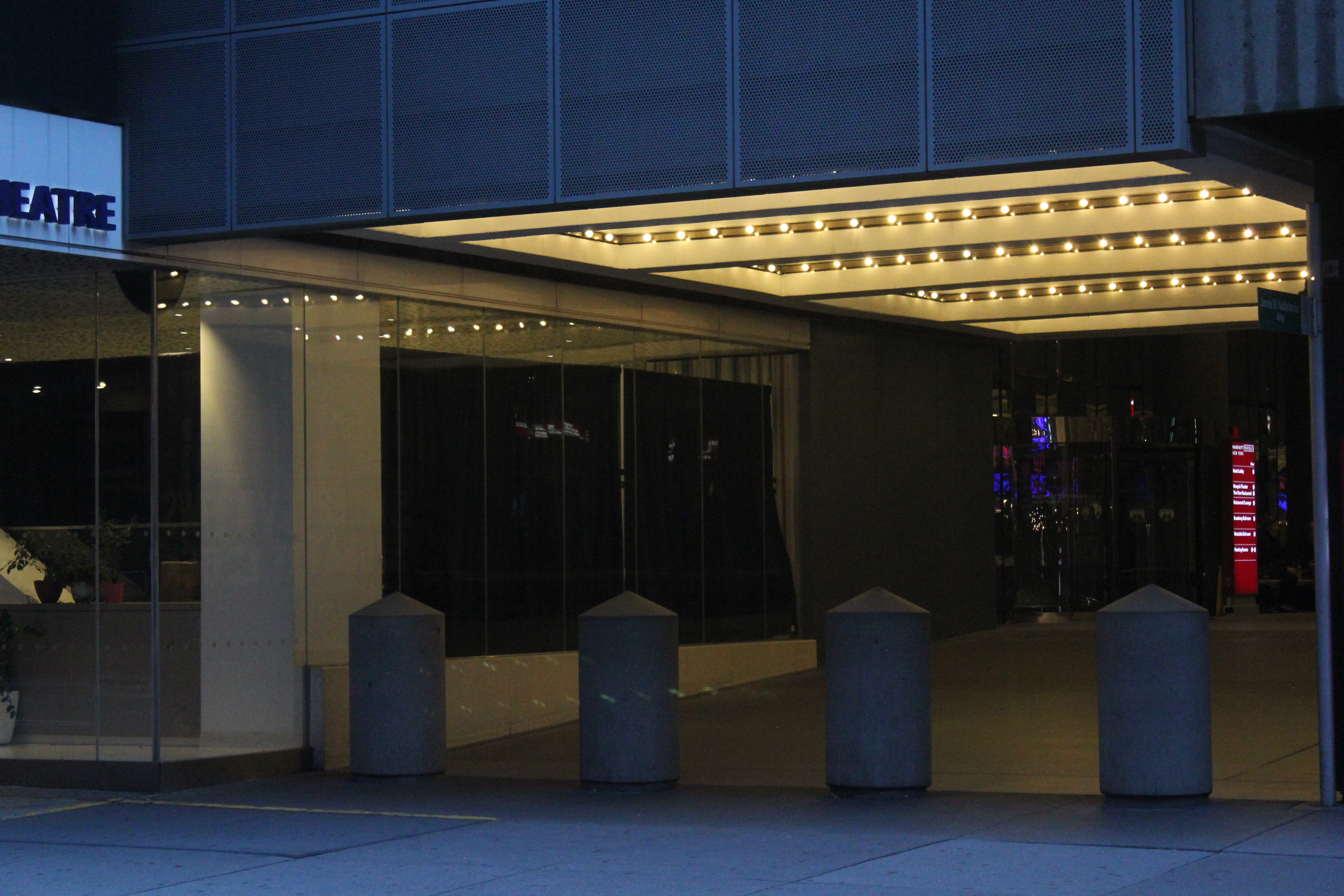
Entrance to the western pedestrian passageway

Under normal zoning regulations, the maximum floor area ratio (FAR) for any building on the hotel's site was 15. During the hotel's planning, the FAR received two bonuses of 20 percent each, bringing the FAR to 21.6. The developers had to include privately owned public space at the building's base for the first bonus, and they built a new theater (the Marquis Theatre) for the second bonus. The privately operated public space consists of two passageways between 45th and 46th Streets. The passageway on the eastern side of the site contains a driveway, which was designed with five vehicular lanes and was intended to divert taxi traffic away from Broadway. To the west is a pedestrian walkway, which functions as an northward extension of Shubert Alley and was proposed as early as 1970. Both the driveway and the Shubert Alley Extension have doors that lead to an indoor pedestrian area.

The ground and second stories were designed with 10,000 square feet (930 m^{2}) of retail space, though the second story was demolished in the 2010s. In the original plans, the retail space would have spanned seven stories at the base, and a ninth-story terrace was to have enclosed the retail space. The seven-story retail mall was part of the floor-area bonus for the hotel, but it was omitted in the final plan. While 40,300 square feet (3,740 m^{2}) of public space was to have been provided in exchange for the floor-area bonus, a 2000 study by the Municipal Art Society could not locate the additional space. Ernest P. Gathwaite, a professor at York College of the City University of New York, designed six landscape murals for the hotel, each measuring 12 feet (3.7 m) wide.

The Marquis Theatre is on the building's third floor. In exchange for including the theater, the hotel was given a bonus of nearly 300,000 square feet (28,000 m^{2}). As a stipulation of the bonus, the New York City Board of Estimate specified that there had to be 1,500 seats in the theater. The stage is immediately above the hotel driveway, and the ballroom is above the theater's ceiling. The third through seventh stories contain theater offices, as well as additional meeting rooms.

==== Atrium lobby ====
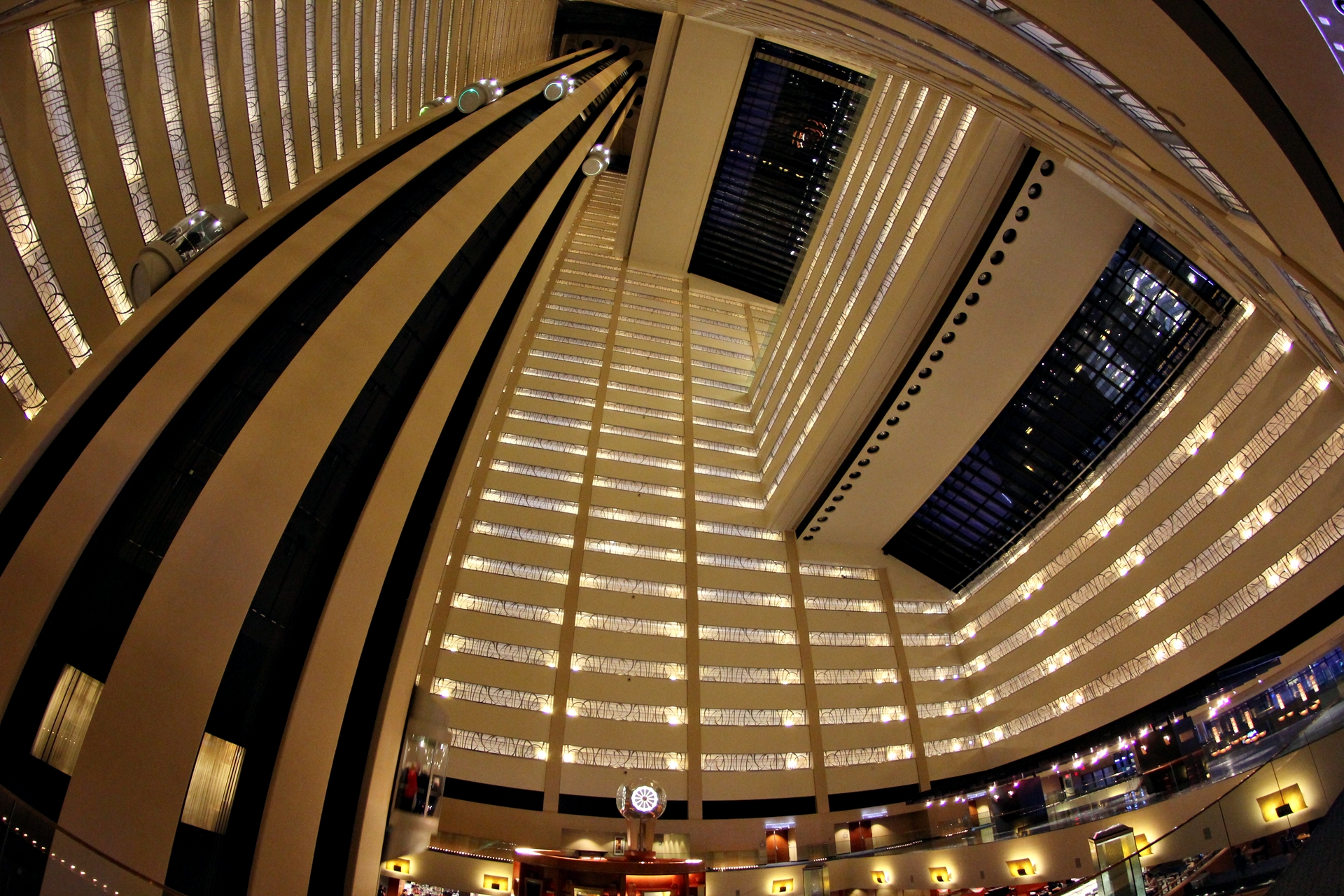
View of atrium

The hotel's atrium lobby is placed on the eighth floor. Because of security concerns when the hotel was constructed in the 1980s, there was originally only one set of escalators leading from street level to the hotel lobby. A planted atrium rises 37 stories from the lobby to the rooftop restaurant. The atrium, extending 400 feet (120 m) tall, is one of the world's tallest indoor spaces. A sky bridge measuring 240 feet (73 m) long is just above the atrium floor. This sky bridge has 90 tons of steel and contains LED signs on the side. The reception desks were originally placed on the south wall. Following a 2020s renovation, the desks were relocated to the north wall, separated by wooden archways, and a prismatic-glass wall was installed behind the desks. In addition, the lobby contains an acrylic sculpture by Parachilna, installed in 2022.

Adjacent to the lobby, the hotel has a set of restaurants and a revolving cocktail lounge on its eastern side. Robert Pinart designed five stained-glass panels for the lobby restaurant: three in the main restaurant area and two in an adjacent cocktail lounge. As of 2022, the eighth floor contains Revel & Rye Bar and Restaurant, which includes a gold-colored ceiling and rows of lighting. There is also a 200-seat members' lounge called the M Club, with a business center and a library. There is an adjoining lounge called the Broadway Lounge, which serves cuisine inspired by food trucks. The space has six chandeliers designed to resemble the Times Square Ball, as well as double-height windows facing Times Square. The Broadway Lounge also connects to the hotel's two outdoor terraces on Broadway, which are known as Perch.

The Marriott Marquis also has a 29,000-square-foot (2,700 m^{2}) ballroom, advertised during construction as the largest in New York City. The main ballroom is known as the Broadway Ballroom and has a maximum capacity of 2,800, with a black "vanishing ceiling" and LED chandeliers. There are also 46 smaller meeting rooms, with a total area of 80,000 square feet (7,400 m^{2}). One of the meeting rooms is the Westside Ballroom, which covers 21,550 square feet (2,002 m^{2}) and has a capacity of 2,400 guests. Another room, the Liberty Ballroom on the eighth floor, has a capacity of 140 to 150 people and faces Shubert Alley. The conference space also includes 40 breakout rooms. There is also a large ninth-story atrium known as the Terrace, connecting several of the meeting rooms. The Terrace is decorated with streetlight-shaped lamps and can also function as a meeting space.

==== Upper stories ====
The hotel was built with 1,876 or 1,877 rooms, each measuring 13.7 by 21 feet (4.2 by 6.4 m). Each room is designed to face the atrium. Rather than physical keys, each room could be entered using a computerized card. The hotel contains rooms in numerous sizes, including "family connector", "deluxe", and "superior" rooms. The rooms also include TVs and custom furnishings. By 2025, there were 1,971 rooms.

The 47th through 49th stories contain the View, New York City's only rooftop revolving restaurant. The View specializes in American cuisine for brunch and dinner. The restaurant is designed with 700 seats. As of 2025, the dining room is on the 47th story, and the bar is on the 48th story. The dining room level generally makes a full revolution every 60 minutes, and the bar level rotates once every 45 minutes. It originally rotated clockwise and made a full revolution every 70 to 80 minutes. The rotating restaurant was manufactured by the Macton Corporation. It consists of a set of static pedestals with wheels attached to them. The restaurant and lounges are then placed on platforms above the wheels; there are rails on the underside of each platform, which one designer compared to the opposite of a train.

== History ==
=== Planning ===
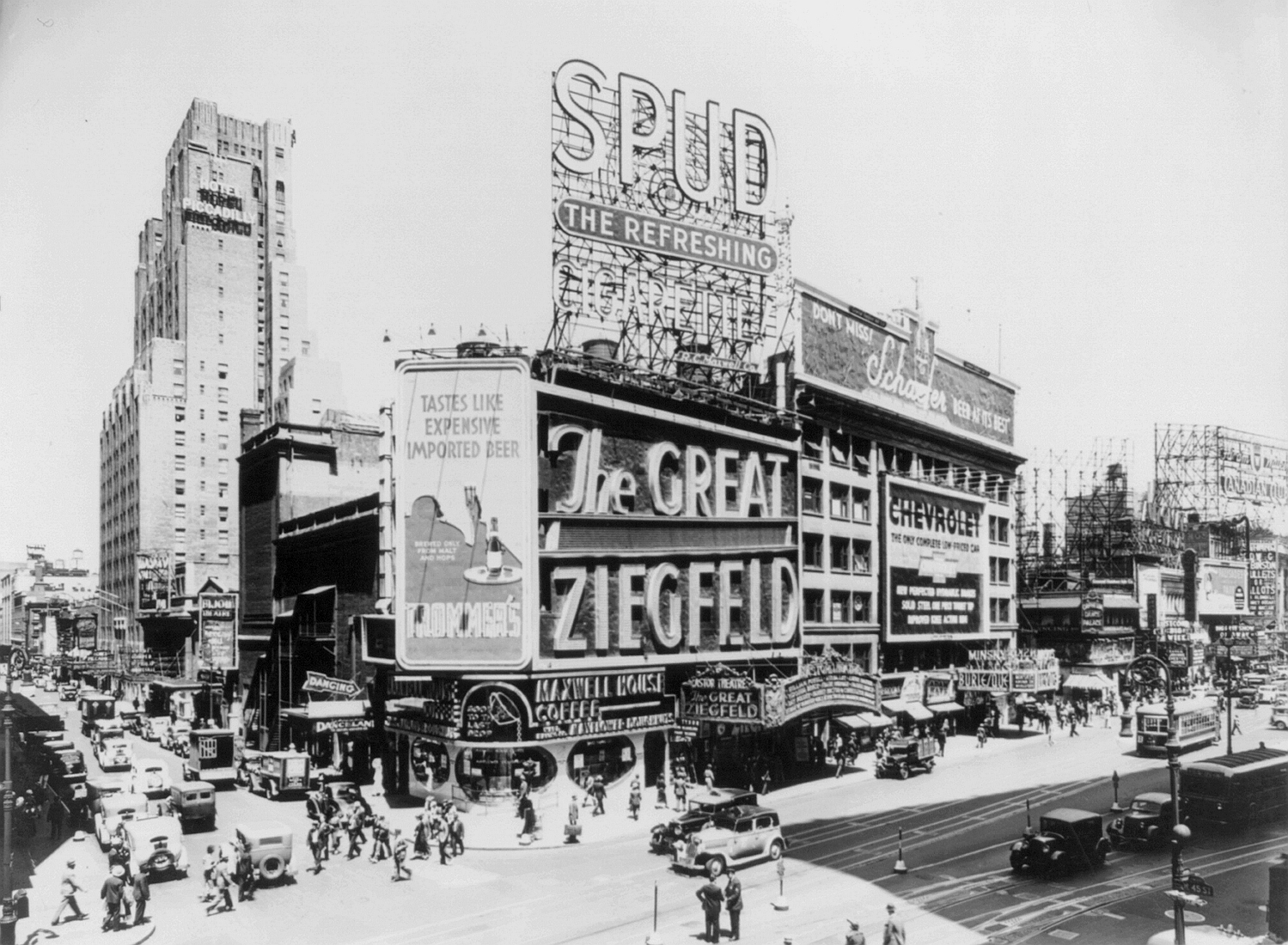
The site of the New York Marriott Marquis was occupied by several theaters including the Astor, Gaiety, and Victoria (pictured).

By the 1960s, Times Square was in decline, and its dilapidated condition was widely perceived among the public as representative of the city's decline as a whole. In the late 1960s, real-estate agent Peter Sharp had acquired the Morosco, Astor, Helen Hayes, and Victoria theaters, with plans to build an office tower on the site. However, Sharp could not find a willing major tenant for the property. Sharp also tried to acquire the Piccadilly Hotel to the west, but the hotel's owners refused to sell.

==== Initial concept and delays ====
Jaquelin T. Robertson, who led the city government's office of Midtown Planning and Development, convinced Sharp in 1970 to hire Robert Venturi as a consultant. Venturi, along with Denise Scott Brown and Steven Izenour, proposed large signs and "low public spaces". Sharp was not impressed with Venturi's plan, and there was too much office space in Midtown, so Venturi's plans were scrapped. Robertson and Sharp then visited Portman's Hyatt Regency Atlanta hotel in 1971, where Robertson recalled Sharp "stayed up half the night looking around". Sharp offered to hire Portman, who readily accepted, as Portman had expressed interest in designing a building in New York City for several years. Portman agreed to provide 90 percent of financing for the project. The New York Times subsequently recalled that Portman had taken the project because New York City was the "most claustrophobic city he had ever seen". Sharp closed some of the theaters in the meantime, including the Astor in 1972. Less than twelve legitimate theaters still existed in Times Square, so closing them was not a major concern to the public.

On November 3, 1972, Western International Hotels (later Westin) and Portman announced they would build a 2,000-room hotel for $75 million. The hotel would contain two towers connected by several multi-story walkways, and it would complement a convention center on the Hudson River, later the Javits Center. At the time, there had been no major hotel projects in New York City since the 1964 World's Fair, and the number of hotel rooms in the city had declined since 1969. Robertson praised the development as a harbinger of "the renaissance of Times Square". By April 1973, the plans for the hotel had been changed to a single tower with a hollow atrium, increasing the projected cost to $90 million. Furthermore, difficulties in obtaining property title for the land lots had delayed the hotel. Portman and mayor John Lindsay officially announced plans for the 54-story, 2,020-room Portman Hotel on July 11, 1973. By then, the projected cost had risen to $150 million. Portman also promised to renovate the 46th Street Theatre (later the Richard Rodgers Theatre) as part of the development. Construction was set to begin in 1974, with the hotel set to open in 1977.

The hotel received mixed reviews, with architectural critics and theatrical personalities being particularly negative toward the project. The hotel also required approval for two special permits to increase the floor area ratio. New York City Planning Commission chairman John Eugene Zuccotti scheduled a hearing for these permits in mid-1973. The Portman Hotel was experiencing delays by the end of 1973 because of a lack of funding. The New York City fiscal crisis had also endangered public funding for the convention center, and, by January 1975, Portman warned that he would withdraw from the Portman Hotel unless the convention center was funded. Construction costs had decreased enough that the hotel only needed $100 million, but only about $38 million had been raised, as potential investors were reluctant to provide funds amid the declining economic conditions. That December, Portman announced he would cancel the plans for the Portman Hotel. Though the designs were completed and the city government had given approvals, investors had not shown interest in the project. The cancellation meant that, for the time being, the Morosco and Helen Hayes theaters could continue to operate. The Bankers Trust Company owned the site of the theaters.

==== Revival of plans ====
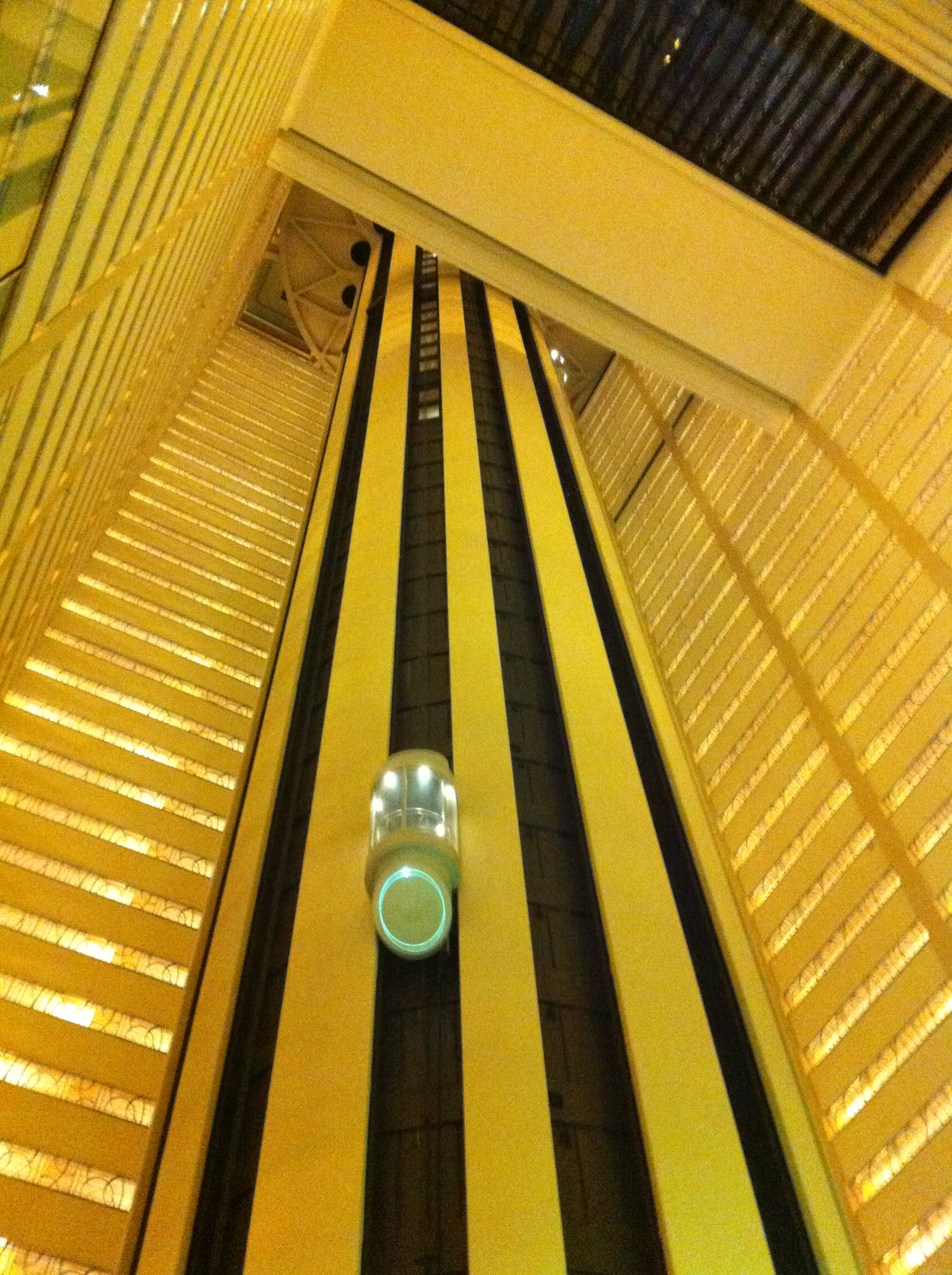
Atrium view

In January 1976, the city negotiated with Portman to revive plans for the hotel. By the middle of the year, the city's hotel industry had recovered and was running near capacity. Portman Properties officials said in March 1978 that the company could raise $150 million for the hotel if the city government received a $15 million federal action grant. The New York City Board of Estimate voted to approve a tax exemption for the hotel that August, thereby permitting Portman Properties to contact potential lenders. The Urban Development Corporation (UDC), an agency of the New York state government, was to obtain the land and lease it back to the hotel operators for a long period; it is unknown how much the UDC paid. Later in 1978, the board authorized the city government to apply for the action grant on Portman's behalf. Gerald Schoenfeld of the Shubert Organization predicted in September 1978 that the hotel was planned to start construction early the following year.

By early 1979, the federal grant had still not been approved. The federal grant application had been submitted but was held in abeyance until the outside financing was secured. The cost of the hotel had risen to at least $240 million by June 1979, though about $60 million of that cost would become from the planned action grant and Portman's equity. Equitable Life Assurance was negotiating with several other lenders to write a mortgage to cover the remaining cost. (Note: According to The New York Times, the lenders would give $170 million of the proposed $250 million cost. According to the New York Daily News, the lenders would give $180 million of the proposed $240 million cost.) Ultimately, Metropolitan Life and Manufacturers Hanover joined Equitable in funding the project. Trust Houses Forte of London expressed interest in operating the hotel, but the developers announced in November 1979 that they still had difficulties obtaining financing. The operators of the Piccadilly Hotel said the same month that they would not sell to Portman. The Piccadilly planned to continue offering low rates for their rooms, as opposed to the luxury prices planned for the Portman Hotel.

==== Difficulties ====
The plans entailed the demolition of the original Helen Hayes, Morosco, and Bijou, as well as the remnants of the Astor and Gaiety. Theatrical advocates and preservationists felt the Portman Hotel's new theater would be bulky and impersonal, like the Minskoff and the Uris (Gershwin). The New York City Landmarks Preservation Commission (LPC) had internally described the Helen Hayes as "one of the finest theaters" in New York City, and the Helen Hayes had been declared eligible for National Register of Historic Places (NRHP) listing in 1978. In November 1979, a lawyer filed a lawsuit to force the LPC to consider the old Helen Hayes Theatre as a city landmark, though the LPC had no opinion on the theaters. The next month, Actors' Equity Association asked the city to reconsider the demolition of the old theaters. The International Alliance of Theatrical Stage Employees conversely supported the project, as did theatrical operators such as the Shubert Organization.

In February 1980, actors such as Anthony Perkins, José Ferrer, and Tony Randall protested the proposed demolition of the Helen Hayes, Morosco, and Bijou. With the city government set to obtain the Piccadilly Hotel through land condemnation, the Piccadilly's owners sued in March 1980 to stop the condemnation. Actors' Equity collected signatures for a petition against the federal action grant, which still had not been distributed. In July 1980, Manhattan Community Board 5 voted to affirm the Portman Hotel, despite testimony from opponents including impresario Joseph Papp. The Times reported that the project would probably proceed because of low interest rates and high demand for hotel rooms. Opponents brought the issue before a New York City Council committee that had no power over the hotel's approval, and they also alleged that Community Board 5 had approved the hotel without sufficient information.

The city government gave approval in November 1980 to seek an additional $6.5 million in action grants, or $21.5 million total. The next month, the Piccadilly's owners settled their lawsuit against the city, enabling Portman to acquire that site. The project's remaining opponents, including Actors' Equity, filed a new lawsuit against the hotel. The United States Department of Housing and Urban Development formally placed the federal action grant on hold in January 1981, supposedly because the documents had been sent a few days late. The incoming administration of Ronald Reagan planned to eliminate the grant program altogether, though mayor Ed Koch expressed confidence the hotel could be built regardless of the grant. The action grant was approved in April 1981.

=== Development ===
Portman had begun formally acquiring land for the hotel in January 1981, terminating existing leases. Marriott was reported as the likely operator of the new hotel that March and subsequently signed a 25-year contract to manage the hotel. The hotel continued to be known colloquially as the Portman Hotel, but it encountered so many delays that it was nicknamed "Portman's Folly". The hotel's developer was officially known as the Times Square Hotel Company, which leased the land from the UDC at $900,000 per year. The original lease ran for 75 years, but Marriott could exercise an option to buy the land at fair market value after paying off the federal grant. A financing agreement was finalized in March 1982.

==== Site clearing and preservation efforts ====
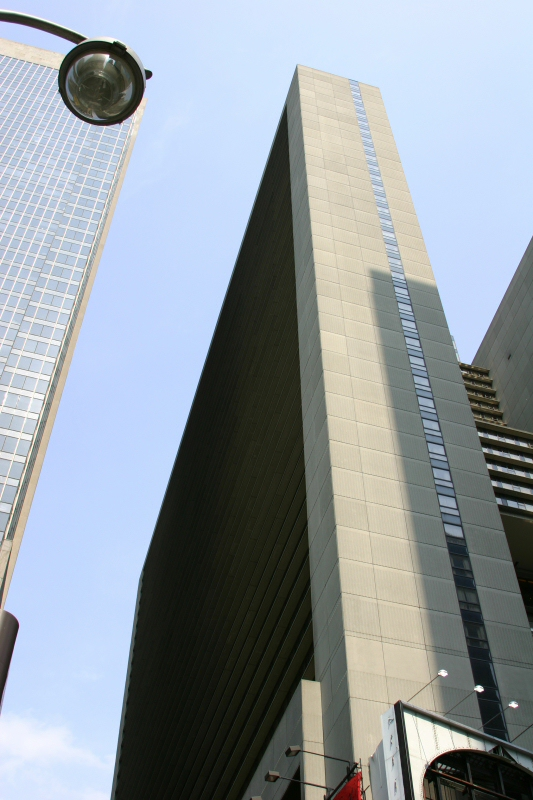
Façade of the hotel as seen from Broadway and 45th Street

By mid-1981, the only remaining issues to address before the start of construction were a public hearing for the planning process, as well as a lawsuit from Actors' Equity. Though opponents made many comments at the public hearings, the city published an environmental impact statement in favor of Portman's plans. As a last-ditch effort, opponents put forth a competing proposal by Lee Harris Pomeroy, which was largely similar to Portman's plans but would cantilever the hotel over the theaters. Portman Properties did not challenge the validity of the proposal but said it would further prolong the hotel's construction, and the City Planning Commission ultimately denied Pomeroy's proposal. Nevertheless, Pomeroy's plan earned a merit award from the Municipal Art Society. A pedestrian plaza was also planned for the section of Broadway in front of the hotel, but this too was controversial. In general, supporters of the hotel also advocated for the pedestrian plaza, while opponents of the hotel were against the plaza.

Actors' Equity and other preservation groups had tried to add the Morosco to the NRHP in early 1981, though the federal government initially rejected the move. After opponents further advocated NRHP listings for the site, the Morosco was deemed eligible for the NRHP that November. Subsequently, lawyers for Actors' Equity and Natural Resources Defense Council accused Reagan aide Lyn Nofziger and interior secretary James G. Watt of coercing the Advisory Council on Historic Preservation in favor of the Portman development. A Times writer stated that the preservation issue had become particularly "heated among playwrights", to the point where it could not be discussed in theatrical meetings. A federal appeals court granted a temporary injunction against demolishing the Morosco and Helen Hayes theaters on January 6, 1982, but a state court approved the demolition three days later. By January 15, the Bijou was demolished.

A federal judge ruled to allow the other theaters' demolition in February 1982, rejecting claims of political influence. Actors held a protest to save the theaters on March 3, and a state judge granted two week-long injunctions. A federal injunction was also in place until the Supreme Court of the United States chose whether to hear the case. The New York Court of Appeals refused to hear an appeal on March 17, and it rejected another appeal three days later. By then, three of the five theaters had been demolished. Robert Redford filed a lawsuit to stop the hotel's construction on the technicality that it would be built on the pedestrian plaza. Demolition of the Helen Hayes and Morosco commenced on March 22, after the U.S. Supreme Court refused to hear the case, and several high-profile actors and theatrical personalities were arrested in the ensuing protests. The Morosco was demolished quickly as it was never listed on the NRHP, but some historically and architecturally significant items from the Helen Hayes were preserved. The controversy over the theaters' demolition prompted a larger-scale preservation movement for Broadway theaters in the 1980s.

==== Construction ====
By May 1982, Portman indicated he would drop plans for the Broadway pedestrian plaza, citing large community opposition. The façade had to be redesigned as a result of the pedestrian plaza's cancellation. The site had been cleared by mid-1982, except for the Piccadilly Hotel. That July, Portman had put together $15 million to acquire the site of the Piccadilly Hotel, which was closed immediately. Simultaneously, Portman Properties signed contracts with its lenders for a $221.5 million financing package, which would fund much of the $320 million cost. Equitable Life, Metropolitan Life, Manufacturers Hanover, and the New York State Common Retirement Fund would collectively loan $200 million,(composed of a $150 million first mortgage and $50 million second mortgage) while the city would loan the action grant of $21.5 million. The Piccadilly's items were then sold off, but its demolition was delayed in late 1982 due to a lack of proper permits. The Portman Hotel's foundation was excavated through blasting, which had to be timed to avoid interrupting performances at nearby theaters.

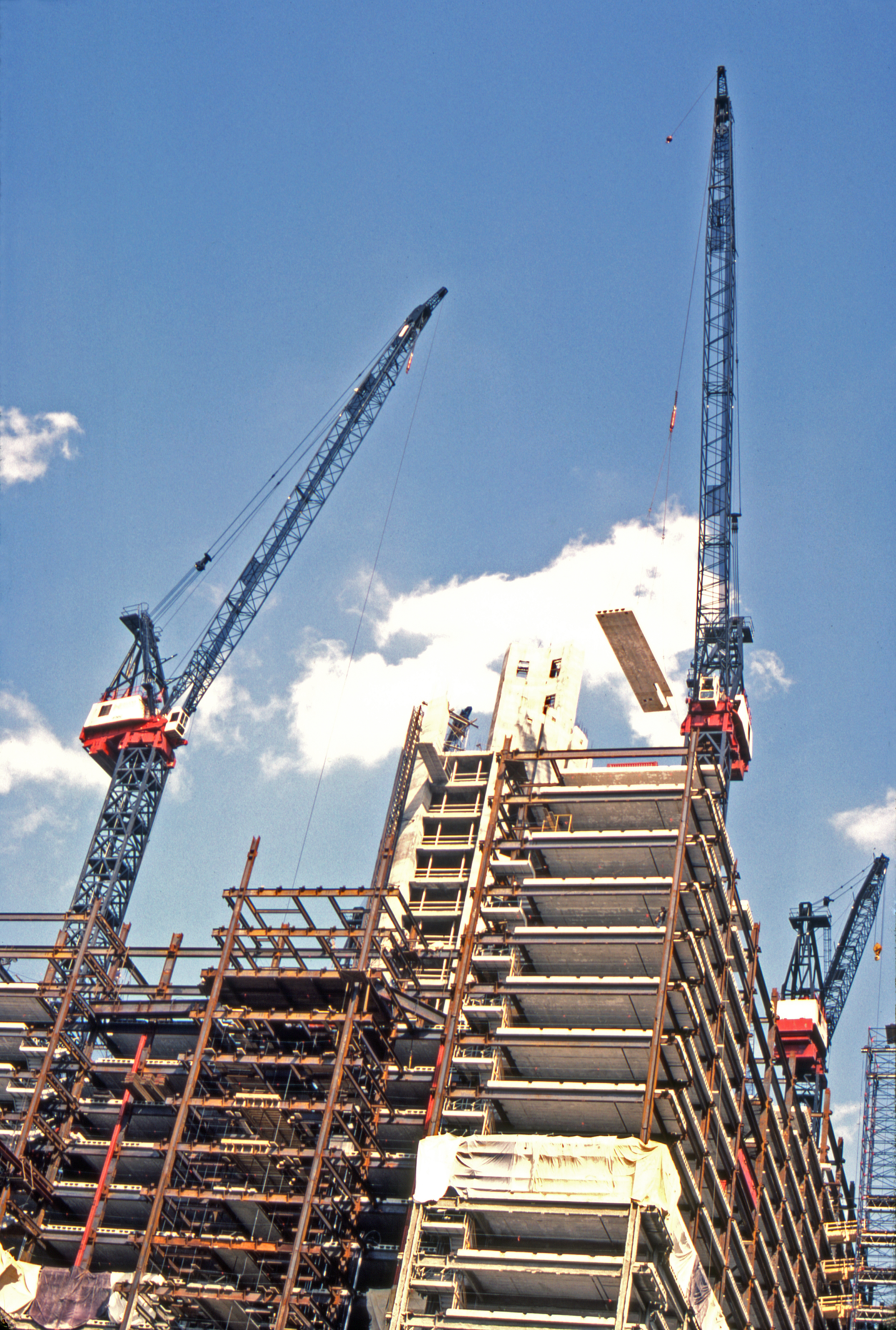
The hotel under construction in June 1984

The Portman Hotel was one of several in New York City being built in the mid-1980s, with a collective 3,500 rooms between them. Marriott Corporation president Bill Marriott and the company's executive vice president Fred Malek hoped the new hotel would revitalize Times Square, the decline of which they had personally witnessed when they were younger. The hotel was still not officially named until the end of 1982, when it became the "Marriott Marquis". By then, excavations were nearly complete. The concrete elevator core was then poured through a steel-and-wood formwork that was moved upward at a rate of 1 foot (0.30 m) per hour. The core had risen to the fourth story in January 1983. A sign with the Marriott name was hung on the core, though members of the public were still unaware that Marriott was in charge of the project, according to a New York Daily News account. The core had risen to nearly its full height by mid-1983, with the girders to be built afterward.

The steel superstructure was built after the elevator core. Because of the heavy traffic and densely built neighborhood, there was only a small amount of space where builders could work, and materials could not be staged nearby. The steel beams were therefore transported from a facility in Kearny, New Jersey, and then installed immediately. Work typically took place on the east side of the site during afternoons, when the theaters to the west were giving matinee productions. After a protest in mid-1983 over the lack of minority workers at the site, the developers hired additional minority workers to comply with a UDC rule, and several women joined the then-exclusively-male project. Delays also ensued due to labor strikes and alleged sabotage; The Wall Street Journal quoted an anonymous source as saying that already-installed electrical wiring would be ripped out and that cement would be flushed down the toilet. In addition, due to threats of strikes from multiple labor unions, steel beams could not be delivered directly to the site, and workers had to pour the concrete floors on site instead of using precast concrete.

==== Completion ====
The Marriott Marquis was refinanced with $328.5 million from 23 lenders in January 1984. Marriott put up 89 percent of the equity and Portman put up the remainder. By then, potential guests had made at least 300,000 nights of reservations at the Marriott Marquis. One guest had reserved a room for the Times Square Ball drop on New Year's Eve 1999, which the guest ultimately attended. The Marriott chain also began negotiating with potential theater operators. The Marriott Marquis planned to charge $175 per room per night. The costs of the hotel had risen to $400 million. The hotel topped out at a ceremony in October 1984. At the ceremony, Koch praised the hotel as the "first gem in the new Times Square crown".

In November 1984, the Nederlander Organization accepted the rights to operate the hotel's theater. As the hotel was being completed in mid-1985, a worker was killed after falling several stories at the site. Prior to the hotel's opening, the Times described the hotel as "the linchpin of an ambitious plan to redevelop Times Square", and several major organizations had booked conventions there. To prepare for the official opening, some "practice meals" were held in the ballroom for various charities and government agencies. Additionally, in 1985, Portman bought a 28.68 percent ownership stake in the hotel for $26.3 million, and he took a $375 million loan at a 12 percent interest rate.

=== Operation ===
==== Opening and early years ====
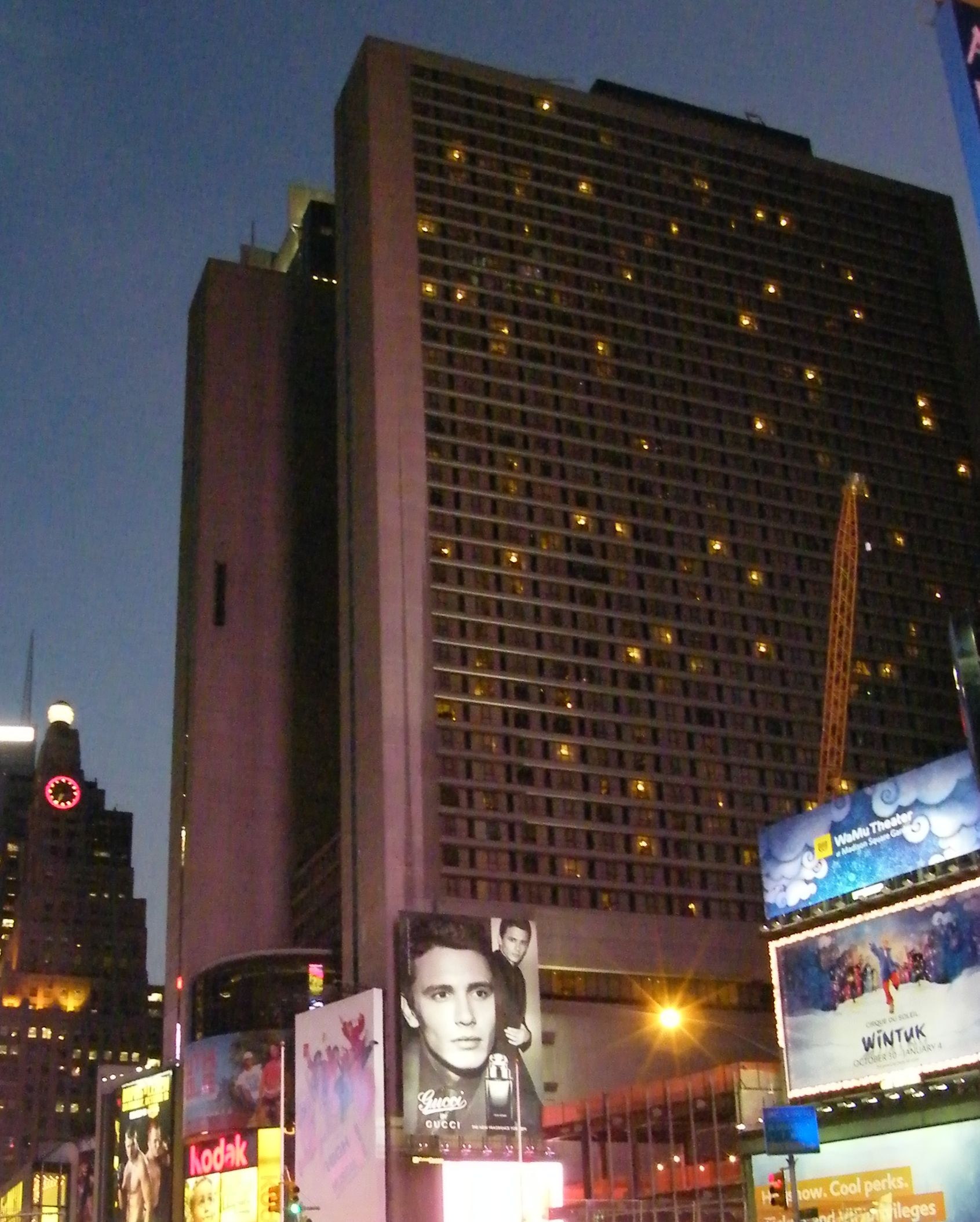
Seen at night

The Marriott Marquis opened on September 3, 1985. It had been slated to open two days earlier, but there had been delays in obtaining a certificate of occupancy for the eighth story. The ultimate approval was given orally on the afternoon before it opened, just before a convention of the Emergency Nurses Association was scheduled to take place at the hotel. The initial opening included the meeting space, restaurants, and five hundred rooms on the lower floors. The rooftop revolving restaurant and theater were still not open. At the time, the hotel was not expected to be finished until the end of that year, but 1.2 million nights of reservations had been booked through 1995. Marriott executives projected that it might take years for the hotel to become profitable. Actors Equity still held resentment against the hotel, advocating for the Actors Fund of America to cancel a planned benefit there shortly after the hotel's opening.

The hotel was formally dedicated in October 1985, and most of the rooms were open by that time. The Marriott Marquis was one of 13 large hotels, with a combined 9,000 rooms, that had opened in New York City during the early 1980s. In late 1985, Kodak installed the world's largest color photograph display on one of the panels outside the hotel. The Marquis Theatre within the hotel opened in July 1986. In its first two years, the Marriott Marquis had one million guests. The average room rates in 1986 and 1987 were far below the posted rates, in part because nearly half of its patronage was group business, much higher than Marriott originally projected. Though the controversy over the hotel largely subsided, some Broadway performers refused to visit the hotel years after its completion. The Marriott Marquis's events included the National Football League Draft, which was hosted at the hotel from 1986 to 1994. By the late 1980s, the Marriott Marquis had an occupancy rate of 80 percent year-round, higher than other hotels in Manhattan. It had been one of several hotels to be developed around Times Square, as well as in New York City in general, during the 1980s.

==== 1990s and 2000s ====
After the hotel's completion, the proportion of tourists staying there gradually increased. By the early 1990s, Portman was having trouble paying off his $375 million loan. As a result, at the end of 1993, the newly spun-off Host Marriott obtained a 28.6 percent ownership stake in the Marriott Marquis from Portman after he defaulted on his loan. The following year, coffee brand Maxwell House installed a sign on the hotel's façade. By the mid-1990s, the New York Marriott Marquis was highly profitable, especially with the ongoing revitalization of Times Square. A 1997 New York Times report stated that the hotel's rooms had an occupancy rate of 90 percent year-round, while Crain's New York stated that the New York Marquis was the "most successful hotel worldwide" in the Marriott brand when considering its size, revenue, or occupancy rate. At the time, the hotel had 1,700 employees who spoke 47 languages.

In advance of the 1998 Goodwill Games, Marriott affixed a three-story sign made of vinyl panels onto the façade. In 1998, the administration of mayor Rudy Giuliani shortened the site's lease from 75 to 35 years. Marriott would pay $19.9 million when the lease expired in 2017, and Marriott would make a fixed payment on the lease instead of paying a percentage of the taxes. The Giuliani administration said the move would allow the city to receive the $19.9 million forty years early and would increase tax revenue by $16 million per year for forty years. The Kodak sign on the façade was renovated and enlarged in 1999.

From the hotel's opening, congestion in the elevators had been a major issue, with waits stretching up to half an hour. The elevators accounted for three of four complaints about the hotel, which itself had one of the most complaints of any Marriott hotel. As a result, the six service elevators were renovated between 2002 and 2004 with the installation of a destination dispatch system. The 16 guest elevators were renovated with a destination dispatch system starting in 2004 and were completed in 2006. The destination dispatch system was installed because the design of the elevator core prevented the installation of additional elevators. The minibars in the guest rooms were removed by the mid-2000s due to low use. Through the late 2000s, the hotel had a 90 percent occupancy rate throughout the year. A 2008 appraisal found the hotel to be worth $579.7 million, making it the most valuable hotel in the city.

==== 2010s to present ====
Marriott offered to pay $10.7 million for the hotel site in 2010, though this was unsuccessful. The guestrooms were renovated in 2011 and 2012. As part of the renovation, a restaurant called Crossroads was opened, and a lounge called the Broadway Lounge was also refurbished. By April 2012, the Kodak sign was no longer profitable and Kodak wished to sell its lease to the sign. Vornado Realty Trust signed a 20-year lease that August to redevelop the Marriott Marquis's retail space. The company planned to spend up to $140 million on upgrading the signage at the base and renovating the retail space. Vornado expected that the upgraded sign would be highly profitable. In 2013, Host Hotels & Resorts acquired outright ownership of the land under the Marriott Marquis from the Empire State Development Corporation (ESD), the parent organization of the UDC, for $19.9 million due to a clause in the renegotiation of the lease from the ESD in 1998. City comptroller John Liu sharply criticized the price, saying the site had a market value of $193 million.

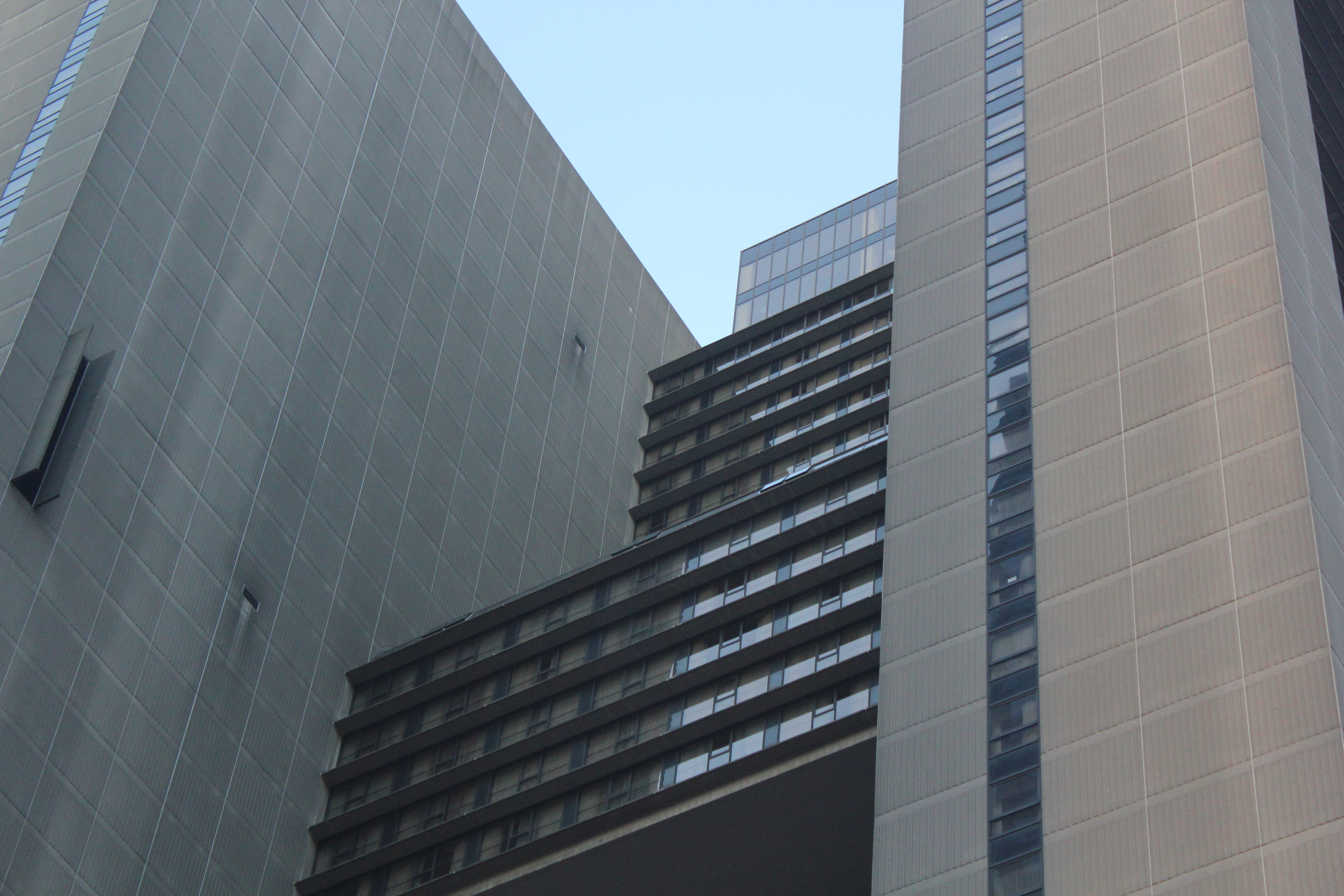
Recessed sections of hotel rooms between the two main slabs

An enlarged electronic sign at the base was completed in November 2014. In September 2018, Vornado acquired the remaining 46 percent ownership stake in the Marriott Marquis's retail space from Host Hotels & Resorts for $442 million, giving Vornado full control of the retail space and exterior sign. At the time, the retail tenants included Invicta, Levi's, Sephora, Swatch, and T-Mobile. During the COVID-19 pandemic in 2020, in which demand for the hotel decreased greatly, Marriott decided to outsource all of its more than 850 foodservice-worker positions. In December 2020, Marriott notified all of the foodservice workers that they would be fired by the following March. The move led to protests from the laid-off workers and an investigation from the Attorney General of New York, and its remaining workers voted to unionize in early 2021. At the time, the hotel's workers had never been unionized.

A major renovation of the hotel began in the late 2010s. Omnibuild oversaw a 16-month, $30 million renovation of the Marriott Marquis. As part of the renovation, the bars, restaurants, meeting rooms, and ballrooms were upgraded, and a sky bridge measuring 240 feet (73 m) long was installed at the ninth story. In addition, a boiler plant that converted gas to steam was installed. The Union Square Hospitality Group was selected to provide food service to the Marriott Marquis's rooms. During late 2022, one of the Marriott Marquis's suites was rethemed to the musical Beetlejuice, which at the time was being staged at the Marquis Theatre. The Union Square Hospitality Group took over the hotel's revolving restaurant in late 2024, and Danny Meyer reopened the restaurant in February 2025 after a renovation. In addition, Vornado obtained a $450 million loan in April 2025, using the hotel's retail space and the Marquis Theatre as collateral; at the time, the property was free of debt. In January 2026, the large billboard wrapping around the hotel's base was turned off in preparation for its replacement with an upgraded display.

== Critical reception ==
Of the original plans, architectural critic Ada Louise Huxtable wrote that the Portman Hotel "will be not only the city's tallest, but also its most dramatic, repeating and enlarging a successful Portman formula already in operation in Atlanta, Chicago, and San Francisco". Huxtable wrote that Times Square's redevelopment was contingent on whether the "large, tide-turning" Portman Hotel was able to succeed. Architectural Forum wrote that "any Portman in a storm (especially that of Times Square) will do just fine", while The New Yorker commented, "The hotel looked like fun". Conversely, Stanley Abercrombie of Architecture Plus said "the hotel threatens to effect, at street level, a weakening rather than a strengthening of Times Square vitality".

In 1980, after the redesigned hotel was revealed, Paul Goldberger wrote that he supported the hotel plans. Though Goldberger was slightly disturbed by the planned destruction of the theaters, "the life of an ongoing city is always one of tradeoffs". Abercrombie, writing for the Journal of the Institute of American Architects, said in 1982: "The new hotel may do wonderful things for the area, but it could have been even more beneficial if another site had been chosen for it." Michael Sorkin characterized the hotel as "hopelessly self-centered". When the hotel finally opened, Goldberger called the design outdated, with the mass "looming over Times Square like an upended bunker". Newsday said two years after the hotel's completion that the "exterior could hold its own against anything in Dallas", while the "interior resembles the set where Luke Skywalker battled Darth Vader." Herbert Muschamp said: "Throughout the hotel, design issues a protective order that makes the city outside a forbidding presence, mercifully kept at bay." U.S. News & World Report, which did not rank the hotel among the top 100 in New York City, wrote: "For some previous visitors it's this Marriott's high-caliber service that wins them over [...] but for others it's the enviable location."

== See also ==
- List of buildings and structures on Broadway in Manhattan
- List of hotels in New York City

Preceded by Park Central Hotel	Venues of the NFL draft 1986–1994	Succeeded by The Theatre at Madison Square Garden
