= Bijou Theatre (Manhattan, 1917) =

Former Broadway theater in Manhattan, New York

209 West 45th Street
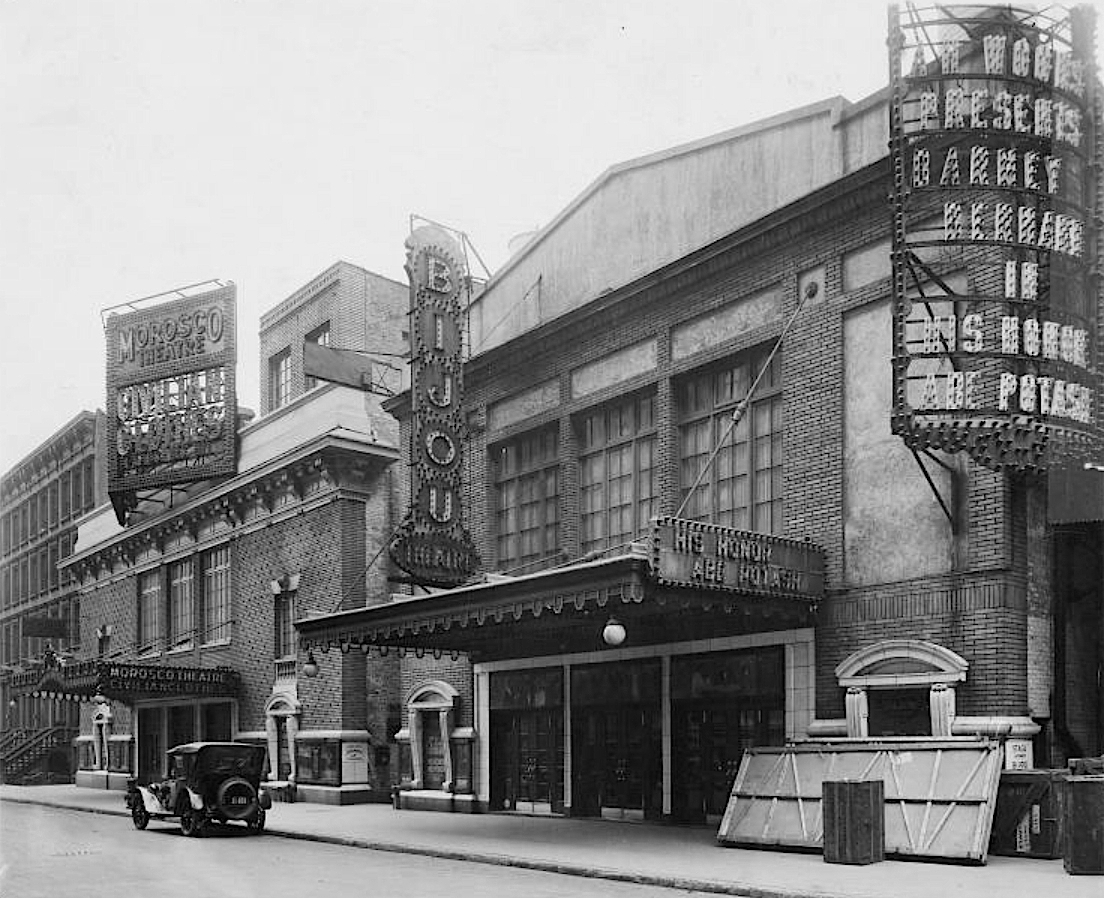
- 209 W. 45th St.

General information
- Location: 209 West 45th Street (Manhattan), New York City, New York, U.S.
- Coordinates: 40°45′30.5″N 73°59′10.5″W
- Opened: 1917 (109 years ago)
- Demolished: 1982 (44 years ago)

The Bijou Theatre was a former Broadway theater in New York City that opened in 1917 and was demolished in 1982. It was built by the Shubert family in 1917 at 209 West 45th Street, and was the smallest of the houses they operated with a capacity of 603. Although it did not keep the planned name of the Theatre Francais, it retained its French decor. It was one of three theaters that hosted the premiere season of the musical Fancy Free—but primarily it presented plays by many writers, including Sacha Guitry, John Galsworthy, A. A. Milne, James M. Barrie, Herman J. Mankiewicz, Leslie Howard, Anton Chekhov, Henrik Ibsen, Luigi Pirandello, Graham Greene, Eugene O'Neill, William Saroyan, and Seán O'Casey.

The Oscar-winning British film The Red Shoes played the Bijou for 107 weeks, from October 21, 1948, to November 13, 1950. Starting on November 16, 1950, as the Bijou, it hosted the film Cyrano de Bergerac, starring José Ferrer.

In 1951, it became a CBS radio studio, then—as the D. W. Griffith Theatre—it presented art films, and was subsequently reduced in size due to the expansion of the adjacent Astor Theatre. From January 22, 1963 until June 7, 1965, it operated as the Toho Cinema, showing Japanese films, the first being Akira Kurosawa's The Bad Sleep Well (1960). It was reinstated as the Bijou Theatre in 1965, and was home to arguably its largest hit—Mummenschanz—but was demolished in 1982 to make room for the Marriott Marquis Hotel.

== See also ==
- List of Broadway theaters § Demolished Broadway theaters
