= Loney Haskell =

American vaudeville entertainer and theatre manager

Loney Haskell (1870 – October 20, 1933) was an American veteran vaudeville entertainer and theatre manager. He was a writer, a monologist, and a master of ceremonies. Haskell worked as the secretary of the Jewish Theatrical Guild of America and in that capacity eulogized his friend Harry Houdini.

== Career ==
Haskell was born as Lorne Levy in Newark, New Jersey in 1870 and he took up a mercantile career. By 1898 he had chosen to retire from that business and he gained employ with burlesque producers Hurtig and Seaman as a librettist and performer. Haskell had an interest in entertainment having recorded the short silent film Facial Expressions by Loney Haskell in 1897 in which he demonstrated a variety of emotions with the camera close in to his face.

The Fourteenth Street Theatre featured a production of In New York Town between October 30 and November 4, 1905. The comedy musical was based on the work of Haskell and Willard Holcomb with music by Albert Von Tilzer.

Haskell initially gained popularity in vaudeville as a monologist. He then made a name for himself as a lecturer for dime museum-style acts promoted by Willie Hammerstein, introducing and discussing Hammerstein's curiosities such as "The Half Woman". He had the ability to entertain the audience even if the act themselves were unable to communicate well. Haskell provided running commentary for numerous "freak" acts. In 1912 Haskell acted as the interpreter for Don the Talking Dog, fielding questions for the canine and helping to present his responses. Don featured on the same bill as famed escapologist Harry Houdini. Variety reported that Haskell does not get mentioned in the program but that he should divide the billing with the dog given that he utilized nine of the twelve minutes. According to celebrity columnist O. O. McIntyre, Haskell became so fond of the dog that "in one-night stands he slept in the dog's kennel".

Haskell was a friend of Oscar Hammerstein and worked as the assistant manager of the Victoria Theatre alongside Hammerstein's son, Willie. On Willie's death Haskell continued to operate the theatre now alongside Arthur Hammerstein. Houdini was also a friend of Haskell's and Haskell, in his capacity as secretary of the Jewish Theatrical Guild of America, would go on to eulogize Houdini in 1926.

== Death ==
Haskell died in the offices of the Jewish Theatrical Guild on October 20, 1933.
