= Santa Maria (operetta) =

Operetta by Oscar Hammerstein I

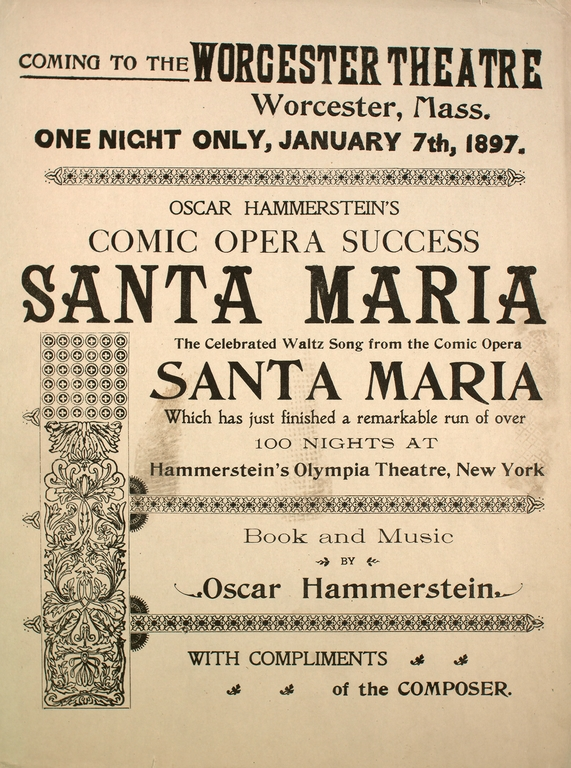
Sheet music for "Santa Maria, My Joy, My Pride"

Santa Maria is an operetta, or 'comic opera', in three acts with a book, music and lyrics by Oscar Hammerstein I. It opened at Hammerstein's Olympia Theatre in New York City on September 14, 1896. After closing on December 19, 1896, it went on tour, starting at the Alvin Theatre in Pittsburgh, Pennsylvania, on December 21, 1896.

The final scene, in which Bertrand and Santa Maria are proclaimed future King and Queen, was set as a "Palace of Ice" constructed from aluminum, a novel design for 1896. Edna May, who would soon become a star in Edwardian musical comedies, made her Broadway debut in the piece.

== Plot ==
Act 1 – Holland in the 18th century

The protagonist, as an infant, was found in a forest by Santa, a bird catcher. He named her Maria and raised her to train birds. As she is somewhat of a vixen, her jocular neighbors reversed her name to Santa Maria. Meanwhile, the childless King of Holland is about to be divorced at the demand of some conspirators, when a gypsy is bribed to reveal to him that he has a son, born twenty years before, while he was away at war. This infant had been stolen from its cradle, and Lieutenant Bertrand, a young officer who has been sentenced to death, volunteers to go in search of the lost Prince.

Act 2 – Zambazoo, Italy

Three years later, Bertrand is in Italy, where he is imprisoned for kissing an old woman by mistake. A tailor is also imprisoned for spoiling a dress and is to be tried by a jury of women. Bertrand bribes the tailor to change identities with him and is ordered by the jury to try the dress on Santa Maria, the complainant. On Santa Maria's arm he discovers the birthmark, a lily and a crown, that proves her to be the child of the King of Holland he has been seeking for three years – a daughter rather than a son. The two fall in love, and Bertram is pardoned.

Act 3 – Holland

Bertrand and Santa Maria return home to Holland and are proclaimed the future King and Queen.

== Roles and original cast ==
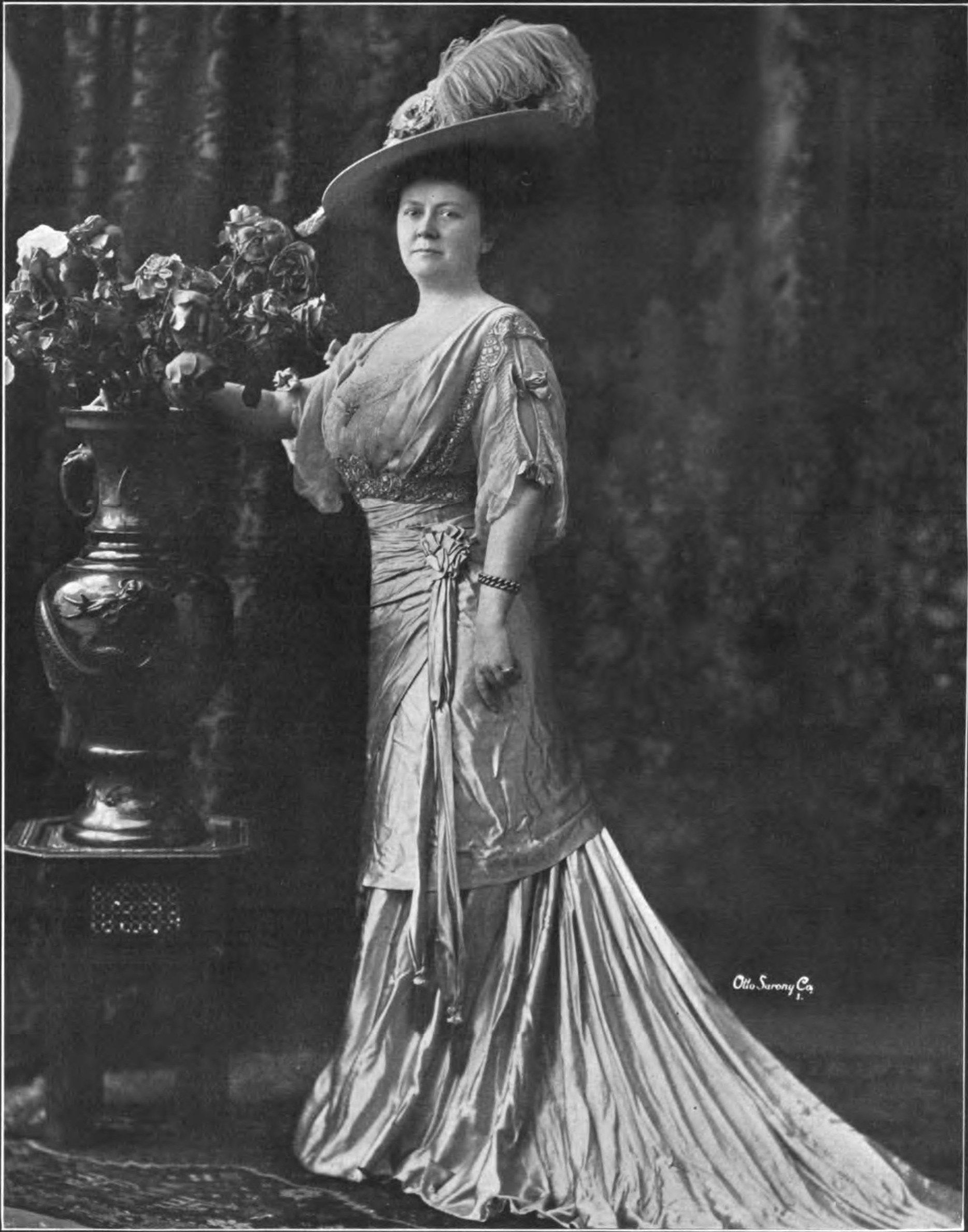
Camille d'Arville 1909

Role	Creator
Santa Maria	Camille D'Arville
Sarracco, a gypsy	Lucille Saunders
Princess Therese de Savoy	Marie Halton
Queen of Holland	Juliette Preston
Elise von Hagen	Eleanor Elton
Clairette Styrberg	Edna May Pettie
Amida	Alice Rice
Lieutenant Bertrand	Julius Steger
Moccarelli	James T. Powers
King Henry William	H. W. Tredennick
Marquis de Villadon	Joseph Frankau
Bombazine	Frederick Bach
Sheriff	Albert McGucken
Captain François	Albert Lellman

== Reception ==
The New York Times noted the audience's enthusiastic response to the piece and commented, "There is elemental strength, and humor too, in some of the situations here developed.... The first act is deliciously naïve.... But there is some fun in it, and plenty of jingle and color.... Mr. Hammerstein is scarcely a Sullivan or Suppe. Nor is he, as a librettist, a rival of Gilbert. But he is a man of extraordinary versatility and wonderful energy, who is doing much in a cheerful and vigorous way to entertain his fellow-citizens. There is good reason for his popularity."

Hammerstein biographer Vincent Sheean summed up the composer's experience with Santa Maria:

The failure of the work was not quite so overwhelming as that of [Hammerstein's] Marguerite, perhaps because Hammerstein had spent a great deal of money on its production. He had an orchestra of fifty-five in the pit, for example, which was about twice the size of the usual musical-comedy orchestra. His principals were expensive, his costumes and settings lavish. (An odd touch in the decor, which Arthur recalled, was a scene made of papier-mâché, with peaks like mountains, covered with tinfoil. By the end of the first week the foil began to turn black and had to be refreshed regularly with paint.)... The critics saw redeeming features in Santa Maria, and for a few days there was some hope that it might attract a public. That hope was vain, and in the end – after more than fair trial – it brought its author, composer, and producer less than ten per cent of the actual cash he had spent on it. In his rage at the failure of his opera, Oscar accused his sons Willie and Arthur of standing outside the theater and stopping would-be patrons from buying tickets.

== Song list ==
- Down by the Hillside I Met Her
- Divorce Song
- Eskimo's Song
- Let Us Jolly Be
- Santa Maria, My Joy, My Pride
- Bring Back to Me My Childhood Days
- When I Found My First One Gray Hair
