= New Victory Theater =

Children's theater in Manhattan, New York

- Theatre Republic, Belasco Theatre, Minsky's Burlesque, Victory Theater
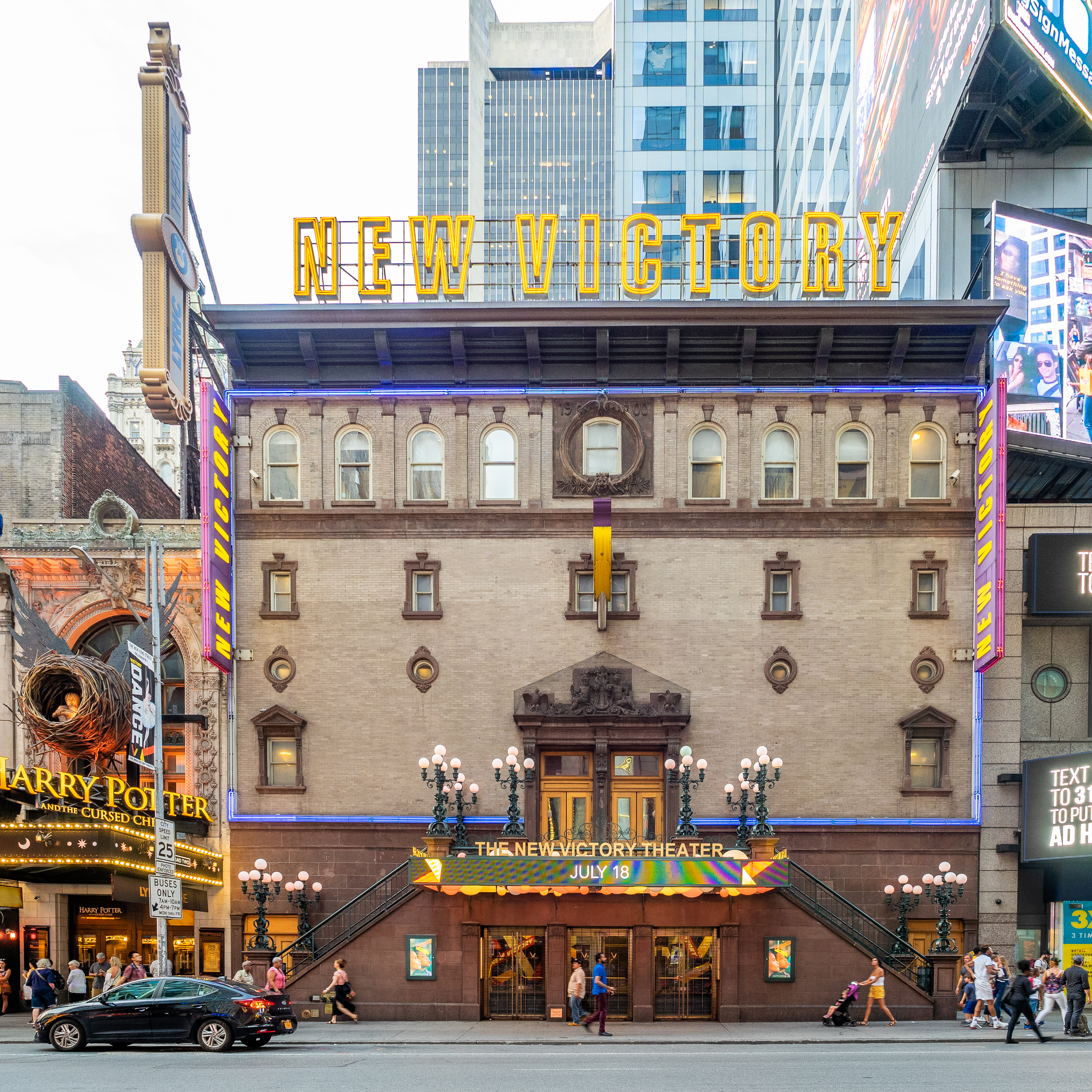
- The New Victory Theater in 2019
- Interactive map of New Victory Theater
- Address: 209 West 42nd Street; Manhattan, New York; United States
- Coordinates: 40°45′23″N 73°59′15″W
- Owner: City and State of New York
- Operator: New 42nd Street
- Capacity: 499
- Type: Theatre for Young Audiences

Construction
- Opened: September 27, 1900 (126 years ago)
- Reopened: December 11, 1995
- Rebuilt: 1994–1995
- Architect: Albert Westover

Tenant
- New 42nd Street

Website
- www.newvictory.org

The New Victory Theater is a theater at 209 West 42nd Street in the Theater District of Midtown Manhattan in New York City, New York, U.S., near Times Square. Built in 1900 as the Republic Theatre (also Theatre Republic), it was designed by Albert Westover and developed by Oscar Hammerstein I as a Broadway theater. The theater has been known by several names over the years, including the Belasco Theatre, Minsky's Burlesque, and the Victory Theatre. The theater is owned by the city and state governments of New York and leased to nonprofit New 42, which has operated the venue as a children's theater since 1995. The New Victory presents theater shows, dance shows, puppet shows, and other types of performance art shows from all around the world.

The New Victory Theater's modern design dates to a 1995 renovation; its facade reflects its appearance in 1900, while the interior incorporates details that were added when David Belasco took over the theater in 1902. The theater has a brick and brownstone facade with a central stoop leading to the second floor. Inside the entrance is a lobby and reception area, as well as a basement with the theater's restrooms, lockers, and concessions. The New Victory Theater's auditorium seats 499 people on three levels, although it originally accommodated over 900 guests. The auditorium is designed in a red-and-gold palette, with green and purple accents, and contains box seats and a decorative domed ceiling. The backstage areas were initially extremely small, but they were expanded into a new wing in 1995.

The theater opened on September 27, 1900, with the play Sag Harbor. Two years later, Belasco leased the theater, renamed it for himself, and completely reconstructed the interior. Although Belasco restored the Republic Theatre name in 1910, he continued to operate it until 1914. A. H. Woods then leased the theater until 1922, when Oliver D. Bailey took over, hosting the play Abie's Irish Rose at the theater for five years. Due to a lack of theatrical productions, Billy Minsky converted the Republic into a burlesque house in 1931, and his family operated it as such until 1942. Afterward, the Republic became a movie theater, the Victory, operated by the Brandt family. The theater became the first adult movie theater on 42nd Street in 1972. New 42 took over the Victory and several neighboring theaters in 1990. Plans for the children's theater were announced in 1993, and Hardy Holzman Pfeiffer Associates restored the theater, which reopened on December 11, 1995, as the New Victory.

== Site ==
The New Victory Theater is at 209 West 42nd Street, on the northern sidewalk between Eighth Avenue and Seventh Avenue, at the southern end of Times Square in the Midtown Manhattan neighborhood of New York City, New York, U.S. The building occupies a rectangular land lot covering 6,942 ft^{2} (644.9 m^{2}), with a frontage of 69 ft (21 m) on 42nd Street and a depth of 100.5 ft (30.6 m). The theater abuts 3 Times Square to the east and northeast, as well as the Lyric Theatre to the west and northwest. It also shares the block with the Hotel Carter building, the Todd Haimes Theatre, and the Times Square Theatre to the west. Other nearby buildings include 255 West 43rd Street, the St. James Theatre, and the Hayes Theater to the northwest; 229 West 43rd Street and 1501 Broadway to the north; 5 Times Square and the New Amsterdam Theatre to the south; and the Candler Building to the southwest.

The surrounding area is part of Manhattan's Theater District and contains many Broadway theaters. In the first two decades of the 20th century, eleven venues for legitimate theatre were built within one block of West 42nd Street between Seventh and Eighth Avenues. The New Amsterdam, Harris, Liberty, Eltinge, and Lew Fields theaters occupied the south side of the street. The original Lyric and Apollo theaters (combined into the current Lyric Theatre), as well as the Times Square, Victory, Selwyn (now Todd Haimes), and Victoria theaters, occupied the north side. These venues were mostly converted to movie theaters by the 1930s, and many of them had been relegated to showing pornography by the 1970s.

== Design ==
The New Victory Theater was designed by architect Albert Westover; its current design dates to a 1995 renovation by Hardy Holzman Pfeiffer Associates (HHPA). The design of the facade reflects its appearance in 1900, when Oscar Hammerstein I developed the theater. The interior design incorporates details that were added when David Belasco took over the theater in 1902. The theater's interior was intended to be completely fireproof, with marble stairways, artificial stone, and plaster surfaces with wire-net lathing.

=== Facade ===
The brick and brownstone facade was inspired by Venetian architecture. When the theater was completed in 1900, the main facade measured 70 ft (21 m) tall and 100 ft (30 m) wide. The New-York Tribune described it as being made of "iron, brownstone, and Powhatan brick". At the front of the theater, a brownstone stoop with two staircases rises from ground level to the second story. Ten wrought-iron street lights decorate the perimeter. The current stoop is a replica of the theater's original stoop, which led to the auditorium's second balcony level; the original lobby was below the original stoop. The original stoop was removed in 1910 before being restored in 1995. The New York City government had to approve the installation of the current stoop because it extends onto the sidewalk of 42nd Street.

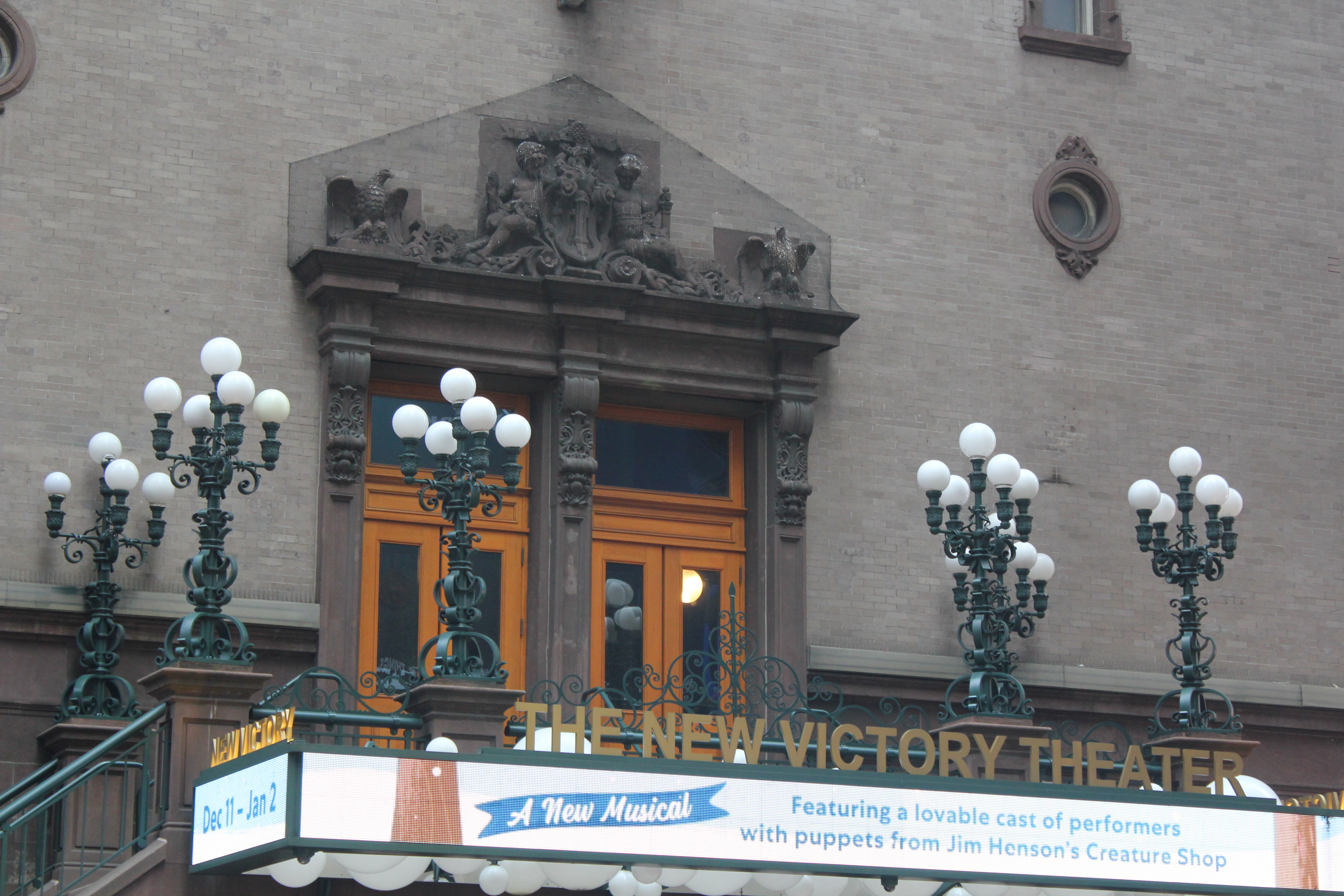
Stoop with cast-iron lighting stanchions

When Belasco renovated the theater in 1902, he installed a wrought iron and glass canopy in front of the entrance, which was also eliminated in 1910. Prior to the New Victory's restoration, there had been an Art Deco-style marquee in front of the entrance, dating from 1932. This was removed in 1995, along with a piece of the neighboring Lyric Theatre's marquee.

Above the cornice of the theater building are capital letters spelling out "New Victory". Although the theater was originally topped by a colonnade with arches, it was not rebuilt in the 1995 restoration. The modern-day "New Victory" sign occupies the site of the former colonnade. The roof of the theater contained the Paradise Roof Garden, an extension of a garden atop the neighboring Victoria Theatre. It operated until about 1914 or 1915. The garden originally consisted of a "Swiss farm", which was replaced with a "Dutch farm" in 1905. According to The New York Times, the "Dutch farm" was a replica of a Dutch village "complete with water mill, a rooftop space where patrons dined and danced".

=== Interior ===
==== Lobby and lounges ====
The theater initially had a small reception area, described by the New-York Tribune as "tomblike", which was replaced with a lobby in 1902. The original lobby had oak panelling and wrought-iron doors to the auditorium, Three doors under the original stoop led to a box office, cab office, check room, and information bureau, and two more doors led to the orchestra-level seats. Two staircases with carved balustrades led from the lobby to the first balcony level. By the 1930s, the lobby had been removed, and the main entrance doors led directly to the theater's orchestra level. When the theater was renovated in 1995, the rearmost rows of seating were removed from the auditorium, creating space for the present lobby. A wall was installed between the auditorium and lobby, reducing disruption caused by noise from the street.

A staircase and an elevator connect the lobby to other stories. The elevator was installed in the mid-1990s. Because there was so little space within the theater, the elevator had to be built within an alleyway at the eastern end of the theater building. The basement contains the theater's restrooms, lockers, and concessions. During the theater's restoration in 1995, part of the underlying bedrock was excavated to make way for the basement. Prior to its restoration, the Victory Theatre had never been equipped with adequate lounges, concessions, or restrooms.

==== Auditorium ====
===== Seating areas =====
The original capacity of the Victory Theatre is unclear, with numbers ranging from to 936 to 1,100 given across various sources, although this has since been reduced to an off-Broadway capacity of 499 seats. (Note: The New Victory does not typically operate as an off-Broadway house.) Seating is across three levels. The decreased capacity reflects the fact that part of the former seating area is occupied by the lobby. In addition, the present-day children's theater did not need a high seating capacity, and modern audiences generally required wider seats. The modern auditorium is a cube measuring around 50 ft (15 m) on each side. When it opened as the Theatre Republic in 1900, the auditorium was decorated in green, white, and gold. Belasco repainted the auditorium red, green, and brown in 1902. The New Victory Theater was repainted in a red-and-gold palette, with green and purple accents, during the 1995 renovation. The modern color palette resembles the color scheme introduced in Belasco's 1902 renovation, with lighter tones.

The seating areas were originally so steeply raked that The New York Times said "the big-hat question", in which some patrons' large hats obstructed other guests' views, "will never be raised in that house". When Belasco replaced the seats in 1902, he installed seat coverings with bee motifs, a reference to his last initial. The modern-day seats are flanked by wrought-iron stanchions, both with bee motifs. The modern seat coverings are similar in design to those that Belasco installed. HHPA created a custom design for the current carpets in 1995; the original carpets could not be restored due to a lack of documentation.

The auditorium is decorated with woodwork and plaster decorations, which resemble the original decorations in the theater. The auditorium was gilded extensively; the gilding was covered in 1902, before HHPA restored the gilding in 1995. The modern-day decorations consist of motifs such as fleurs-de-lis and laurels, which are made of glazed Dutch metal. At the rear of the second balcony level are control booths. The rear wall of the orchestra and first balcony level, as well as the control booths on the second balcony level, contain sound-absorbing acoustical panels. In addition, the entrance from the lobby and the auditorium's emergency exits have soundproof doors. When Belasco owned the theater, he had installed autumn-themed tapestries on the rear and side walls of the auditorium. He also placed a rosewood partition at the rear of the auditorium. Behind this screen was originally a men's smoking room, as well as one women's lounge on each of the three levels. These rooms were outfitted with then-modern amenities such as telephones and carriage calls.

There are triple-height boxes flanking the stage, above which are golden domes. Originally, there were two boxes on either side of the stage at the orchestra and first balcony levels, while there was one box on either side at the second balcony level. The boxes are topped by lighting fixtures, similar to those that had been installed when Belasco owned the theater. On the ceiling is a large dome that features lyre-playing putti perched on its rim; these putti were removed in 1902 before being restored in 1995. The dome is divided by ribs, with a central motif of a lyre and cherubs at the intersection of the ribs. Its glazed surface is painted amber and ocher. The dome includes an LED chandelier and uplights, as well as ventilation openings. Above the auditorium is the theater's heating, ventilation, and air conditioning equipment; to minimize vibrations, the HVAC equipment is mounted on girders spanning the auditorium's ceiling.

===== Other design features =====
The proscenium arch in front of the stage is ocher with gold highlights, while the stage curtain is rose-colored. As built, the proscenium arch measured 35 ft (11 m) across and was ornately decorated. The top of the arch was decorated with a golden lyre, flanked by figures representing harmony and melody. When the theater opened, the proscenium arch was topped by a balcony for musicians, since there was no orchestra pit at the orchestra level of seating. The balcony was removed in 1902. During that renovation, an orchestra pit was placed in front of the stage, with platforms at different heights. It was expanded and deepened during the 1995 renovation.

The sprung floor stage measures 31 by 65 ft (9.4 by 19.8 m). For most of the 20th century, the stage lacked sufficient wing space and was relatively small, measuring only 33 by 32 ft (10.1 by 9.8 m). In 1902, Belasco added three dressing rooms and a greenroom backstage, as well as traps and a stage elevator. The stage elevator, measuring 15 by 30 ft (4.6 by 9.1 m) across, formed much of the surface of the stage itself and required excavation into the underlying bedrock. In addition, there were footlights in front of the stage. The current configuration of the stage dates to 1995, when dressing rooms on the auditorium's stage were demolished to make way for expanded wing space. The stage area contains 276 dimmers and 300 lights in total, and the fly system consists of 30 sets of counterweights. The counterweight system replaced an older system that used sandbags.

==== Backstage area ====
Originally, the Victory Theatre was surrounded on all sides by other buildings, and it had neither backstage areas nor a stage door. During the 1995 renovation, the New Victory Theater organization acquired two low-rise tenement buildings on 43rd Street. One of the wings was demolished to make way for a loading dock. The other building was preserved and converted into a dressing room wing. The rear wing includes 40 dressing rooms, as well as a wardrobe room, green room, security office, and offices for visiting theatre companies. During the development of the adjacent 3 Times Square in 1998, the Rudin family acquired the loading dock and demolished it. The Rudins constructed loading docks within 3 Times Square, reserving one loading dock for the New Victory.

== History ==
Times Square became the epicenter for large-scale theater productions between 1900 and the Great Depression. Manhattan's theater district had begun to shift from Union Square and Madison Square during the first decade of the 20th century. From 1901 to 1920, forty-three theaters were built around Broadway in Midtown Manhattan. These included the New Victory Theater, which over the years has been known as Theatre Republic, Belasco Theatre, and Victory Theatre.

=== Early history ===
George M. Jansen filed plans with the New York City Department of Buildings for a music hall and cafe at 207–211 West 42nd Street, to be designed by John E. Kerby, in June 1899. It would have been three stories tall with a raised basement and would have cost $200,000. Had the theater been built, it would have contained a Moorish-style auditorium with three balconies. That December Oscar Hammerstein I filed revised plans for a theater, at the same site, to be known as the Republic. The structure would be built at a cost of $200,000 and would complement Hammerstein's Victoria Theatre next door. By constructing the Republic, Hammerstein could extend the roof garden atop the Victoria to the new theater.

==== 1900s ====
The Theatre Republic opened on September 27, 1900, with James Herne's play Sag Harbor, starring Lionel Barrymore. It was the third theater built on this block of West 42nd Street, as well as the seventh theater developed by Hammerstein. The New-York Tribune called the Republic a "small but prettily arranged house". The theater hosted three additional plays during its inaugural season, including In the Palace of the King, which featured Viola Allen for four months. The theater was relatively small, so it could only accommodate dramas and comedies. During the theater's 1901–1902 season, the venue was rented out to producers, who presented such shows as Under Southern Skies, The Happy Hypocrite, and Mistress Nell.

Theatrical operator David Belasco agreed in January 1902 to lease the Republic from Hammerstein, (Note: Sources disagree over whether the lease ran for 10 or 15 years. The 10-year claim is bolstered by the fact that Belasco was hired to manage the theater for five years, but he had an option to extend the lease for another five years.) after the latter had visited Belasco's Carnegie Hall office to lament that "the Theatrical Syndicate is trying to crush me out of business". Belasco planned to present productions starring silent-film actress Mrs. Leslie Carter. Belasco filed plans for major renovations to both the auditorium and the stage, and he took over the theater in April 1902. He hired the firm of Bigelow, Wallis & Cotton to conduct the renovations, and he hired Rudolph Allen as the interior designer. Belasco initially planned to spend only $15,000 to $20,000, but he eventually gutted the entire interior, spending $150,000. The stage and auditorium were entirely reconstructed, and a basement was excavated underneath the stage to accommodate trap doors and the stage elevator. Belasco also built apartments for himself and for Mrs. Carter above the auditorium. As workers were excavating an area under the stage, they hit a spring by mistake, flooding the site. Belasco's assistant, Louis Hartmann, convinced him to add a laboratory directly above the dome to test out lighting and stage effects.

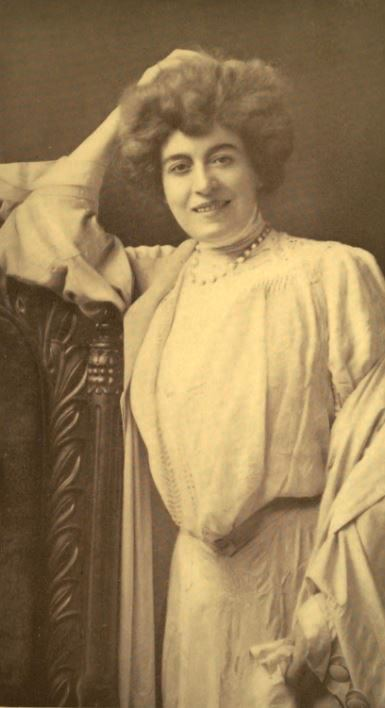
Mrs. Leslie Carter, who starred in many of the Belasco Theatre's shows

Belasco renamed the theater after himself, and it reopened on September 29, 1902, with the play Du Barry featuring Mrs. Carter. One of the renovated theater's early successes was Belasco's play The Darling of the Gods, which opened in December 1902 and lasted for 182 performances. Belasco's play Sweet Kitty Bellairs opened at the theater in December 1903, running for more than 300 performances, followed by The Music Master the next year. The theater's other plays included The Girl of the Golden West in 1905; The Rose of the Rancho in 1906; (Note: The Girl of the Golden West had another engagement in 1907, and The Rose of the Rancho also ran during the 1907–1908 season.) The Warrens of Virginia in 1907; and The Devil in 1909. Although Belasco was involved in many of these productions, the extent of his involvement varied widely. George Arliss, Cecil B. DeMille, Mary Pickford, and Tyrone Power Sr. were among the other actors who appeared at the Belasco in its early years. By 1906, Belasco was unsure whether he would be able to renew his lease on his namesake theater, so he decided to develop the Stuyvesant Theatre on 44th Street, incorporating many of the innovations that he had developed at the 42nd Street theater.

==== 1910s ====
Belasco's lease was again scheduled for renewal in 1910, and he renamed the theater yet again that July. The 42nd Street theater became the Republic, while the 44th Street theater became the Belasco. The renamed theater's first production was Bobby Burnit, which opened in August 1910. The New York City government announced the same year that it would widen 42nd Street, requiring that the Republic Theatre's stoop be demolished. Around that time, Hammerstein also indicated his intent to sell the theater. The Republic hosted the plays Rebecca of Sunnybrook Farm in 1910, The Woman in 1911, and The Governor's Lady in 1912; all of these shows lasted for several months. In January 1914, Belasco leased the Republic to the Universal Film Company for use as a cinema. Hammerstein, who feared that people would boycott the theater, sued Belasco, claiming that the lease only permitted Belasco to use the theater for "first-class theatrical performances".

Hammerstein won his lawsuit against Belasco and Universal in March 1914, prompting Belasco to give up his lease. A. H. Woods leased the Republic Theatre at the end of that month. Woods's first production at the theater was The High Cost of Loving, which opened that August. Cleves Kinkead's Common Clay opened at the theater in 1915, running for over 300 performances, and Clare Kummer's play Good Gracious, Annabelle was staged at the Republic the next year. Afterward, Woods began to lease out the theater, as he could not produce all of these shows by himself. Among the Republic's plays in 1917 were Jane Cowl and Jane Murfin's Lilac Time, John N. Raphael's Peter Ibbetson, and Lou Tellegen and Willard Mack's Blind Youth. Woods also produced Parlor, Bedroom and Bath, which ran at the theater for 232 performances from 1917 to 1918, and A Voice in the Dark, which had 134 performances in 1919.

==== 1920s ====
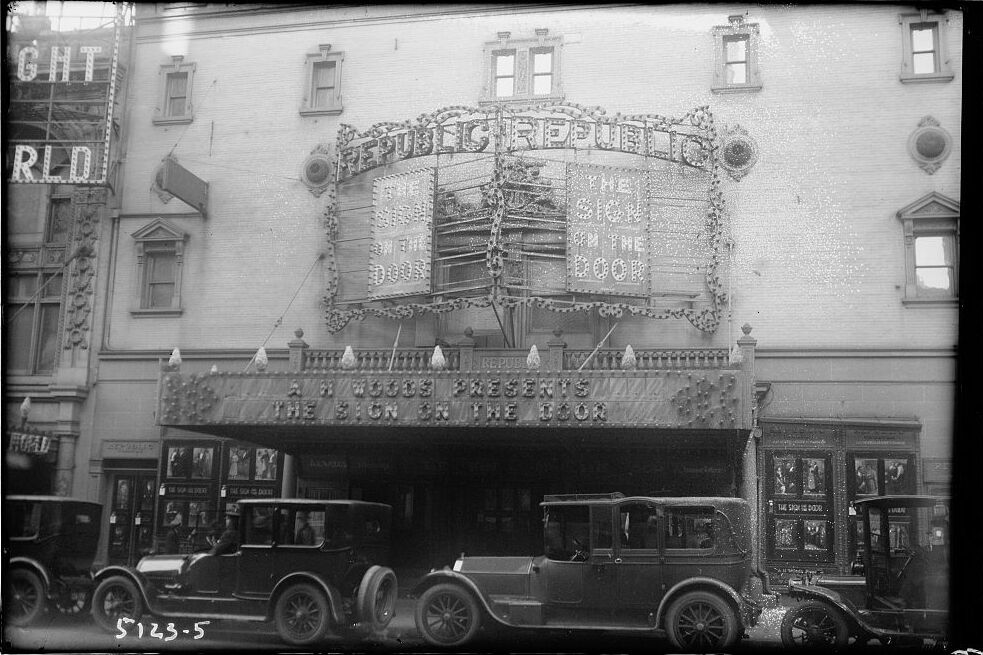
The marquee as seen in 1920

The Republic presented a long-running transfer of the play Enter Madame in 1921, as well as the farce Getting Gertie's Garter and the comedy The Fair Circassian later the same year. Meanwhile, after Oscar Hammerstein had died in 1921, his son Arthur Hammerstein and two of Arthur's sisters sued their stepmother Emma Smith for control of the Republic Theatre and Manhattan Opera House. A judge subsequently determined that the theater had belonged to Arthur since 1910.

Oliver D. Bailey leased the theater in July 1922, with plans to present Theatre Guild productions there, and he relocated the play Abie's Irish Rose to the Republic from the nearby Fulton Theatre. Abie's Irish Rose ultimately ran for 2,327 performances through October 1927, becoming the longest-running Broadway show at the time, a record that it held for six years. After Abie's Irish Rose closed, several producers leased the theater in the hope that they would also be able to present a long-running play. Bailey also produced several Theatre Guild shows, such as a rendition of the play Porgy that had transferred from the Guild Theatre. One of the Republic's more successful shows in the late 1920s was My Girl Friday, with 253 performances in 1929. With the onset of the Great Depression in 1930, many Broadway theaters were impacted by declining attendance. The theater's last play was Pressing Business, which premiered in November 1930 for a month-long run.

=== Burlesque and movies ===
Bailey gave up his lease on the theater in December 1930, and Arthur Hammerstein announced plans to present talking films at the Republic. By then, the Depression had made it extremely difficult for theater owners to continue presenting legitimate shows. The Republic Amusement Corporation operated the theater for one month, presenting short films continuously and selling tickets for 25 cents.

==== Conversion to burlesque ====
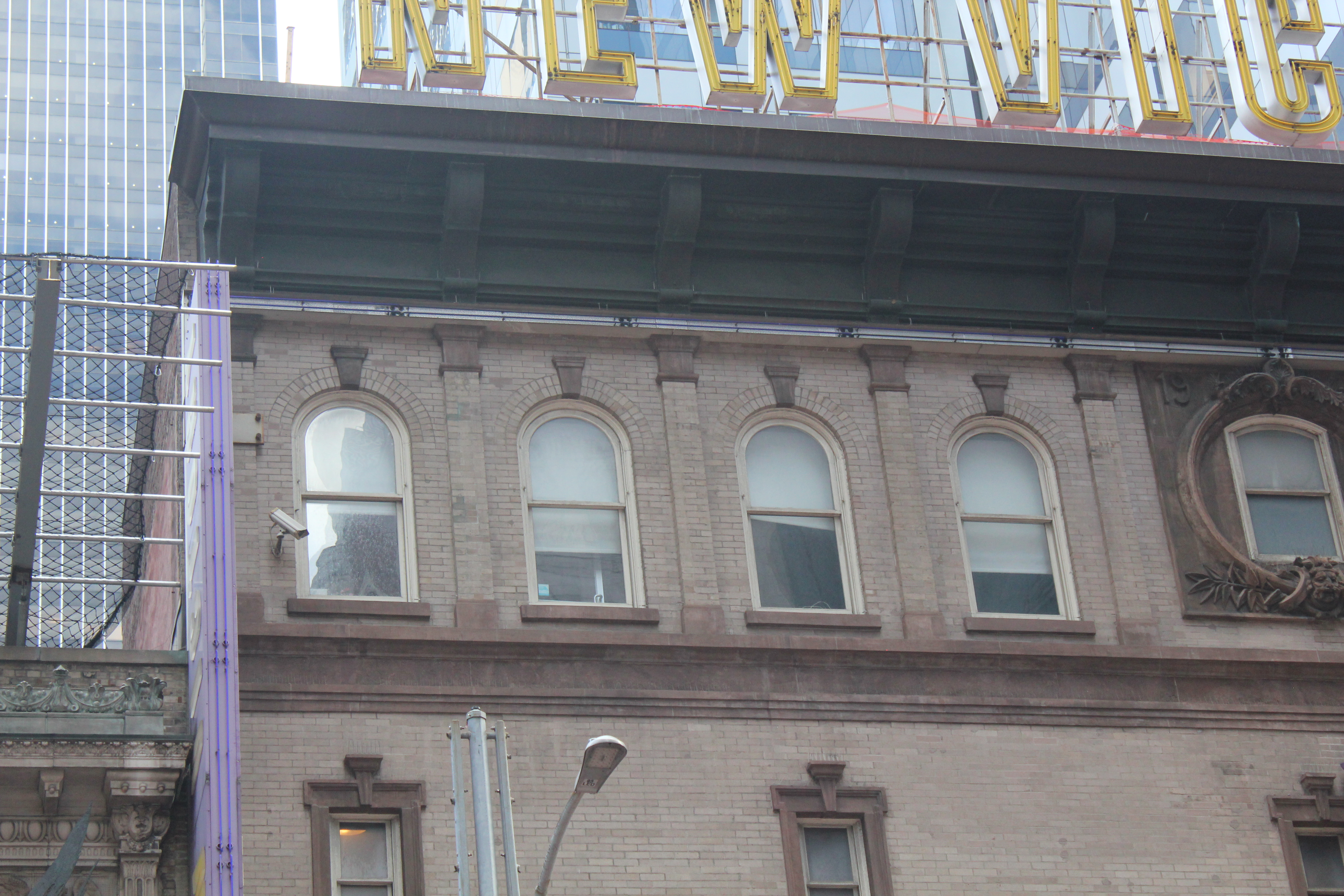
Detail of the upper facade

Billy Minsky, treasurer of the Holly Holding Company, leased the Republic in January 1931 with plans to present burlesque shows there. Joseph Weinstock would finance the conversion of the theater into a burlesque house, and Minsky installed two runways for his performers. The theater reopened as a burlesque house on February 12, 1931, becoming the first burlesque venue on 42nd Street. The venue, known as Minsky's Burlesque, presented performances with such titles as "Panties Inferno" and "Mind Over Mattress". The theater presented two shows a day: in the morning and in the afternoon. The burlesque performances were several times cheaper than legitimate Broadway shows such as George White's Scandals. Each show consisted of a skit, the main burlesque performance, and a dance or comedy act. Performers included Gypsy Rose Lee, Ann Corio, Margie Hart, and Georgia Sothern.

The nearby Eltinge and Apollo theaters were converted into burlesque houses shortly after the Republic reopened, and the Republic was financially successful by mid-1931. After Minsky died in 1932, his siblings continued to operate the theater as a burlesque. Local business owners opposed burlesque, claiming that the shows encouraged loitering and decreased property values. In New York, theater licenses were subject to yearly renewal, and opponents of burlesque tried to get the theaters' licenses revoked. The police conducted raids on the Republic as early as April 1931, arresting managers and some of the performers for public indecency, but these actions only boosted the theaters' popularity. The Republic's operating license was temporarily revoked in September 1932, although the theater reopened the next month. The Republic temporarily stopped showing burlesque every time it was raided; the managers reinstated the shows after a short while, when officials' attention was diverted elsewhere.

After he was elected mayor in 1934, Fiorello La Guardia began cracking down on burlesque and appointed Paul Moss as license commissioner. Even so, the Republic continued to operate as a burlesque house for several more years. Moss revoked the Republic's operating license again in September 1935, but the New York Court of Appeals overturned his revocation. After a series of sex crimes in early 1937, the La Guardia administration ordered all burlesque houses to remove the word "burlesque" from their marquees that June. The Republic continued to host burlesque performances, which were billed as variety shows. Even without burlesque on its marquee, the Republic remained popular, although it was only one of three remaining burlesque theaters in the city by 1940. The Republic's manager claimed in 1940 that the theater had lost millions of dollars after the marquee stopped advertising burlesque. Moss again refused to renew the Republic's operating license in early 1942, marking the permanent end of burlesque at the Republic.

==== Movie theater and decline ====
By May 1942, the Republic had become a newsreel theater. Shortly afterward, it was renamed the Victory Theatre, in honor of American soldiers fighting in World War II. The Brandt family acquired the Victory in 1944 and began operating it as a "grind house", showing movies from dawn to dusk. By the mid-1940s, the ten theaters along 42nd Street between Seventh and Eighth Avenues were all showing movies; this led Variety to call the block the "biggest movie center of the world". The Brandt family operated seven of these theaters, while the Cinema circuit operated the other three. The Brandt theaters included the Selwyn, Apollo, Times Square, Lyric, and Victory theaters on the north side of 42nd Street, as well as the Eltinge and Liberty theaters on the south side. The Victory Theater showed horror and exploitation films. Several producers offered to stage legitimate productions in the Brandt theaters, but none of the offers were successful.

William Brandt indicated in 1946 that he might replace the theaters on the north side of 42nd Street with a skyscraper. By then, there was a shortage of new films in the theaters along 42nd Street, which led to decreased attendance. Later the same year, the Brandt family received a mortgage loan for the Victory Theatre. They also bought the theater building from the Geisha Realty Company for $402,000; previously, the Brandts had leased the theater from Geisha. The Brandts continued to operate the theater in the hope that 42nd Street's reputation would improve. William Brandt said in 1953 that any of his 42nd Street theaters could be converted to a legitimate house within 24 hours' notice, but producers did not take up his offer. By the late 1950s, the Victory was operating as a grindhouse, displaying exploitation and horror films. Tickets cost 25 to 65 cents apiece, the cheapest admission scale for any theater on 42nd Street. The Times Square and the other 42nd Street theaters operated from 8 a.m. to 3 a.m., with three shifts of workers. The ten theaters on the block attracted about five million visitors a year between them.

The 42nd Street Company was established in 1961 to operate the Brandts' seven theaters on 42nd Street. By the early 1960s, the surrounding block had decayed, but many of the old theater buildings from the block's heyday remained, including the Victory. The theater became the first on 42nd Street to exhibit pornographic films in 1970. The city government quickly started cracking down on adult theaters, forcing the Victory's managers to change the theater's marquee and withdraw shows under threat of arrest. Martin Levine and Richard Brandt took over the 42nd Street Company in 1972. At the time, the Victory was showing porn and "a mixed bag of other films". The other six theaters showed a variety of genres, though Levine said none of the company's 42nd Street theaters showed hardcore porn. The Brandts' theaters had a combined annual gross of about $2 million and operated nearly the entire day. However, the area was in decline; the Brandts' theaters only had three million visitors by 1977, about half of the number in 1963.

=== Restoration ===
==== Preservation attempts ====
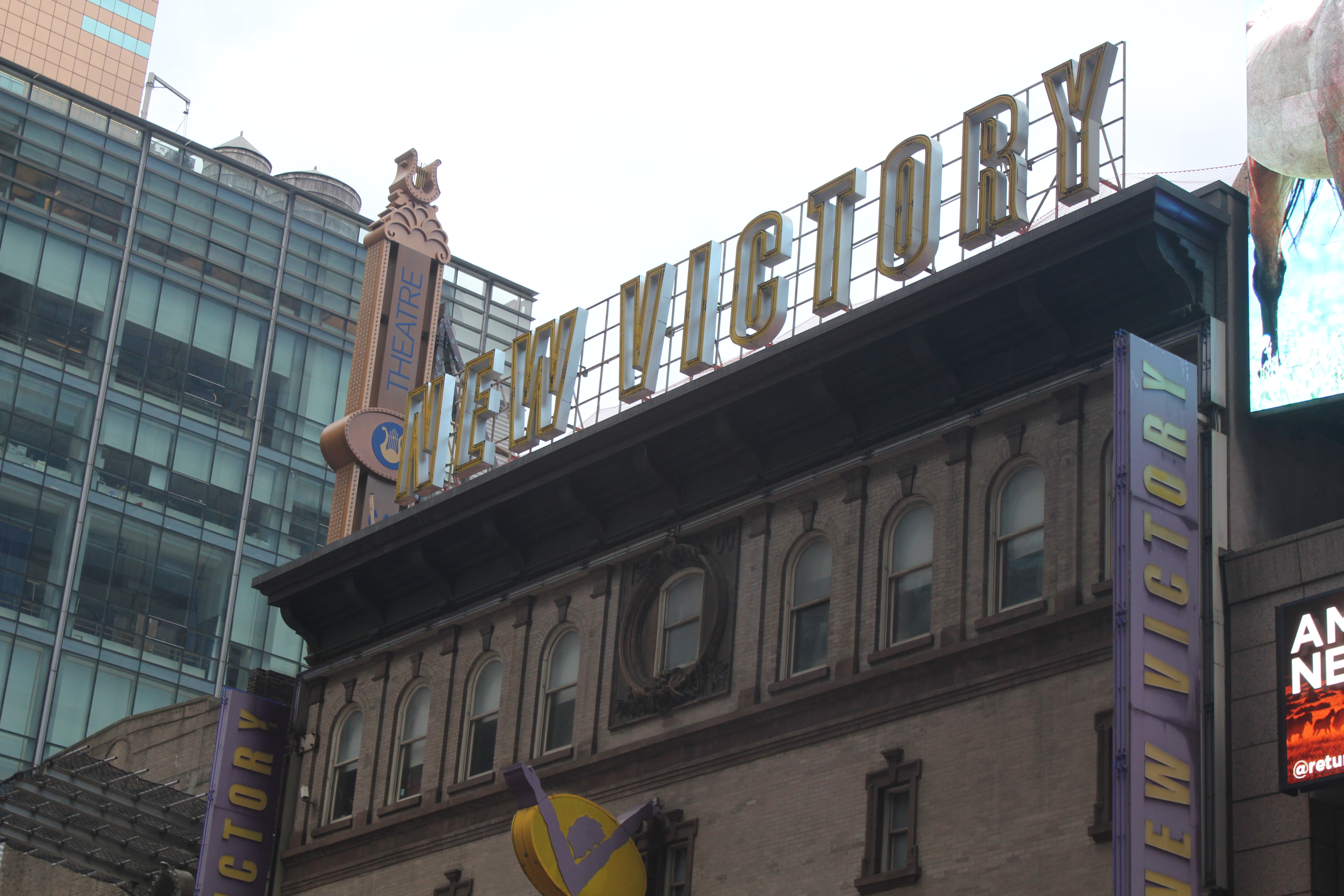
Signage atop the theater

The 42nd Street Development Corporation had been formed in 1976 to discuss plans for redeveloping Times Square. The same year, the City University of New York's Graduate Center hosted an exhibition with photographs of the Victory and other theaters to advocate for the area's restoration. One plan for the site, in 1978, called for restoring the Victory as a legitimate theater while razing nearby buildings to create a park. Another plan, called the City at 42nd Street, was announced in December 1979 as part of a proposal to restore West 42nd Street around Times Square. Under the plan, the Victory Theatre would be restored as a legitimate theater. Mayor Ed Koch wavered in his support of the plan, criticizing it as a "Disneyland on 42nd Street". Subsequently, Hugh Hardy conducted a report on 42nd Street's theaters in 1980. His report, in conjunction with a movement opposing the demolition of the nearby Helen Hayes and Morosco theaters, motivated the New York City Landmarks Preservation Commission (LPC) to survey fifty of Midtown Manhattan's extant theaters in the early 1980s.

The LPC started to consider protecting theaters, including the Victory Theatre, as landmarks in 1982, with discussions continuing over the next several years. While the LPC granted landmark status to many Broadway theaters starting in 1987, it deferred decisions on the exterior and interior of the Victory Theatre. Further discussion of the landmark designations was delayed for several decades. In late 2015, the LPC hosted public hearings on whether to designate the Victory and five other theaters as landmarks. The LPC rejected the designations in February 2016 because the theaters were already subject to historic-preservation regulations set by the state government.

==== Redevelopment proposals ====
The Urban Development Corporation (UDC), an agency of the New York state government, proposed redeveloping the area around a portion of West 42nd Street in 1981. The plan centered around four towers that were to be built at 42nd Street's intersections with Broadway and Seventh Avenue, developed by Park Tower Realty and the Prudential Insurance Company of America. (Note: The sites were: Northwest corner of 42nd Street and Seventh Avenue: now 3 Times Square; Northeast corner of 42nd Street and Broadway: now 4 Times Square; Southwest corner of 42nd Street and Seventh Avenue: now 5 Times Square; South side of 42nd Street between Seventh Avenue and Broadway: now 7 Times Square (Times Square Tower)) It was delayed for several years due to lawsuits and disputes concerning the towers. Meanwhile, by the mid-1980s, the adult-film industry had begun to decline, resulting in fewer films being screened at the Victory Theatre. Even so, it was the oldest theater in Manhattan to have continuously operated as such. The Victory still retained some of its early-20th-century architectural detail, such as cherubs, gold-leaf decorations, and trapdoors. The Brandts also leased all their movie theaters on 42nd Street, including the Victory, to the Cine 42nd Street Corporation in 1986.

From 1987 to 1989, Park Tower and Prudential hired Robert A. M. Stern to conduct a study on the Apollo, Lyric, Selwyn (later American Airlines), Times Square, and Victory theaters on the north side of 42nd Street. Stern devised three alternatives for the five theaters. Stern presented a model of his plan in October 1988. The plan called for erecting a roof garden above the Times Square and Victory theaters, though it was unclear what would have happened with the Victory's interior. Meanwhile, a committee of theatrical experts recommended in 1987 that the Victory and Liberty theaters be restored for nonprofit use; they estimated that it would cost between $6.6 million and $7.7 million to renovate the Victory. City and state officials announced plans for the five theaters, along with the Liberty Theatre on the south side of 42nd Street, in September 1988. The UDC opened a request for proposals for the six theaters that October. The Liberty and Victory were to be converted into performing-arts venues for nonprofit organizations, while the Selwyn, Apollo, Lyric, and Times Square were to be converted to commercial use. By the end of the year, the plans were threatened by a lack of money.

In early 1989, several dozen nonprofit theater companies submitted plans to the UDC for the takeover of six theaters. Most of the bids were for the Liberty and Victory, but the Selwyn, Apollo, Lyric, and Times Square theaters received 13 bids between them. That year, The Durst Organization acquired the leases to eight theaters in Times Square, including the Victory. It subsequently announced plans to renovate the eight theaters in February 1990. The New York state government acquired the theater sites that April via eminent domain. The city had planned to buy out the theaters' leases but withdrew after the 42nd Street Company indicated it would lease the theaters to another developer. Although Durst protested the move, a New York Supreme Court judge ruled that the sites could be acquired by condemnation. A nonprofit organization, New 42nd Street, was formed in September 1990 to restore six of the theaters and find uses for them. Government officials hoped that development of the theaters would finally allow the construction of the four towers around 42nd Street, Broadway, and Seventh Avenue. In 1992, New 42nd Street received $18.2 million for restoring the six theaters as part of an agreement with Prudential and Park Tower.

==== Off-Broadway use and renovation ====
The Victory began offering plays by non-profit companies in the early 1990s, although it was still dilapidated. The Victory staged its first legitimate play in six decades, the En Garde Arts company's production of Mac Wellman's play Crowbar, in early 1990; the audience sat on the stage and the performers ran around the auditorium. Later that year, the Actors' Equity Association said that the Victory could host the off-off-Broadway show Stealing Souls (Bring Your Camera), marking the first time that Actors' Equity had approved an off-off-Broadway show at a Broadway-sized theater. The Theatre for a New Audience staged Shakespeare's Romeo and Juliet at the theater in January 1991. That September, André Gregory relocated his rehearsals of the play Uncle Vanya to the Victory; he relocated the rehearsals to the New Amsterdam Theatre in 1992. Organizations such as the National Music Theatre Network used the Victory for workshops and stage readings. The theater was also used as a filming location, including for the film Manhattan Murder Mystery, a video by the band The Black Crowes, and a video for Sophie B. Hawkins's song "Damn I Wish I Was Your Lover".

As plans for the redevelopment of 42nd Street progressed, several critics lamented the fact that the Victory and other theaters on the block were no longer showing adult movies. New 42nd Street decided to convert the Victory into a space for live performances, and it erected a sidewalk shed in front of the theater in July 1993, before renovation plans were even finalized. New 42nd Street announced in October 1993 that the Victory would become a children's theater called the New Victory. HHPA was hired to renovate the theater for $7.9 million. Fisher/Dachs Associates was hired as the theater designer, Fisher Maranz Renfro Stone was the lighting consultant, and Jaffe Holden Scarborough Associates was the acoustic engineer. The Victory was the first theater restored by New 42nd Street; this was a deliberate choice, as the Victory had been the earliest of 42nd Street's theaters to become an adult movie theater. By converting the Victory into a children's theater, New 42nd Street wished to prove that the theaters on the block were "viable", as well as to fill a gap in the theatre industry.

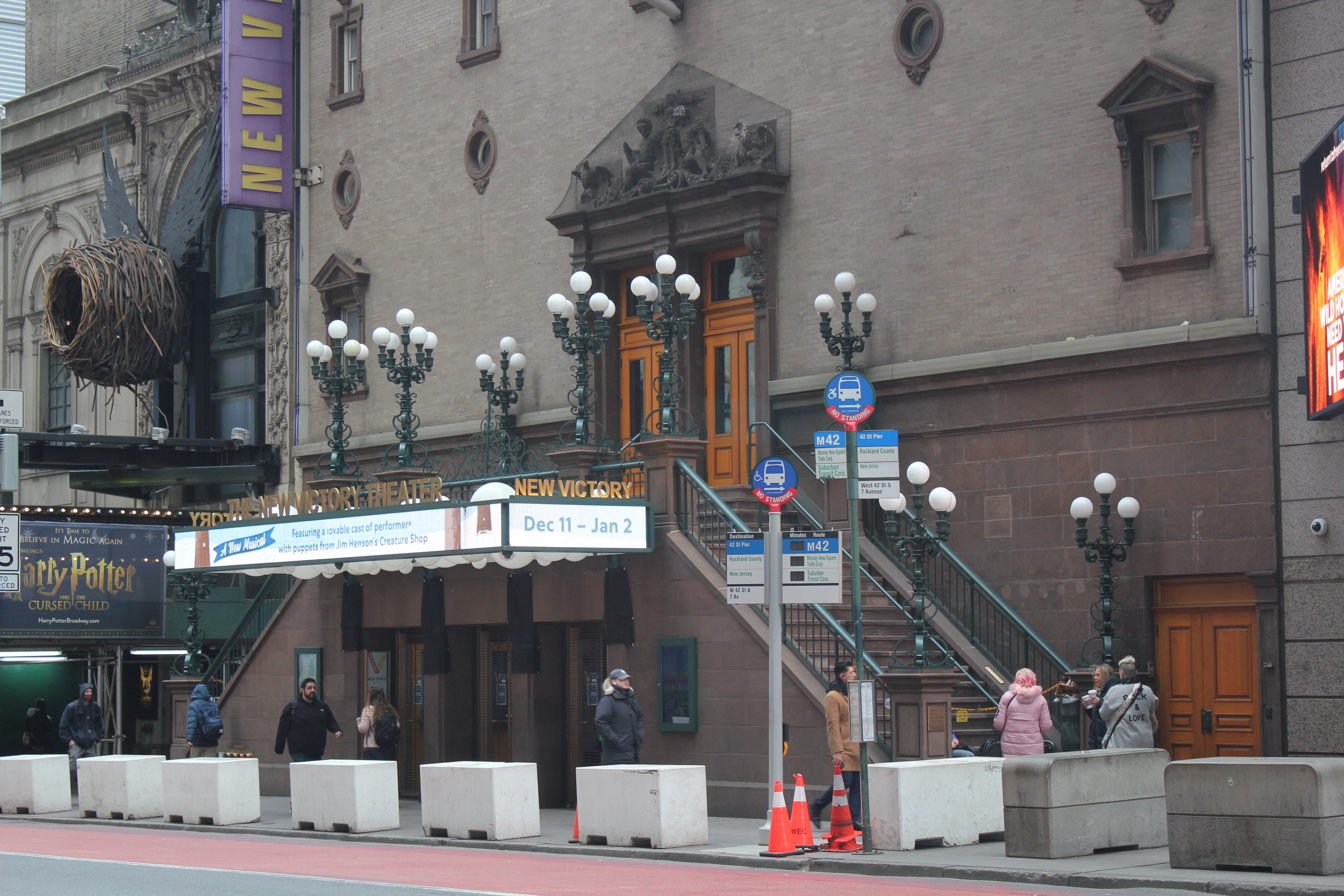
The main entrance stoop, restored in 1995

Officials attended a groundbreaking ceremony for the renovation on May 17, 1994. The cost of the project had increased to $9.2 million at the time of the groundbreaking. HHPA chose to restore the early-20th-century design so it could be easily converted to present shows for adults if the children's theater failed. The restoration included rebuilding the original exterior double staircase and returning the rest of the theater to the way it looked during the Belasco era. In addition, the backstage areas were expanded into two existing buildings on 43rd Street. The project's cost increased still further to $11.4 million by late 1995. Following the New Victory Theater's restoration, companies such as Disney and Livent quickly leased 42nd Street's other theaters.

=== Children's theater ===
On December 11, 1995, the refurbished theater reopened as the New Victory Theater, becoming the city's first off-Broadway theater for kids and families. The theater hosted its first public show a week later, when the French-Canadian troupe Cirque Éloize performed there. At the time of the New Victory's reopening, the surrounding block of 42nd Street was being redeveloped rapidly, although there were still seven adult stores on the block. Back Stage magazine said the New Victory's restoration was "boldly leading the way to the rebirth of 42nd Street as a cultural mecca". TCI magazine said the theater's restoration proved that "Broadway's tarnished jewel boxes-even those languishing as porno houses-can be saved to support the legitimate theatre". For its restoration of the New Victory Theater, HHPA won the American Institute of Architects's 1997 honor award for interior spaces.

The theater's initial season included acts such as Theatre for a New Audience, Urban Bush Women, and the Metropolitan Opera Guild, as well as film series. Newsday described the initial shows as including "football, a storytelling festival, comedy acts and hip-hop dance events". During the late 1990s, the theater hosted adaptations of shows such as Peter and Wendy, The Wind in the Willows, and It Ain't Nothin' But the Blues. The New Victory was more successful than predicted, filling 85 percent of its seats in the 1996–1997 season and selling thousands of memberships to families. Cora Cahan, who headed New 42nd Street, said the New Victory's success proved that there was a "real need" for children's theaters in New York City. The theater continued to present family-friendly shows, including those by foreign artists, through the late 1990s and the 2000s.

By the 2000s, the theater was also hosting a variety of dance productions, including classical ballet, hip-hop dance, and modern routines. Compared with theatrical productions, which were often produced or adapted specifically for children, the dance productions were more difficult to adapt to younger audiences. The New Victory Theater renamed its lobby after its primary donor, LuEsther Mertz, in 2003. Two years later, the New Victory Theater launched the New Vic at the Duke, a series of teenagers' plays presented at the neighboring The Duke on 42nd Street. The Arts Education Network, operated by Americans for the Arts, gave the New Victory Theatre an Arts Education Award in 2008. By then, the theater's programming director Mary Rose Lloyd was also planning to host shows for infants and toddlers.

The New Victory established a new work development program called LabWorks in 2012, and the theater received a special Drama Desk Award the same year. The theater also started providing free dance performances for local students in 2014 as part of the Victory Dance program. The theater's lower lobbies were renovated in 2017. The New Victory was closed temporarily in 2020 due to the COVID-19 pandemic in the United States. During the pandemic, it continued to host children's and family shows online which were also broadcast on WNET's Camp TV and Let's Learn.

== Operations ==
The New Victory Theater is operated by New 42nd Street. The New Victory's shows are largely intended for children up to 17 years old. Since 2019, Russell Granet has served as the theater's president and chief executive officer. In addition, as of 2022, Mary Rose Lloyd is the artistic director.

When the New Victory opened in 1995, it operated an education program on weekdays for students who attended public and private schools in the city. The New Victory Theater also offered apprenticeships for high school and college students who lived in the city. These apprenticeships, funded by a scholarship grant, originally ran for 10 to 12 weeks and trained students to be ushers. In addition to the apprenticeship and education programs, the theater operates the Usher Corps, training high-school students to be ushers. In 2014, the New Victory was awarded by the President's Committee on the Arts and the Humanities with the National Arts and Humanities Youth Program Award for the usher program. The New Victory also operates LabWorks, a program in which performers and other artists can receive rehearsal space and subsidies. Since 2021, the New Victory has also operated LabWorks Launch, in which a LabWorks artist is selected to develop their work further and present it at the theater.

To attract audiences, the theater sold tickets at relatively inexpensive prices (originally capped at $25); by comparison, tickets for the average Broadway plays or musicals could be four to five times as expensive. The New Victory also offered annual memberships for families. About 900 families bought memberships in the New Victory's first season of operation, while 3,600 more families became members in its second season.

== Notable productions ==
Productions are listed by the year of their first performance. This list only includes theatrical productions; other live shows and movies at the theater are not listed.

=== Broadway ===
Notable productions at the theater
Opening year	Name	Refs.
1900	Sag Harbor	
1901	Under Southern Skies	
1902	The Happy Hypocrite	
1902	The Notorious Mrs. Ebbsmith	
1902	Mistress Nell	
1902	As You Like It	
1903	Sweet Kitty Bellairs	
1904	The Music Master	
1905	Zaza	
1905	The Girl of the Golden West	
1907	The Warrens of Virginia	
1908	The Devil	
1910	Rebecca of Sunnybrook Farm	
1911	The Woman	
1912	The Governor's Lady	
1913	A Good Little Devil	
1914	Kick In	
1915	Common Clay	
1916	Good Gracious, Annabelle	
1917	Lilac Time	
1917	Peter Ibbetson	
1917	Blind Youth	
1918	Roads of Destiny	
1919	The Fortune Teller	
1919	The Sign on the Door	
1921	Enter Madame	
1921	Getting Gertie's Garter	
1921	The Fair Circassian	
1922	Lawful Larceny	
1922	Abie's Irish Rose	

=== Off-Broadway ===
Notable productions at the theater
Opening year	Name	Refs.
1995	Cirque Eloize	
1996	The Green Bird	
1997	Two Gentlemen of Verona	
1997	Peter and Wendy	
1998	The Wind in the Willows	
1999	It Ain't Nothin' But the Blues	
1999	Shockheaded Peter	
2003	A Midsummer Night's Dream	
2011	Cymbeline	
2014	Three Little Birds	
2014	Measure for Measure	

== See also ==
- List of Broadway theaters#Existing former Broadway theaters
