= Don the Talking Dog =

German performing dog (1905–1915)

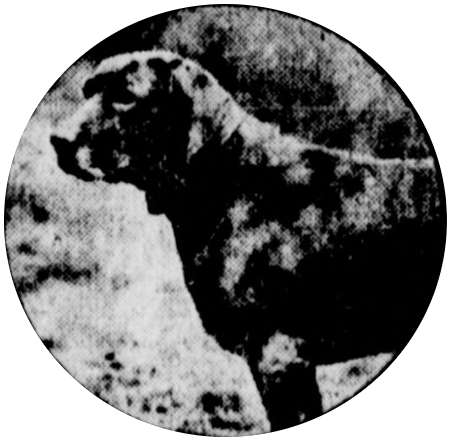
Don the Talking Dog, image published in The Evening World, 10 July 1912

Don the Talking Dog (1905–1915) was a popular vaudeville act in the early 20th century. Don was raised in Theerhütte, Germany, by Martin Ebers and Martha Haberland. His breed is unconfirmed – reports state that he was a German hunting dog, either a setter or a pointer. Don was credited with being able to vocalise eight German words, including haben (“have”), Kuchen (“cake”), Hunger (“hunger”), and his own name. Don also learned to say ja (“yes”), nein (“no”), and Ruhe (“quiet” or “rest”) along with the name of his owner and his owner's fiancé. In April 1911 The Salt Lake Tribune reported that Don had been examined by “a number of the most eminent zoologists” and that they had declared him “a genuine prodigy”. The journal Science reported in May 1912 that Don's ability to speak was more down to “the production of sounds which produce illusions in the hearer”. Either way he was described in the 11 December 1910 edition of The New York Times as an “uncommonly intelligent animal”.

Animal acts were particularly popular as entertainment in the United States at the turn of the 18th and 19th centuries and Don is highlighted as being a particular “sensation” in his native Germany. Greg Daugherty of the Smithsonian Institution wrote that “no animal act seemed to get as much notice as Don the Talking Dog” in a 2018 retrospective. Don is said to have started talking when Ebers asked him from the supper table „Willst du wohl was haben?“ (“You want something don't you?”) and Don clearly responded "haben" (want).

Vaudeville impresario Willie Hammerstein was keen to replicate the dog's success by bringing him to the United States. He publicised the venture by paying a $50,000 bond, equivalent to around $1.25 million today, in case the dog died while travelling to New York. Don and his owners travelled in July 1912 aboard the passenger liner SS Kronprinz Wilhelm with New York newspaper The Evening World reporting at the time that the dog “was too seasick on the way over to converse with anybody”. Don performed at Hammerstein's Paradise Roof Garden on 42nd Street in New York City with vaudeville veteran Loney Haskell fielding questions and acting as his interpreter. At one point Don was on the same bill as famed escapologist Harry Houdini. His salary, paid to Haberland, is rumoured to have been around $1,000 a week and the act toured around other Hammerstein stages. After a short return to Germany in the autumn of 1912, Don went back to New York and performed alongside young comedian Sophie Tucker, a major star in the making. Don also became a celebrity endorser for Milk-Bone dog biscuits.

On 27 August 1913 Don made further headlines when he allegedly helped to save a man from drowning at Brighton Beach. Don saw a flailing figure in the water and ran to assist. Sources differ as to whether or not Don barked the word “help” before wading into the water. The man threw his arms around Don's neck and the pair nearly drowned before a policeman on horseback came to help. He himself was knocked off of his horse but the arrival of three lifeguards in a boat rescued the situation. Soon after, Don returned to Germany to enjoy his retirement and he died in 1915.

== See also ==
- List of individual dogs
