= Cherry Sisters =

Vaudeville act

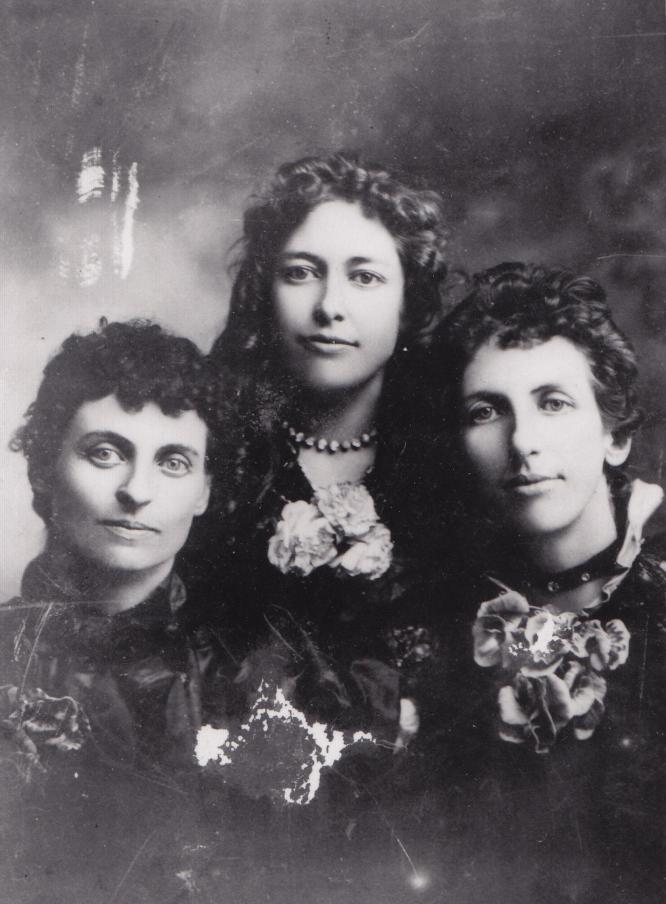
Three of the Cherry Sisters in 1893

The Cherry Sisters – Addie (1859–1942), Effie (1867–1944), Ella (1854–1934), Lizzie (1857–1936), and Jessie Cherry (1871–1903) – were five sisters from Marion, Iowa who formed a notorious vaudeville touring act in the late 19th century. They were also the plaintiffs in a landmark 1901 legal case heard by the Iowa Supreme Court, Cherry v. Des Moines Leader, which was instrumental in establishing and confirming the right of the press to fair comment.

The Cherry Sisters' vaudeville act, Something Good, Something Sad, was infamous for its poor quality and the vehement responses it elicited by audiences, who threw vegetables and disrupted performances. The sisters toured with the act for ten years, during which time they briefly appeared on Broadway. In 1898 they sued two Iowa newspapers for libel after they printed a scathing review of Something Good, Something Sad. The case eventually went to the Iowa Supreme Court, which ruled in the newspapers' favor and set a precedent for the right to fair comment.

The Cherry Sisters' act dissolved after the sudden death of the youngest member of the group, Jessie, in 1903. The rest of the sisters went on to other ventures and opened a bakery, but died in modest circumstances.

== Early life ==
The Cherry sisters were the daughters of Thomas Cherry and Laura Rawson. The family was composed of eight children: Ella, Elizabeth, Addie, Effie, and Jessie, their brother Nathan, and two additional siblings who died at young ages. Ella, the eldest, was born in 1854 in Massachusetts, but the remainder of the children were born in Iowa, and were raised on a farm in Linn County.

== Vaudeville career ==
The Cherry Sisters' vaudeville act was formed in the early 1890s, after the death of their parents and the disappearance of their brother Nathan. Originally all five sisters were involved; however, the eldest, Ella, retired from the stage before 1896, leaving her siblings to continue the act as a quartet.

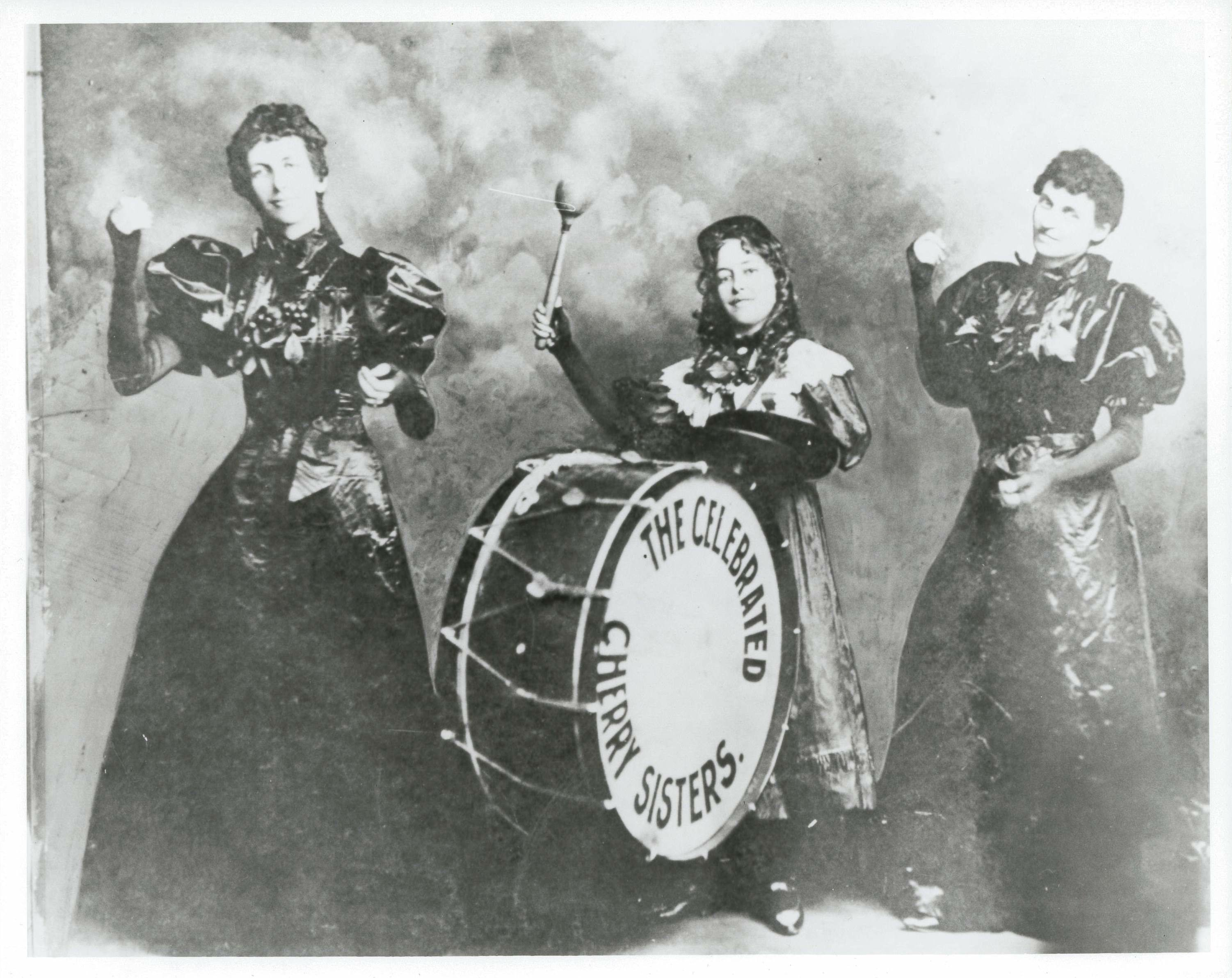
Three of the Cherry Sisters strike a theatrical pose

Addie Cherry described the Cherry sisters' work as "concerts,--literary entertainments." Titled Something Good, Something Sad, their show featured songs, dances, skits, morality plays and essays authored and performed by the sisters. Some of their songs featured new lyrics set to traditional standards; others were completely original compositions. Musical accompaniment was provided for some numbers by Elizabeth and Jessie, who played the piano and bass drum. The material had strong patriotic and religious themes; in one scene, Jessie was suspended from a cross in an imitation of the crucifixion.

The act was received politely by the sisters' neighbors in Marion, but when it went on the road, it received overwhelmingly negative responses from the audiences to which it played. Spectators routinely laughed, heckled, catcalled, booed and threw vegetables at the sisters throughout the entire performance. In several instances the audience's violence reached dangerous proportions: in one incident in Dubuque, a fire extinguisher was sprayed directly into one of the sisters' faces, and the show was stopped by the local marshals to prevent further harm. Eventually the sisters performed behind a wire mesh curtain to avoid being struck by projectiles from the audience, although they would later deny that this had ever been necessary.

In 1896, the Cherry Sisters were brought to Broadway by impresario Willie Hammerstein in an attempt to attract attention to his floundering new venue, the Olympia Music Hall. His rationale, as given in an interview, was, "I've been putting on the best talent, and it hasn't gone over...I'm going to try the worst." The theory was sound: Something Good, Something Sad saved Hammerstein from bankruptcy only twelve days after opening on November 16, and ran for six weeks, drawing audiences who were curious to see the act the New York Times referred to as "Four Freaks from Iowa".

The Times, in their assessment of the sisters, considered the act "more pitiable than amusing" and noted "...the effects of poverty, ignorance, and isolation are much the same all over the world, and the Cherry sisters exhibited every one of them with a pathetic frankness that left no question as to their status or their character."

The sisters were known for their rigid moral standpoints both on and off-stage. While living in New York during their run at the Olympia, they refused all invitations to parties and claimed that they would not visit Coney Island because they did not want to see women in bathing costumes.

=== Cherry v. Des Moines Leader ===
The Cherry Sisters' act was met with derision by the local press as well as audiences. In 1930, Time magazine noted, "In every town that the Cherry sisters played, it was an invariable custom for the editor of the local paper to review their act with a column and a half of humor, satire, parody and biting sarcasm." In January 1893, Fred P. Davis, the city editor of the Cedar Rapids Gazette, reviewed their performance at Greene's Opera House, noting, "...their knowledge of the stage is worse than none at all." The sisters demanded a retraction, and the Gazette complied, allowing them to write it themselves. The Cherry sisters did not consider the retraction to be sufficient and accused Davis of libel. The complaint resulted in a light-hearted mock trial onstage at a Cherry Sisters' performance in March 1893.

In 1898, the Odebolt Chronicle printed an extremely negative review of the Cherry sisters' act, titled "The Cherries Were Here". Critic and newspaper editor Billy Hamilton's piece described the sisters as being "three creatures surpassing the witches in Macbeth in general hideousness" and continued, "the mouths of their rancid features opened like caverns and sounds like the wailings of damned souls issued therefrom." The article was later reprinted in other newspapers around the state, including the Des Moines Leader.

In response, the Cherry Sisters sued the Chronicle and the Leader for US $15,000, claiming that the unflattering descriptions of their physical appearance presented in the article constituted acts of "false and malicious" libel. The Odebolt Chronicle kept an ongoing log of the progress of the proceedings, which included a courtroom performance by the sisters, noting on April 27, 1899, "we had lots of fun out of the case".

The Polk County Court decided in the newspapers' favor in 1899, and the sisters appealed to the Iowa Supreme Court. The Court upheld the verdict, stating in their May 28, 1901 decision, "the editor of a newspaper has the right, if not the duty, of publishing, for the information of the public, fair and reasonable comments, however severe in terms, upon anything which is made by its owner a subject of public exhibition, as upon any other matter of public interest; of privileged communications, for which no action will lie without proof of actual malice...Surely, if one makes himself ridiculous in his public performances, he may be ridiculed by those whose duty or right it is to inform the public regarding the character of the performance."

Cherry v. Des Moines Leader is considered to be a landmark decision confirming the right to fair comment and critical analysis in the press and is still frequently held up as a precedent in contemporary court cases.

=== Retirement and later life ===
After Jessie died from typhoid in 1903 the sisters retired for a short period. However, Addie and Effie continued to perform until the late 1930s, their final appearances taking place in their home town of Cedar Rapids in April 1938. In 1924 and 1926, Effie ran for mayor of Cedar Rapids on a reform platform, but was defeated both times.

== References in contemporary culture ==
The Cherry Sisters have been the subject of at least two contemporary theatrical productions: Cherry Bomb, a comedic musical play produced and performed by 1812 Productions in Philadelphia, and Cherry Sisters Revisited, a 2006 play by Dan O'Brien.

They are featured as forerunners of the outsider music genre in Irwin Chusid's book Songs in the Key of Z.

The story of the Cherry Sisters is featured as one of the segments in Season 4, Episode 11 of Comedy Central's show Drunk History. The sisters were portrayed by Jessie Ennis (Ella), Ashley Johnson (Elizabeth), Andrea Savage (Addie), Mary Lynn Rajskub (Effie), and Allison Tolman (Jessie).

An advertisement for the Cherry Sisters is featured as one of the objects explored in Season 7, Episode 22 of Mysteries at the Museum.
