= Social Hypocrites =

- Directed by: Albert Capellani; Leander De Cordova(ass't director)
- Written by: Albert Capellani; June Mathis
- Based on: a play Bridge and Debussy by Alice Ramsey
- Produced by: Maxwell Karger
- Starring: May Allison
- Cinematography: Eugene Gaudio
- Distributed by: Metro Pictures
- Release date: April 6, 1918
- Running time: 1hour
- Country: USA
- Language: Silent..English titles

Social Hypocrites is a 1918 silent film drama directed by Albert Capellani and starring May Allison. It was produced and distributed by Metro Pictures.

== Cast ==
- May Allison - Leonore Fielding
- Marie Wainwright - Maria, Duchess of St. Keverne
- Joseph Kilgour - Lord Royle Fitzmaurice
- Henry Kolker - Dr. Frank Simpson
- Stella Hammerstein - Lady Vanessa Norton
- Frank Currier - Col. Francis Fielding
- Ethel Winthrop - Lady Felicia Mountstephen
- Maggie Breyer - Fluffy
- Stephen Grattan - Father Gilbert Grandon

== Preservation status ==
- This is a surviving film with copies in the Cinema Museum, London and Archives Du Film Du CNC (Bois d'Arcy).
