= Paradise Roof Garden =

Entertainment venue in New York City

Coordinates: 40.756761°N 73.986528°W

- Hammerstein's
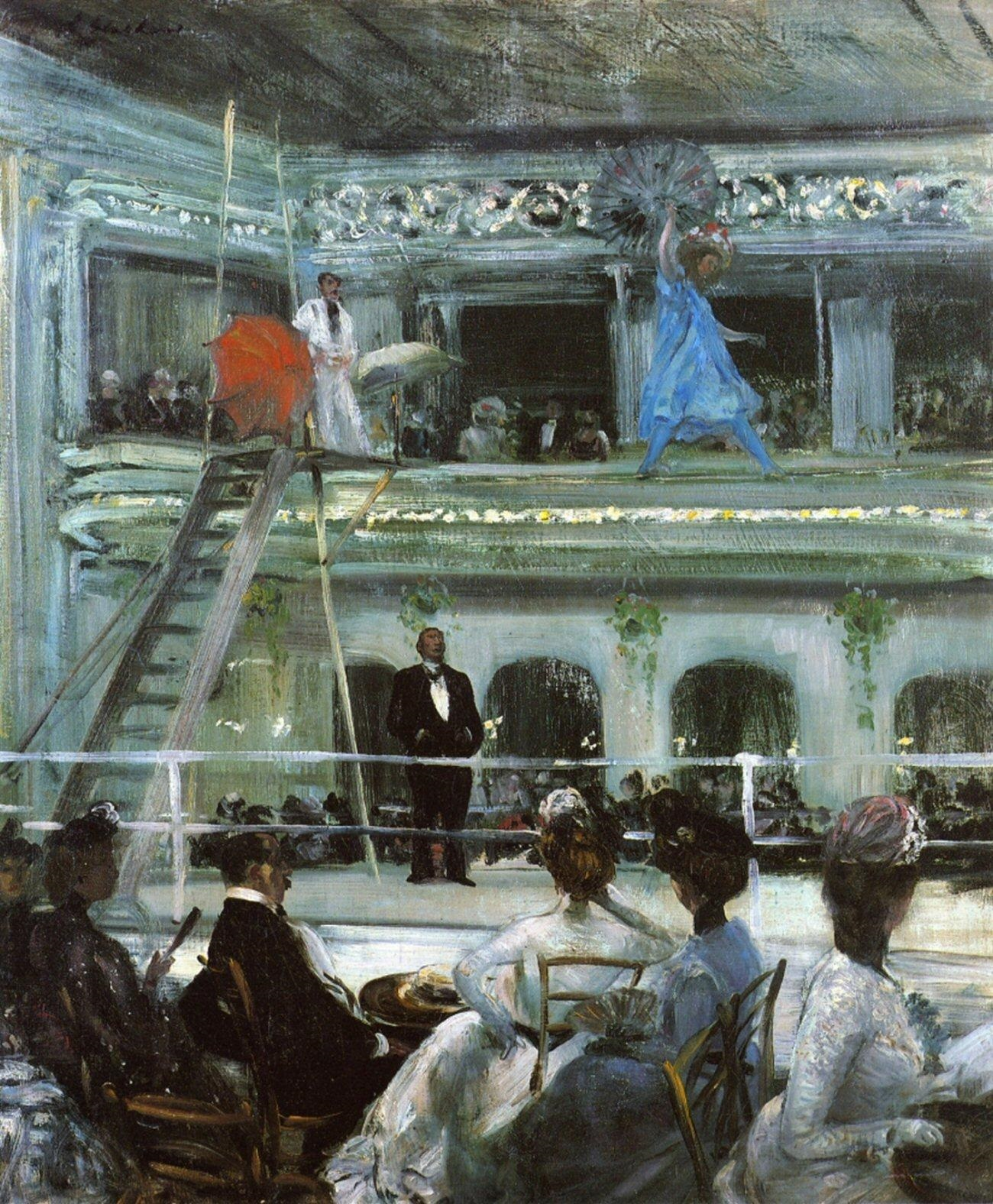
- Hammerstein's Roof Garden, William Glackens
- Interactive map of Paradise Roof Garden
- Address: 42nd Street and Seventh Avenue; New York City; United States
- Owner: Oscar Hammerstein I
- Operator: Oscar and Willie Hammerstein
- Type: Broadway, Vaudeville, Roof Garden

Construction
- Opened: 1899
- Demolished: 1915

Hammerstein's Roof Garden (1899–1915) was the official name of the semi-outdoor vaudeville venue that theatre magnate, Oscar Hammerstein I, built atop the Victoria Theatre and the neighboring Theatre Republic, commonly known then as the Belasco Theatre. Unlike Hammerstein’s first roof garden theatre, which crowned his failed Olympia Theatre, the Paradise Roof Garden was able to rise to prominence and contend with its rivals for the better parts of two decades. For New York City theatre-goers, the name Hammerstein’s grew to encompass both the Victoria and its roof garden. From 1904 to 1914 it was run by Willie Hammerstein, who put on highly popular vaudeville acts.

== Design ==
The construction of the Victoria suffered from an anemic budget, and as a result, its roof garden developed incrementally. It opened in 1899 as the Venetian Terrace Roof Garden and featured a “‘grand promenade’ in the style of Monte Carlo.” The middle of its three tiers consisted of boxes; the third, an open-air café. In compliance with the city’s building code, Hammerstein added eight exits and two elevators to his “solid steel and concrete construction” before summer season of 1902 commenced. He also gained permission to install a roof that could open or close to accommodate the weather.

The bulk of the theatre rested over the Victoria, leaving the roof of the Belasco free for novelty features, including a pond, a Dutch-style dairy farm, and a windmill. The “Mute Revue” consisted of garden displays that paid tribute to the theatrical hits of the closing season. Just in time for the opening of the summer season of 1907, the entire venue was upgraded: the house was repainted in white and blue with splashes of red, and the boxes were remodeled and decked with geraniums.

== Variety and vaudeville ==
In addition to entertainment, the open-air Paradise Roof Garden offered patrons escape from the city’s oppressive summer heat. The table-and-chair seating configuration encouraged conversation in a house that was vulnerable to sunlight and outside noise; simple, wordless variety entertainment was well suited to such conditions. Some of the “dumb acts” that played on the roof included Barnold’s Dog and Monkey Pantomime Company, and wire-walker Bird Millman; in fact, William Glackens’s painting, titled simply Hammerstein’s Roof Garden, depicts such an act.

== Demise ==
As advancements in air-conditioning were rendering New York’s roof garden theatres obsolete, silent movies were luring patrons out of vaudeville theatres. With the selling of the Victoria in 1915, the roof garden closed as well.
