= Theerhütte =

- Village of Gardelegen
- Interactive map of Theerhütte
- Location within Germany Location within Saxony-Anhalt
- Coordinates: 52°27′00″N 11°31′00″E
- Country: Germany
- State: Saxony-Anhalt
- District: Altmarkkreis Salzwedel
- Town: Gardelegen

Population (2022)
  - Total: 41
- Time zone: UTC+01:00 (CET)
  - Summer (DST): UTC+02:00 (CEST)

Theerhütte is a settlement in the Letzlingen district of the town of Gardelegen and is located in the Altmarkkreis Salzwedel in Saxony-Anhalt. Theerhütte literally translates to "Tar Hut".

== Geography ==
The Theerhütte settlement is located about two kilometers northeast of Letzlingen, directly on the Colbitz-Letzlinger Heath on the southern edge of the Altmark at an altitude of 72 meters. The Wanneweh flows southwest into the Wannegraben.

== History ==
In 1772, a Theerhütte was first mentioned in Letzling, Amt (Kloster) Neuendorf. Further mentions are Lezlinger Theerhütte in 1790, Letzlingischer Theerofen in 1804, Theerofen in 1820, Colonie Theerhütte in 1873, and Theerhütte in 1958.

The village initially belonged – together with Letzlingen – to the Tangermündescher Kreis, from 1807 to 1813 to the Landkanton Gardelegen, and from 1816 to the Gardelegen district. Between c. 1885 and 1929, the village was divided into two parts: the forester's farm belonged to the Letzlingen estate, the other part to the rural municipality of the same name. On 30 September 1929, the Letzlingen estate was dissolved, and the Theerhütte forester's farm was incorporated into the rural municipality of Letzlingen.

Tar cookers, potash burners, charcoal burners, and forest workers with small farms once lived here.

== Don, the Talking Dog ==
The talking dog "Don" of the imperial forester Hermann Ebers made Theerhütte famous at the beginning of the 20th century. The dog could pronounce words like "quiet" or "cake," as was even reported in the New York Times. In 1910, the phenomenon was scientifically investigated. The recordings have survived.

The Letzlinger Chronik stated that Ebers' daughter Marta, traveled halfway around the world with her four-legged wonder dog, appearing in variety shows in America, Australia, and Russia.
