= Willie Hammerstein =

American theatre manager (1875–1914)

- Born: William Hammerstein; September 26, 1875; New York City, U.S.
- Died: June 10, 1914 (aged 38); New York City, U.S.
- Occupation: Theater manager
- Known for: Victoria Theatre, Freak acts
- Spouses: Alice Nimmo; Annie Nimmo
- Children: 2, including Oscar Hammerstein II
- Parent(s): Oscar Hammerstein I Rose Blau
- Relatives: Arthur Hammerstein (brother); Stella Hammerstein (sister); James Hammerstein (grandson); Elaine Hammerstein (niece)

William Hammerstein (September 26, 1875 – June 10, 1914) was an American theater manager. He ran the Victoria Theatre on what became Times Square, Manhattan, presenting very popular vaudeville shows with a wide variety of acts. He was known for "freak acts", where celebrities or people notorious for scandals appeared on stage. Hammerstein's Victoria Theatre became the most successful in New York.

== Early years ==
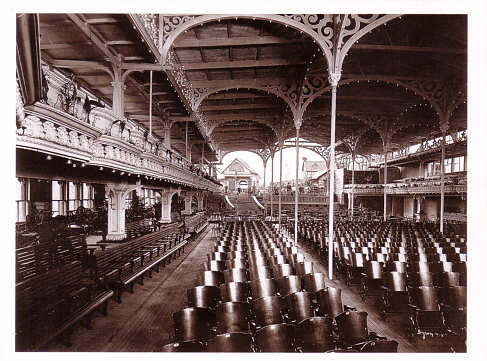
Paradise Roof Garden around 1902

William Hammerstein was born in New York City on September 26, 1875, son of Oscar Hammerstein, the theater impresario, and his first wife, née Rose Blau. He started work as a press agent, then built a vaudeville theatre on 110th Street, Manhattan, called Little Coney Island. He also managed burlesque shows. Willie Hammerstein managed his father's Olympia Theater, which opened in 1895. In November 1896 Willie Hammerstein brought the Cherry Sisters to the Olympia roof garden. The sisters put on a terrible act where they sang sentimental, dialect or patriotic songs. One of them played the piano and another banged a drum. Willie knew how bad they were. He provided a net that protected them when the audience, as expected, started throwing produce and garbage at the stage. The word spread, and the sisters became a big draw.

Oscar Hammerstein went bankrupt in 1898 and his Olympia theater, which Willie was managing, was sold at auction, but he simultaneously built the Victoria Theatre and the roof top Venetian Terrace Garden. Willie took over management of the complex, by then known collectively as "Hammerstein's", in February 1904.

== Victoria Theatre ==
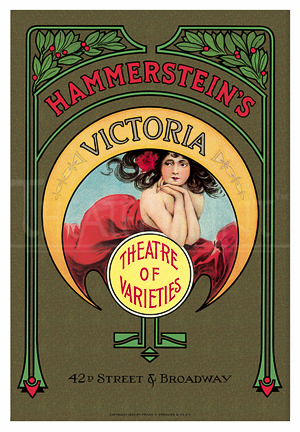
1913 poster for the Victoria

Willie was talented at finding, booking, and promoting variety acts, plays, and musicals. Willie mounted popular low-brow vaudeville shows at low prices. He promoted new performers and established celebrities of all types, physical freaks, illusionists, and risqué exotic dancers. The highly varied programs drew large, boisterous, and often noisy audiences.

Willie Hammerstein ran the only vaudeville theater in Times Square and had no other theatres. He developed shows uniquely fitted to his local audience. The crowd at the Victoria like the jaded and cynical atmosphere, the stage slang and black humor. Acts could afford to include more sexual innuendo than in other houses. To keep costs and prices down, a typical Hammerstein bill would feature a few well-paid stars and a large number of lower-priced novelty acts.

Hammerstein made the Victoria the most popular venue for vaudeville in New York. The Victoria was a grand building, and played some high-quality acts. As of 1905 the theater owners who booked through the William Morris Agency seemed likely to become dominant in the vaudeville industry. They included Hammerstein, Frederick Freeman Proctor, Timothy Sullivan and Percy G. Williams. Later the Keith-Albee circuit booking office gave Hammerstein a monopoly on big-time vaudeville in Times Square.

Willie's father was much more interested in grand opera, and in 1906 opened the Manhattan Opera House. Revenue from the Victoria kept the opera house running. At one point Oscar Hammerstein, always short of money, moved to sell the Victoria to the Shubert family. Willie and his brother Arthur, who produced shows, blocked the attempt. In March 1913 Keith and Albee paid Oscar Hammerstein a reported $225,000 to give up his monopoly. They opened the Palace Theatre at 47th Street and 7th Avenue, advertising "refined glamour" and featuring the biggest stars of vaudeville. Acts became harder to book, since performers did not want to be connected with a rival of the powerful Keith's circuit.

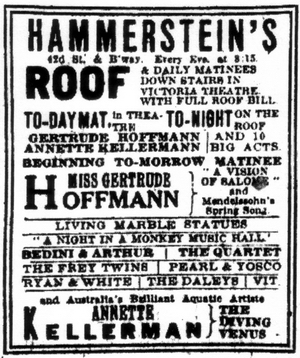
Advertisement from The New York Times, July 18, 1909

== Acts ==
Performers enjoyed playing the Victoria. Buster Keaton thought it was the greatest of the vaudeville houses. Hammerstein asked performers back many times if he liked them, as with the British comedian Harry Tate. In June 1905 Willie Hammerstein signed up Will Rogers to perform in the Victoria for afternoon matinees and in the Paradise Roof Garden in the evenings. The young Mae West played eleven one-week engagements in 1912 and 1913, a good fit with the audience through her suggestion of notoriety. Hammerstein often booked acts from Europe, who sometimes made up half the show. He introduced the dancers Gertrude Hoffmann and Constance Stewart-Richardson to the vaudeville stage. A review in the New York Dramatic Mirror of August 12, 1905, gives a sense of the shows:

Carmencita ... returned to New York last week, and was warmly greeted by large audiences. For those who are fond of Spanish dancing her turn proved as attractive as ever, and she seems to have lost none of the suppleness and grace that characterized her performances in the old days... Holdovers who continued to win applause were Ernest Hogan and his Memphis Students, Rice and Prevost, the quaint comedy acrobats; Four Bard Brothers, fine gymnasts, and Will R. Rogers, lasso expert. Barney Fagan and Henrietta Byron scored heavily in their splendidly costumed act, and Alliene's monkey, Hayes and Healey, the Great Valmont and the Taylor Sisters rounded out a splendid programme.

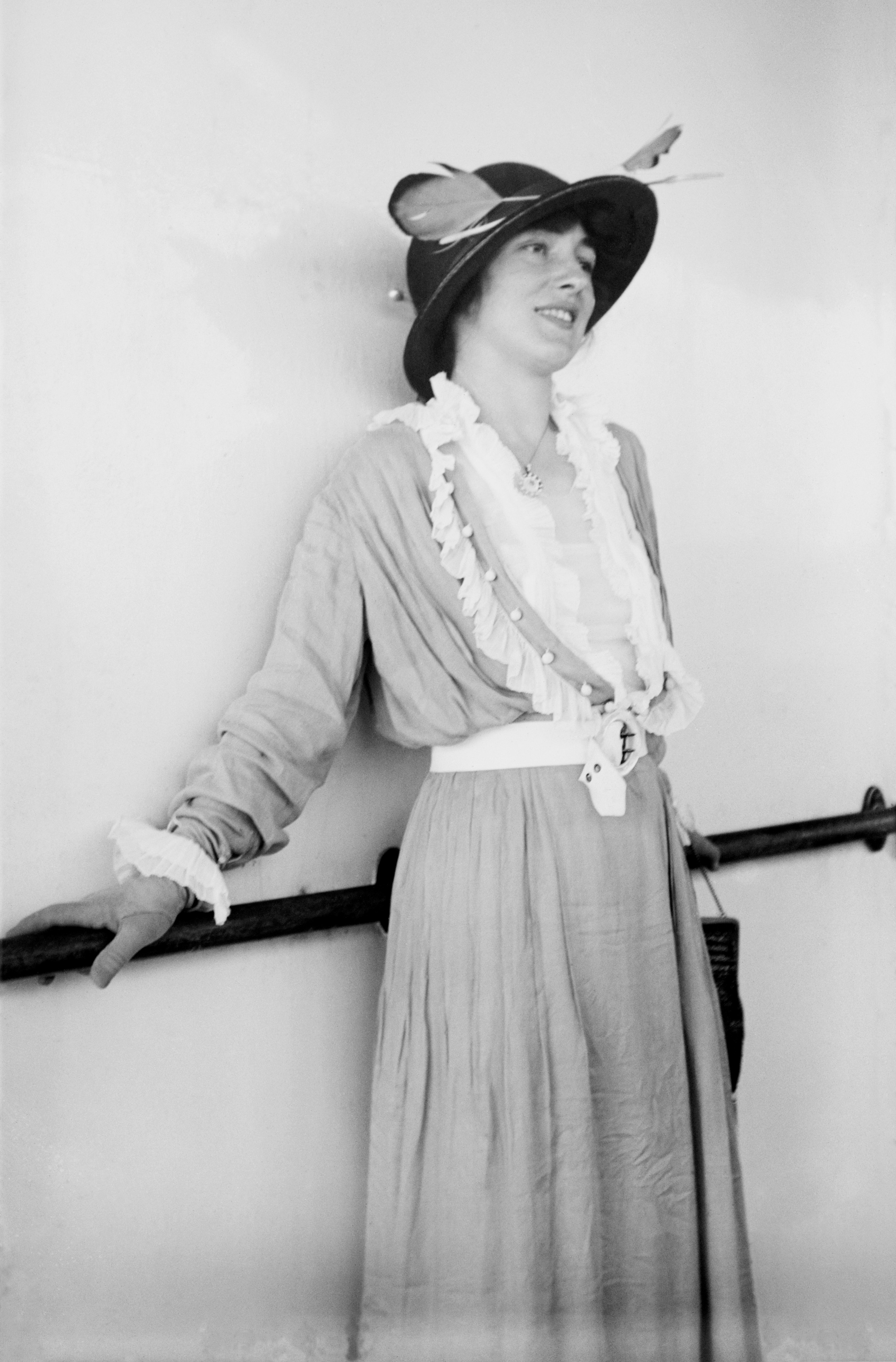
The scandalous Evelyn Nesbit was a draw

Willie Hammerstein became known for his "freak acts". Typically these featured people who had scandalized the public and gained notoriety. Members of love triangles involving murders or suicides were popular, if one of their members was free to appear and give the public the titillating details. Evelyn Nesbit, whose wealthy husband murdered famed architect Stanford White, was an example. (Note: Evelyn Nesbit was a chorus girl and artist's model who had married Harry Thaw, a Pittsburg millionaire. In 1906 her husband killed her former lover, the architect Stanford White, in public in the Roof Garden Theater above Madison Square Garden. The trial revealed that White had been a sensualist who liked to seduce young girls, and Thaw was a sadist. Everyone in New York City knew the sensational story behind Evelyn Nesbit Thaw, ostensibly booked to perform modern ballroom dancing.) In 1911 Irving Berlin was featured at the Victoria, billed as "The Composer of a Hundred Hits", and performed a number of his songs including That Mysterious Rag. Berlin was hired more as a celebrity songwriter than for his ability to sing, but was a hit with the audience anyway.

Other types of human curiosity were "Shekla, Court Magician to the Shah of Persia" and "Madamoiselle Fatima, Escaped Harem Dancer: ... She has a distinctive Turkish personality and dances with original movements all her own, accompanied by her two Eunuch Servants." Hammerstein also put on novelties like Don the Talking Dog. Sports celebrities like boxer James J. Corbett and baseball pitcher Rube Marquard also drew audiences.

== Family and legacy ==
Hammerstein was unusual in making a sharp separation between his work in the theater, which he loved, and his home life. He would not pose for a photograph, and told his press agents not to use his name in publicity. Hammerstein married Alice Nimmo in 1893, and they had two sons, Oscar and Reginald. They lived at 315 Central Park West. His wife died in 1910 and he married her sister, Annie Nimmo. He never took part in Broadway night life, and he did not want his two sons to get involved in theater. However, his son Oscar Hammerstein II became the most famous lyricist and musical comedy writer of the era.

Willie Hammerstein suffered from a disease of the kidneys, and died in New York on June 10, 1914. He was aged 38. He had made the Victoria his own. His brother, Arthur, took over management but was unable to recapture the spirit. The theater soon had to be closed. The Victoria Theatre was pulled down two years after Willie Hammerstein died, and the Rialto was built in its place, the first movie palace in Times Square. (Note: The Strand Theatre had opened at Broadway and W. 47th Street on April 11, 1914, just to the north of Times Square, putting on stage shows as well as films. The Rialto Theatre on Times Square at Broadway and W. 42nd Street opened on April 21, 1916. It was billed as "The original Temple of the Motion Picture" and screened five films daily. Sound was provided by an orchestra, solo singers and an organ.)
