= Oscar Hammerstein I =

German-American impresario (1846–1919)

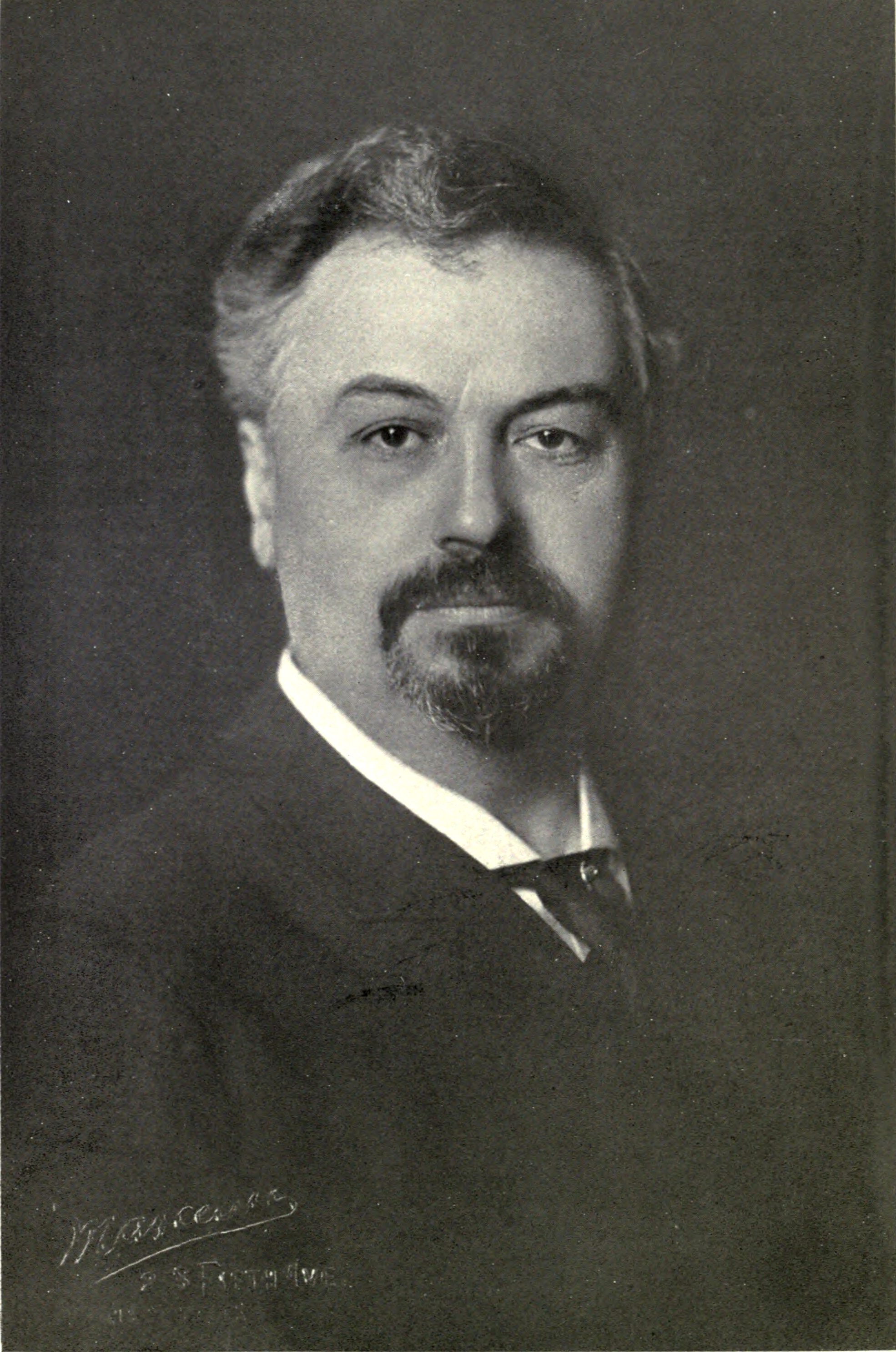
- Portrait from Who's Who on the Stage, 1906
- Born: 8 May 1846; Stettin, Kingdom of Prussia
- Died: 1 August 1919 (aged 73); Lenox Hill Hospital, Manhattan, New York City, U.S.
- Occupations: Businessman, composer, theater impresario
- Children: Abe; Harold; Arthur; Willie; Stella; Rose
- Relatives: Oscar Hammerstein II (grandson); Elaine Hammerstein (granddaughter); James Hammerstein (great-grandson)

Oscar Hammerstein I (8 May 1846 – 1 August 1919) was a German-born businessman, theater impresario, and composer in New York City. His passion for opera led him to open several opera houses, and he rekindled opera's popularity in America. He was the grandfather of American playwright/lyricist Oscar Hammerstein II and the father of theater manager William Hammerstein and American producer Arthur Hammerstein.

== Early life and education ==
Oscar Hammerstein I was born in Stettin (capital of the province of Pomerania), Kingdom of Prussia in present-day Szczecin, Poland, to German Jewish parents Abraham and Berthe Hammerstein. He took up the flute, piano, and violin at an early age. His mother died when he was fifteen years old. During his youth, Hammerstein's father wanted him to continue with his education and to specialize in subjects such as algebra, but Hammerstein wanted to pursue music. After Oscar went skating in a park one day, his father found out and whipped him as punishment, goading Hammerstein to flee his family. With the proceeds from the sale of his violin, Hammerstein purchased a ticket to Liverpool, from which he departed on a three-month-long cruise to the United States, arriving in New York City in 1864.

== Career ==
=== Cigar manufacturer ===
Hammerstein made ends meet initially by working at a cigar factory on Pearl Street. He worked his way up to become a cigar maker himself, and also founded the United States Tobacco Journal. Hammerstein would eventually become the owner of at least 80 patents, with most of them related to the machines he invented for the cigar-making process.

On 8 March 1881, Hammerstein received Patent No. 238,500 for his cigar-making machine. The initial machine sold for $6,000. Numerous improvements boosted its value to $200,000. Another of his inventions was a more efficient plumbing system after his kitchen sink sprang a leak.

Hammerstein's best-known contribution to the cigar-making process was adding an air-suctioning component to cigar rollers. On 1 August 1882 he received Patent No. 261,849 for a method of using suction to hold wrappers of cigars and cigarettes in place on a table, enabling them to hold down tobacco leaves firmly so the leaves could be cut more cleanly – before being wrapped around the cigar or cigarette.

He became wealthy industrializing cigar manufacturing, and his tobacco fortune provided the money he used to pursue his theater interests. On 4 May 1920 he posthumously received Patent No. 1,338,768A for a new way to remove the mid-rib from tobacco leaves.

=== Producer and impresario ===
Hammerstein built his first theater, the Harlem Opera House, on 125th Street in 1889, along with 50 housing developments. His second theater, the Columbus Theatre, was built in 1890 on the same street, and featured light theatrical productions.

His third theater was the first Manhattan Opera House, built in 1893 on 34th Street. This failed as an opera house and was used, in partnership with Koster and Bial, to present variety shows. Hammerstein was displeased with the partnership to the point that it fell into bitterness: "When I get through with you, everybody will forget there ever was a Koster and Bial. I will build a house the likes of which has never been seen in the whole world."

In 1895 he opened a fourth venue, the Olympia Theatre, on Longacre Square, where he presented a comic opera that he wrote himself, Santa Maria (1896). While it was positively received by The New York Times, Hammerstein's personal experience was less than peaceful, with the production being plagued by cost overruns with the cast and scenery. In the end, Hammerstein cleared only one-tenth of the costs that were put into Santa Maria.

Nine years later, Longacre Square was renamed Times Square, and the area had become, through his efforts, a thriving theater district.

Hammerstein built three more theaters there, the Victoria Theatre (1899), which turned to vaudeville presentation in 1904 and was managed by his son, Willie Hammerstein before closing in 1915; the Theatre Republic was built in 1900 and leased to eccentric producer David Belasco in 1901, and the Lew Fields Theatre for Lew Fields (half of the Vaudeville team Weber and Fields, and the father of lyricist Dorothy Fields), in 1904.

Oscar Hammerstein went bankrupt in 1898 and his Olympia theater was sold at auction, but this didn't prevent him from simultaneously raising enough money to build the Victoria Theatre, which opened as a legitimate theater on March 3, 1899. On June 26, 1899, he opened a partially enclosed roof garden theater, the Venetian Terrace Garden, with an outdoor promenade that was attached to the roof garden of Hammerstein's Theatre Republic. In 1900 Hammerstein enlarged the roof garden theater and reopened it in May 1901 as the Paradise Roof Garden. Collectively, the multiple performance venues in the building were known simply as "Hammerstein's".

He wrote a musical called Punch, Judy & Co. in 1903.

=== Opera ===
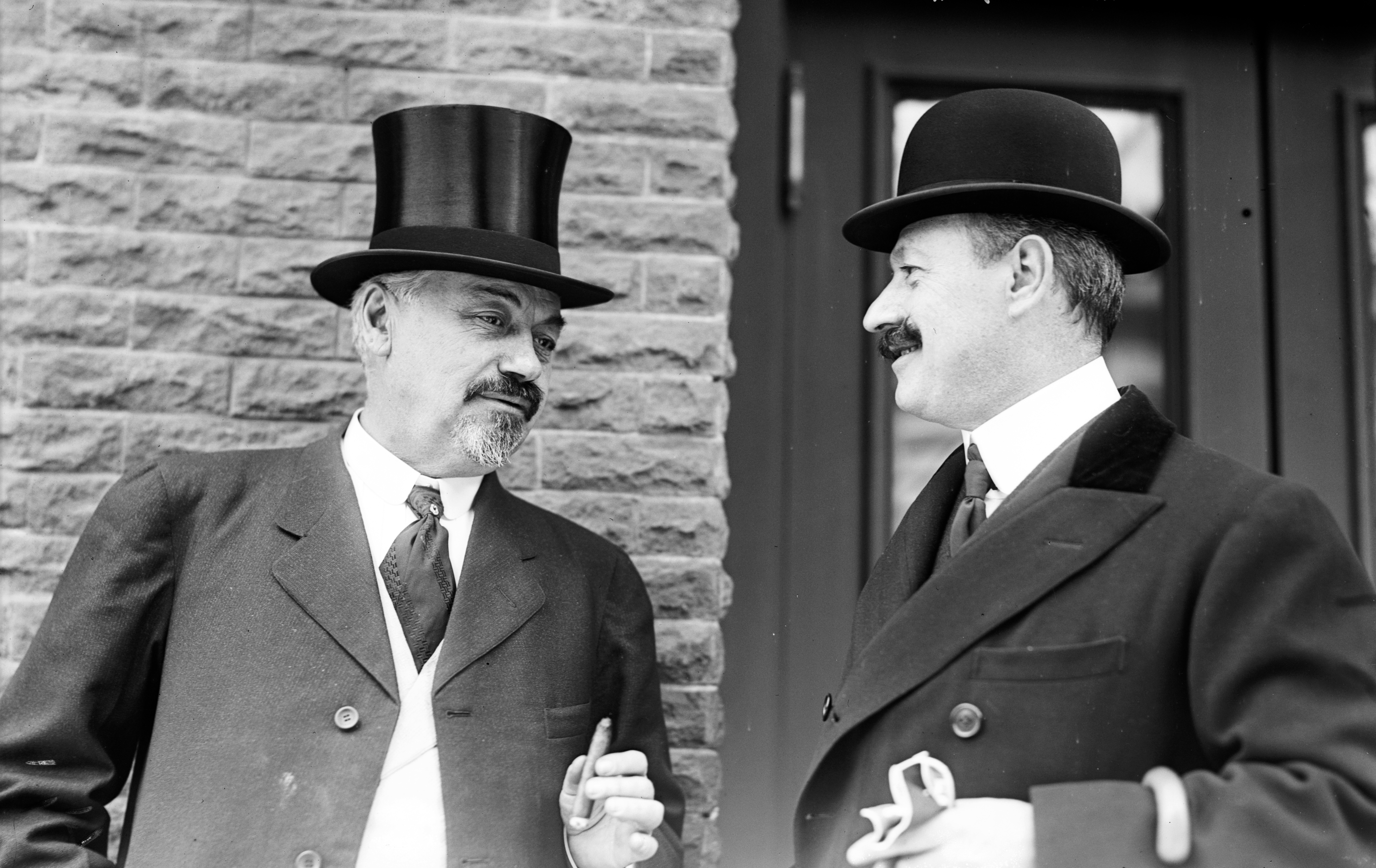
Hammerstein left) with conductor Cleofonte Campanini in New York City in 1908

In 1906, Hammerstein, dissatisfied with the Metropolitan Opera's productions, opened an eighth theater, his second Manhattan Opera House, to directly (and successfully) compete with it. He also opened the Philadelphia Opera House in 1908, which, however, he sold early in 1910.

He produced contemporary operas and presented the American premieres of Louise, Pelleas et Melisande, Elektra, Le jongleur de Notre-Dame, Thaïs, and Salome, as well as the American debuts of Mary Garden and Luisa Tetrazzini. Since the star soprano Nellie Melba was disenchanted with the Metropolitan, she deserted it for Hammerstein's company, rescuing it financially with a successful season. He also produced the successful Victor Herbert operetta Naughty Marietta in 1910.

Hammerstein became famous during his opera years for putting noticeably large budgets out for his productions, Santa Maria being one example. More often than not, he would fall into financial trouble within a short period of time. The New York Times conducted an interview with Hammerstein, and when the interviewer asked him about his financial habits, Hammerstein responded:

Financially, I never undertake anything without plenty of ammunition. I am never afraid of being ambushed in this account. I decided that my preliminary contracts should be drawn up provisionally upon my success in securing the great stars. I always contemplated an honorable retreat.

Hammerstein's high-quality productions were ultimately too expensive to sustain, and by his fourth opera season, he was going bankrupt. The costs at the Metropolitan, too, were skyrocketing, as the Metropolitan spent more and more in order to effectively compete. Hammerstein's son Arthur negotiated a payment of $1.2 million from the Metropolitan in exchange for an agreement not to produce grand opera in the United States for ten years.

With this money, Hammerstein built his tenth theater, the London Opera House, in London, where he again entered competition with an established opera house, Covent Garden's Royal Opera House. He had run through his money in two years and thereupon returned to America. During a trip to Paris, a special cable was sent to him out of curiosity asking whether he wanted to quit opera in New York, given that during his 1909/1910 opera seasons in New York and Philadelphia, Hammerstein had failed in successfully maintaining audiences in his two venues in each city. He simply responded by saying, "[Opera in New York is] what I'm here for. I can't say anymore."

With money obtained selling the sole booking rights to the Victoria Theatre, he built his eleventh and final theatre, the Lexington Opera House. Unable to present opera there, he opened it as a movie theatre, selling it shortly thereafter. On 28 April 1910, Hammerstein officially ended producing opera, opting to solely focus on dramatic productions. All of his contracts and buildings of operation were turned over to the Metropolitan Opera Company.

Hammerstein's first wife was Rosa (Rose) Blau. After Rosa died, he married Melvina Jacobi, who was born in New York City. The marriage took place on 7 December 1879 in Montgomery, Alabama. Melvina's parents, Henrietta and Simon Jacobi, were Jews from Bavaria (possibly Grünstadt) who settled in New Orleans, Louisiana and, later, Montgomery, Alabama. Melvina and Oscar had two daughters – Rose and Estella (Stella).

=== Legal problems ===
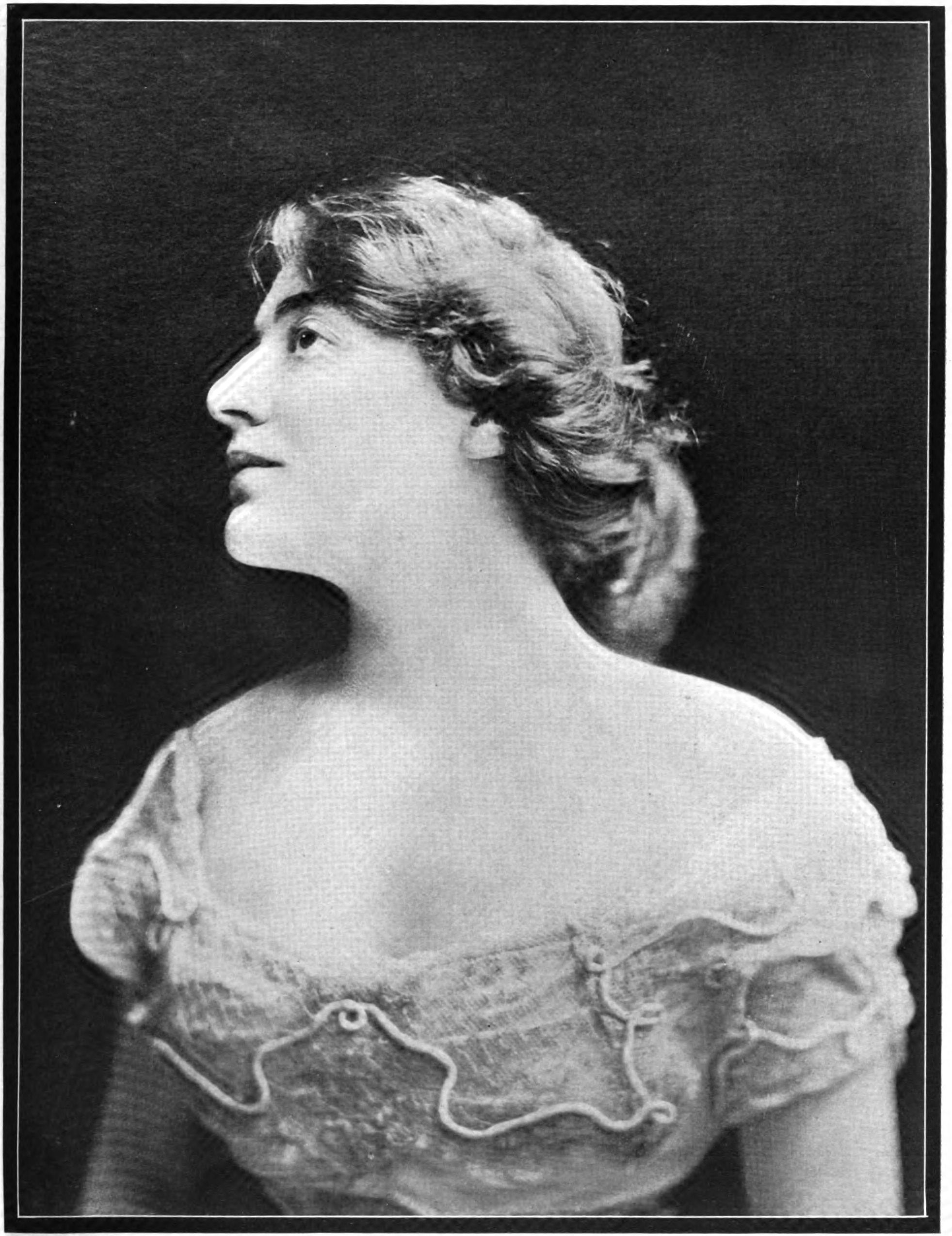
Stella Hammerstein

Late in his career, Hammerstein experienced numerous legal setbacks, most of them pertaining to ownership of his opera houses, which he endured stoically.

One of his more infamous accusations was from a Frances Lee, an opera singer, who accused him of preventing her from singing in the Manhattan Opera House after one performance. Hammerstein was found not guilty and settled his possible payment for up to $35.

Hammerstein had given his two daughters, Stella and Rose Hammerstein, $200 a week for financial support after the death of his first wife. The payments were given to them by the Equitable Trust Company securely in exchange for stock shares in Hammerstein's Victoria Theatre. In 1912, Hammerstein requested his stocks back from the company and chose to no longer pay for his daughters. Stella and Rose sought to fight against their father, who believed that they could support themselves on their own. Infamously, he compared paying his daughters to "the eccentricities and actions of the late lamented King Lear."

== Death ==
Hammerstein contracted kidney problems and paralysis, eventually permanently falling into a coma. He died in 1919 at Lenox Hill Hospital at Park Avenue and 77th Street in Manhattan. His contractual ban on presenting opera was due to expire in 1920; at his death, he was busy planning his return to the opera stage. He is interred at Woodlawn Cemetery in The Bronx, New York City.

== Legacy ==
A 1910 song by Jack Norworth entitled "For Months and Months and Months" mentions Hammerstein in its first stanza.

The Manhattan Opera House was bid for $145,000 by Hammerstein's two daughters. They would also sue Hammerstein's third wife, Emma Swift Hammerstein, over money and ownership of the building. Emma Hammerstein would go to court claiming ownership through Hammerstein Opera Company stock, but the stocks were found to be null and void by the judge. The Manhattan Opera House on 34th Street in New York City was renamed the "Hammerstein Ballroom" at the Manhattan Center Studios in his honor.

Hammerstein's son Arthur developed Hammerstein's Theatre (now the Ed Sullivan Theater) at 1697 Broadway in his father's honor. The theater opened on November 30, 1927.

== Broadway credits ==
- Santa Maria (1896) – comic opera – composer, lyricist, producer
- Sweet Marie (1901) – musical – producer
- Resurrection (1903) – play – producer, theater owner/operator
- Punch, Judy & Co. (1903) – musical – composer, lyricist, bookwriter and producer
- Hans, the Flute Player (1910) – opera – producer
- Naughty Marietta (1910) – operetta – producer

== Hammerstein family ==
Hammerstein had four sons, Abe, Harold, Arthur, Willie and two daughters: Stella and Rose. Arthur continued the family business as an opera and Broadway producer, director, theater owner, and songwriter. Willie managed Oscar's Victoria Theatre, and Willie's son Oscar Hammerstein II was one of Broadway's most influential lyricists and bookwriters, as well as a director and producer.
