= Stella Hammerstein =

American actress

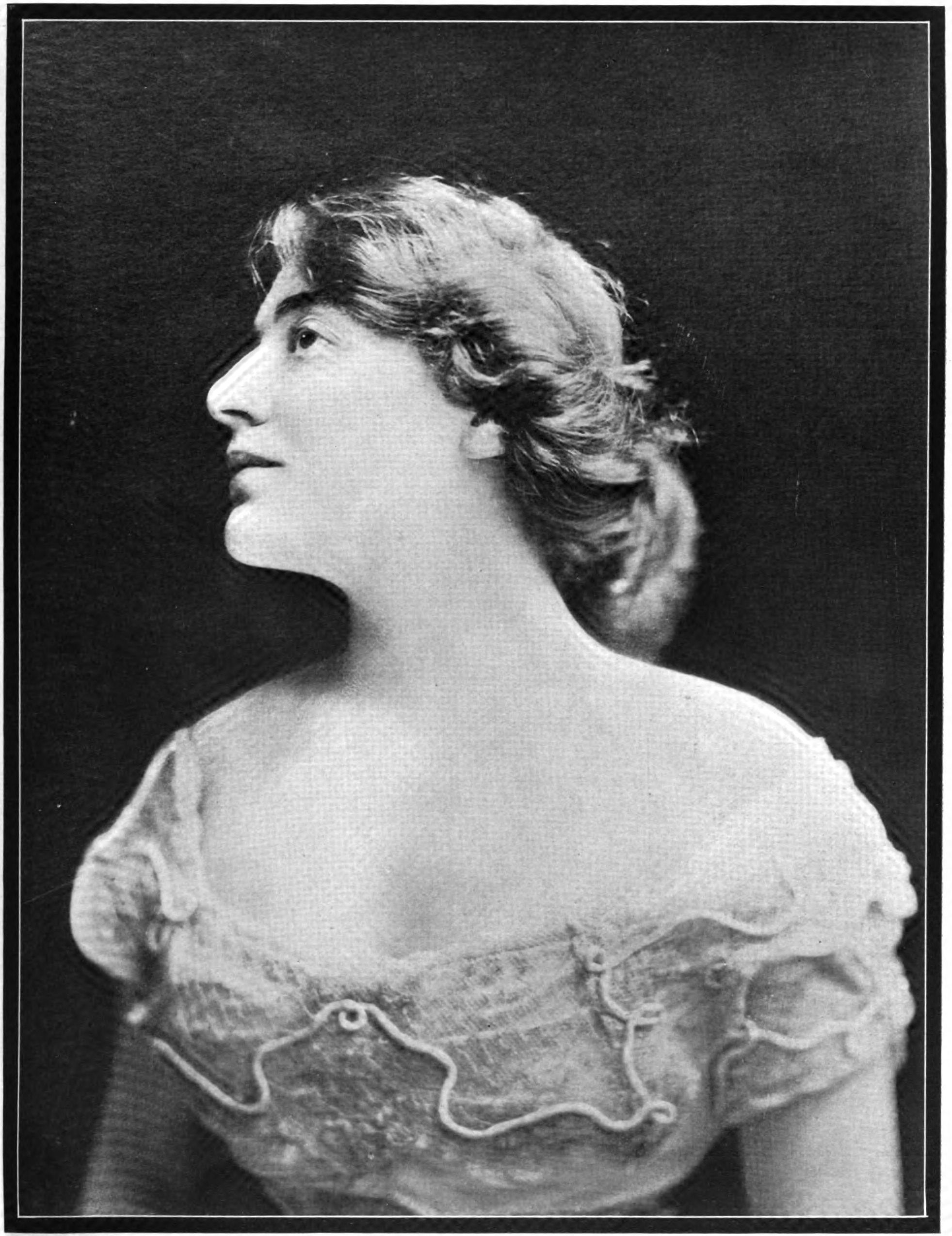
- Hammerstein in 1908
- Born: January 2, 1882; New York City, U.S.
- Died: June 7, 1975 (aged 93); Englewood, New Jersey, U.S.
- Other names: Stella Steele
- Occupation: Actress
- Years active: 1902–1918
- Spouse: Frederick L. C. Keating (m. 1912; div. 1919) Charles F. Pope (m. 1920, died)
- Father: Oscar Hammerstein I

Estella (Stella) Hammerstein (January 2, 1882 – June 7, 1975) was an American actress. She was sometimes billed as Stella Steele.

== Early years ==
Hammerstein was born on January 2, 1882, in New York City, she was the daughter of Oscar Hammerstein I, a German composer who spent most of his career in America and was the grandfather of Oscar Hammerstein II. and Malvina Jacobi Hammerstein, both of whom initially opposed her going into show business as a profession. In 1908, she told a New York Times reporter of her father's reaction when, at age 20, she told him that she was going into musical comedy: "Papa without more ado piled me over his knee and applied the hairbrush vigorously." Eventually he accepted her desire to be an actress.

== Career ==
In 1902, Hammerstein joined the stock theater company headed by Daniel Frohman. She debuted on January 7 of that year in Frocks and Frills. In 1904, she went to London to study drama and soon joined an opera company. Her stay was cut short when her father ordered her home as a way of breaking up a romantic relationship that she had developed with a magazine publisher. She returned to London in April 1907 to join one of the theatrical companies of George Joseph Edwardes. In 1908, she returned to the United States to perform in George M. Cohan's The Yankee Prince when it had its premiere in Hartford, Connecticut.

Hammerstein's hopes of eventually singing grand opera and becoming a prima donna were dashed when her father's throat specialist told her in 1908 that her vocal cords were "much too weak for really great music".

Hammerstein's Broadway credits included Everywoman (1911), The American Idea (1908), The Yankee Prince (1908), Winsome Winnie (1903), The Blonde in Black (1903), Notre Dame (1902), and Frocks and Frills (1902). She also appeared in On the Eve at the Hollis Street Theatre in Boston in 1909.

She initiated her vaudeville career in 1912 in a playlet, The Tyranny of Fate, in Atlantic City. The following year, she co-authored Getting the Goods, a play for vaudeville.

Hammerstein appeared in the films The Ace of Death (1915), Anna Karenina (1915), and Social Hypocrites (1918).

== Hammerstein Amusement Company ==
In September 1919, approximately two months after the death of their father, Hammerstein and her sister, Rose Hammerstein Tostevin, became owners of the Hammerstein Amusement Company. A judge of the Supreme Court of the State of New York ruled that the two daughters were the rightful owners of 4,998 shares of the company's total of 5,000 shares of stock. The ownership had been the subject of a legal dispute involving the sisters, Oscar Hammerstein's widow, and a trust company with which the shares had been deposited as security for alimony payments to Oscar Hammerstein's first wife.

== Personal life ==
On October 5, 1912, Hammerstein married Frederick Lionel Chester Keating, an attorney, in Jersey City. They were divorced in March 1920, and on April 1, 1920, she married Charles Fyles Pope, vice-president of the International Doll Association.
