= Arthur Hammerstein =

American songwriter

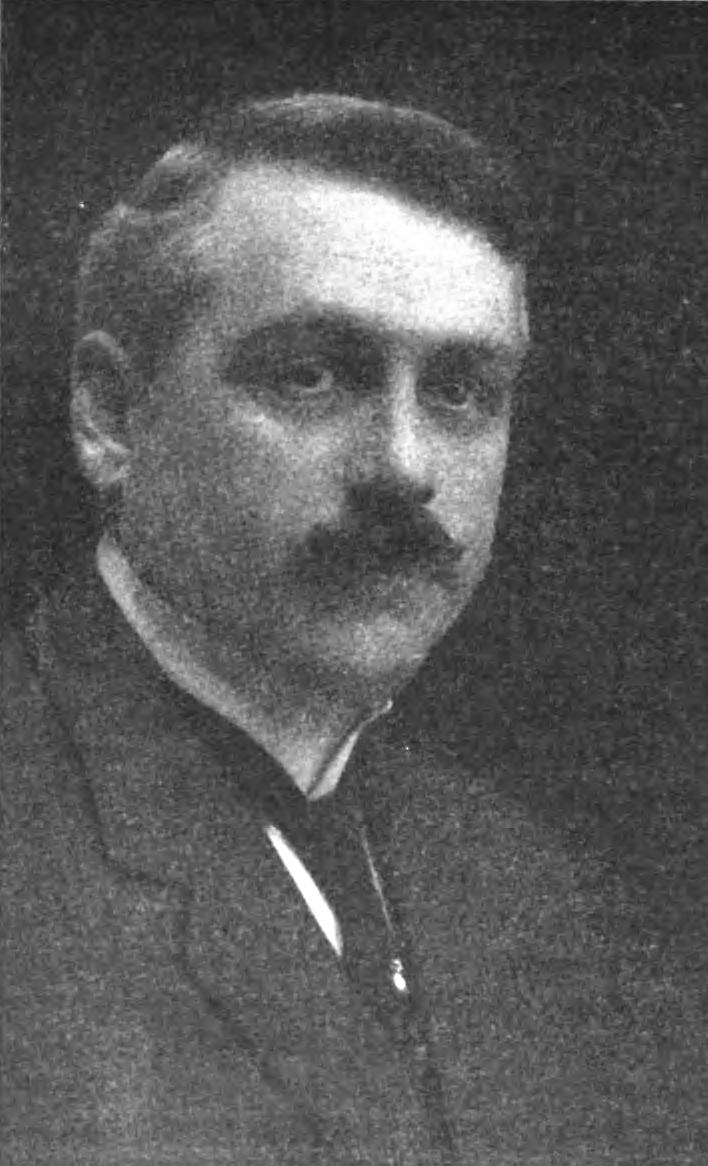
- Hammerstein in 1912
- Born: December 21, 1872; New York City, New York, U.S.
- Died: October 12, 1955 (aged 82); New York City, New York, U.S.
- Resting place: Woodlawn Cemetery, Bronx, New York City
- Occupations: Songwriter; Dramatist; Playwright; Theater manager Producer
- Years active: 1908–1930
- Spouse(s): Jean Allison; Grace Weir; Claire Nagle; Dorothy Dalton
- Children: Elaine Hammerstein
- Parent: Oscar Hammerstein I

Arthur Hammerstein (December 21, 1872 – October 12, 1955) was an American songwriter, dramatist, playwright and theater manager.

== Biography ==
Born and educated to a Jewish family in New York City, Hammerstein was the son of the theater impresario and composer Oscar Hammerstein I. Arthur started out as a bricklayer and plasterer, working on projects with his father including the Victoria Theater and Manhattan Opera House.

In 1908 Hammerstein started working on becoming a producer, signing Italian singer Luisa Tetrazzini to the family's Manhattan Center and negotiating with Otto Kahn before moving to London in 1910. While there Arthur and his father had a disagreement with money spending and Arthur vowed never to speak to him again. With his father's support, Arthur embarked on his first production, Naughty Marietta. Arthur's brother Willie Hammerstein died in June 1914, and Arthur took over management of the family's Victoria Theater. However, the theater was not financially viable and would be closed the next year. On its site, the first movie palace in Times Square, the Rialto Theatre, was built.

Hammerstein was the producer of the Rudolf Friml operettas The Firefly (1912), Katinka (1915) and Rose-Marie (1924), which he collaborated on with his nephew, Oscar Hammerstein II. Arthur produced almost 30 musicals in 40 years in show business.

During a performance of Tickle Me in 1920, Hammerstein was arrested for possessing what was thought to be whiskey during the Prohibition era, which later turned out to be iced tea. In 1930 Hammerstein was accused by a dance director George Haskell for assault but the charges were later dropped and the two reconciled. To search for better business opportunities, Hammerstein went to Hollywood to produce his one and only film The Lottery Bride, which was a failure and he returned to Broadway again. Hammerstein's last productions were Luana and Ballyhoo in 1930, which were considered failures. Hammerstein suffered bankruptcy in 1931 due to some musical failures and went into retirement.

In 1925-1927 Hammerstein had built what is now known as the Ed Sullivan Theater at 1697 Broadway in Manhattan.

Hammerstein made an appearance as himself in an episode of the film series Popular Science in 1949. He was one of the writers of the song "Because of You," a major hit (#1 for 10 weeks) for Tony Bennett in 1951. Hammerstein wrote the song in 1940. It was used in the film I Was an American Spy (1951).

== Personal life ==
Hammerstein was married four times. He married Jean Allison in 1893. They had a daughter, actress Elaine Hammerstein, and were divorced in 1910. He remarried to Grace Weir months later; they divorced in 1915. His marriage to actress Claire Nagle in 1919 ended with her death in 1921. In 1924 Hammerstein was married to silent film actress and stage personality Dorothy Dalton. Hammerstein died on October 12, 1955, from a heart attack at age 82.

He is interred at Woodlawn Cemetery in the Bronx, New York City.

The Arthur and Dorothy Dalton Hammerstein House, the couple's former residence in Beechhurst, Queens, is a New York City designated landmark.
