= Victoria Theatre (Hammerstein's) =

Theater in Manhattan, New York (1899–1915)

Coordinates: 40.75612°N 73.98700°W

- Hammerstein's
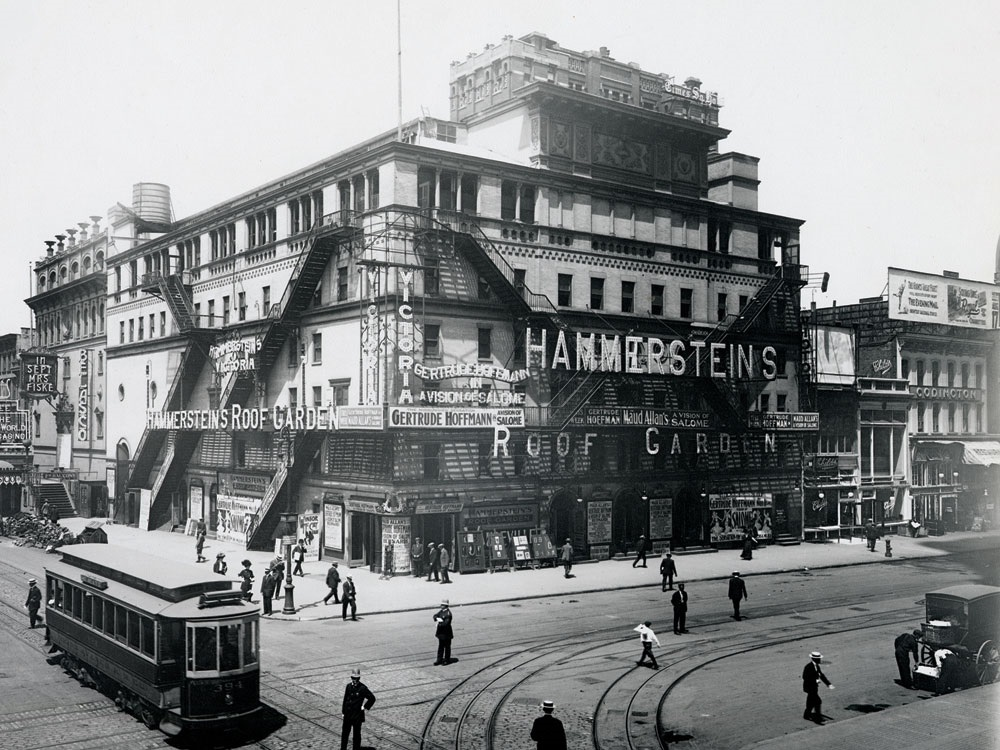
- Hammerstein’s
- Interactive map of Victoria Theatre
- Address: 42nd Street and Seventh Avenue; New York City; United States
- Owner: Oscar Hammerstein I
- Operator: Oscar and William Hammerstein
- Type: Broadway, Vaudeville

Construction
- Opened: 1899
- Demolished: 1915
- Architect: John B. McElfatrick

The Victoria Theatre was an American theatre located at the northwest corner of Seventh Avenue and 42nd Street, along New York City's Longacre Square (now Times Square). Opened by theatre mogul Oscar Hammerstein I in 1899, it was originally a Broadway theatre that presented legitimate theatre until it was converted in a vaudeville venue in 1904. The theatre was closely associated with the Paradise Roof Garden above it, and the two venues came to be known collectively as Hammerstein's. The Victoria closed in 1915.

== Construction ==
Undaunted by the failure of his father's massive Olympia Theatre, which Willie Hammerstein managed, he quickly secured the necessary funds to build the Victoria, purportedly named so in honor of his victory over his enemies. Due to budgetary constraints, the building crew was forced to take several cost-saving measures: the walls were filled with debris from the site’s demolished structure, Gilley Moore’s Market Stables; once erected, the plastered walls remained largely unadorned; and second-hand theatre seats lined the rows of the house. Despite the shortcuts, the press warmly greeted the grand opening; The New York Times deemed the décor “warm and comfortable,” free of anything “grotesque.”

== Legitimate theatre and vaudeville ==
A three-act burletta titled The Reign of Error, featuring the comedy duo of the Rogers Brothers, christened the new stage and ran for at least fifty performances. In the four years that followed, Hammerstein presented ten other productions, one of which, a flop titled Sweet Music, was rumored to be of his own authorship. Not one of these productions, however, was successful enough to solidify a formidable reputation for the fledgling theatre.

In 1904, Hammerstein's son Willie took over operations of the theatre, leaving Hammerstein more time to devote to his first love, grand opera. Willie took the drastic measure of turning the Victoria from legitimate theatre to vaudeville, and over the succeeding years, his risk proved tremendously profitable. Hammerstein's bore the distinction of being one of the few vaudeville houses in the city to operate independently of the virtual monopoly that B. F. Keith and E. F. Albee enjoyed. Headliners included such names as the Three Keatons, the Four Cohans, and the Seven Little Foys. In printed advertisements, the term “direct from Hammerstein’s” was testament to the quality of an act.

== Demise ==
In 1915, Hammerstein sold the theatre to Samuel Roxy Rothafel; however, the transfer of ownership was not a seamless one. A colorful anecdote had Hammerstein wielding a hammer to drive away the wrecking crew. The Times documented, “In Three Reels,” Hammerstein's sordid legal struggle to gain access to his former office.

Roxy wasted no time in gutting the building and demolishing the Seventh Avenue facade. The Rialto Theatre, a movie palace, opened soon thereafter. Nineteen years later, the entire structure was razed and replaced with offices, shops, and a smaller theater.

== See also ==
- List of Broadway theaters § Demolished Broadway theaters
