= Norman Pfeiffer =

American architect (1940–2023)

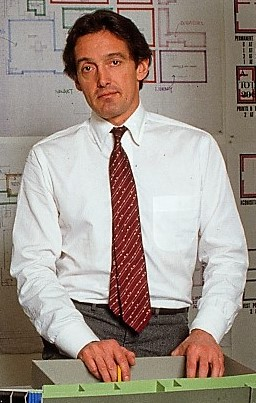
- At his office in 1981, with Los Angeles County Museum of Art drawings
- Born: Norman Henry Pfeiffer; November 13, 1940; Seattle, Washington, U.S.
- Died: August 23, 2023 (aged 82); Los Angeles, California, U.S.
- Education: University of Washington (BArch); Columbia University (MArch)
- Occupation: Architect
- Years active: 1965–2020
- Spouses: Jean Polacek Blacklow; Patricia Zohn (m. 1979)
- Children: 4
- Practice: Hardy Holzman Pfeiffer Associates; Pfeiffer Partners

Norman Henry Pfeiffer (November 13, 1940 – August 23, 2023) was an American architect whose career spanned over half a century. He was a partner in Hardy Holzman Pfeiffer Associates (HHPA). After that firm dissolved in 2004, he formed Pfeiffer Partners, with offices in Los Angeles and New York.

== Early life and education ==
Norman Henry Pfeiffer was born on November 13, 1940, in Seattle, where he was also raised. His grandfather was a contractor and Pfeiffer developed early interest in architecture. He received his professional B.Arch. degree cum laude from the University of Washington, in 1964. During his years in school he worked for Paul Hayden Kirk & Associates and Kirk, Wallace, McKinley & Associates. He earned his M.Arch. degree at Columbia University in 1965.

== Career ==
Following graduation, Pfeiffer went to work for Hugh Hardy & Associates, after searching a Manhattan phone book for an architecture firm to join. In 1967, he founded Hardy Holzman Pfeiffer Associates (HHPA) with Hugh Hardy and Malcolm Holzman. The firm grew and prospered for the next 37 years.

The firm initially designed residential buildings and schools, but gradually won larger more complex commissions. They became known for their innovative designs for performing arts facilities and for museums, as well as for preservation, renovation and adaptive reuse projects. In New York, their projects included restorations or expansions of the Brooklyn Children's Museum, Radio City Music Hall, and the Cooper Hewitt, Smithsonian Design Museum.

HHPA received over 100 national design awards, including the American Institute of Architects' Architecture Firm Award in 1981. All three partners became AIA Fellows; Pfeiffer was elevated to Fellowship in 1981.

In 1986, as the firm's practice was expanding nationally, Pfeiffer moved to Los Angeles to open an HHPA office in that city. In Los Angeles, the firm's work included renovations of the Los Angeles County Museum of Art and the Griffith Observatory.

Pfeiffer designed the master plan for the campus of Soka University of America in Aliso Viejo, California, which opened in 2001.

When HHPA dissolved in 2004, Pfeiffer restructured the Los Angeles office as Pfeiffer Partners, where he worked until retiring in 2020.

== Personal life and death ==
Pfeiffer's first marriage, to Jeanne Polacek Blacklow, ended in divorce. In 1979, he married journalist Patricia Zohn. He had two children from each marriage.

Pfeiffer lived in the Pacific Palisades neighborhood of Los Angeles. He died from heart failure at his home on August 23, 2023, at the age of 82.
