= Casa 74 =

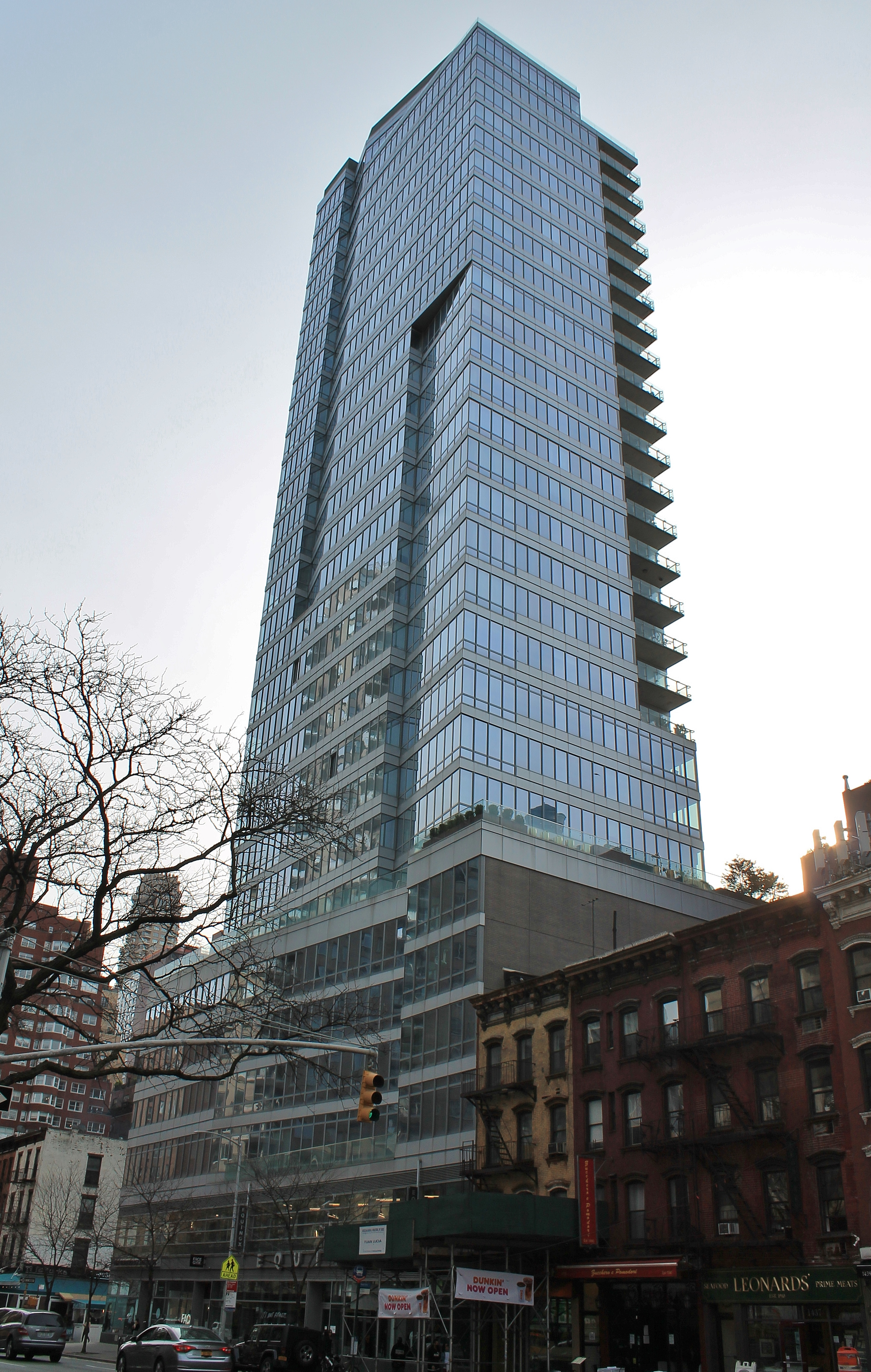
- 10 April 2021
- Interactive map of the Casa 74 area
- Alternative names: 255 East 74th Street

General information
- Type: condominium
- Location: 255 East 74th Street, Upper East Side, Manhattan, New York, United States
- Coordinates: 40°46′14″N 73°57′28″W
- Completed: 2008

Height
- Height: 338 feet (103 m)

Technical details
- Floor count: 30
- Floor area: 270,000-square-foot (25,000 m^{2})

Design and construction
- Architect: Hugh Hardy
- Architecture firm: H3 Hardy Collaboration Architecture; SLCE Architects
- Structural engineer: DeSimone Consulting Engineers

Website
- 255east74.com

Casa 74, also known as 255 East 74th Street, is a condominium building at Second Avenue and East 74th Street on the Upper East Side of Manhattan, New York City. The 30-story building has 87 apartments and was developed by World-Wide Holdings Corporation. It was designed by Hugh Hardy's H3 Hardy Collaboration Architecture together with SLCE Architects, and built in 2008.

The building contains primarily three-to-five bedroom apartments, duplexes, and penthouses, with 10-foot (3.0 m) ceilings. The largest apartments are 3,500-square-foot (330 m^{2}).

The lower floors of the building house a 42,000-square-foot (3,900 m^{2}) Equinox gym. The building includes a 2,400-square-foot (220 m^{2}) children’s pavilion, and a private 1,500-square-foot (140 m^{2}) garden.

In 2008, apartments in the building sold for prices ranging up to $4,000-per-square-foot. In 2009, a penthouse was purchased for $12.98 million. Also in 2009, the developer rented out five of the building's apartments, at $13,000-per-month for three-bedroom apartments, and $18,000-per-month for a four-bedroom apartment.

Poet John Giorno lived at the address, when a small carriage house was located on the property, before the current building was built.
