= Hardy Holzman Pfeiffer Associates =

American architecture firm

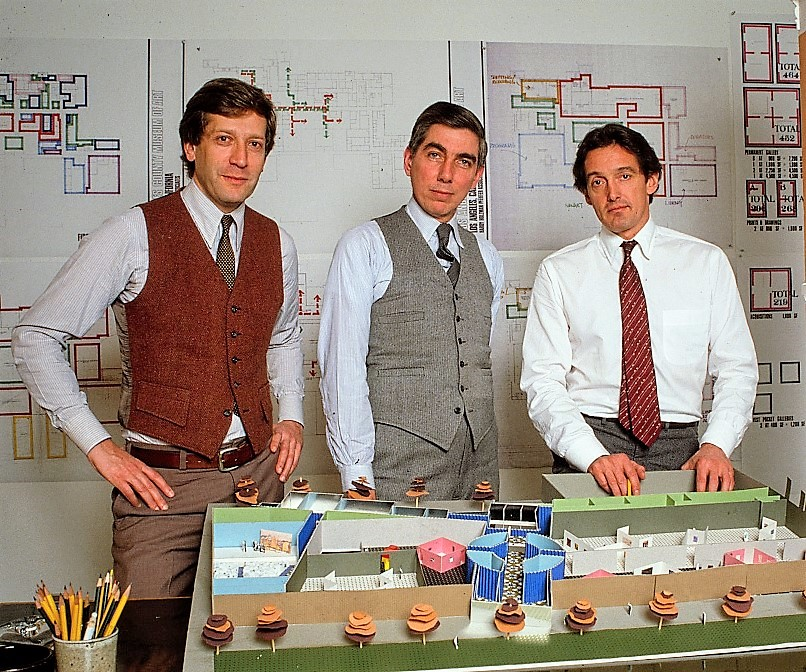
- Left to right: Malcolm Holzman, with Los Angeles County Museum of Art drawingsHugh Hardy, Norman Pfeiffer, NYC office, 1981
- Type: Architecture firm
- Industry: Architecture
- Founded: 1967; 59 years ago
- Founders: Hugh Hardy, Malcolm Holzman, Norman Pfeiffer
- Defunct: August 2004; 21 years ago
- Successor: H3 Hardy Collaboration Architecture, Holzman Moss Bottino Architecture, Pfeiffer Partners Architects
- Headquarters: New York City, New York; later also in Los Angeles, United States
- Products: Cultural and public buildings, historic preservation

Hardy Holzman Pfeiffer Associates' (HHPA) was an internationally recognized American architecture firm with offices in New York and Los Angeles. Established by Hugh Hardy, Malcolm Holzman and Norman Pfeiffer in 1967 in New York, HHPA was noted for its innovative public buildings, and received over 100 national design awards, including the American Institute of Architects' Architecture Firm Award in 1981. After the firm disbanded in August 2004, each of the partners established a successor firm.

== Major projects ==
All buildings are in Manhattan, New York City unless otherwise indicated:

- 1971: Dance Theatre of Harlem, conversion from garage to dance theatre
- 1973: Columbus Occupational Health Association, now Cummins headquarters, Columbus, Indiana
- 1976: Andrew Carnegie Mansion, now the Cooper-Hewitt National Design Museum, conversion from mansion to museum
- 1982: Joyce Theatre, converted from movie theater to dance theatre
- 1985: Rizzoli Bookstore, restoration and remodeling of former Sohmer Piano showroom
- 1987: Brooklyn Academy of Music Harvey Theater, renovation, Brooklyn, New York City
- 1988: Alaska Center for the Performing Arts, Anchorage, Alaska
- 1994: Everett Center Dance Theatre of Harlem, new building
- 1995: New Victory Theater, restoration and remodeling
- 1996: B. Altman and Company Building Fifth Avenue, exterior restoration
- 1996: St. Jean Baptiste Roman Catholic Church, restoration
- 1997: New Amsterdam Theater, restoration
- 1997: Look Building 488 Madison Avenue, renovation
- 1998: Vivian Beaumont Theatre, lobby remodeled
- 1999: Radio City Music Hall, interior renovation
- 2000: Central Synagogue (Congregation Ahavath Chesed), restoration
- 2004: Marie P. DeBartolo Performing Arts Center, Notre Dame, Indiana, 2004
