= New Amsterdam Theatre =

Broadway theater in Manhattan, New York

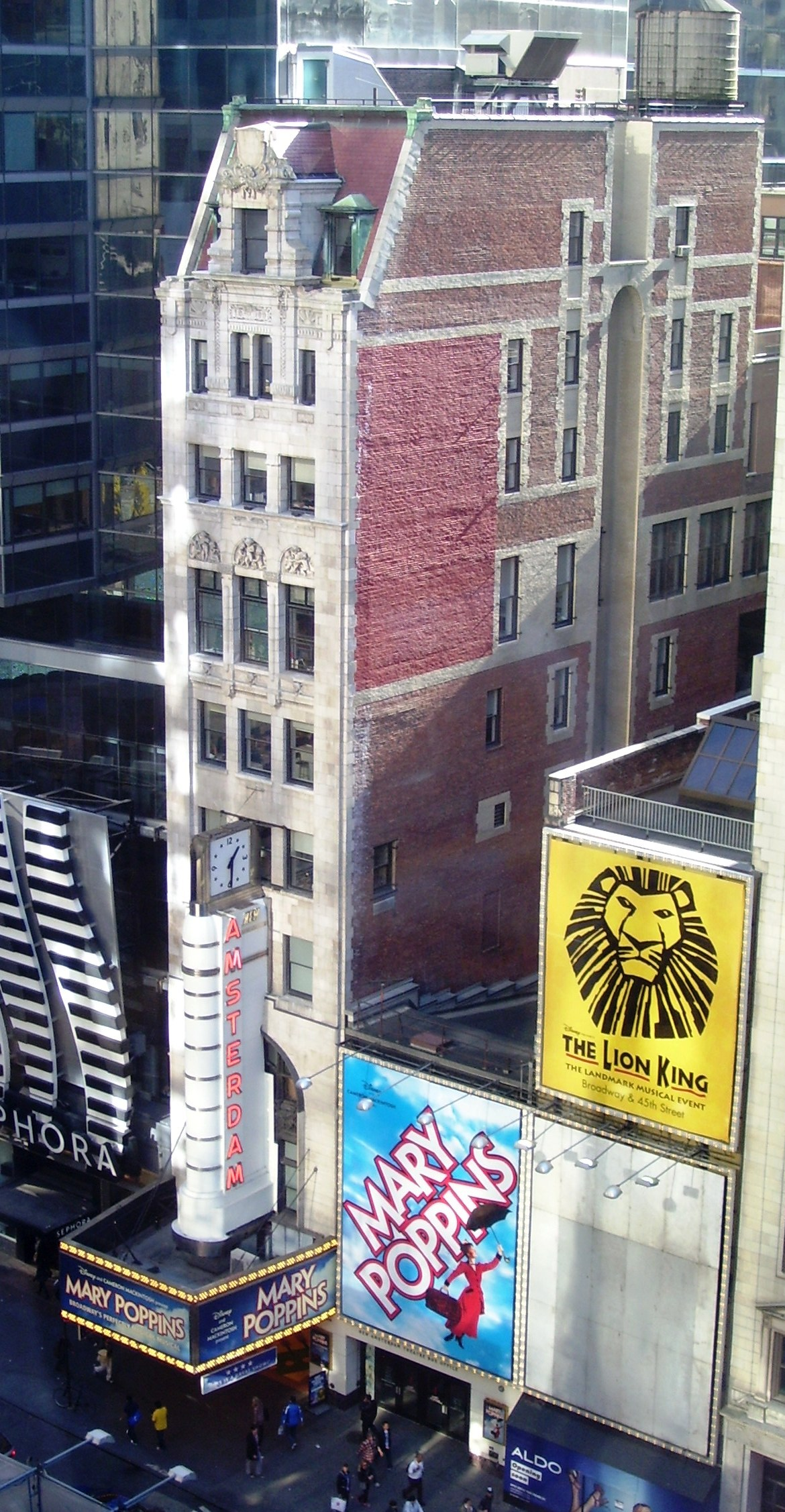
- Seen in 2011 from across 42nd Street
- Interactive map of New Amsterdam Theatre
- Address: 214 West 42nd Street; Manhattan, New York; United States
- Coordinates: 40°45′22″N 73°59′16″W
- Owner: Government of New York City
- Operator: Disney Theatrical Group
- Capacity: 1,702
- Type: Broadway
- Production: Aladdin

Construction
- Opened: October 26, 1903 (123 years ago)
- Rebuilt: 1995–1997
- Years active: 1903–1937, 1997–present
- Architect: Herts & Tallant
- Structural engineer: DeSimone Consulting Engineers
- General contractor: George A. Fuller Construction Co.

Website
- newamsterdamtheatre.com

Site notes
- Architectural styles: Beaux-Arts, Art Nouveau

U.S. National Register of Historic Places
- Designated: January 10, 1980
- Reference no.: 80002664
- Designated entity: Theater

New York State Register of Historic Places
- Designated: June 23, 1980
- Reference no.: 06101.001206
- Designated entity: Theater

New York City Landmark
- Designated: October 23, 1979
- Reference no.: 1026
- Designated entity: Facade

New York City Landmark
- Designated: October 23, 1979
- Reference no.: 1027
- Designated entity: Interior

The New Amsterdam Theatre is a Broadway theater at 214 West 42nd Street, at the southern end of Times Square, in the Theater District of Manhattan in New York City, New York, U.S. One of the first Broadway venues to open in the Times Square neighborhood, the New Amsterdam was built from 1902 to 1903 to designs by Herts & Tallant. The theater is operated by Disney Theatrical Productions and has 1,702 seats across three levels. Both the Beaux-Arts exterior and the Art Nouveau interior of the building are New York City landmarks, and the building is on the National Register of Historic Places.

The theater's main entrance is through a 10-story wing facing north on 42nd Street, while the auditorium is in the rear, facing south on 41st Street. The facade on 42nd Street is made of gray limestone and was originally ornamented with sculptural detail; the rest of the facade is made of brick. The lobby within the office wing leads to a set of ornamental foyers, a reception room, and men's and women's lounges. The elliptical auditorium contains two balconies cantilevered above a ground-level orchestra. Above the main auditorium is a now-disused roof theater, which opened in 1904 and also served as a studio. The theater has a steel frame and was designed with advanced mechanical systems for its time.

The New Amsterdam Theatre was named for the Dutch settlement of New Amsterdam, the precursor to New York City. Klaw and Erlanger operated the venue for more than two decades after its opening on October 26, 1903. From 1913 to 1927, the New Amsterdam was the home of the Ziegfeld Follies, whose producer, Florenz Ziegfeld Jr., maintained an office in the building and operated the theater on the roof. Erlanger bought Klaw's ownership interest in 1927, and the New Amsterdam was converted into a movie theater in 1937, in which capacity it served until 1983. The Nederlander Organization tried to redevelop the theater for ten years as part of the 42nd Street Development Project. It was then leased by The Walt Disney Company and renovated by Hardy Holzman Pfeiffer from 1995 to 1997. After Disney took over the New Amsterdam's operation, the theater hosted the musical The Lion King, followed by Mary Poppins and Aladdin.

== Site ==
The New Amsterdam Theatre is at 214 West 42nd Street, between Seventh Avenue and Eighth Avenue near the southern end of Times Square, in the Theater District of Midtown Manhattan in New York City, New York, U.S. The land lot is irregularly shaped and covers 19,250 ft^{2} (1,788 m^{2}), extending 200 ft (61 m) between its two frontages on 41st and 42nd Streets. The main frontage on 42nd Street (including the box office) measures 75 ft (23 m) wide, and the 41st Street frontage measures 150 ft (46 m) wide. Originally, the 42nd Street frontage was only 25 ft (7.6 m) wide; the developers, Abraham L. Erlanger and Marcus Klaw, wanted the more prominent 42nd Street frontage as the main entrance. The lots comprising the site had previously been owned by Samuel McMillan and the Johnson estate.

The city block includes 5 Times Square to the east and the Candler Building, Madame Tussauds New York, Empire Theatre, and Eleven Times Square to the west. The Todd Haimes Theatre, Times Square Theatre, Lyric Theatre, New Victory Theater, and 3 Times Square are across 42nd Street to the north, and the Nederlander Theatre is to the south. An entrance to the New York City Subway's Times Square–42nd Street station, served by the 1, 2, 3, 7, <7>, N, Q, R, W, and S trains, is next to the theater.

The surrounding area is part of Manhattan's Theater District and contains many Broadway theaters. In the first two decades of the 20th century, eleven venues for legitimate theater were built within one block of West 42nd Street between Seventh and Eighth Avenues. The New Amsterdam, Harris, Liberty, Eltinge, and Lew Fields theaters occupied the south side of the street. The original Lyric and Apollo theaters (combined into the current Lyric Theatre), as well as the Times Square, Victory, Selwyn (now Todd Haimes), and Victoria theaters, occupied the north side. These venues were mostly converted to movie theaters by the 1930s, and many of them had been relegated to showing pornography by the 1970s.

== Design ==
The New Amsterdam Theatre was designed by architects Herts & Tallant and developed for Klaw and Erlanger from 1902 to 1903. It was built by the George A. Fuller Company. The facade is designed in the Beaux-Arts style with Art Nouveau elements, and the theater's interior is an early example of architectural Art Nouveau in New York City. Decoration was carried out by more than a dozen artists. The decorative scheme predominantly depicted three topics: the history of New York City prior to 1903, including its original history as the Dutch colony of New Amsterdam; the history of theater; and the floral and foliage motifs often seen in theaters. The design also included elements of classicism.

The theater consists of a 10-story tower with offices, on the narrow 42nd Street frontage, (Note: Margolies 1997, p. 117, gives a conflicting figure of 11 stories.) and an auditorium at the rear, on 41st Street. The tower was developed to house Klaw and Erlanger's booking activities. The two sections are connected by a one-story passageway at ground level. The New Amsterdam Theatre's building housed two theaters when it opened: the main 41st Street auditorium as well as a rooftop theater.

=== Facade ===
The primary elevation of the facade, on 42nd Street, is made of gray limestone with a steeply pitched roof made of red tile. The theater's entrance is a triple-height segmental arch; the stories above contain offices. The office wing measures 150 ft (46 m) tall. The 41st Street elevation contains the stage doors and is clad with plain brick, since the architects thought the public would seldom see that elevation. The side walls of the office wing on 42nd Street are also constructed of brick because the architects had anticipated that high-rise buildings would be constructed on either side. Fire escapes are placed across the theater wing's exterior on 41st Street.

==== Theater entrance ====
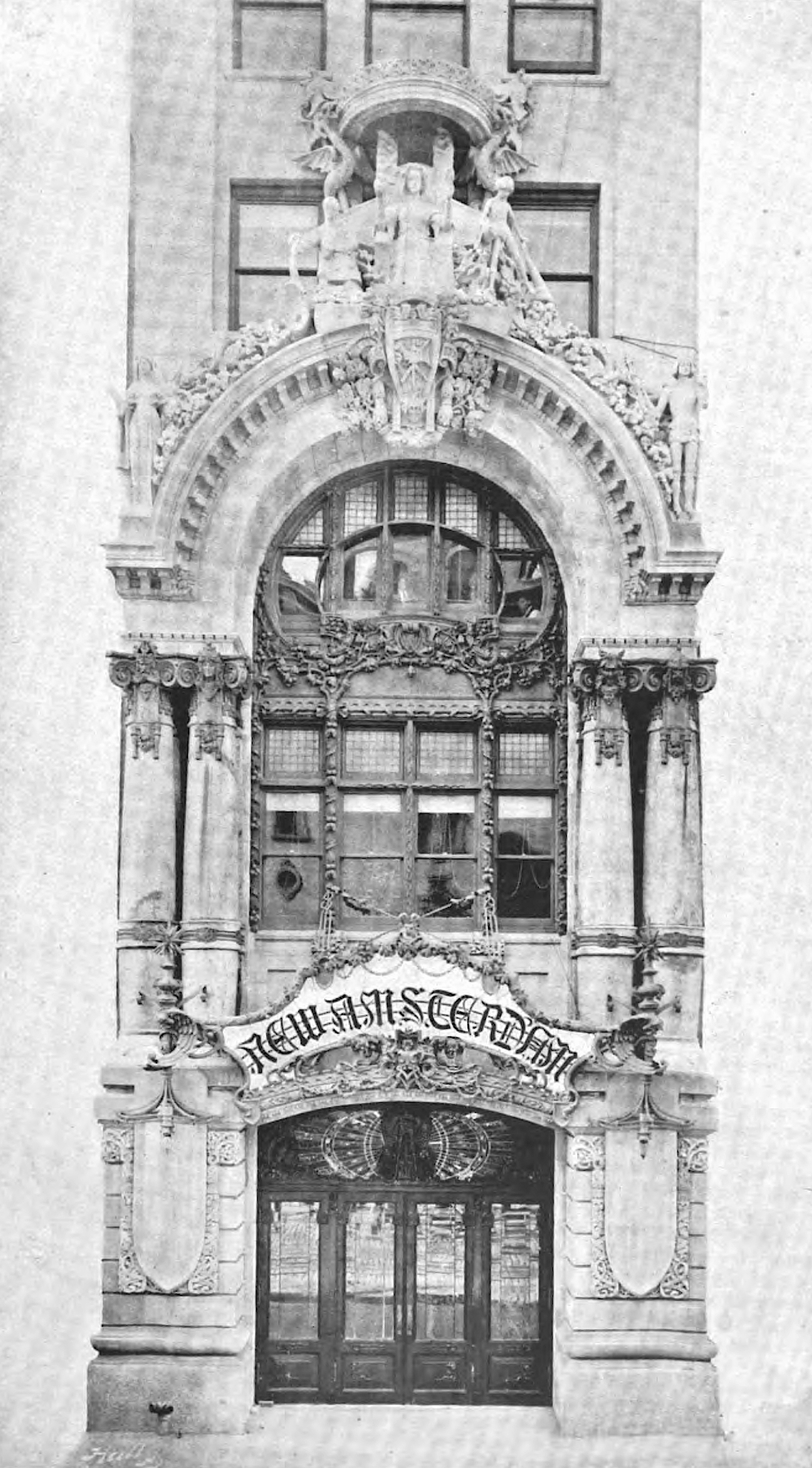
The original entrance arch

On 42nd Street, the triple-height arch had rusticated stone piers on either side. The original entrance was a double door with transom windows made of leaded glass, above which was a sign with the theater's name. The sign was ornately decorated and, at night, was illuminated by lights on the upper stories. The second and third stories contain bronze-framed windows with flower and vine decorations. The original doors were removed around 1937, but the second- and third-story windows still exist. The entrance vestibule, originally immediately inside the doors, contained green tiles and relief panels by St. John Issing. The vestibule was reconfigured as an outdoor space when the original entrance doors were removed; it contains a ticket booth on its western side.

The arch at the second and third stories was initially highly decorated, but the decorations were all removed in 1937 to make way for a marquee. At the second floor were yellow-and-gray Montreal marble columns. These were topped by bronze capitals designed by Enid Yandell, which contained four heads depicting the ages of drama. The top of the arch at the third story originally had a keystone carved by Grendellis and Ricci, with a garland depicting oak, laurel, and ivy. Above was a cornice with modillions, as well as a group of sculptures by George Gray Barnard, depicting five figures linked by garlands. Cupid (symbolizing love comedy) and a woman stood on one side of the central figure, a female personification of drama; Pierrot (symbolizing musical farce) and a knight stood on the other side.

==== Office stories ====
The office stories along the 42nd Street elevation are three bays wide. The fourth through sixth stories contain simple fenestration, but the seventh-story windows are taller than those on the three preceding stories. On the seventh story there is a frieze with winged heads below it, as well as pilasters topped by capitals with floral decorations. Grendellis and Ricci designed terracotta panels for the arched pediments above the seventh-story windows, which represent dance, declamation, and song. At the ninth story, decorated pilasters flank the windows, and a frieze runs above the windows, with the year "1903" carved into it.

The tenth story contains a central projecting dormer, containing a decorated pediment, as well as a smaller dormer in either of the side bays. The peak of the central dormer contains a mask with garlands. It was originally flanked by representations of drama and music. These figures held up a shield silhouetted against the sky. Herts & Tallant did not include a cornice on the facade, since they felt such a feature was unsuitable for office buildings.

=== Interior ===
The New Amsterdam Theatre was among the first non-high-rise buildings in New York City with a steel superstructure. The structural frame is made of 2,000 short tons (1,800 long tons; 1,800 t) of steel. According to a 1903 source, the frame is made of approximately 270,000 steel pieces, which required about 7,500 engineering drawings. There were originally also 57 cantilevers and 38 electric lifts (including elevators). The side walls of the office wing are non-bearing walls. The tower wing was used as offices for Klaw and Erlanger and later Florenz Ziegfeld Jr.

The theater was also mechanically advanced for its time, with heating, cooling, and vacuum-cleaning systems, as well as a fireproof structural frame. The auditorium alone had a volume of 400,000 ft^{3} (11,000 m^{3}) and was indirectly heated by fans in the subbasement. The ventilation system included air plenums on 41st Street, a 10-foot (3.0 m) fan, a silk filter, and a heater that moistened the air to natural levels of humidity. The air could be completely changed in ten minutes. Air was distributed through the floors and walls, and it was exhausted through disc fans above the auditorium. Three telephone systems were installed to allow communications between different parts of the theater. These mechanical systems were completely replaced between 1995 and 1997. The new mechanical systems do not intrude upon the original design, except for a light grid above the proscenium of the auditorium.

==== Lobby ====
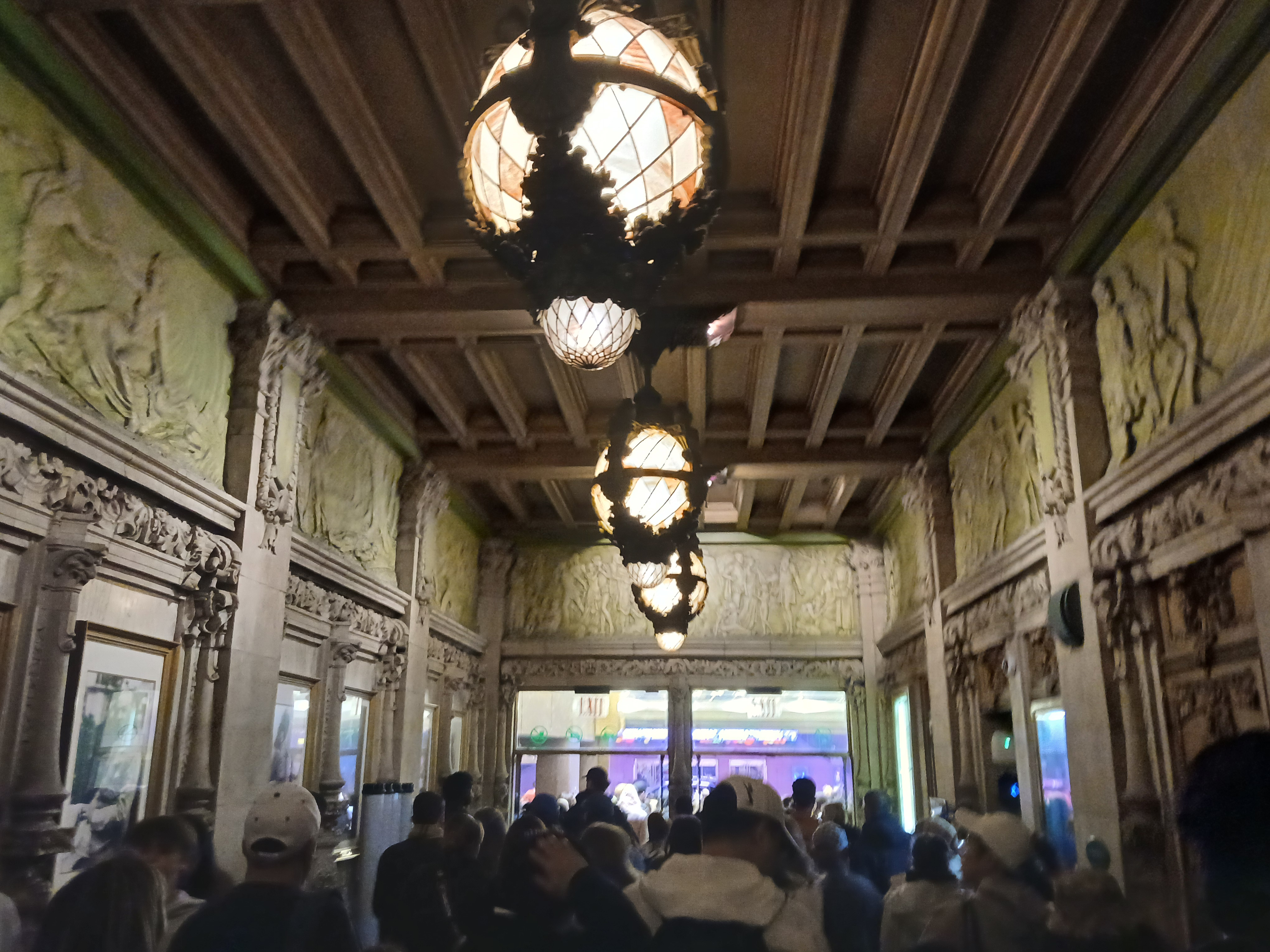
The original lobby, looking north

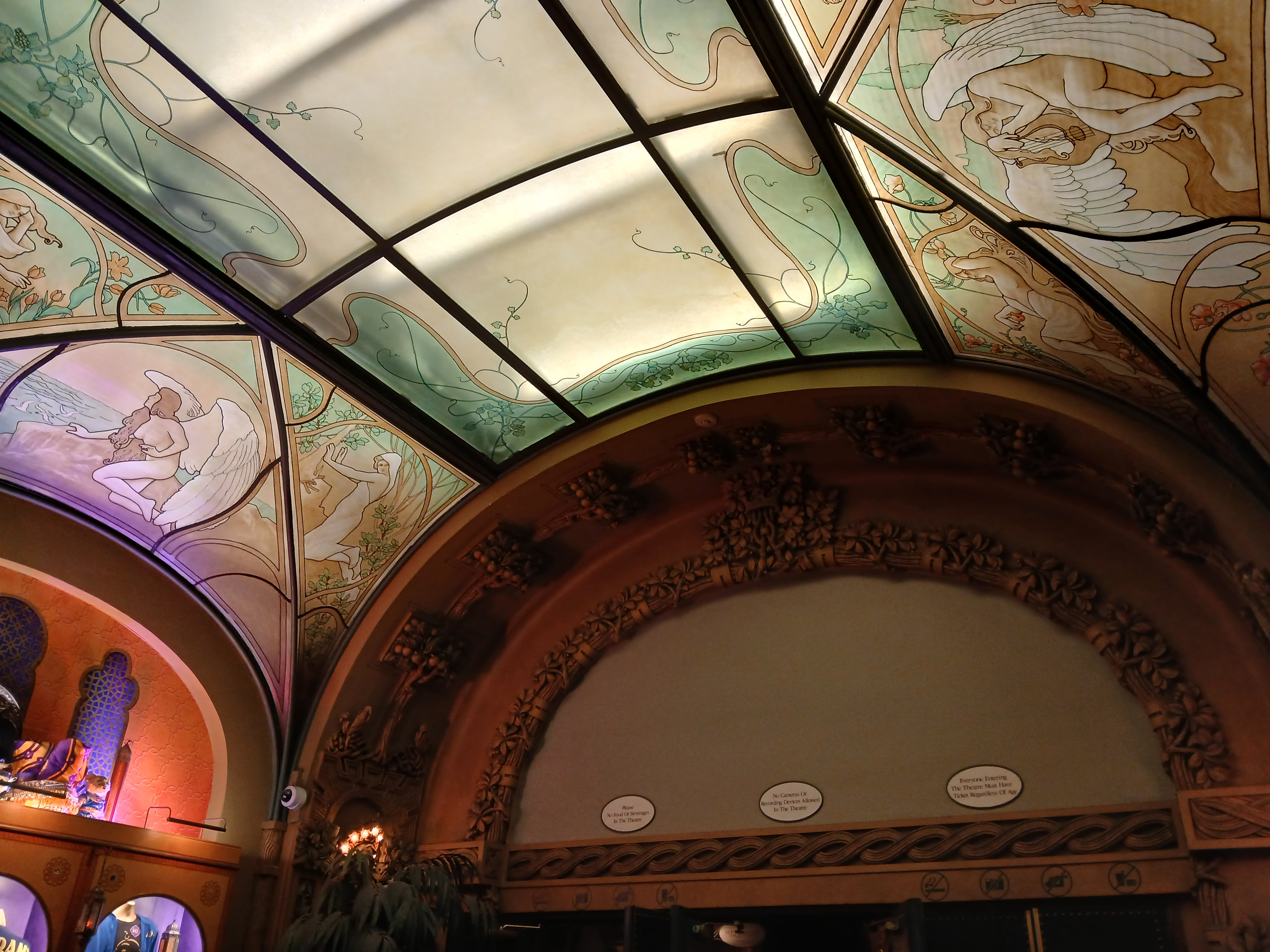
The arch and stained-glass ceiling above the south wall of the auditorium's entrance foyer

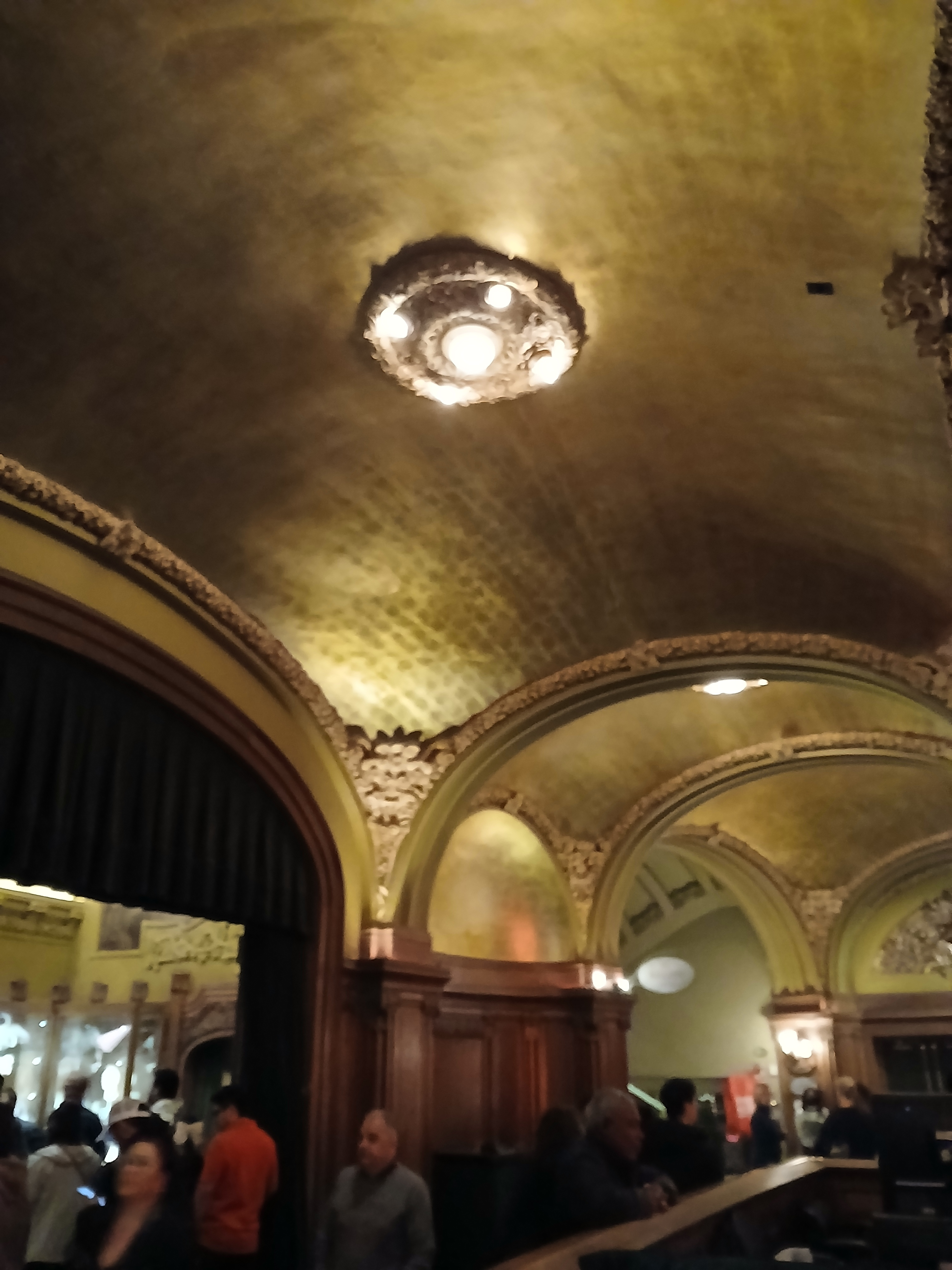
The vaulted promenade ceiling

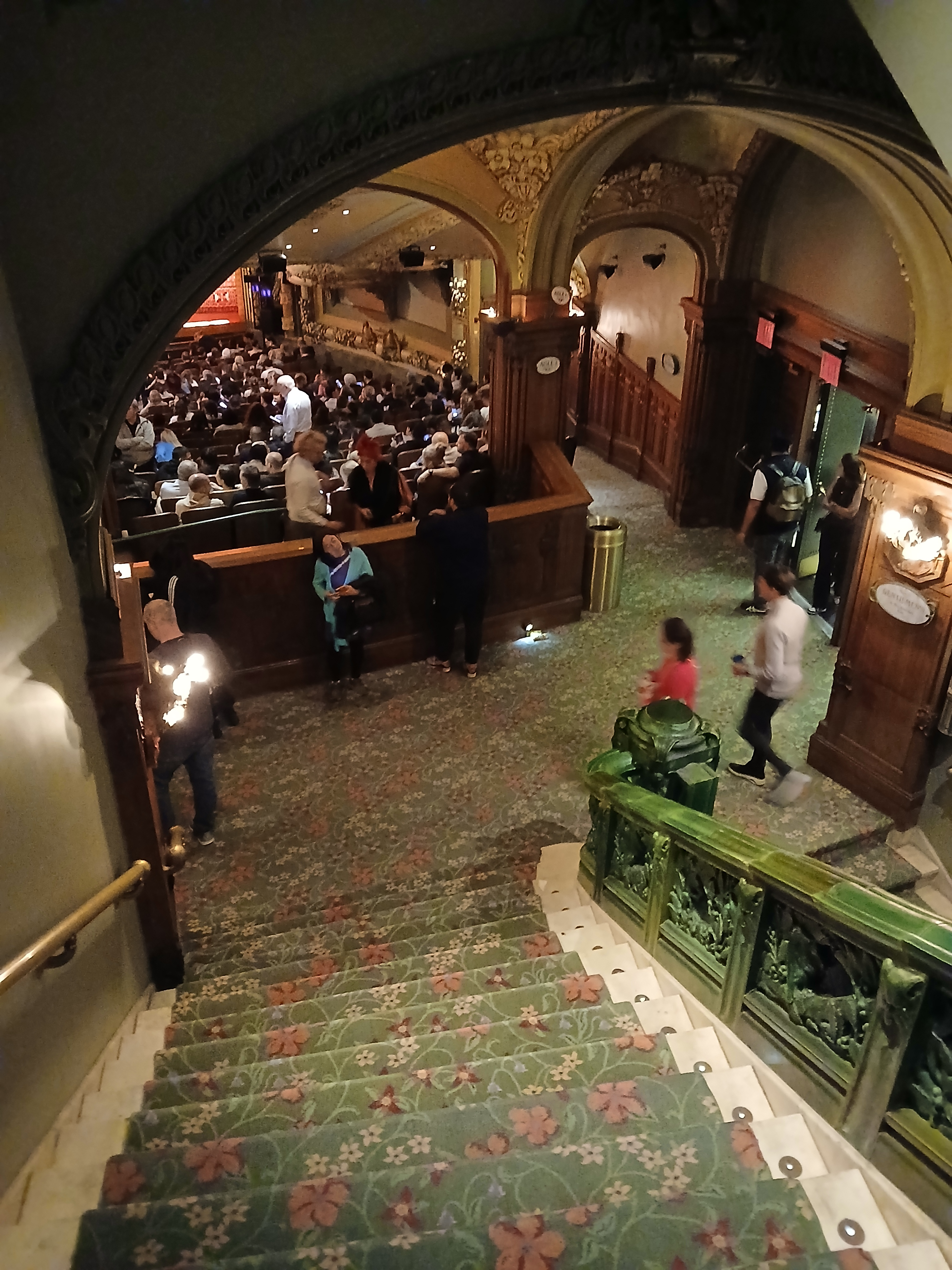
The northern (right-hand) stairs from the first balcony to the orchestra level

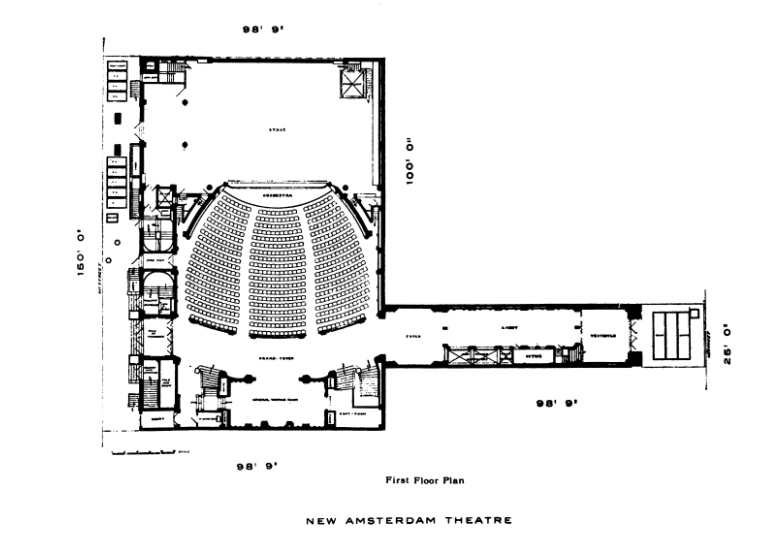
The first floor plan, with west at top. At right (north), the entrance vestibule leads to the narrow lobby and the auditorium's entrance foyer. At left (south), from top to bottom, are the auditorium, promenade foyer, and general reception room.

Leading from the 42nd Street entrance vestibule is the lobby, which runs under the office wing; the space contains curving Art Nouveau-style floral motifs. The eastern (or left) wall contains bronze office and elevator doors. The remainder of the wall contains marble panels, separated by terracotta pilasters that were designed by Neumark of Bremen and carved by Grendellis and Ricci. There are mirrored panels above the marble on the western (right) wall.

Above the walls are twelve terracotta panels designed by Roland Hinton Perry, which form a frieze. Those on the eastern wall depict scenes from Shakespeare's plays, and those on the western wall depict scenes from operas by Richard Wagner. A scene from Faust is depicted over the entrance on the north, and Greek drama is depicted over the doorway to the auditorium foyer on the south. The coffered ceiling is made of wood and originally contained plaster-and-leaded-glass chandeliers, which have since been replaced by simpler fixtures. The elevators lead to the auditorium's mezzanine and upper balcony levels.

==== Foyers ====
The lobby leads south to the auditorium's entrance foyer. Within the north wall of the foyer, above the doors from the lobby, is a semicircular plaster relief by Hugh Tallant, depicting progress. This design includes a blue-and-gold representation of a woman with flower and leaf decorations on either side. Perry designed full-size panels for the foyer walls, which depicted the colony of New Amsterdam in the 17th century as well as a more modern view of New York City in the 19th century. (Note: National Park Service 1980, p. 4, wrote that the main panel depicted the 1900s.) The panels were subsequently removed when refreshment stands were added, and mirrors were installed in their place. The ceiling of the foyer contained a stained-glass dome, originally named "The Song of the Flowers". (Note: National Park Service 1980, p. 4, referred to the dome as "A Song of Flowers".) The stained glass vault was replaced with a vault painted gold.

The south wall of the entrance foyer leads to a promenade foyer at the rear of the auditorium, which spans the auditorium's width. The promenade foyer contains a groin vault with floral moldings. The foyer contains a wood balustrade overlooking the parterre orchestra level of the auditorium to the west. A sylvan-themed relief by Issing is at the southern end of the promenade foyer, leading to 41st Street.

On the east wall of the promenade foyer, there are two sets of staircases, which lead up to the balconies and down to the lounges. The stairs are made of green-veined Maryland Cremo marble. Running alongside the stairs are green terracotta balustrades made with faience glazing, containing panels with vines, flowers, and animals. At each landing are oak-wood newel posts, with figures inspired by Shakespearean characters. The staircase decorations have been attributed to Norwegian architect Thorbjorn Bassoe.

==== Rooms ====
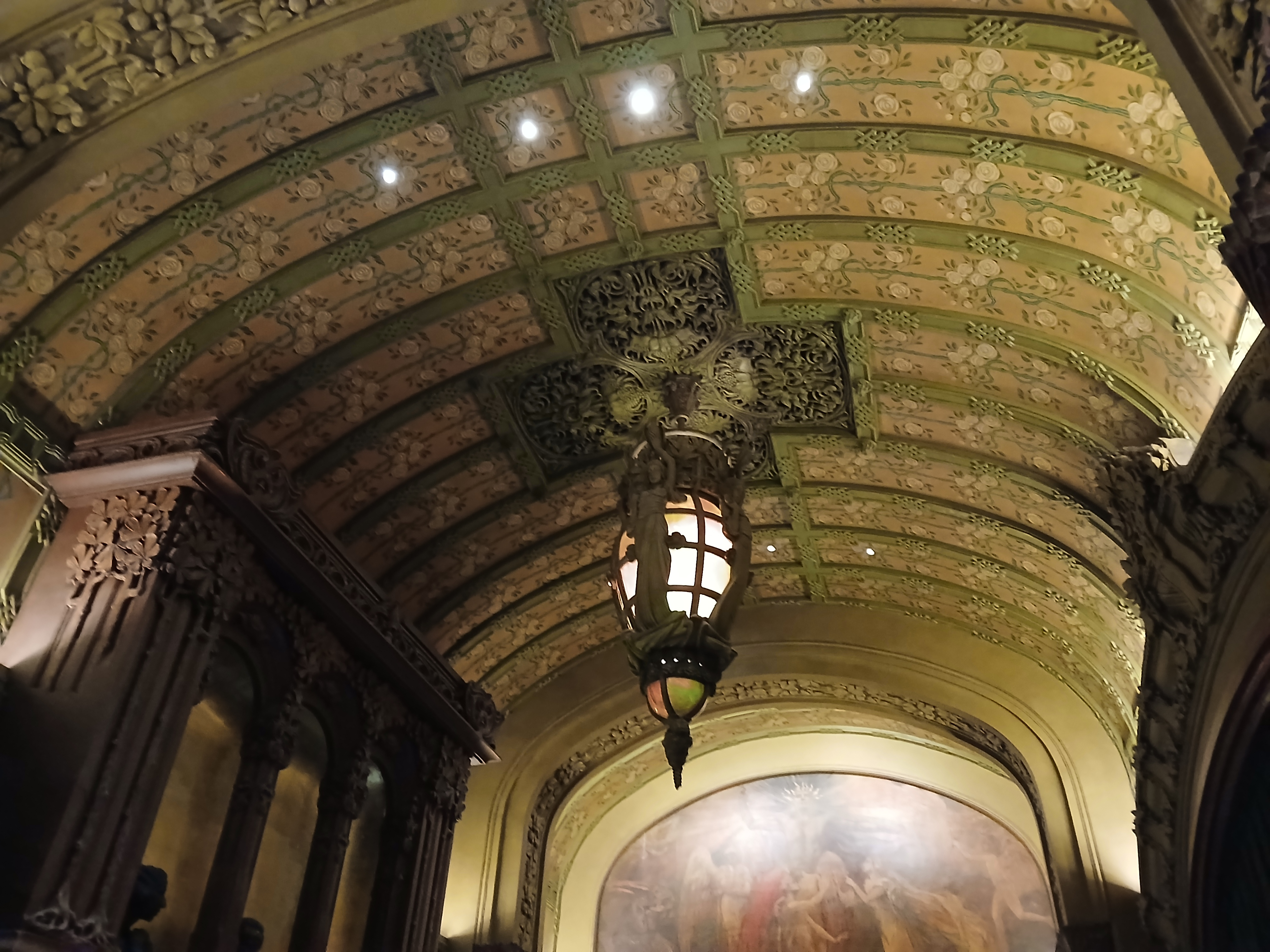
The general reception room behind the auditorium

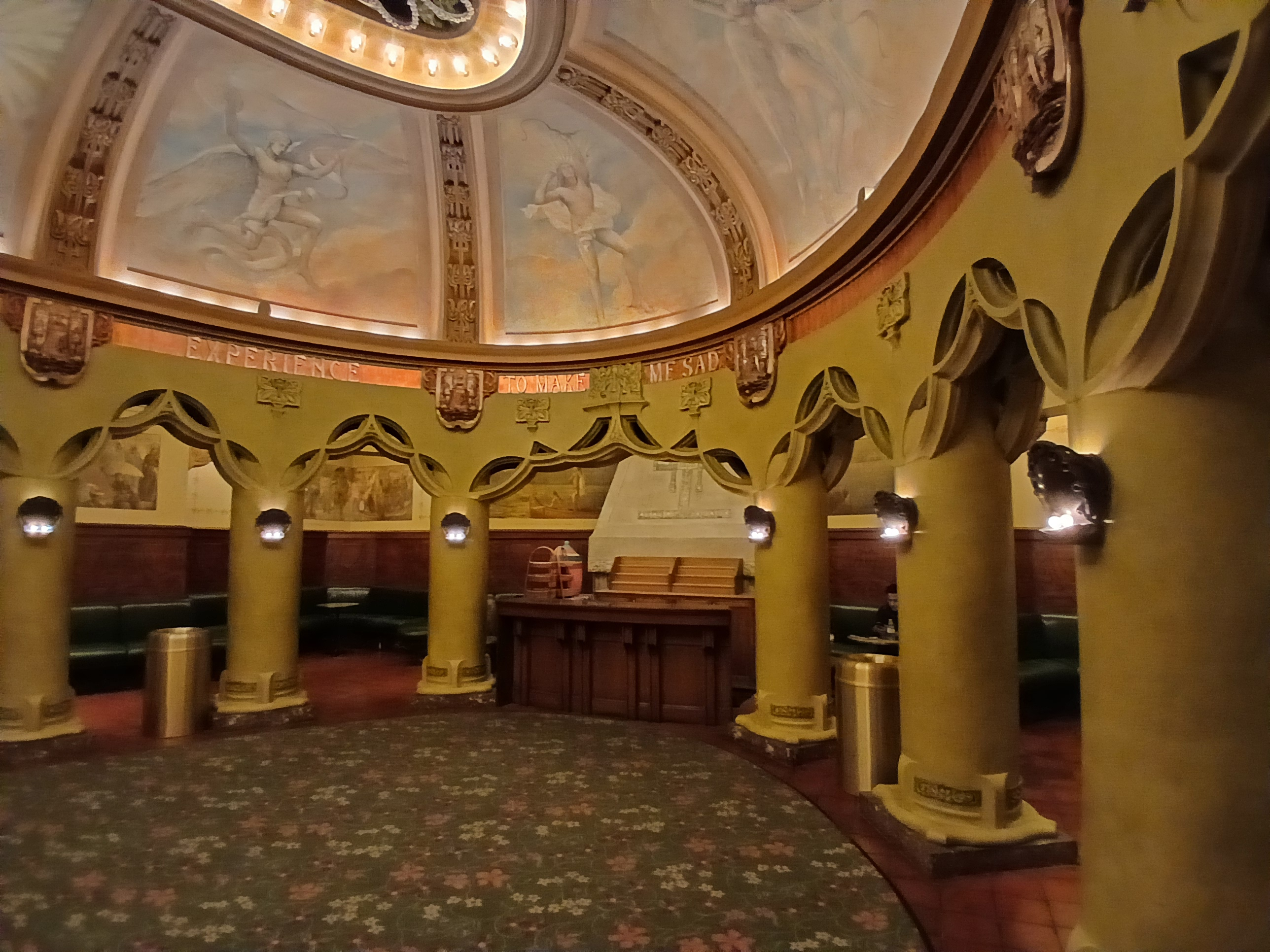
The smoking room in the basement

From the rear of the first-floor promenade foyer is an arch leading to the general reception room, a green-and-gold space with oak paneling. The general reception room measures 50 ft × 30 ft (15.2 m × 9.1 m). The arch was originally flanked by marble fountains. On the north and south walls, George Peixotto designed two symbolic paintings entitled "Inspiration" and "Creation". The rear (east) wall of the reception room has a fireplace with a Caen stone and Irish marble mantel, also decorated with curving foliate patterns. The niches above the fireplaces originally contained busts depicting poets Homer, Shakespeare, and Virgil. The paneling is 12 ft (3.7 m) high and has built-in seats and stylized curved trees. Originally, 38 medallions with painted portraits, designed by William Frazee Strunz and depicting "Lovers of Historical Drama" were embedded into the paneling. The reception room's vaulted ceiling and arches are decorated with floral moldings.

The women's and men's lounges are both directly below the reception room: the women's lounge to the south and the men's lounge to the north. The women's lounge originally had pink carved reliefs of roses. The ceiling of the women's lounge depicted a rose with personifications of the five senses, as well as depictions of the figures Eros, Ganymede, and Jupiter. The men's lounge was a smoking room with depictions of various figures, which New York Plaisance magazine referred to as "notably artistic and interesting".

The old rectangular smoking room, also called the New Amsterdam Room for its decorations, is between the lounges. Stairs descend 3 ft (0.91 m) from the lounges to the room. The space measures 70 ft × 40 ft (21 m × 12 m). The room's floor is made of Welsh quarry tile and the walls have brown Flemish-oak paneling and upholstered seats. The upper portions of the walls contain sixteen murals attributed to Edward Simmons and R. W. Finn, which depict New York City's historical development. There is a fireplace at one corner of the room, with a mantel of Caen stone and gray-washed brick. The ceiling is a segmental dome, supported by an oval colonnade of plain, round Caen-stone columns. Eight allegorical murals by Peixotto decorate the dome. There is a bronze grille representing a winged youth, at the dome's apex. An inscription surrounds the dome's base, with the words "I had rather a fool to make me merry than experience to make me sad", a line from the Shakespeare comedy As You Like It. The old smoking room was converted into a bar during the 1990s.

==== Auditorium ====
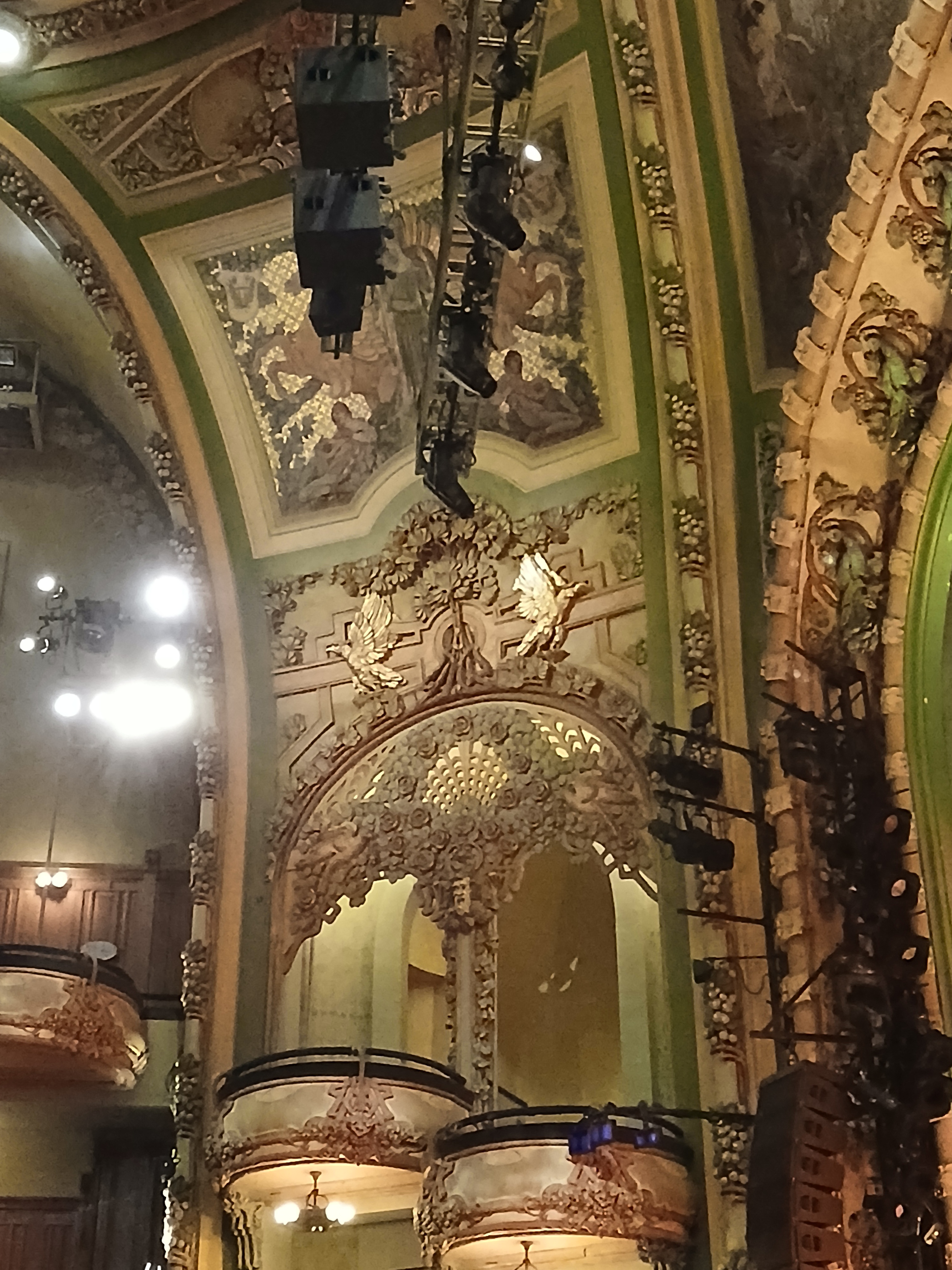
Side view of left-hand box seats

The auditorium is at the south end of the building and is elliptical in plan, with curved walls, a domed ceiling, and two balcony levels over the orchestra level. The space measures 86 ft (26 m) wide, and it is 90 ft (27 m) long between the stage apron and the reception room's wall. The dome rises 80 ft (24 m) above the floor of the orchestra. The original color scheme was described in The New York Times as consisting of "tender pinks, mauves, lilacs, red and gold". These decorations were bright to compensate for the original direct current lighting system, which was dim. The modern decorative scheme contains reproductions of many of the original decorations with a subdued color palette. A double wall surrounds the whole auditorium and contains a fire gallery measuring 15 ft (4.6 m) wide. The auditorium held around 1,550 seats in its original configuration. (Note: Stern, Fishman & Tilove 2006, p. 705, says the auditorium had 1,537 seats.) After its reopening in 1997, the auditorium had 1,814 seats; as of 2022, the New Amsterdam has a seating capacity of 1,702. (Note: According to seating charts, the orchestra has 698 seats, the first balcony has 586 seats, and the second balcony has 418 seats.) There are wheelchair-accessible seating areas in the orchestra and in the first balcony (also called the mezzanine).

===== Seating areas =====
Unusually for theaters of the time, the balconies are cantilevered from the structural framework, which eliminated the need for columns that blocked sightlines. The second balcony is recessed from the mezzanine and is suspended directly from the ceiling via tension rods. Also unlike in older theaters, which often had horseshoe-shaped balconies that wrapped around the sides and rear of the auditorium, the New Amsterdam's balconies only stretch across the rear wall. At the orchestra and balcony levels, the lower sections of the walls have carved-oak wainscoting. The original seats had walnut-stained seatbacks without cushions, which became known as "Amsterdam backs" when they were used in other theaters.

The auditorium initially had twelve seating boxes, six on either side of the stage; they were arranged in staggered pairs and installed within arches on the side walls. The boxes were included to compensate for the relative lack of seating on the side walls, and they had unobstructed views of the stage. Each box was ornamented with a different floral motif, so the boxes were often identified by the names of the flowers on them. The boxes were removed when the New Amsterdam was converted into a movie theater. They were restored in 1997 based on historical blueprints.

===== Other design features =====
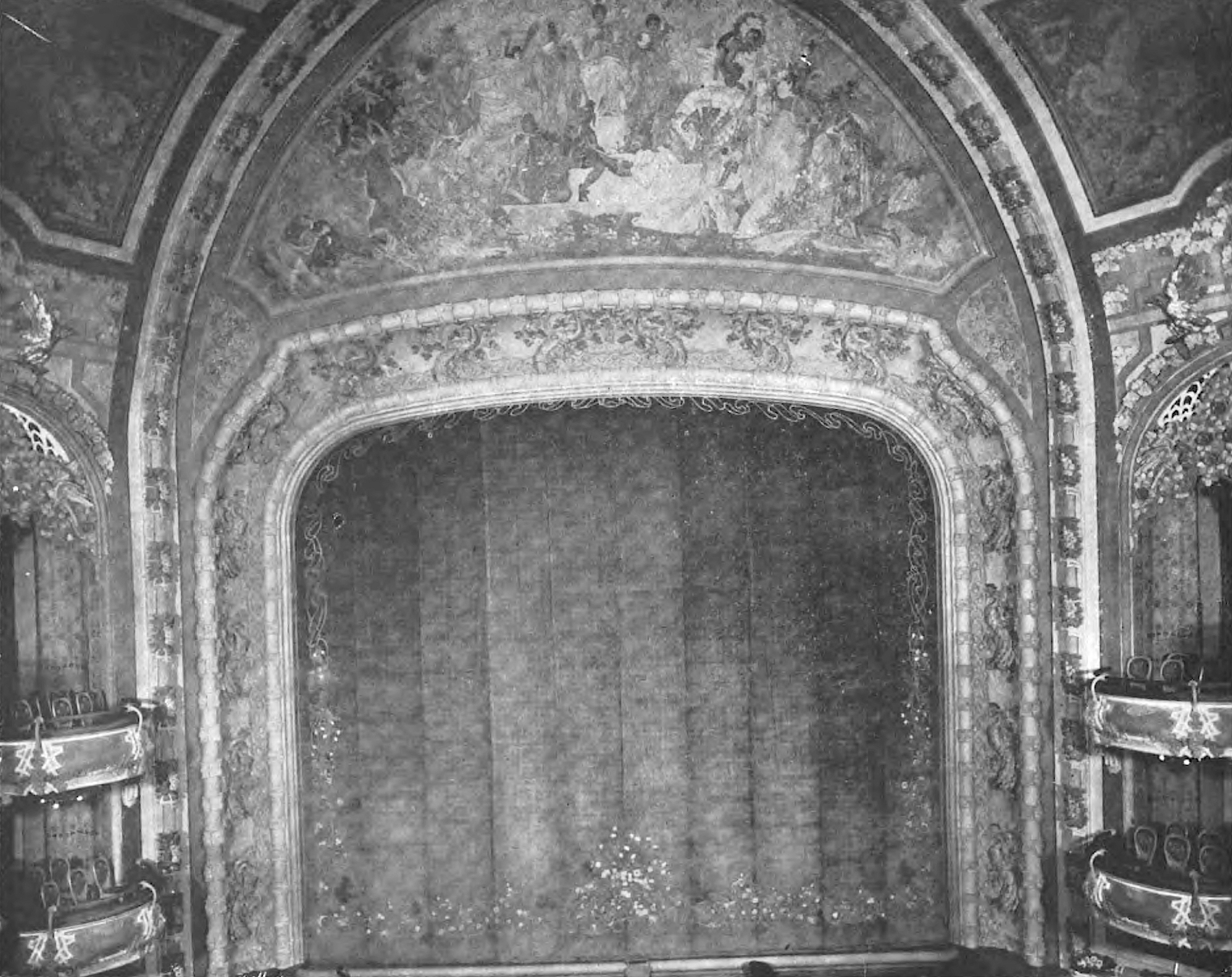
Proscenium arch of the auditorium

The Neumark brothers designed plaster and carved-oak moldings around the dome, the proscenium arch, and the wall arches. The proscenium arch measures 36 ft (11 m) high and 40 ft (12 m) wide. Surrounding the proscenium is an elliptical arch, which rises to the edge of the ceiling dome. Between the two arches is a 18-by-45-foot (5.5 by 13.7 m) mural, designed by Robert Blum and executed by Albert B. Wenzell after Blum died. The mural depicts personified figures of such topics as truth, love, melancholy, death, and chivalry, flanking a central figure representing poetry. On either side are murals by Wenzell depicting Virtue and Courage.

Issing designed 16 dark-green peacocks for the proscenium, placed atop depictions of vines. There are floral motifs and female figures around the dome. The ceiling of the auditorium has seven arches with wood paneling. The ceiling of the main auditorium contains a girder measuring 90 ft (27 m) long and 14 ft (4.3 m) tall and weighing 70 short tons (63 long tons; 64 t). At the time of the New Amsterdam's construction in 1903, this was the largest piece of steel ever used in a building.

The stage measures 60 by 100 ft (18 by 30 m), (Note: Sometimes cited as 52 by 100 ft (16 by 30 m)) making it the largest legitimate theater stage ever designed at the time. The entire stage consists of bridge spans that could be lowered to 33 ft (10 m) below the auditorium. A two-story-deep area was excavated below the stage to accommodate this. Four hydraulic platforms, each measuring 42 by 7 ft (12.8 by 2.1 m), could raise or lower different parts of the stage. The stage had a turntable, and the stage floor could be tilted. Surrounding the stage is a large freight elevator, two dressing-room elevators, and a carpentry shop. There is also a fly gallery with counterweights to raise or lower sets. One side of the stage had an electric switchboard that controlled the lighting. The original stage curtain had floral motifs similar to those in the rest of the theater. The dressing room could accommodate 500 people. The lighting system included a set of emergency exit lights, as well as reflectors to illuminate the area between the footlights.

==== Roof theater ====
The girder above the main auditorium supported a roof theater named the Aerial Gardens. Accessed by two elevators from the lobby, the Aerial Gardens was also designed by Herts & Tallant and opened in 1904. New York City building regulations at the time prohibited the construction of buildings above theater stages. As a result, the back of the theater's stage wall was directly above the proscenium arch of the main auditorium, and the stage was smaller. There was no balcony, but there were twelve boxes as well as a promenade at the rear of the roof theater. The Aerial Gardens was fully enclosed and originally had 680 seats. It could theoretically be used year-round, but in practice it was only used during the summer. There was also a planted garden adjacent to the theater. The Aerial Gardens was subsequently known as Ziegfeld Roof, Danse de Follies, Dresden Theatre, Frolics Theatre, and finally the New Amsterdam Roof.

After Florenz Ziegfeld started hosting the Ziegfeld Follies at the New Amsterdam in 1913, the main floor of the roof theater was turned into a 22,000-square-foot (2,000 m^{2}) dance floor, and a U-shaped balcony was erected. The redesigned roof theater had a movable stage and a glass balcony. Cross lighting could also be used to create rainbow color patterns. In 1930, a movable glass curtain was installed over the proscenium of the roof theater. The floor was soundproofed when the space was used as an NBC broadcast studio, and smaller studios were placed in the office wing. By the early 21st century, the roof theater had been converted into office space.

== History ==
Times Square became the epicenter for large-scale theater productions between 1900 and the Great Depression. Manhattan's theater district had begun to shift from Union Square and Madison Square during the first decade of the 20th century. The New Amsterdam, Lyceum, and Hudson, which all opened in 1903, were among the first theaters to make this shift; the New Amsterdam is one of the oldest surviving Broadway theaters. Furthermore, at the beginning of the 20th century, Klaw and Erlanger operated the predominant theatrical booking agency in the United States. They decided to relocate to 42nd Street after observing that the Metropolitan Opera House, the Victoria Theatre, and the Theatre Republic (now New Victory Theater) had been developed around that area.

=== Construction ===
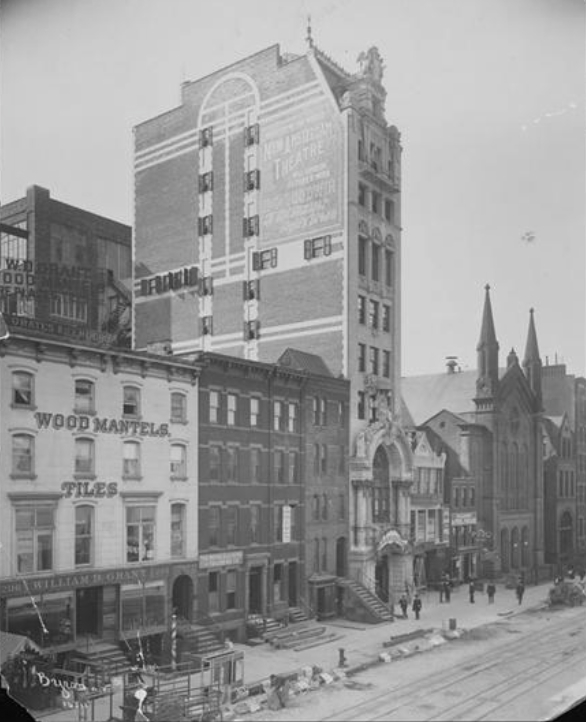
Under construction in 1903

In January 1902, Klaw and Erlanger bought seven land lots at 214 West 42nd Street and 207–219 West 41st Street. At the time, the theater was to be known as the Majestic. The next month, Fuller Construction was hired as the main contractor, and Herts & Tallant were selected as the architects for the theater. By then, the venue had been named the New Amsterdam, after the Dutch colonial settlement that predated New York City. Herts & Tallant submitted plans to the New York City Department of Buildings (DOB) shortly afterward. Construction had commenced by May 1902. Eighteen steam drills and 150 workers excavated the foundation to a depth of 40 ft (12 m).

A controversy arose in early 1903 when a neighboring landowner, Samuel McMillan, discovered that the office wing on 42nd Street would protrude 4 ft (1.2 m) beyond the lot line. The DOB ordered that work be halted temporarily, pending a decision on an ordinance regarding "ornamental projections". The New York City Board of Aldermen had already passed the ordinance, and mayor Seth Low had to decide whether to approve it. The DOB stationed a police officer outside the construction site during the daytime, but the developers erected the facade overnight in March 1903.

A meeting on the ordinance drew much public opposition, prompting Low to send the bill back to the Board of Aldermen. A judge placed an injunction in April 1903, preventing Low from making a decision on the ordinance. The injunction was vacated two days afterward, and Low vetoed the resolution. The Board of Aldermen passed a revised resolution the next week; the aldermen explicitly stated that the ordinance would help Klaw and Erlanger.

After the ordinance was passed, the New Amsterdam's facade was completed as planned. By July 1903, work was proceeding on the New Amsterdam full-time, which The New York Times attributed to an agreement between the Fuller Company and the building trades. At the beginning of that August, the steel structure was topped out. The dispute over the facade continued even after the theater's opening. In 1905, McMillan brought the lawsuit to the New York Supreme Court, Appellate Division, which ruled that the Board of Aldermen's ordinance violated the Constitution of New York.

=== Original Broadway run ===
==== 1900s and early 1910s ====
The New Amsterdam Theatre opened on October 26, 1903, with Shakespeare's A Midsummer Night's Dream, which was a failure despite costing five times as much as the typical Broadway show. In its first few months of operation, the theater also hosted Whoop Dee Doo, a musical by Weber and Fields. The new theater was chronicled in various publications. Architects' and Builders' Magazine wrote that "the character of the decoration fixes more or less the purpose of the house", and another critic wrote that "the New Amsterdam Theatre will mark an epoch in the history of art" if it were successful. The New York Times referred to the theater as "a vision of gorgeousness"; New York Plaisance magazine called it "a most beautiful and commodious place of amusement"; and yet another source said: "Architecturally it is near perfection." Theatre magazine described the New Amsterdam as "perhaps the most imposing of all the new theatres" opened on Broadway during 1903.

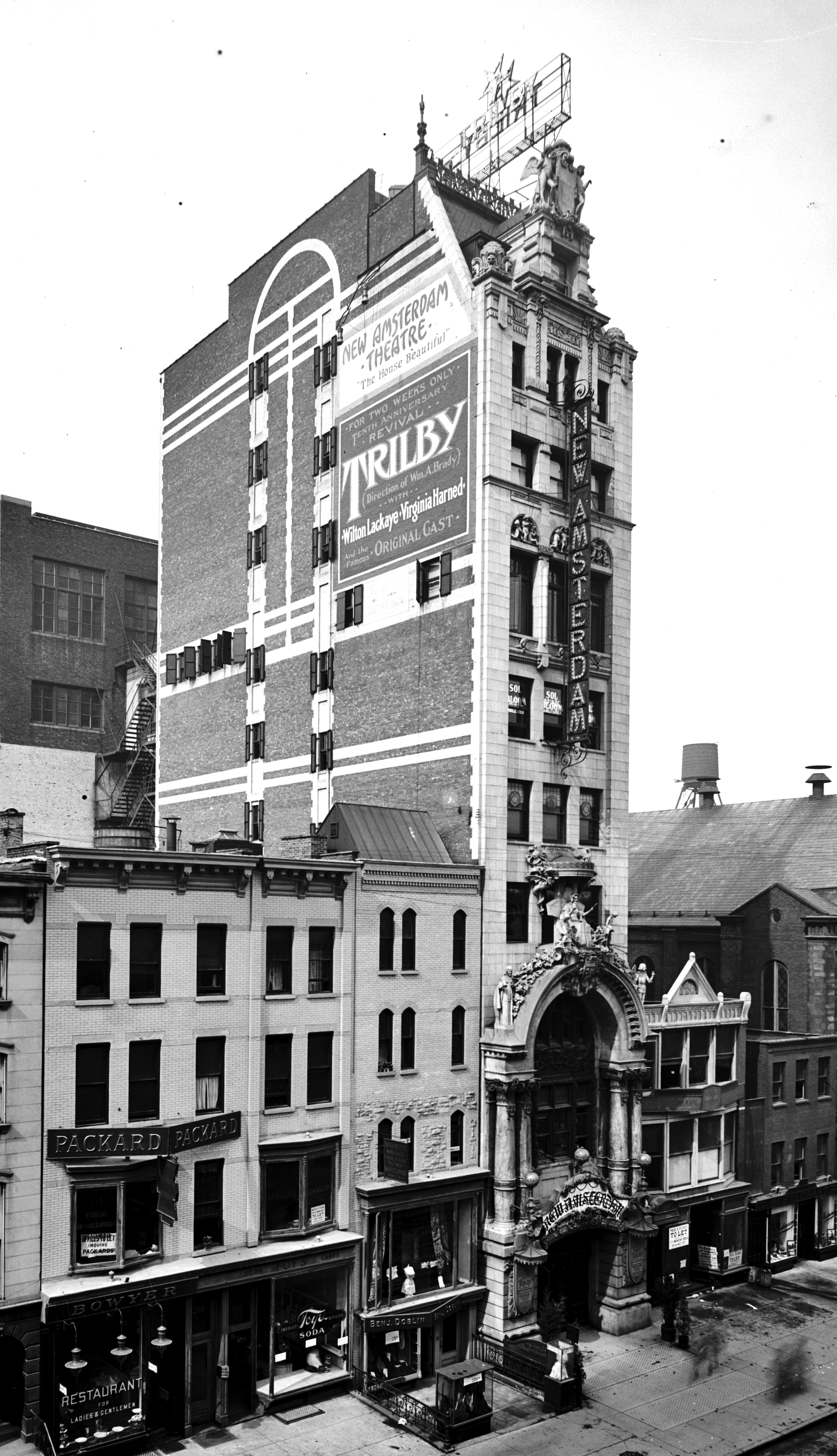
The 42nd Street facade in 1905

The Aerial Gardens opened on June 6, 1904, with the vaudeville production A Little of Everything. The New Amsterdam had started out as a venue for serious drama, but comedy drama became popular within a few years of its opening. Klaw and Erlanger had begun renting out the New Amsterdam, since they wanted to focus on other theatrical ventures, and since it was expensive for them to produce all of the theater's shows. Many producers expressed interest in the theater because of its technologically advanced equipment and Art Nouveau design. The men disagreed over the theater's bookings; Klaw wanted to stage classical productions, but Erlanger preferred large revues and musicals.

In 1905, the theater hosted the comedy She Stoops to Conquer. The next year, the theater hosted Forty-five Minutes from Broadway, featuring Fay Templeton and Victor Moore, as well as The Governor's Son, starring the family of George M. Cohan. This was followed in 1907 by The Merry Widow, which ran 416 performances at both the main auditorium and the Aerial Gardens. Richard Mansfield appeared in a limited number of performances at the theater for several seasons, starring in both Richard III and Peer Gynt. Kitty Grey, starring Julia Sanderson, was staged at the New Amsterdam in 1909, as was the European operetta The Silver Star.

The New Amsterdam also staged musicals, particularly those imported from Europe, as well as classic hits. The productions included those by Shakespeare, as well as "kiddie fare" such as Mother Goose and Humpty Dumpty. In 1910, the New Amsterdam staged the melodrama Madame X and the European operetta Madame Sherry, the latter of which ran 231 performances. The next year saw a production of The Pink Lady with Hazel Dawn, running 312 performances, as well as the musical adaptation of Ben-Hur. The New Amsterdam hosted several other productions in 1912 and 1913, including Robin Hood, The Count of Luxembourg, and Oh! Oh! Delphine.

==== Ziegfeld Follies era ====
Flo Ziegfeld hosted the Ziegfeld Follies, a series of revues, at the New Amsterdam every year from 1913 to 1927, with two exceptions. (Note: In 1921, the Follies was hosted at the Globe Theatre because the New Amsterdam was hosting Sally. The 1926 Follies were skipped.) Ziegfeld's relationship with Klaw and Erlanger had dated to the mid-1900s, when the syndicate had paid him $200 a week to present vaudeville; by 1907, he had come up with the Follies. The first edition of the Follies at the New Amsterdam was hosted on June 16, 1913. Among the performers in the Follies were Fanny Brice, Eddie Cantor, W. C. Fields, Ina Claire, Marilyn Miller, Will Rogers, Sophie Tucker, Bert Williams, and Van and Schenck. An urban legend holds that the theater contains the ghost of one performer, silent film star Olive Thomas.

Ziegfeld hired either Joseph Urban or John Eberson to redesign the theater on the roof with a balcony and a dance floor. With the completion of the roof theater's renovation, Ziegfeld began displaying Danse de Follies, a racier sister show of the Follies, in 1915. Subsequently, known as the Midnight Frolic, the show was also used to test the skills of promising up-and-coming performers. Ziegfeld also had his own office on the seventh floor of the office wing. The 1924 edition of the Follies had the longest run, with 401 performances, though that edition was not particularly distinctive either critically or artistically.

Between each year's edition of the Follies, the theater hosted other productions. The production Sweethearts premiered in 1913, and Hazel Dawn starred in The Little Cafe the same year. The musical Watch Your Step premiered at the New Amsterdam in 1914, featuring Irving Berlin's first complete Broadway score; it ran for 175 performances. A performance of Around the Map was staged in 1915. The following year, Sir Herbert Tree and Company staged several Shakespeare plays, and Guy Bolton and Emmerich Kálmán's musical Miss Springtime ran 224 performances. The Cohan Revue of 1918 was then staged at the New Amsterdam, followed the same year by The Rainbow Girl and The Girl Behind the Gun. The decade ended with The Velvet Lady, as well as a musical version of Monsieur Beaucaire, in 1919.

The New Amsterdam staged Sally, where Marilyn Miller had her musical comedy debut, in 1920; it ran for 570 performances. The Midnight Frolic was popular but, because it offered alcoholic beverages, closed during Prohibition in 1921 or 1922. It then reopened as the Dresden, with performances of Cinders starting in April 1923. The rooftop theater became the Frolic Theatre in September 1923 and was operated by Ziegfeld and Charles Dillingham. During the mid- and late 1920s, the main auditorium hosted several plays. In 1925, the musical Sunny opened, ultimately running 517 performances; by contrast, Betsy opened the next year and was a failure with 39 performances. The main auditorium's productions in 1927 included Lucky, Trelawny of the 'Wells', and Julius Caesar. The Frolic, meanwhile, hosted a performance of He Loved the Ladies during one week in 1927; one of the seven showings had no audience members at all.

==== Late 1920s and 1930s ====
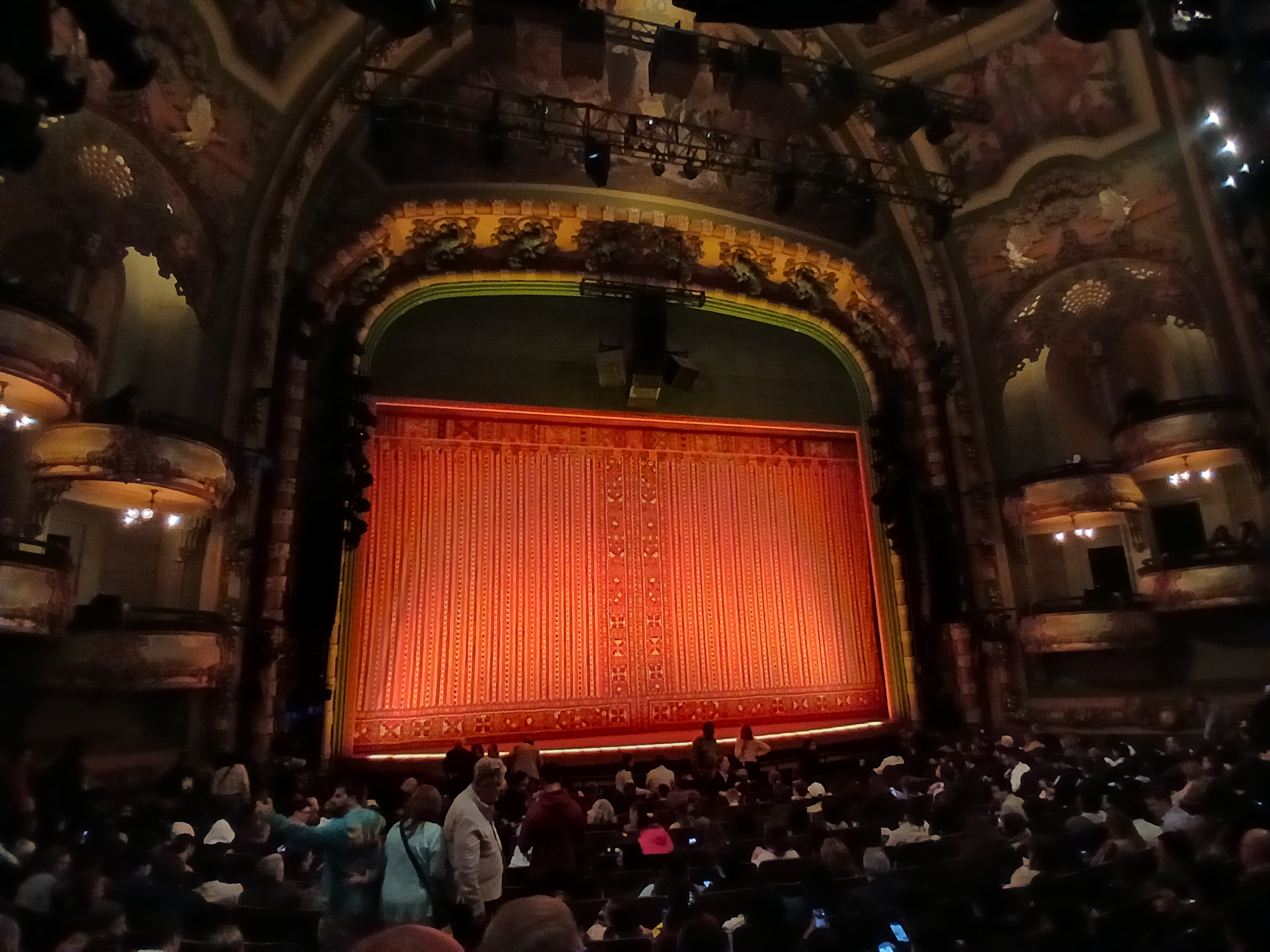
View of the proscenium arch and boxes from the orchestra level

Klaw and Erlanger continued to operate the New Amsterdam Theatre jointly until 1927, when Erlanger bought out Klaw's interest. Erlanger then announced plans to renovate the New Amsterdam Theatre for $500,000. The same year, Ziegfeld developed his own theater, the Ziegfeld Theatre on Sixth Avenue. The theater's hits in 1928 included the musical comedy Rosalie, which ran 327 performances, and Whoopee, which ran 379 performances. Meanwhile, Ziegfeld re-launched the Midnight Frolic at the rooftop theater in December 1928. Erlanger announced in June 1929 that he would convert the rooftop theater into a modern facility called Aerial Theater, which would accommodate legitimate plays, films with sound, or radio broadcasts. Upon obtaining sole ownership of the theater, Erlanger renewed Dillingham and Ziegfeld's lease, which had been set to expire at the end of 1929. Another production was staged at the main auditorium in 1929, Sherlock Holmes.

Erlanger was in significant debt when he died in 1930, and the Dry Dock Savings Bank took over his estate. In the 1930s, during the beginning of the Great Depression, many Broadway theaters were impacted by declining attendance. The main auditorium only saw a small decrease in quality and quantity of productions, but the Frolics Theatre had a steep decline in premieres. NBC took over the roof theater in February 1930 and converted it into a broadcast studio, the NBC Times Square Studio, which opened the next month. The modifications cost $70,000. Downstairs, Earl Carroll's Vanities of 1930 was played at the main auditorium. A revival of The Admirable Crichton and the original revue The Band Wagon followed in 1931, as did Face the Music in 1932.

After Face the Music closed at the end of 1932, the theater had no musical premiere for the first time in its history. During early 1933, the musicals Alice in Wonderland and The Cherry Orchard had limited runs at the New Amsterdam, presented by Eva Le Gallienne and her Civic Repertory Theater. Murder at the Vanities premiered in late 1933 and was followed by Roberta the same year, the latter of which was a hit with 295 performances. When Revenge with Music premiered at the New Amsterdam in 1934, it was the only remaining legitimate theater production on 42nd Street. Revenge with Music was followed by George White's Scandals of 1936, as well as Sigmund Romberg's Forbidden Melody the same year.

The Dry Dock Savings Bank acquired the New Amsterdam Theatre through a foreclosure proceeding in May 1936 after the theater's owners had failed to pay over $1.65 million in interest, taxes, and other fees. By then, Erlanger and Ziegfeld had died several years previously. Afterward, Dry Dock leased the roof to CBS and the Mutual Broadcasting System for broadcasts, but an injunction was placed in August 1936 because Dry Dock had no broadcast license. The broadcasters had to apply for a license after Dry Dock unsuccessfully sued to have the injunction removed. Othello, which premiered in January 1937, was the last live performance at the New Amsterdam for more than half a century; it ran for 21 performances before closing.

=== Movie theater and decline ===
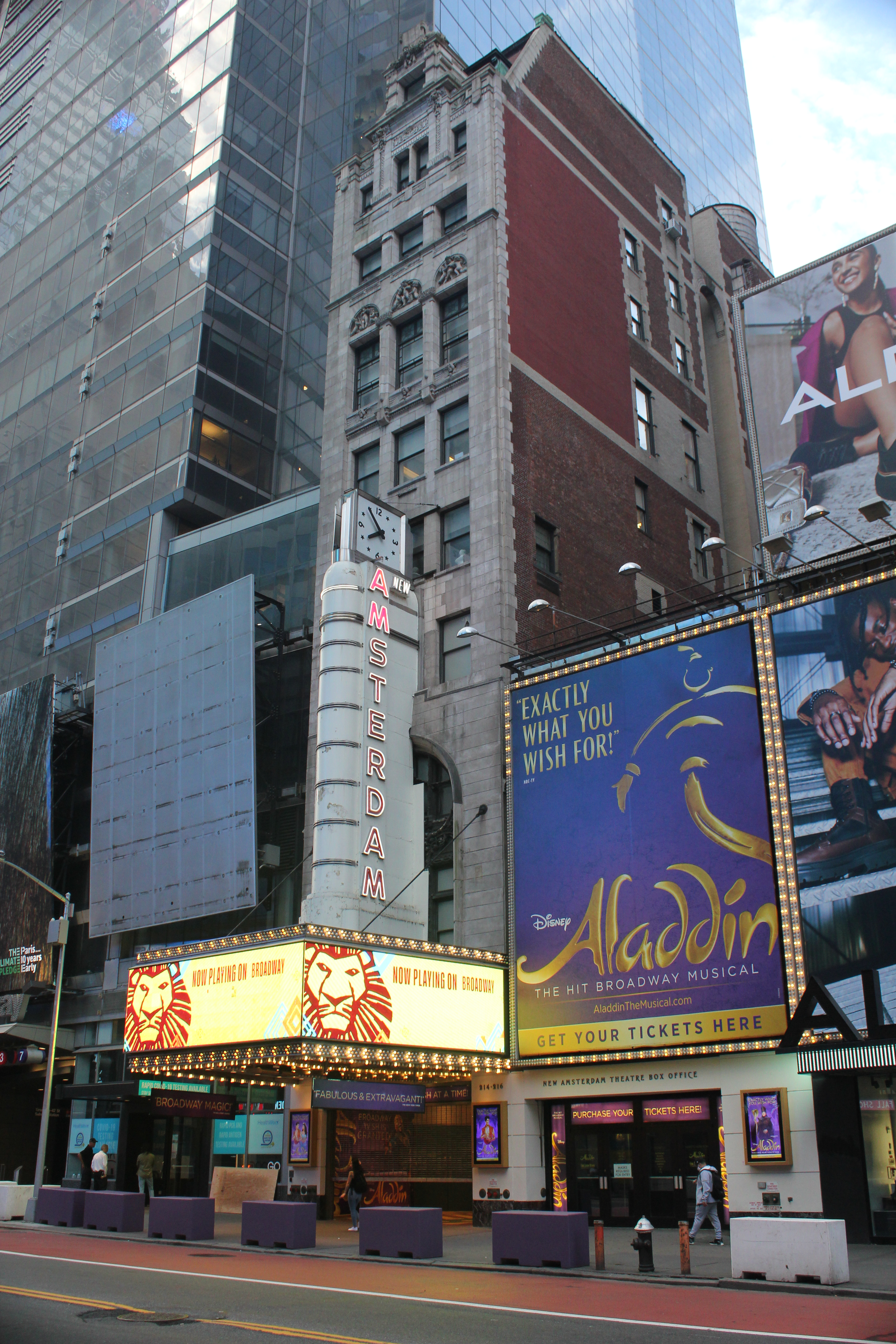
The 42nd Street facade, pictured in 2021, was substantially altered in 1937.

The New Amsterdam Theatre was sold in June 1937 to Max A. Cohen of Anco Enterprises, (Note: Contemporary New York Times and New York Herald Tribune articles report that the theater was sold for $1.05 million; Henderson & Greene 2008, p. 103, states that the theater was sold for $1.5 million.) under the condition that the New Amsterdam never host burlesque. Cohen renovated the facade, replacing the original decorations with a marquee. The New Amsterdam reopened as a movie theater on July 3, 1937, showing the film adaptation of A Midsummer Night's Dream. Bernard Sobel, Flo Ziegfeld's former agent, lamented in The New York Times that the cinema conversion was "another indication that the old order has indeed changed". The theater showed other movies for 10 to 25 cents per ticket, although Cohen could not show first runs of movies immediately upon their release, at least not initially. The marquee was further modified in 1947. The auditorium boxes were removed as part of a 1953 renovation. These modifications allowed the installation of a Cinerama wide screen.

MBS continued to use the rooftop theater as a studio. The Cinema Circuit Corporation leased the roof theater in April 1943, showing movies at the 740-seat facility only on weekends. That November, the roof theater hosted a ten-week roster of small plays. The United Booking Office, the New Amsterdam's last remaining tenant from the legitimate theater era, moved out of the office wing that year. The roof studio was leased in 1949 to television station WOR-TV, which spent $75,000 to remodel the roof theater and $20,000 on equipment. The renovated rooftop studio started broadcasting in October 1949.

In subsequent years, the roof theater was used for rehearsals, and the main auditorium became a profitable cinema. By the late 1950s, the New Amsterdam was one of two theaters on the block that showed first-run films, the other being the Lyric. Ticket prices were higher than both "move-over houses", which received films immediately after they ran at the first-run theaters, and the "reissue houses", which screened old films. The New Amsterdam and the other 42nd Street theaters operated from 8 a.m. to 3 a.m., with three shifts of workers. The ten theaters on the block attracted about five million visitors a year between them.

In 1960, Mark Finkelstein, who co-owned the theater building with Cohen, announced that the roof theater would be renovated into a 700-seat venue for theatrical productions. The following year, Finkelstein and Andour Enterprises Inc. were listed as having purchased the building outright. Cohen retired around the same time, and Finkelstein took over full operation. By the early 1960s, the surrounding block had decayed, but many of the old theater buildings from the block's heyday remained, including the New Amsterdam. Later in the 1960s, a critic characterized the roof theater as a "gloomy cavern" and the main auditorium as "just another in the dubious string of 42nd Street movie houses". By the late 1970s, the New Amsterdam Theatre was dilapidated, though many of the interior decorations still remained. The area had become dangerous: two armed guards were killed at the theater during a robbery in 1976, and a patron was stabbed to death in 1979. The cinema continued to run until about 1982 or 1983, showing kung fu movies in its final years.

=== Restoration ===
The 42nd Street Development Corporation, formed in 1976 to discuss plans for redeveloping Times Square, considered turning the New Amsterdam Theatre into a dance complex in 1977. The same year, the City University of New York's Graduate Center hosted an exhibition with photographs of the New Amsterdam and other theaters to advocate for the area's restoration. Another plan, in 1978, called for restoring the New Amsterdam as a legitimate theater while razing nearby buildings to create a park. The New York City Landmarks Preservation Commission designated the New Amsterdam Theatre and a portion of its interior as a city landmark on October 23, 1979. The theater was added to the National Register of Historic Places on January 10, 1980.

==== Nederlander plans ====
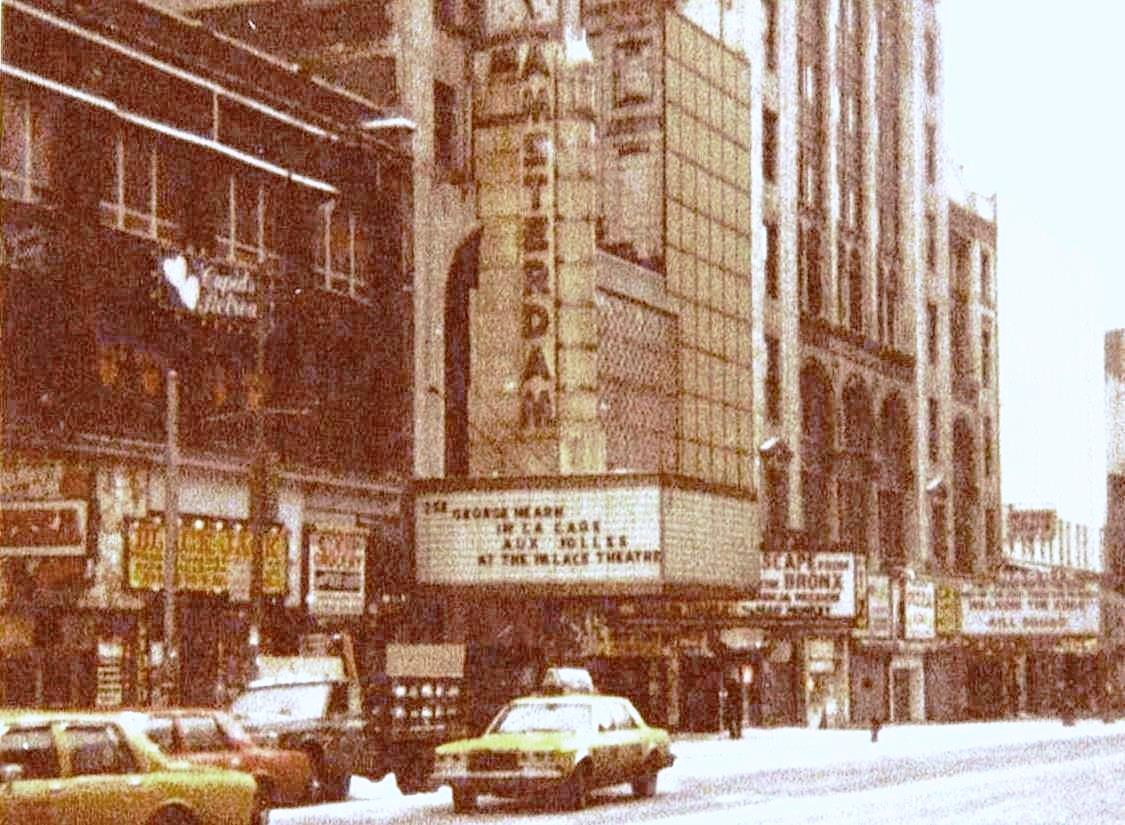
The theater and surrounding buildings in 1985

The New York State Urban Development Corporation (UDC), an agency of the New York state government, had proposed redeveloping the area around a portion of West 42nd Street in 1981. Theatrical operator Nederlander Organization tried to buy the New Amsterdam Theatre from Finkelstein in early 1982, before the city and state governments selected developers for the sites, but was unsuccessful. The city government selected the Nederlander Organization in April 1982 to operate the New Amsterdam Theatre, and the Nederlanders bought the rights to operate the theater in December 1982. The theater was technically owned by the New York City Industrial Development Corporation, which issued $5 million in bonds to finance the acquisition. The Nederlanders were responsible for developing the theater, paying off the bonds, and making $250,000 in annual payments in lieu of taxes. The company planned to redevelop the main auditorium into a 1,700-seat theater and reopen the 700-seat roof theater by 1983. If the rest of the 42nd Street Development Project was unsuccessful, the Nederlanders could switch the theater's main entrance to 41st Street.

Plans for restoration were officially announced in May 1983. The $6 million project would use both private and public funding. Robert Nederlander of the Nederlander Organization had wanted to continue hosting motion pictures while the redevelopment was underway, but the city government denied his proposal. Soon after work began, contractors discovered more structural damage than they had expected, including rotting girders. This led the Nederlanders to announce in mid-1983 that the reopening would be delayed indefinitely. The production of the musical Carmen, which was supposed to be presented at the roof theater, was relocated as a result. The Nederlanders wanted to seal off the roof theater completely, but the city government suggested instead that the National Theater Center be hosted on the roof. City officials indicated that they would provide $2.5 million to restore the roof theater and convert it to the National Theater Center, but the city allocated the funds elsewhere in the 1985 city budget.

The Empire State Development Corporation and New York City Economic Development Corporation purchased the property in 1984. The same year, Jerry Weintraub purchased a stake in the operation of the New Amsterdam. The theater's renovation had been planned in conjunction with four new office towers, the development of which had been delayed. The renovation was abandoned partway through, the decorations being left exposed to the elements. The roof had started leaking, and the interior had water damage. Several shows were announced for the rundown theater, all of which were withdrawn. After having spent $15 million on renovations, the Nederlanders announced in 1990 that the New Amsterdam's restoration would not be viable "for the next several years" until the four office towers were completed. The New York City Opera considered moving to the theater in 1991 but decided against doing so.

After the Nederlanders fell behind on their payments in 1992, the UDC agreed to take over the theater for $247,000 or $275,000. Hardy Holzman Pfeiffer Associates (HHPA) was hired to stabilize the structure. By then, chunks of plaster had fallen from the roof and mezzanine, and entire sections of the roof theater had fallen apart. Bird droppings had appeared all over the floor because there were holes in the roof. There were dead cats in the basement, and mushrooms were growing through the auditorium floor. A reporter for the Los Angeles Times wrote in 1994 that the theater's "cracking terra-cotta ornaments, faded murals and decayed plaster moldings [form] a depressing metaphor for the decline of Times Square".

==== Disney expression of interest ====
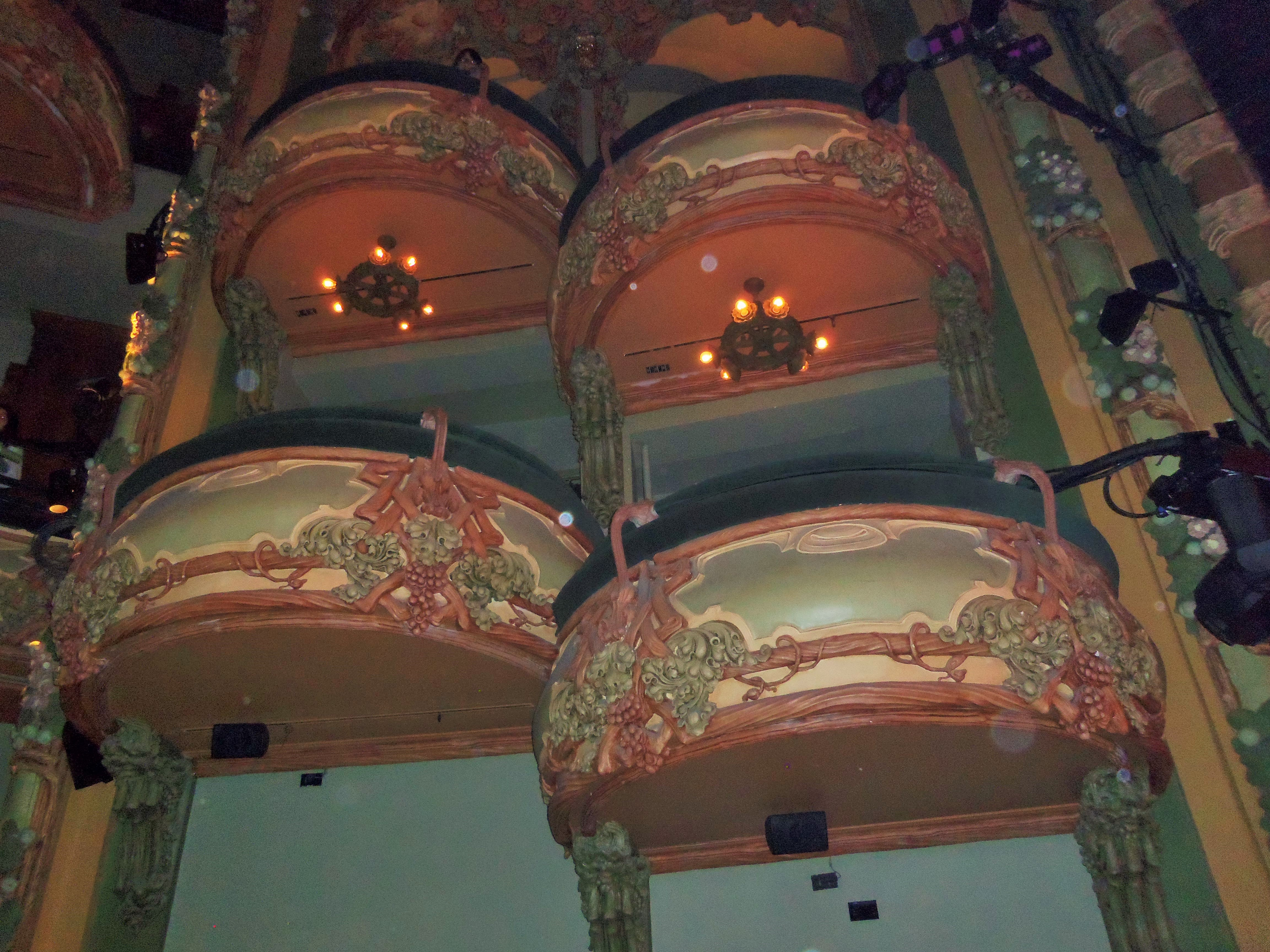
Restored boxes in the auditorium

Marian Sulzberger Heiskell, a chairwoman of the 42nd Street Development Project, was a family friend of Michael Eisner, the chairman of The Walt Disney Company. For several years in the 1980s and 1990s, Heiskell had tried to convince Eisner to open a Disney enterprise on Times Square. Disney's internal studies showed that such a venue would conflict with the gated and clean image of its amusement parks and other venues. Architect Robert A. M. Stern, who had worked both on Disney projects and on the 42nd Street Development, tried to convince Eisner but was rebuffed. In March 1993, Eisner changed his mind and asked to see a full-size model of the buildings being planned in the 42nd Street Development. At a meeting to discuss designs for the town of Celebration, Florida, Stern arranged for Eisner to tour the theater. Eisner quickly agreed to renovate the theater after New 42nd Street president Cora Cahan guided him through the dilapidated interior.

In September 1993, the media reported that Disney was seriously considering renovating the New Amsterdam Theatre. Disney had planned to show Beauty and the Beast there, but delays forced the production to open at the Palace Theatre instead. Disney had tentatively agreed to take over the New Amsterdam by the end of the year, and mayor Rudy Giuliani and governor Mario Cuomo publicly announced plans for the theater's restoration in January 1994. Disney real estate negotiator Frank S. Ioppolo Sr. obtained several guarantees after threatening to withdraw from the project. This included protection against lawsuits over the proposed renovation; expensive, high-quality items; and government subsidies from the state and city. Other Broadway theater operators had initially opposed the economic incentives, alleging the 42nd Street Development Project was tantamount to a subsidy for the New Amsterdam. After Cuomo promised to create a loan program for other Broadway theaters, two operators dropped their opposition to Disney's project.

==== Disney renovation ====
Disney announced plans in February 1994 to renovate the theater with $8 million of its own equity and a $21 million low-interest loan from the city and state governments. Other entertainment companies showed interest in the 42nd Street redevelopment after the agreement was announced, and there was also interest in renovating 42nd Street's other theaters. During 1994, the rundown theater was used as a filming location for the movie Vanya on 42nd Street. Officials agreed to loan Disney another $5 million later that year.

In May 1995, Disney Theatrical Productions signed a 49-year revenue-based lease for the property in May 1995, in which Disney would pay the city and state a percentage of the gross sales from the theater. Disney, along with the city and state governments, ultimately agreed to share any costs above $32.5 million. Disney would also pay about $2 million for higher-quality materials, and the city and state governments would commit $1.9 million to a contingency fund. The financial plan was finalized in July 1995. Disney wanted at least two other companies to commit to new developments in Times Square before it agreed to restore the New Amsterdam. After the recent high-profile cancellations of the Disney's America and WestCOT theme parks, Disney Development vice president David A. Malmuth wanted a successful development. Madame Tussauds and AMC Theatres subsequently agreed to redevelop three neighboring theaters.

Disney's research and development subsidiary, Walt Disney Imagineering, oversaw the renovation of the New Amsterdam Theatre, hiring design firm Theatre Projects Consultants as a consultant. HHPA was hired to design the renovation, and Tishman Construction was the general contractor. Some mockups of the decorations were created before work commenced. Conservators took a paint chip sample from a billboard outside the building and discovered 121 layers of paint, each for a different event. According to Hugh Hardy of HHPA, the project entailed recreating half the oak paneling and three-quarters of the plaster decoration, as well as the restoration of other decorations and the installation of new mechanical systems. Some of the decorative details were painted and glazed to appear older than they actually were. New spaces, such as lounges, restrooms, and elevators, were also created. At some point in the restoration, state preservation officials had requested the restoration of the ornament on the 42nd Street facade. This request was ultimately dropped after officials determined that the replacement marquee was itself an important part of the theater's history.

=== Disney operation ===
The New Amsterdam's restoration was officially completed on April 2, 1997. Architectural critic Ada Louise Huxtable wrote "If this is Disney magic, we need more of it", and Herbert Muschamp wrote: "The place is an architectural version of an American Eden, the unsullied natural paradise in which European explorers cast the New World." The first production was a limited engagement of a concert version of King David that May, followed by the premiere of the film Hercules the following month. Disney's decision to stage these events was to ensure the New Amsterdam's restoration would not be overshadowed by the premiere of The Lion King, which in itself was a highly acclaimed production. The Lion King opened in November 1997. The roof theater remained closed, and Disney had no plans to reopen it, in part because the elevators could not accommodate 700 patrons under city building codes. Disney had converted the roof theater into office space by the early 21st century. The renovation of the theater was detailed in the book The New Amsterdam: The Biography of a Broadway Theater.

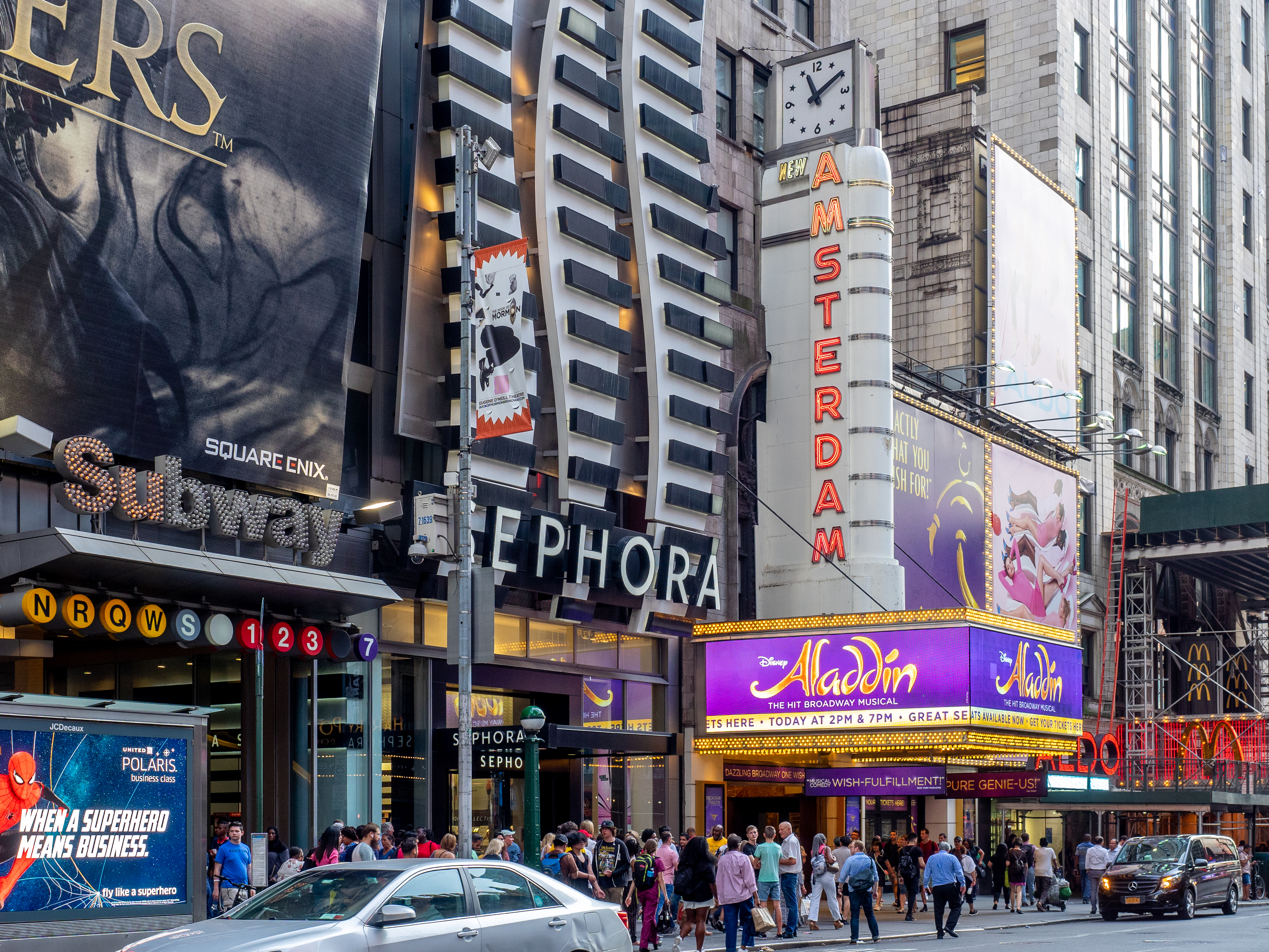
Aladdin at the New Amsterdam Theatre

Disney's restoration of the New Amsterdam Theatre helped spur the long-delayed redevelopment of Times Square; this led to criticisms of the area's "Disneyfication" from observers who were unaware of Disney's investment. Besides theatrical productions, the revived New Amsterdam has hosted events benefiting Broadway Cares/Equity Fights AIDS, including past iterations of the annual Easter Bonnet Competition. It also hosted a televised concert by the Backstreet Boys for Disney Channel, Backstreet Boys In Concert, in 1998, and a single performance of the musical Chess in 2003. The Lion King ran at the New Amsterdam until June 2006, when it relocated to the Minskoff Theatre to make way for Mary Poppins. Mary Poppins began previews at the New Amsterdam on October 14, 2006, and had its first regular performance on November 16, 2006; it ran until March 3, 2013.

Previews for the musical Aladdin began on February 26, 2014, and the show officially opened on March 20, 2014. Aladdin broke the house record at the New Amsterdam Theatre for the week ending August 10, 2014, with a gross of $1,602,785. As of 2023, Aladdin also holds the box-office record for the New Amsterdam Theatre, grossing $2,584,549 over nine performances for the week ending December 30, 2018. All Broadway theaters temporarily closed on March 12, 2020, due to the COVID-19 pandemic. The New Amsterdam reopened September 28, 2021, with performances of Aladdin, which played its 4,000th performance at the theater in May 2025.

== Notable productions ==
Productions are listed by the year of their first performance. The Ziegfeld Follies, which have had multiple editions, are listed by the years of the first performances of each edition. This list only includes Broadway shows; it does not include films screened there.

Uniquely among Broadway theaters, Playbills are not distributed at the New Amsterdam Theatre; instead, theatergoers receive a "Showbill". Showbill is produced by the same company but does not contain liquor advertising, in line with requirements of the Walt Disney Company.

Notable productions at the theater
Opening year	Name	Refs.
1903	A Midsummer Night's Dream	
1903	Whoop-Dee-Doo	
1903	Mother Goose	
1904	The Two Orphans	
1905	She Stoops to Conquer	
1905	Richard III	
1906	Forty-five Minutes from Broadway	
1907	The Merry Widow	
1907	Peer Gynt	
1909	The Silver Star	
1910	Madame X	
1911	The Pink Lady	
1911	Ben-Hur	
1912	The Count of Luxembourg	
1913	Oh! Oh! Delphine	
1913–1927	Ziegfeld Follies	(Note: Including the Ziegfeld Follies of 1919)
1913	Sweethearts	
1914	Watch Your Step	
1918	The Girl Behind the Gun	
1920	Sally	
1923	Cinders	
1925	Sunny	
1927	Trelawny of the 'Wells'	
1928	Rosalie	
1928	Whoopee	
1930	Earl Carroll's Vanities	
1931	The Band Wagon	
1932	Face the Music	
1933	Alice in Wonderland	
1933	The Cherry Orchard	
1933	Roberta	
1934	Revenge with Music	
1936	George White's Scandals	
1937	Othello	
1997	King David	
1997	The Lion King	
2003	Chess	
2006	Mary Poppins	
2014	Aladdin	

== See also ==
- List of Broadway theaters
- List of New York City Designated Landmarks in Manhattan from 14th to 59th Streets
- National Register of Historic Places listings in Manhattan from 14th to 59th Streets
