= Hugh Hardy =

American architect

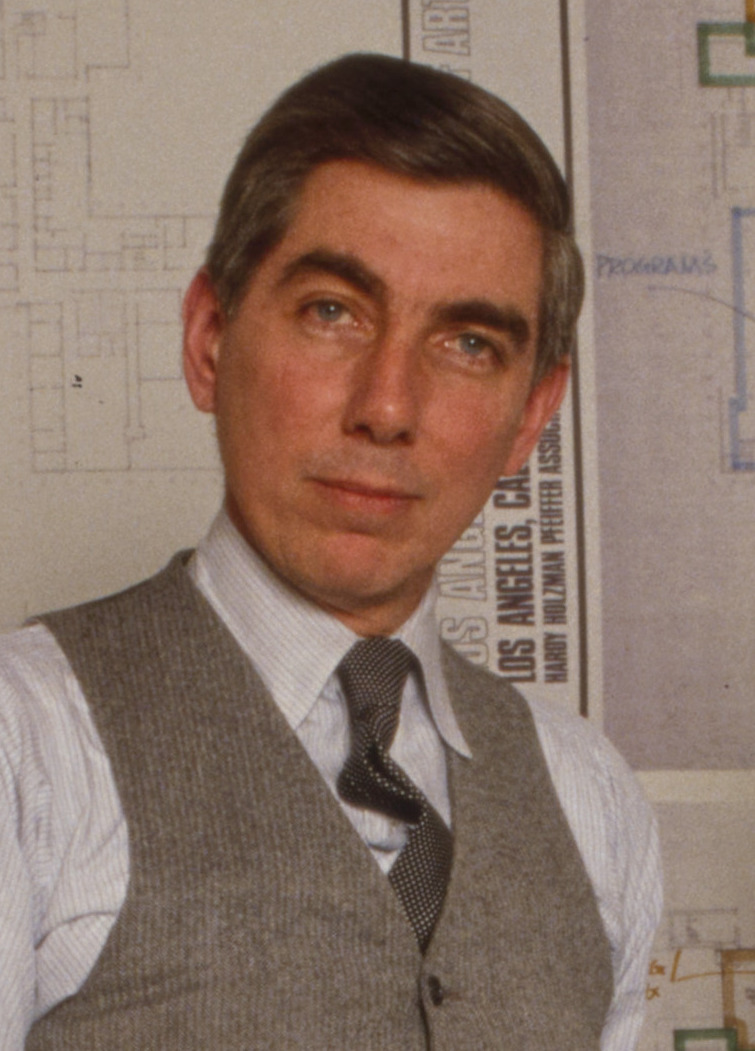
- Hardy in his New York office in 1981
- Born: July 26, 1932; Majorca, Spain
- Died: March 17, 2017 (aged 84); New York City, U.S.
- Education: Princeton University
- Occupation: Architect
- Spouse: Tiziana Hardy
- Children: Two

Hugh Hardy (July 26, 1932 – March 17, 2017) was an American architect, known for designing and revitalizing theaters, performing arts venues, public spaces, and cultural facilities across the United States.

The New Yorker writer Brendan Gill called him "the Stanford White of our fin de siècle". In 1995, Julie Iovine of The New York Times wrote, "There is scarcely a cultural icon in the city with which Mr. Hardy has not been involved."

== Biography ==
Hugh Gelston Hardy was born on July 26, 1932, in Majorca, Spain, to Gelston Hardy and the former Barbara Bonestell Walton. His father, who worked for Young & Rubicam advertising agency, had traveled to Spain to write a novel. The family soon returned to New York, dividing their time between Manhattan and Irvington-on-Hudson.

Hardy graduated from the Deerfield Academy in 1950. He then attended his father's alma mater, Princeton University, where he studied under Jean Labatut and earned a Bachelor of Architecture in 1954 and a Master of Fine Arts in Architecture in 1956. As a student at Princeton, he designed sets for productions by Princeton's Theatre Intime and Triangle Club at the McCarter Theater. After serving as a drafting instructor in the United States Army Corps of Engineers, he began working with the theatrical set and lighting designer Jo Mielziner in New York. One of his first projects was the Vivian Beaumont Theater, designed by Eero Saarinen; he painted a hotel-room set for the original stage production of the musical Gypsy. Hardy joined Local 829 of the United Scenic Artists in 1958.

Over the course of his career, Hardy founded three firms: Hugh Hardy & Associates in 1962, Hardy Holzman Pfeiffer Associates in 1967, and H3 Hardy Collaboration Architecture in 2004. Hardy Holzman Pfeiffer received the Architecture Firm Award in 1981, the highest honor bestowed on a firm by American Institute of Architects for distinguished work. Hardy was also a Fellow of the American Institute of Architects.

He was named a member of the American Academy of Arts and Letters in 1993. He won the Placemark Award from the Design History Foundation (2001), the AIA New York Chapter's President's Award (2002), the General Services Administration Commissioner's Award for Excellence in Public Architecture, the Architectural League of New York's President's Medal (2010), and the Historic Districts Council's Landmarks Lion award (2013). In 1981, he was elected into the National Academy of Design as an associate member; he became a full academician in 1994. In 2010, Hardy was one of 52 leading architects invited to participate in Vanity Fair's 2010 World Architecture Survey.

One of Hardy's specialities was the design and renovation of theaters. In New York City, Hardy had a hand in the renovation and revitalization of many of the New York's most iconic historic performance spaces, including Radio City Music Hall, the Brooklyn Academy of Music (formerly the Majestic Theater), and Broadway's New Amsterdam Theater and New Victory Theater. Decades after Hardy had designed sets for student productions at Princeton's McCarter Theater, he returned to design the Berlind Theater addition (completed in 2003). On March 22, 2017, theaters in New York City and across the United States dimmed the lights of their marquees in memory of Hardy.

=== Personal life ===
Hardy married the architect Tiziana Spadea in 1965. They had two children.

On March 16, 2017, Hardy fell and hit his head while getting out of a taxi in Manhattan. Later that evening, he attended a performance at the Joyce Theater, a building he had undertaken renovations on. He lost consciousness there, and was hospitalized at Mount Sinai Beth Israel, where he died from a cerebral hemorrhage the following day, at the age of 84.

=== Work ===
Select examples of his firm's work include:

- Radio City Music Hall renovation, Manhattan, New York
- Brooklyn Academy of Music, Brooklyn, New York
- Rizzoli Bookstore, Manhattan, New York
- Theatre for a New Audience, Brooklyn, New York
- LCT3 / Claire Tow Theater, Lincoln Center Theater, Manhattan, New York
- New Amsterdam Theatre, Manhattan, New York
- New Victory Theater, Manhattan, New York
- Theater Row, Manhattan, New York
- Bridgemarket (an area of the Queensboro Bridge), Manhattan, New York
- Bryant Park kiosks, café and grill, Manhattan, New York
- Herald and Greeley Square Park kiosks, Manhattan, New York
- Whitaker Center for Science and the Arts, Harrisburg, Pennsylvania
- Joyce Theater, Manhattan, New York
- Rainbow Room renovation, Manhattan, New York
- 18 West 11th Street, Manhattan, New York
- Windows on the World renovation, Manhattan, New York (destroyed September 11, 2001)
- Alice Busch Opera Theater, Glimmerglass Festival, Cooperstown, New York
- Casa 74, also known as 255 East 74th Street, Upper East Side, Manhattan, New York (with SLCE Architects)
- Native Plant Garden pavilions (2013), Leon Levy Visitor Center (2004), Arthur and Janet Ross Lecture Hall revitalization (1993); The New York Botanical Garden, Bronx, New York

== See also ==
- List of American architects
- List of Deerfield alumni
- Malcolm Holzman
- List of people from New York City
- List of Princeton University people
