= Nestor Bottino =

Argentine-American architect (born 1955)

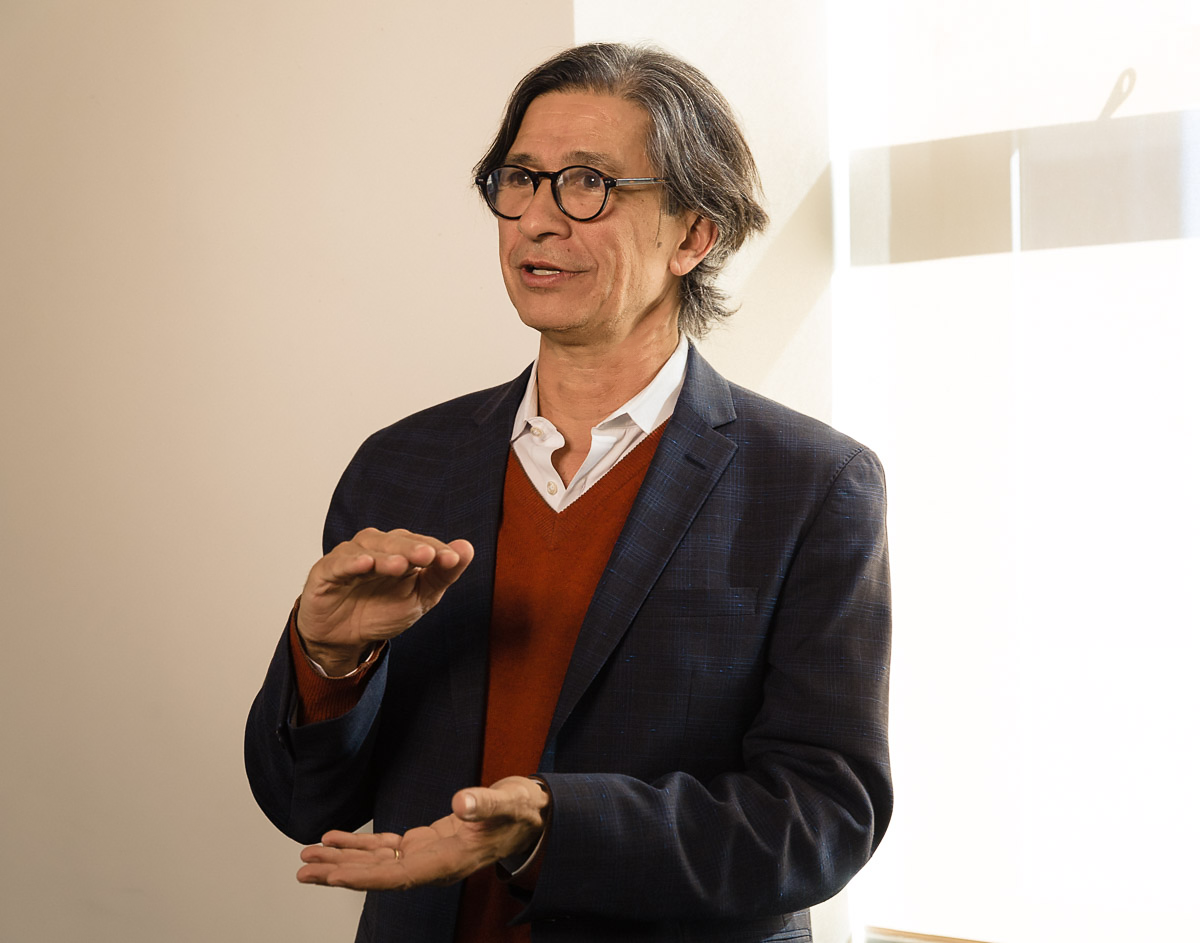
- Born: December 24, 1955 (age 70); La Plata, Argentina
- Education: University of Texas Austin, Texas A&M University
- Occupation: Architect
- Practice: Steinberg Hart
- Website: steinberghart.com

Nestor Bottino, FAIA (born 1955) is an Argentine-American architect and partner at Steinberg Hart. Born in Argentina and educated in Texas, Bottino is based in New York City.

== Life and career ==
Bottino was born in La Plata, Argentina in 1955. In 1964 he and his family moved to Texas. In 1977 Bottino received a Bachelor of Environmental Design degree from Texas A&M University. In 1976 he served an internship in the office of architect Bruce Goff. He received a Masters of Architecture degree from the University of Texas at Austin in 1984 and joined the office of Michael Benedikt Architect (1984-1986). In 1985 he worked at Architekturbüro Szyszkowitz + Kowalski in Graz, Austria. He joined the New York City office of Hardy Holzman Pfeiffer Associates in 1986 and was named Principal in 2000. In 2004 Bottino founded Bottino Grund Architects with offices in New York City and Austin, Texas.

Bottino joined Holzman Moss Architecture in 2008 and the firm name was changed to Holzman Moss Bottino Architecture in 2010.

In October 2019 Holzman Moss Bottino Architecture merged with California-based Steinberg Hart, and Bottino became a partner at Steinberg Hart.

Bottino has held a number of adjunct academic appointments, including teaching design studios focused on performing arts facilities at the University of Texas at Austin (2004 and 1998), Texas A&M University (1998), and with Malcolm Holzman and Eve Beglarian a music and architecture studio at Rensselaer Polytechnic Institute (1998).

In 2014 Bottino was elevated to Fellow of the American Institute of Architects for “creating rich, innovative, cultural architecture.”

== Notable works (partial list) ==
=== Steinberg Hart ===
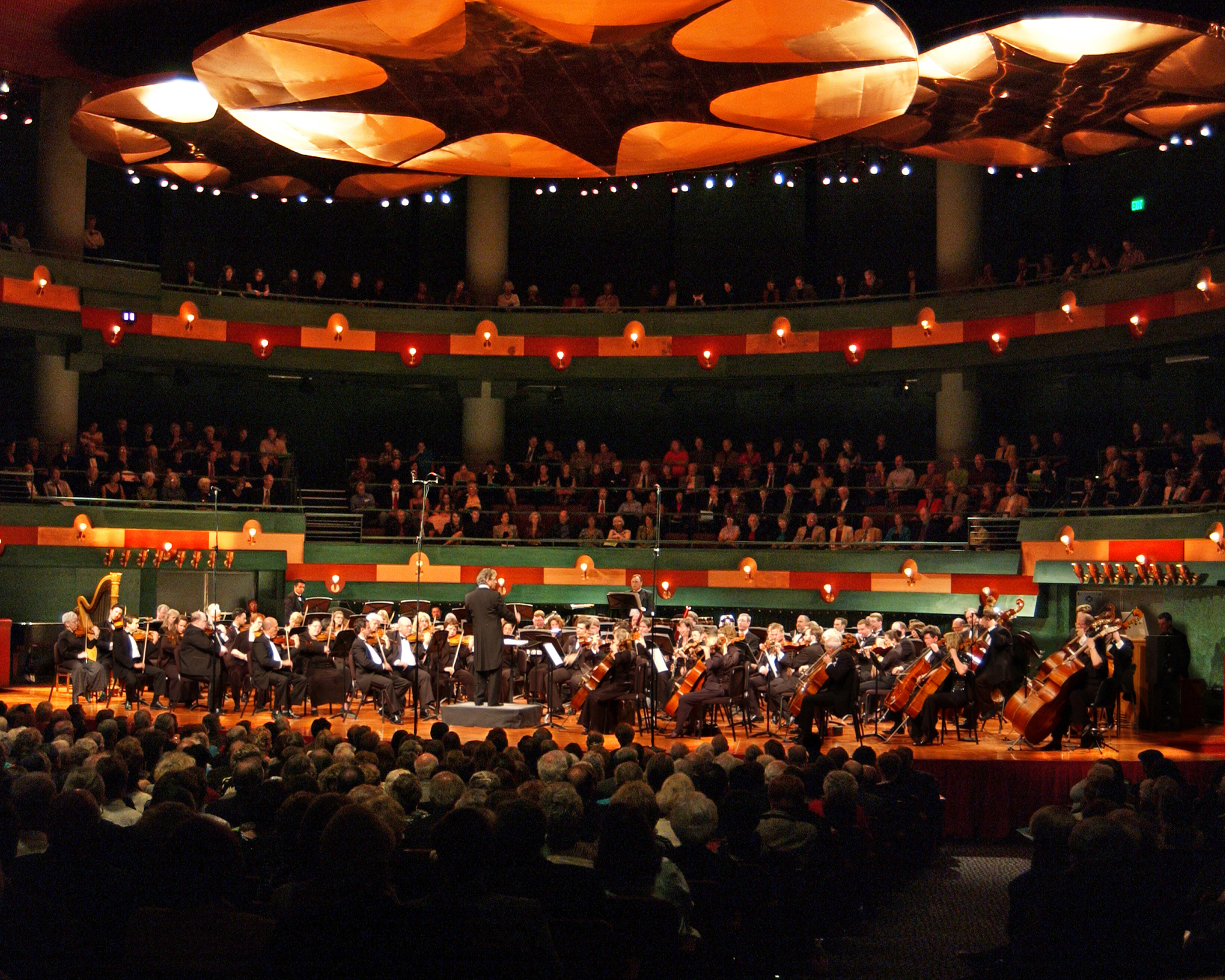
Texas A&M University-Corpus Christi Performing Arts Center

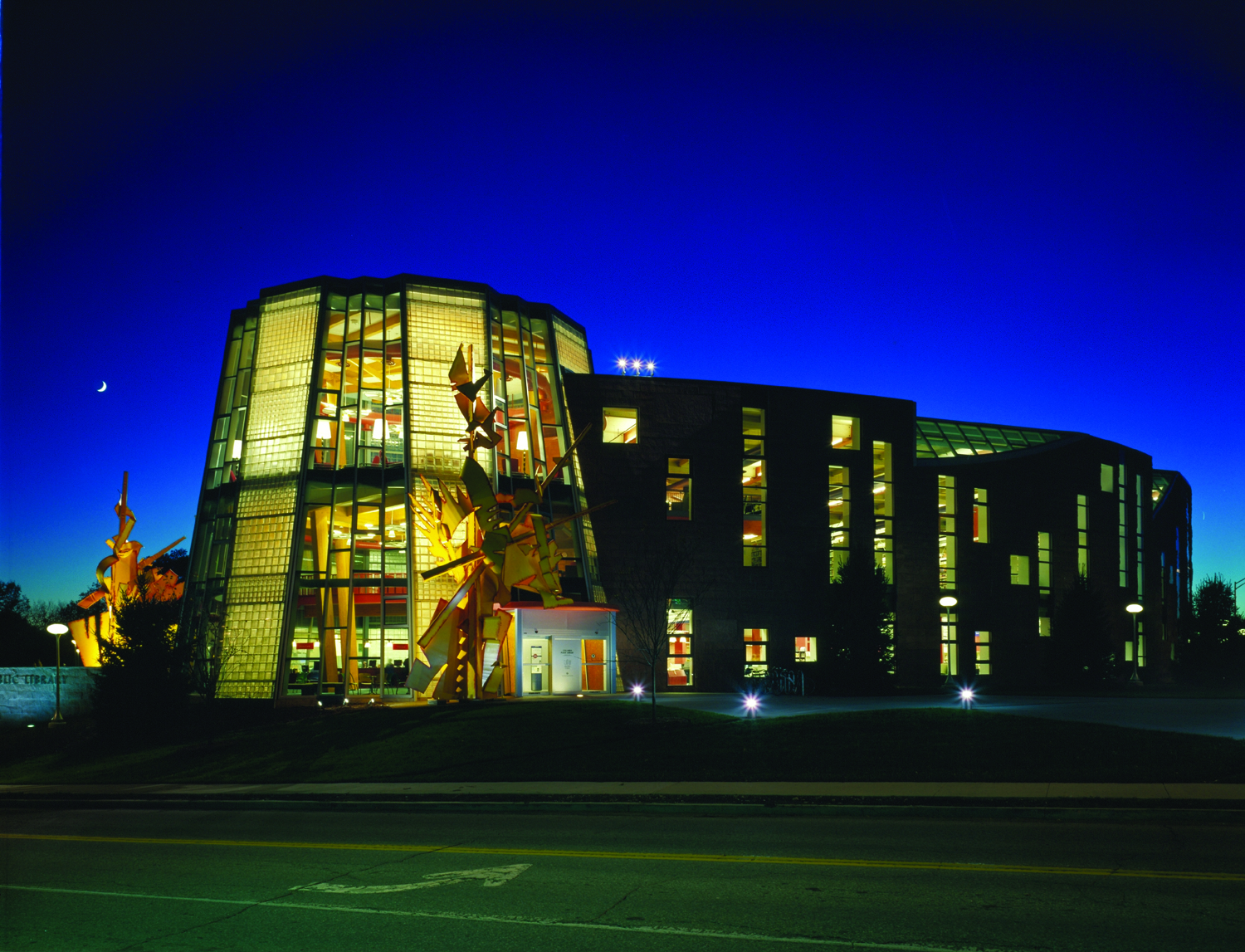
Columbia Public Library, Columbia, Missouri

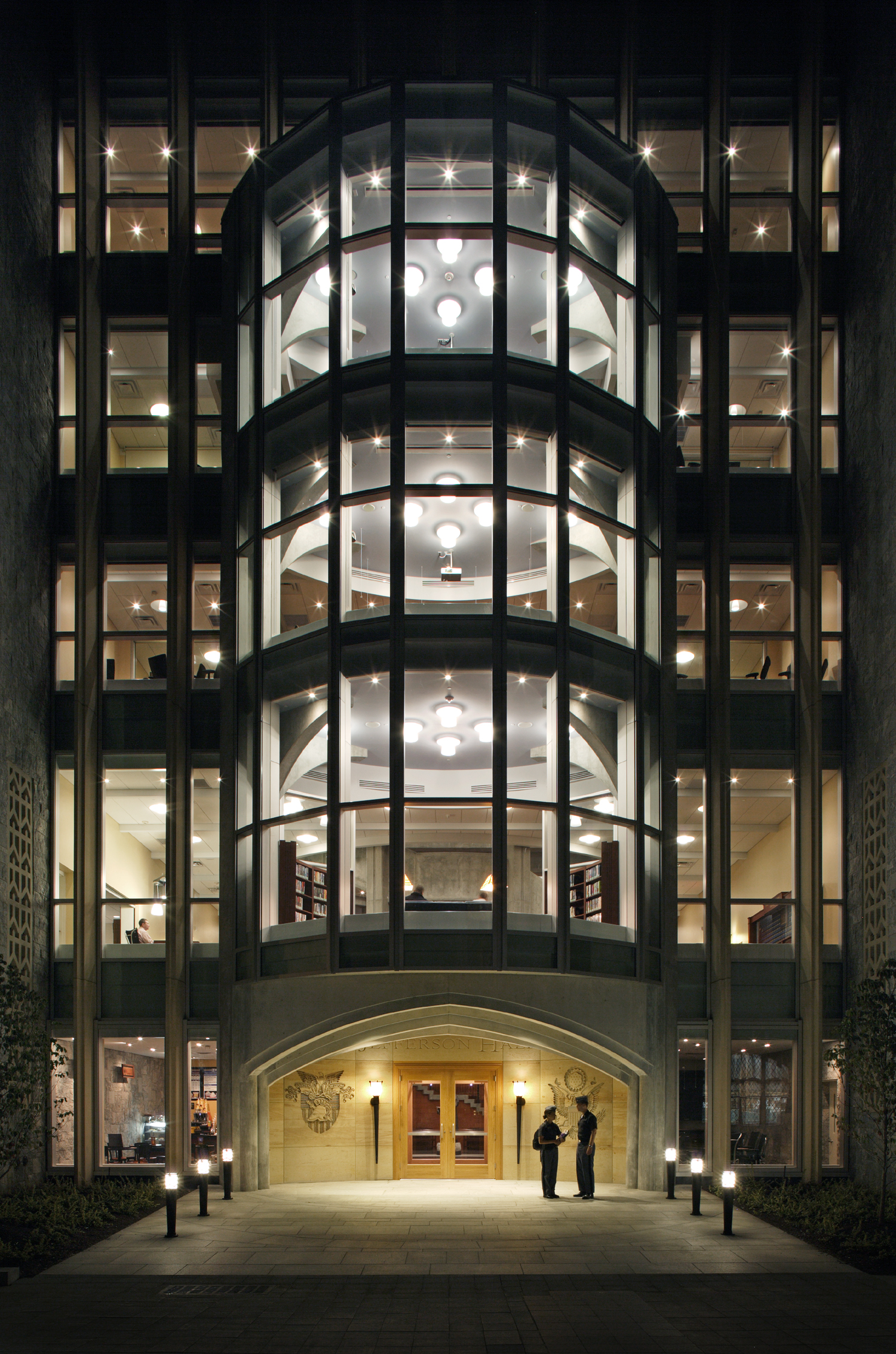
Jefferson Hall, United States Military Academy at West Point

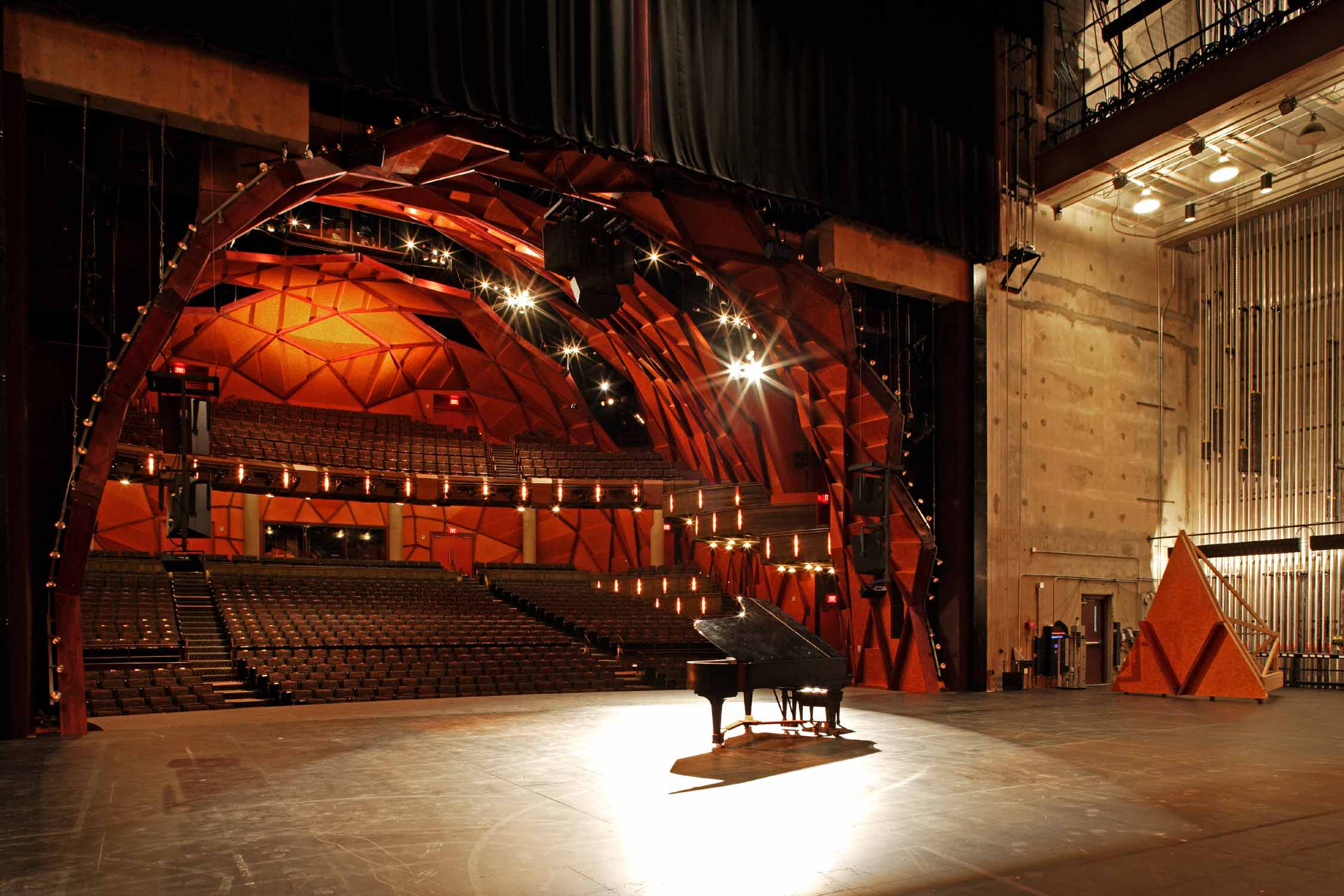
Globe-News Center for the Performing Arts, Amarillo, Texas

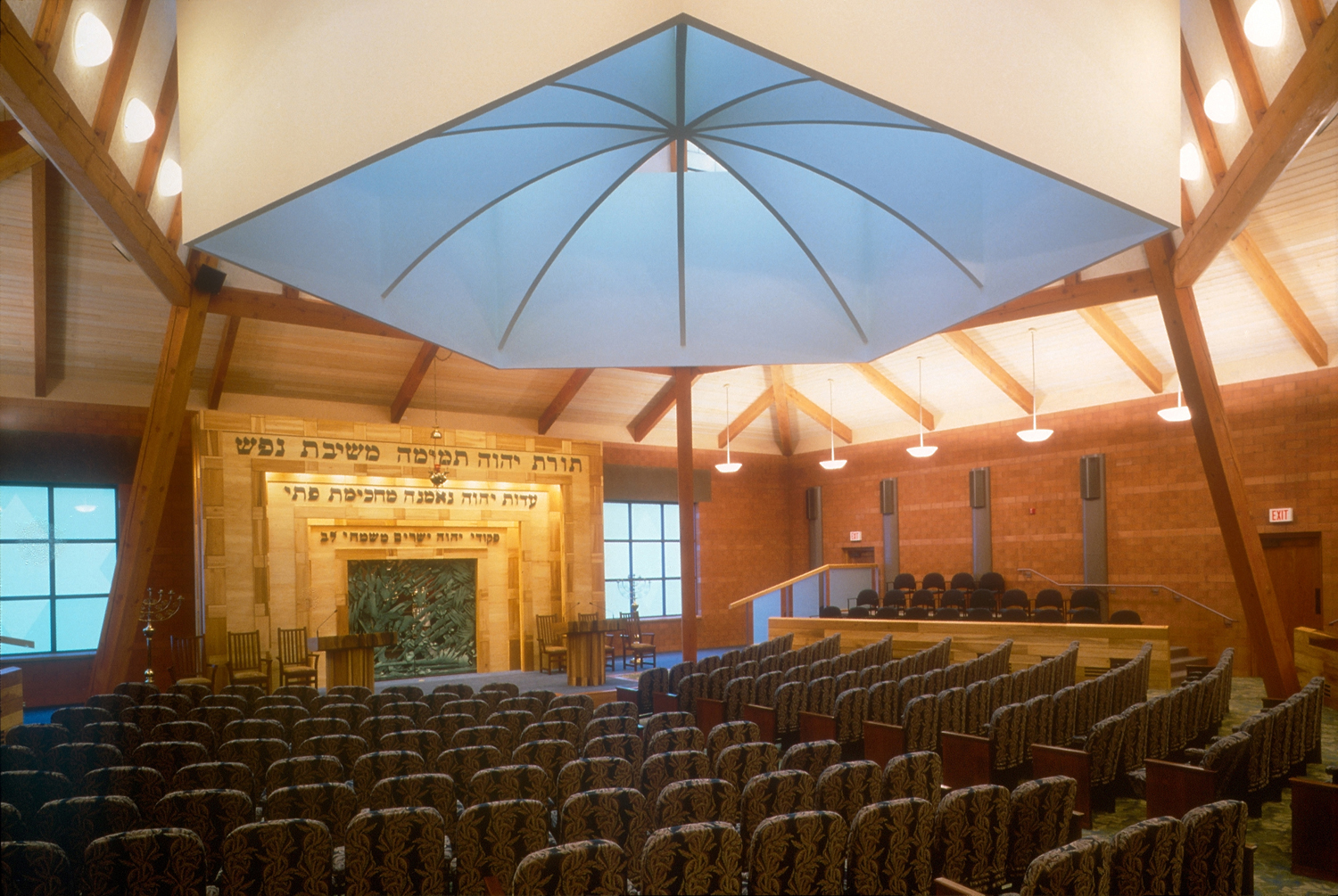
Temple Israel (Dayton, Ohio), Dayton, Ohio

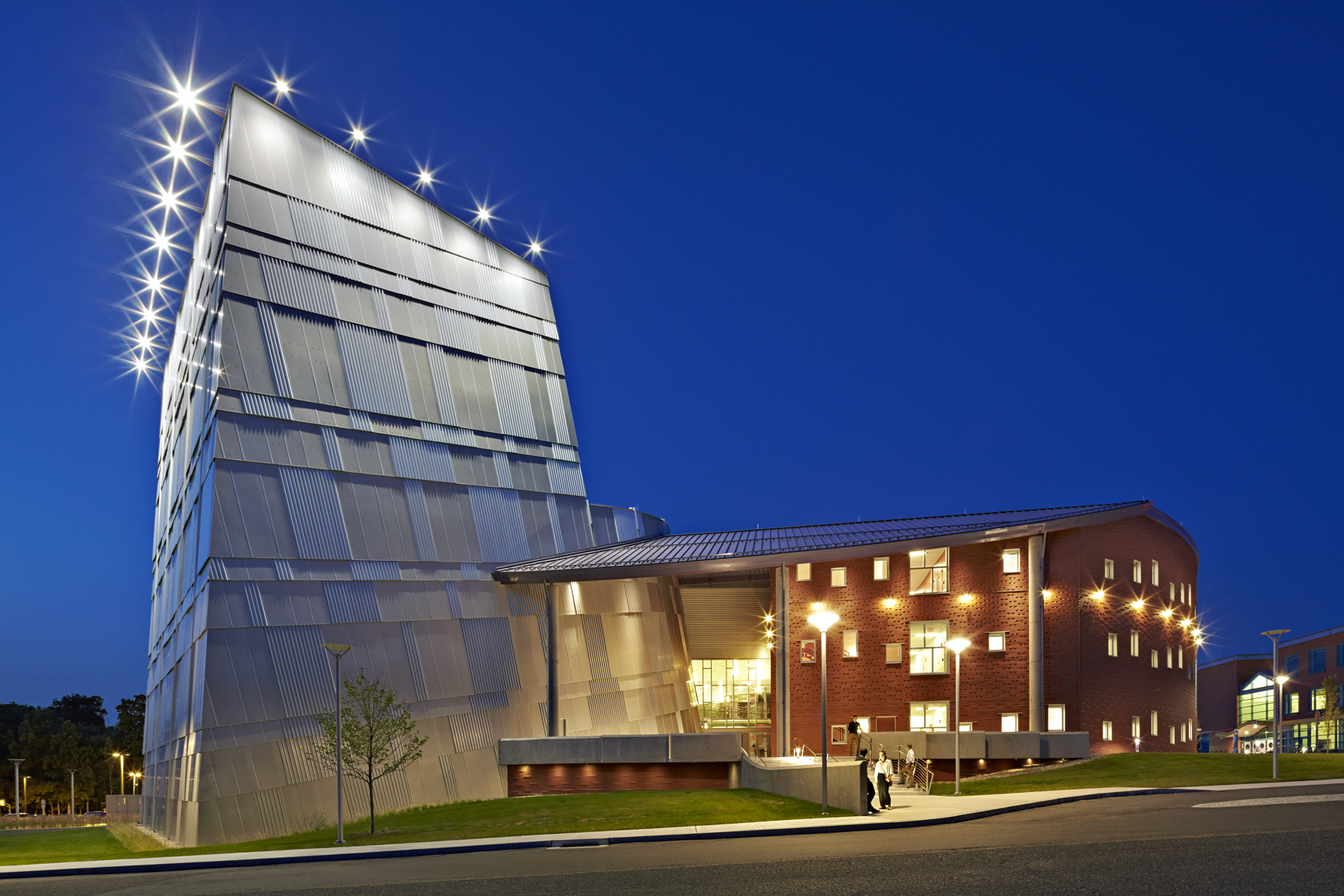
Visual & Performing Arts Center, Western Connecticut State University, Danbury, Connecticut

== See also ==
- Malcolm Holzman
- Douglas Moss
