= Globe-News Center for the Performing Arts =

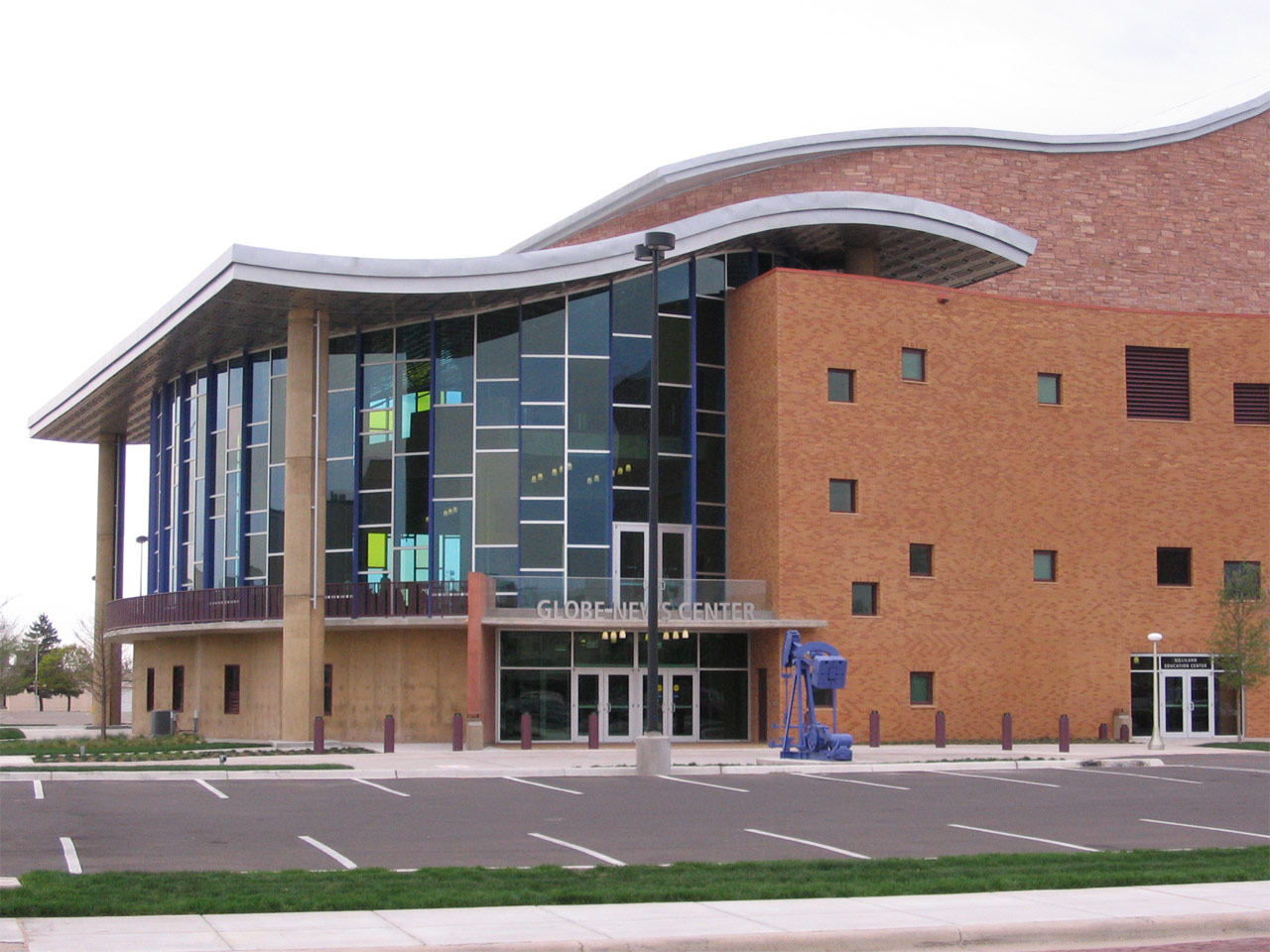
- The Globe-News Center for the Performing Arts building is located across from the Amarillo Civic Center.
- Interactive map of Globe-News Center for the Performing Arts
- Address: 500 S Buchanan St. Amarillo, Texas; United States
- Coordinates: 35°12′30″N 101°49′56″W
- Owner: City of Amarillo
- Operator: City of Amarillo
- Capacity: 1,300
- Type: Performing arts center

Construction
- Opened: January 2006
- Architect: Holzman Moss Architecture
- Builder: Hunt Construction Group

Website
- amarillociviccenter.com

Globe-News Center for the Performing Arts is a performing arts facility in downtown Amarillo, Texas, United States. The $30 million USD facility, opened in January 2006, houses the Amarillo Opera, Amarillo Symphony, Lone Star Ballet, and various events. The building was constructed by the Dallas office of Hunt Construction Group, while architectural design was by New York City firm Holzman Moss Architecture LLP.

The construction of the Globe-News Center for the Performing Arts was help started by Texas Panhandle philanthropist, Caroline Bush Emeny. In 1999, Bush Emeny created a fundraiser for the center, which raised about $12 million USD. In 2003, William S. Morris III, chairman and CEO of Augusta, Georgia-based Morris Communications, and parent company of the Amarillo Globe-News, donated $3 million USD to the center.

In August 2003, Hunt Construction Group, Inc. broke ground and cleared way on an empty lot in downtown Amarillo. The main theater portion of the building is wrapped in red sandstone, which depicts the walls of nearby Palo Duro Canyon. The building's three-levels contains administrative offices, dressing rooms and staging areas. The center has a 1,300-seat auditorium, which is 1,000 fewer seats than the Amarillo Civic Center auditorium. The glass curtain wall on the east side of the building represents a sunrise over Palo Duro Canyon.
