= Greg Hnedak =

American architect

Greg Hnedak is an American architect in Memphis, Tennessee and a Fellow (FAIA) at the American Institute of Architects. He cofounded the Hnedak Bobo Group. In 2013 he left to lead DreamCatcher Hotels, a hotel brand and development company. DreamCatcher Hotels began as part of Hnedak Bobo Group in 2010. He co-founded the firm with Kirk Bobo, FAIA. Under Hnedak's leadership the firm expanded the Gaylord Opryland Hotel with the additions of the Gaylord Palms Resort and Convention Center in Orlando, Florida and the Gaylord Texan outside Dallas, Texas.

DreamCatcher Hotels first project was the 401-room Seven Clans Hotel in 2012. It was built next to the Coushatta Casino Resort in Kinder, Louisiana. Hnedak Bobo Group specializes in hospitality and mixed-use housing developments.
