= Douglas Moss =

American architect

- Born: Taylor, Texas
- Education: Texas Tech University
- Occupation: Architect
- Awards: {see article}
- Practice: Steinberg Hart
- Website: steinberghart.com

Douglas Moss AIA, LEED AP is an American architect, who practices in New York City. He was a founding partner of Holzman Moss Bottino Architecture. In October 2019 Holzman Moss Bottino Architecture merged with California-based Steinberg Hart and Moss became a partner of Steinberg Hart.

He is involved in both the administration of the office and the development of planning and building projects that include performing arts centers, museums, civic facilities, and student centers.

== Life and career ==
Douglas Moss, AIA, LEED AP, a partner of Steinberg Hart, directs the development of planning and building projects that include performing arts centers, libraries, museums, and student centers. Prior to the merging of the firm in late 2019 with Steinberg Hart, Moss was a founding partner of Holzman Moss Bottino Architecture. Active in numerous professional associations, he is a member of the American Institute of Architects, the U.S. Green Building Council, the National Trust for Historic Preservation, and the Urban Land Institute Small Scale Developer Forum. Moss is on the board of Bogardus Plaza in New York City; Co-Chair of Westside Center for Community Life; and past President of the Emerging Artists Theatre board. He has served as a guest lecturer at several universities, and as a board member of the Texas Tech University Architecture Alumni Association. Moss received his Bachelor of Architecture degree from Texas Tech University and was awarded the prestigious Alumni of the year award in 2018.

Moss has also been a panelist and speaker at the Association of College Unions International, the Society for Campus and University Planning, the International Council of Fine Arts Deans and the United States Institute for Theatre Technology conferences. He received his Bachelor of Architecture degree from Texas Tech University, where he was awarded the prestigious Alpha Rho Chi Medal of Architecture. He is a LEED Accredited Professional and is certified by the National Council of Architectural Registration Boards. In 2018, Moss was awarded the Texas Tech University College of Architecture Distinguished Alumni award, which identifies graduates who have clearly defined excellence in their profession as well as dedication to the field of architecture.

== Works (partial list) ==
=== Steinberg Hart ===
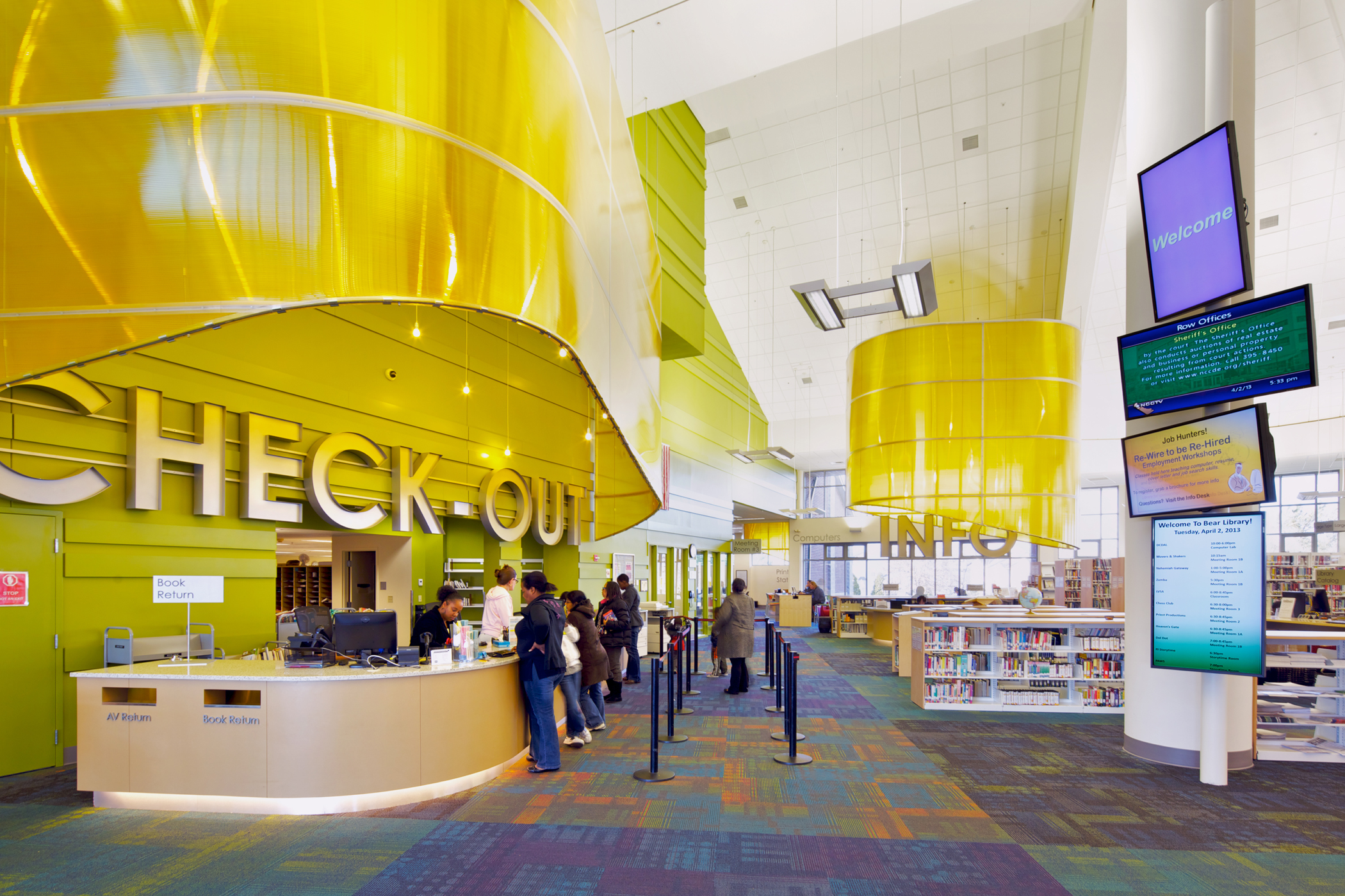
Bear Public Library

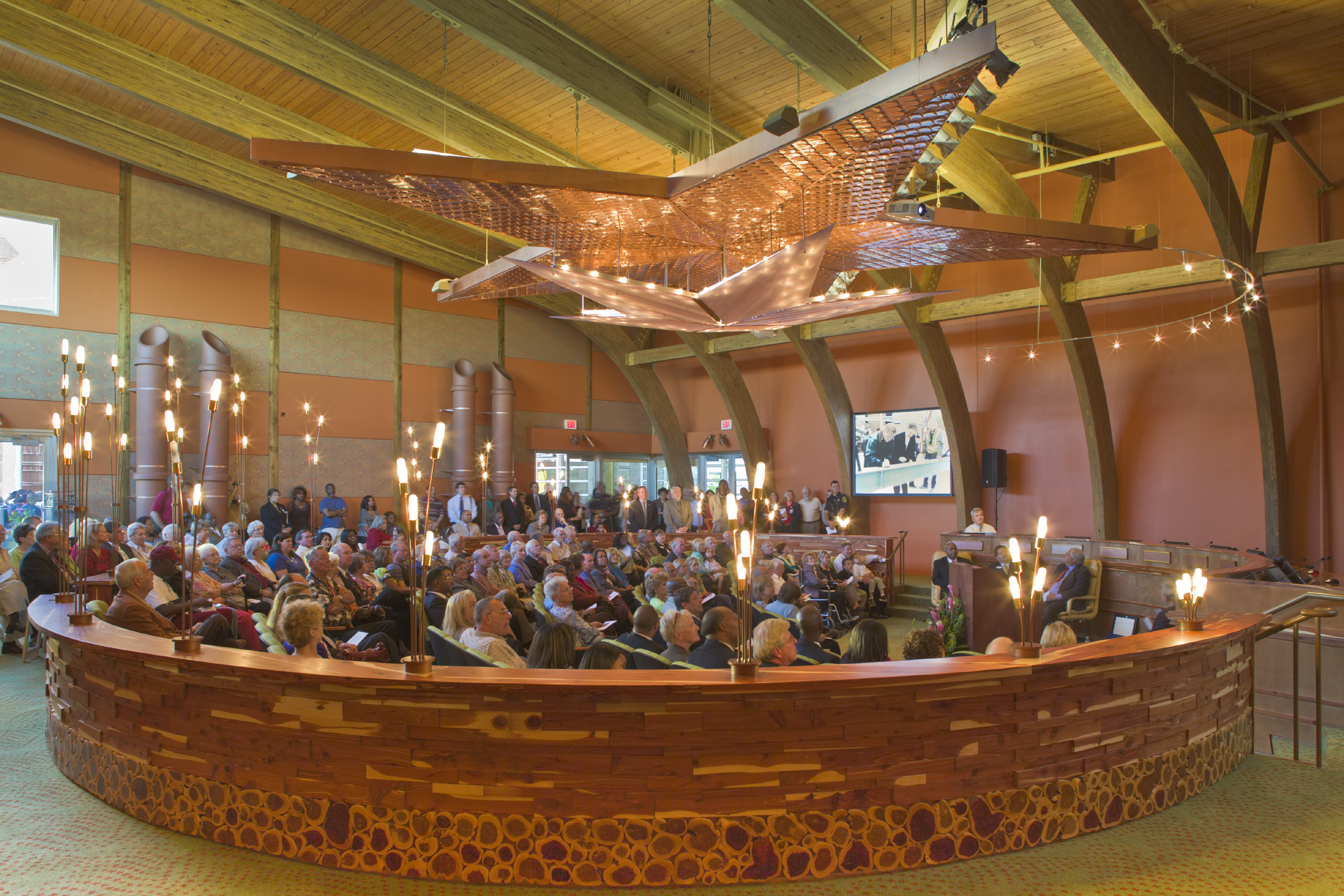
Cedar Hill, Texas Government Center

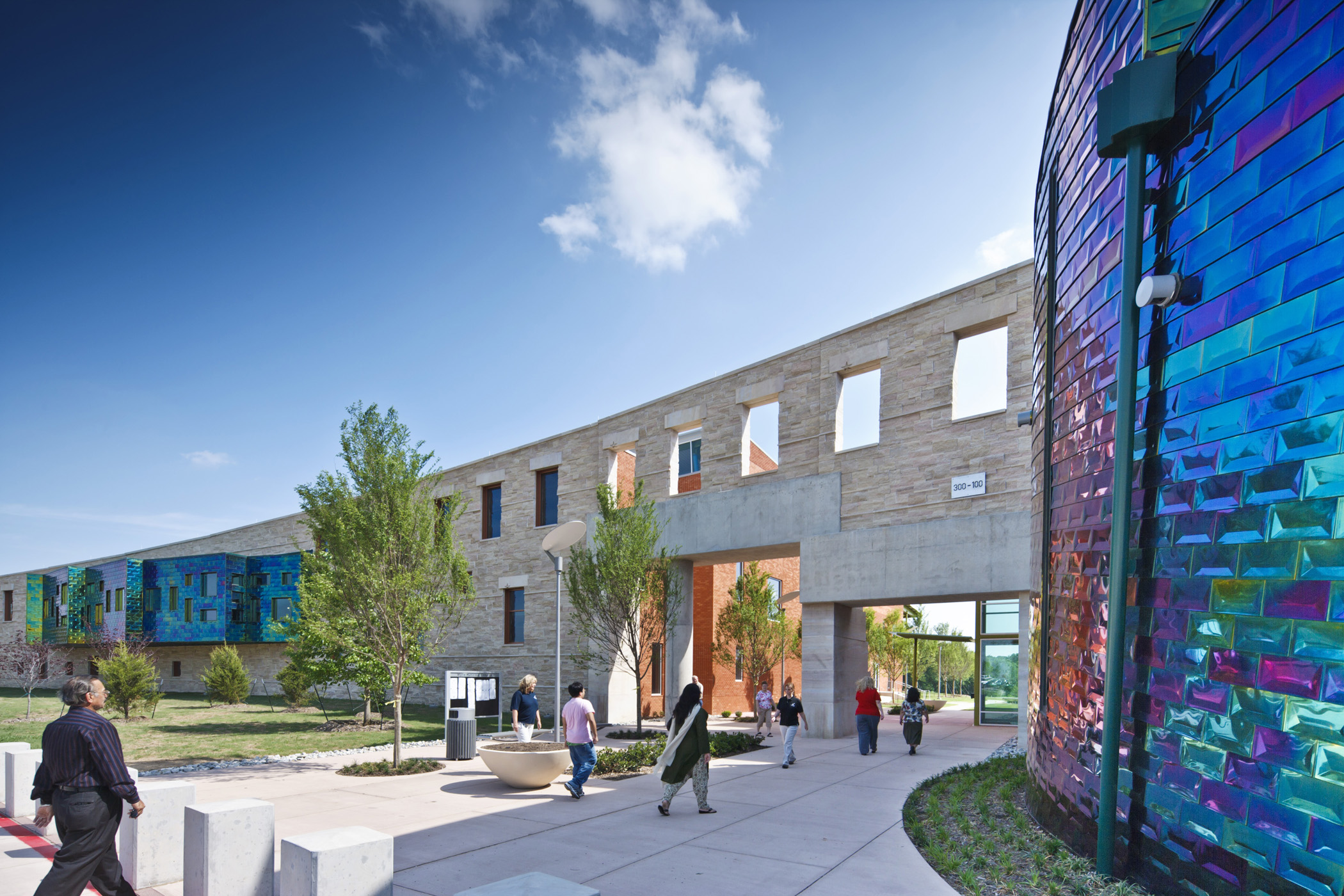
City of Wylie Municipal Complex, Wylie, Texas

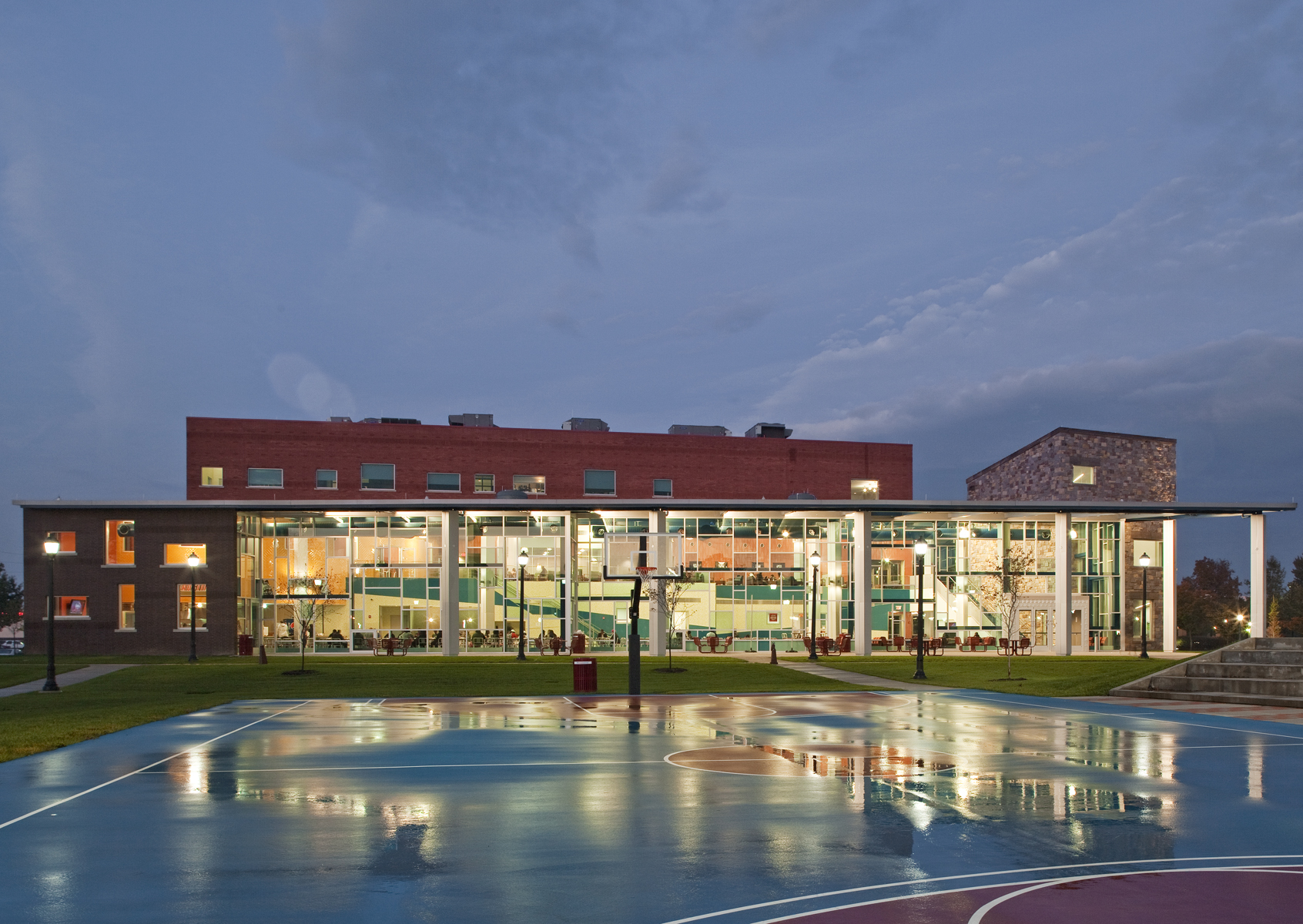
Delaware State University, Student Center

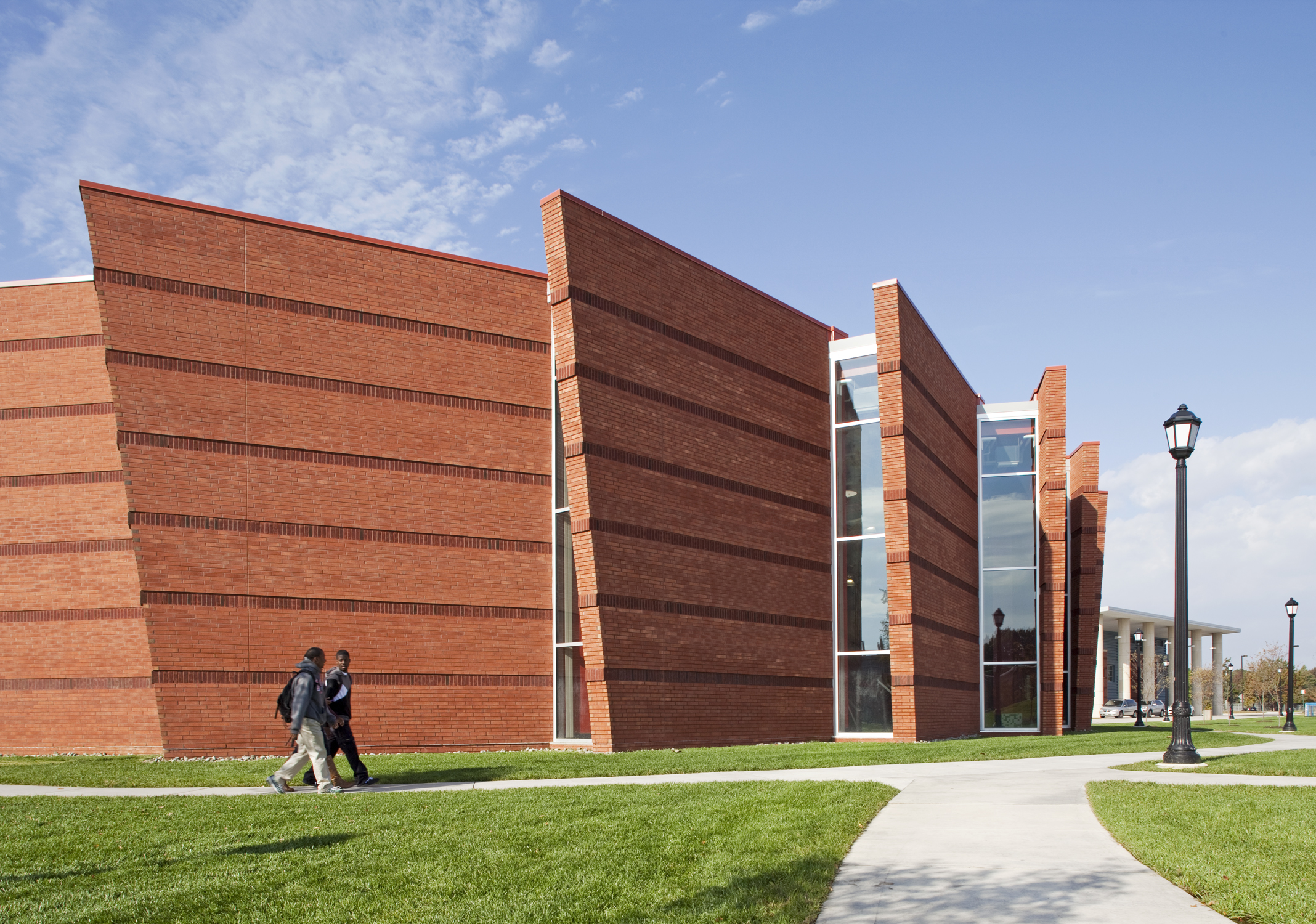
Delaware State University, Wellness Center

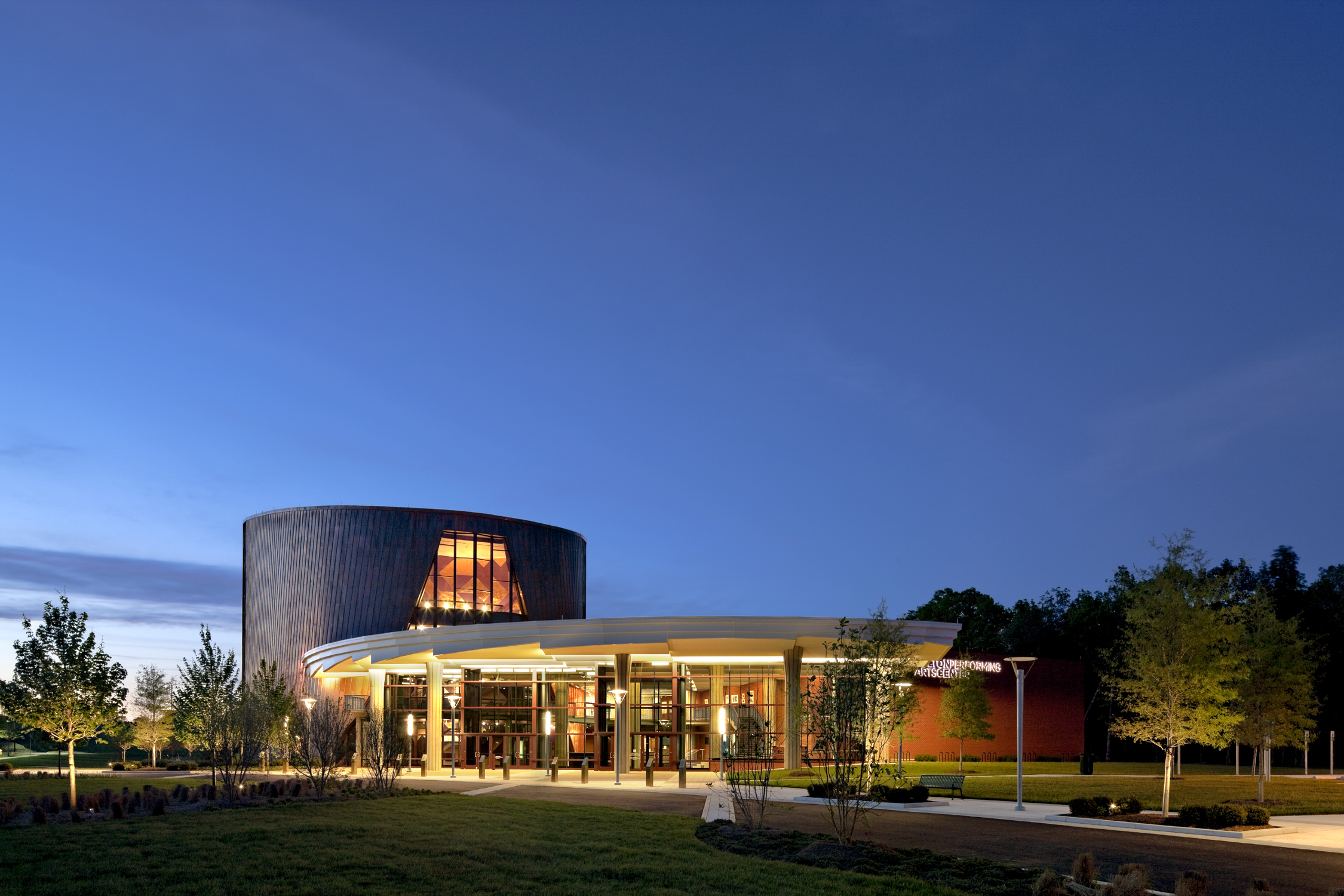
Hylton Performing Arts Center at George Mason University

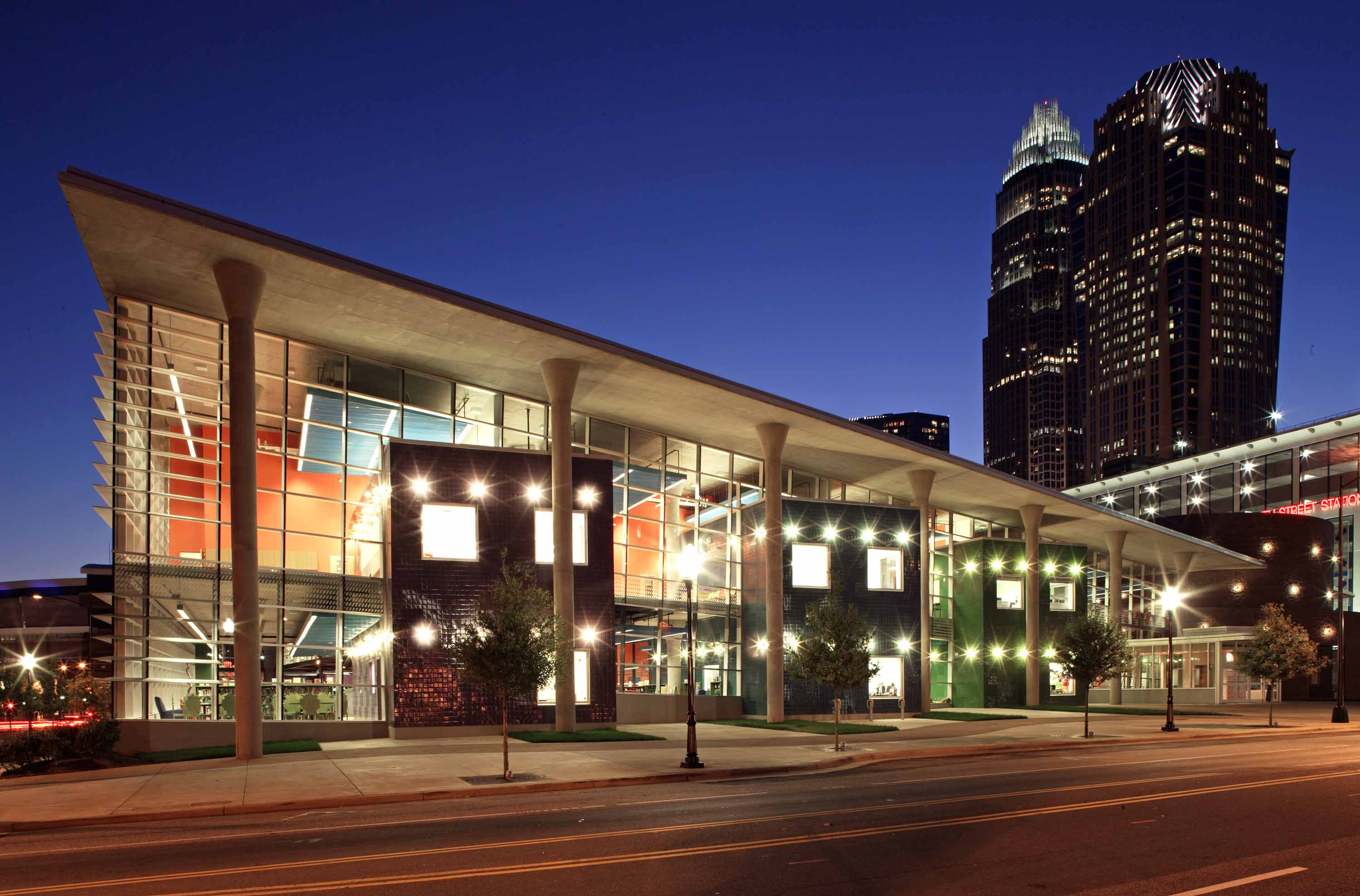
ImaginOn The Joe & Joan Martin Center

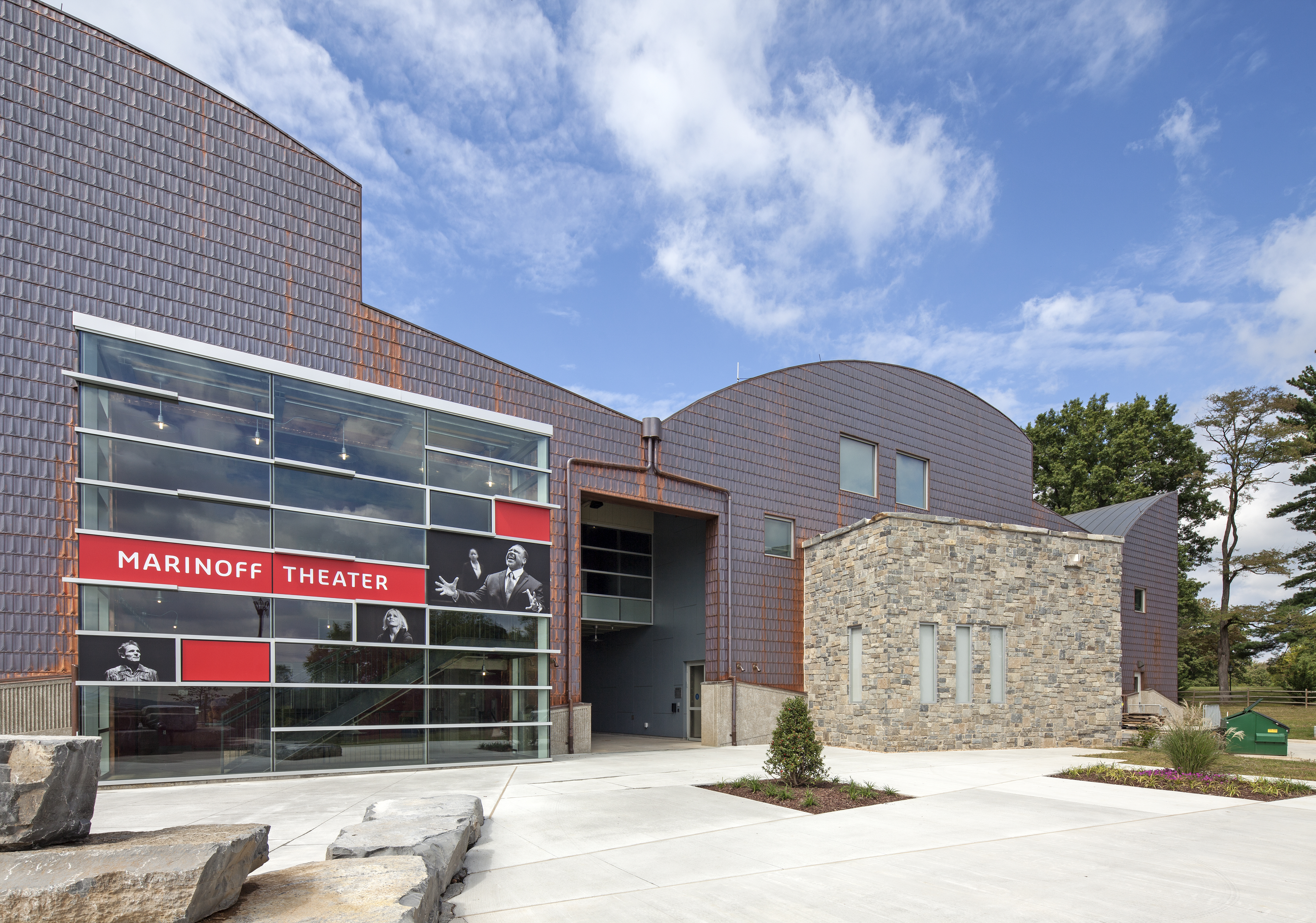
Shepherd University Contemporary Arts Center

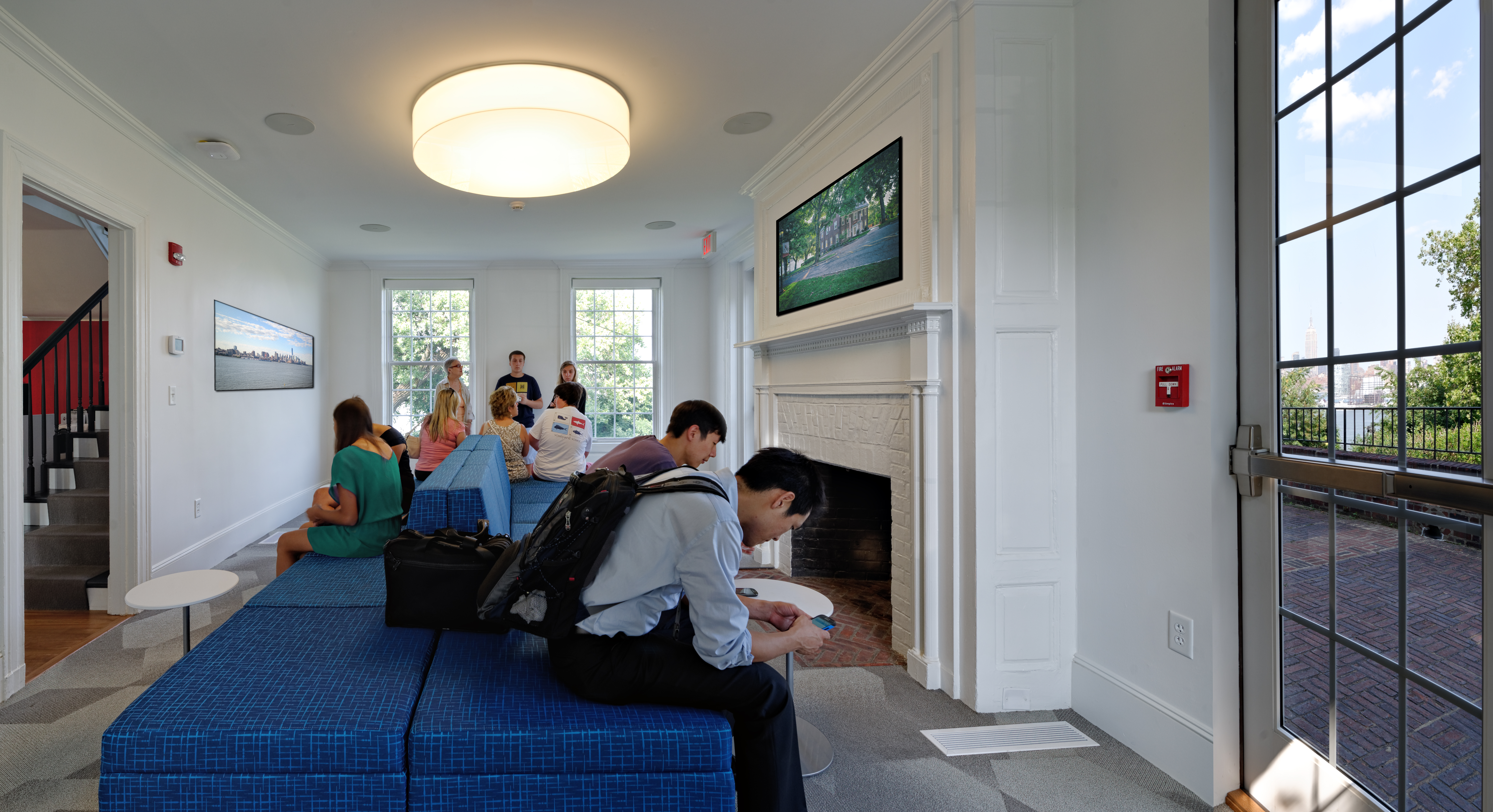
Stevens Institute of Technology, Ruesterholz Admissions Center.jpg

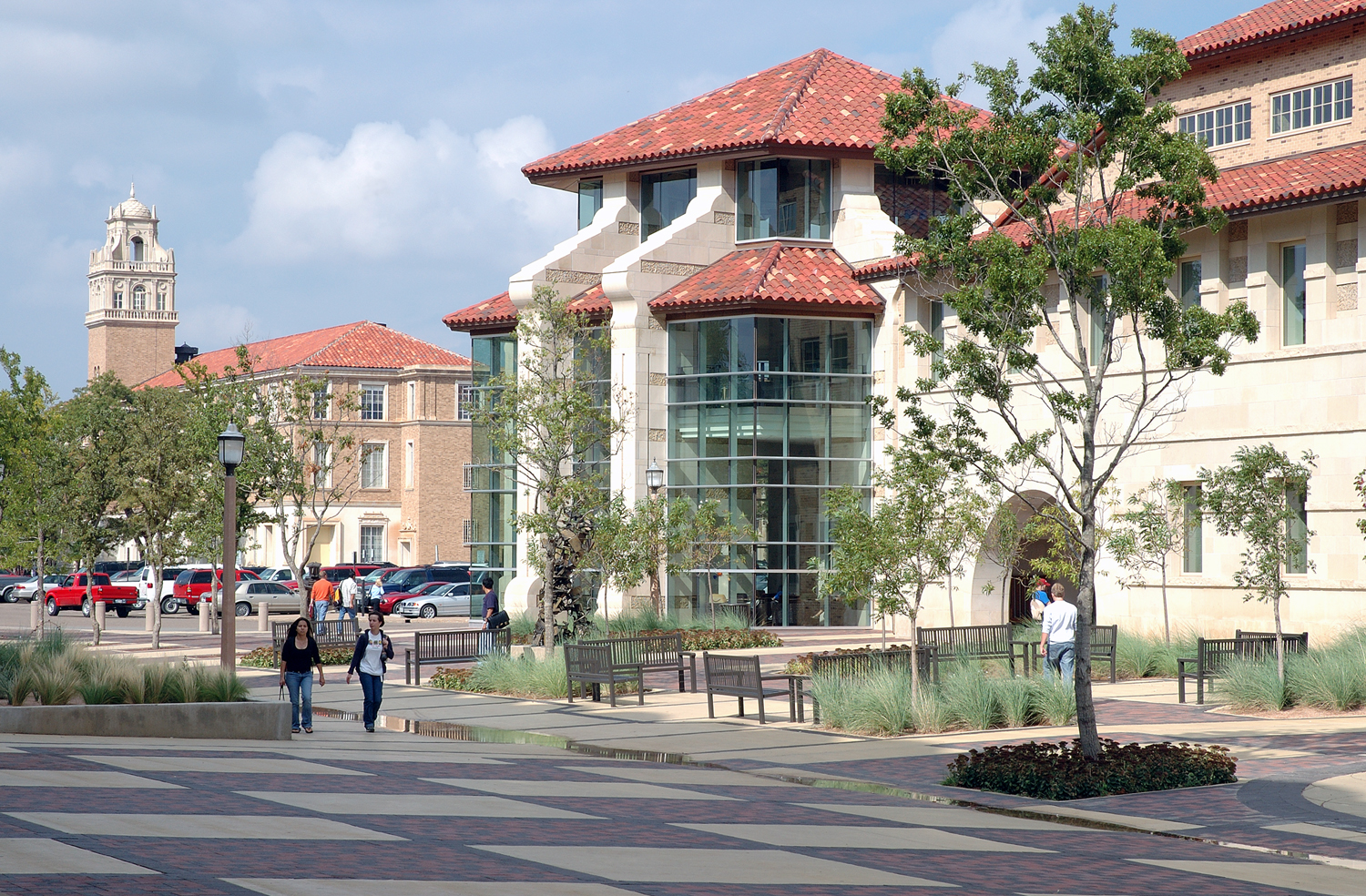
Texas Tech University, Student Union

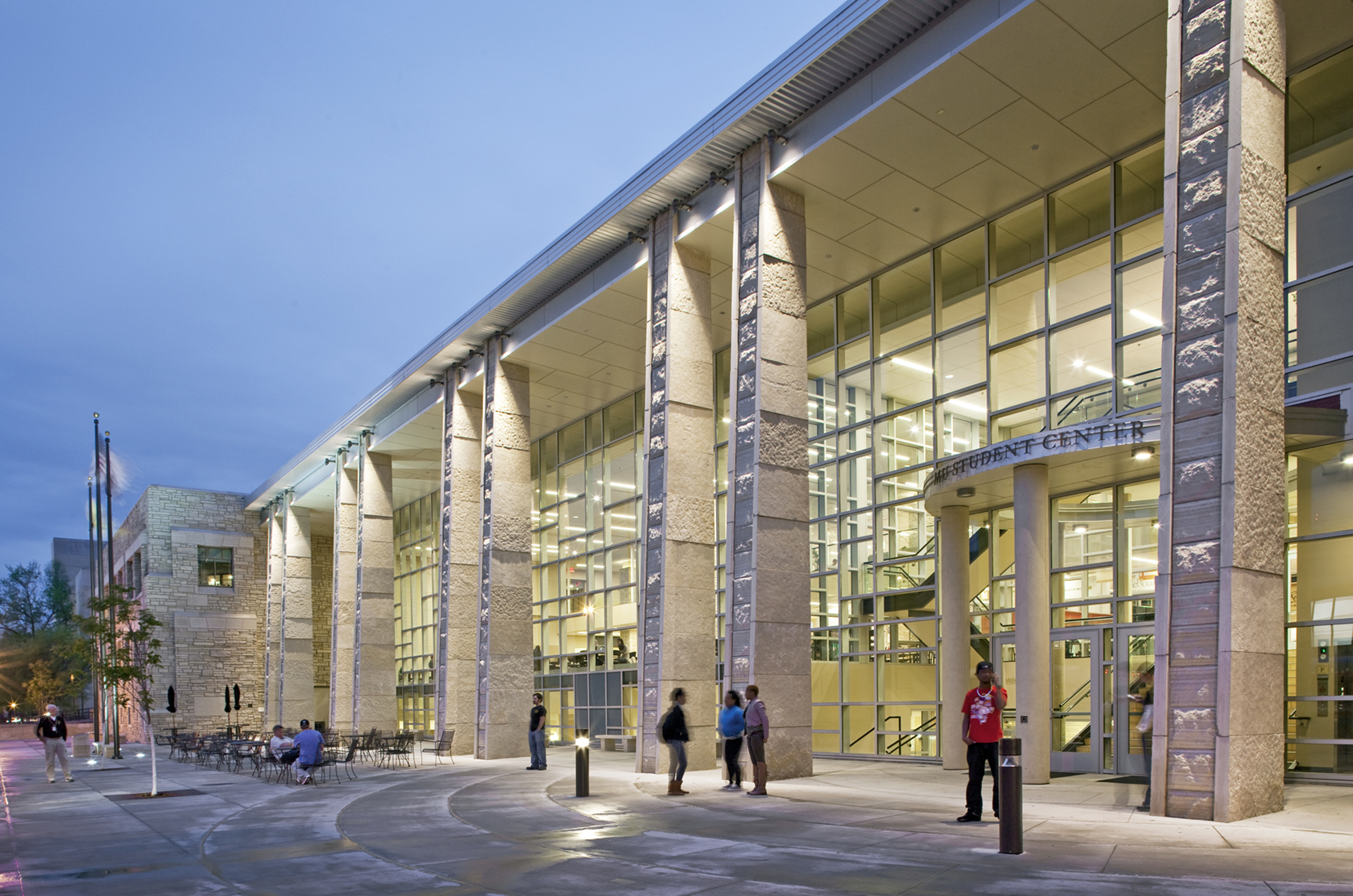
University of Missouri, Student Center

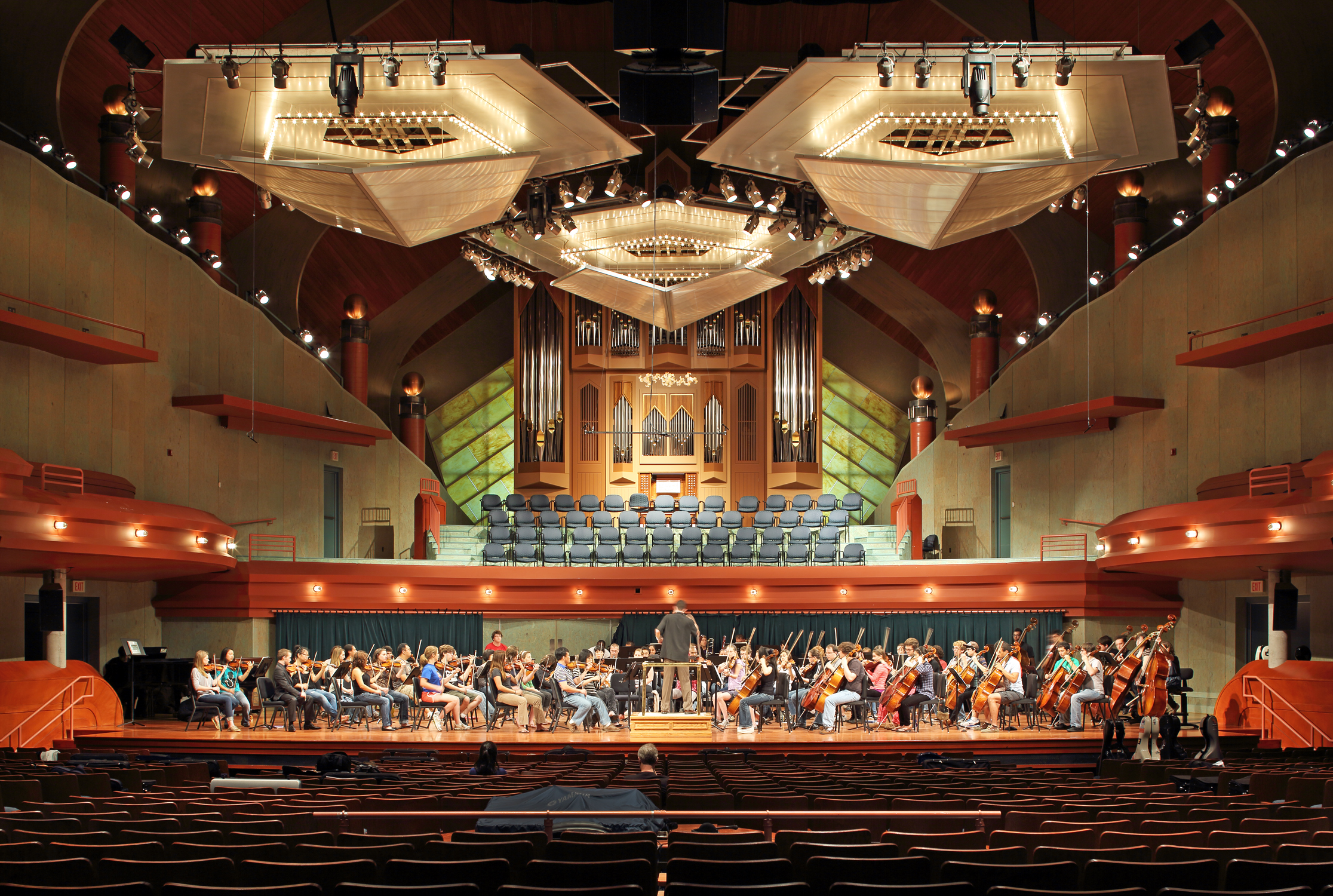
University of North Texas, Lucille “Lupe” Murchison Performing Arts Center

== See also ==
- Malcolm Holzman
- Nestor Bottino
