= Fellow of the American Institute of Architects =

Postnominal title of membership

Fellow of the American Institute of Architects (FAIA) is a postnominal title or membership, designating an individual who has been named a fellow of the American Institute of Architects (AIA).

Fellowship is bestowed by the institute on AIA-member architects who have made outstanding contributions to the profession through design excellence, contributions in the field of architectural education, or to the advancement of the profession. In 2014, fewer than 3,200 of the more than 80,000 AIA members were fellows. Honorary Fellowship (Hon. FAIA) is awarded to foreign (non-U.S. citizen) architects, and to non-architects who have made substantial contributions to the field of architecture or to the institute.

== Categories ==
Fellowship is awarded in one of six categories:

- Design
- Practice management or technical advancement
- Leadership
- Public service
- Volunteer work or service to society
- Education and research

== History ==
Membership in the American Institute of Architects was originally divided into two categories, Professional and Associate, with the former largely corresponding to the later title of Fellow. This title was first proposed in 1864 by Calvert Vaux, and by at least 1867 was in common use. Earlier Professional members, including several of the founders, began using the title at this time, and prior Professional members are now considered Fellows. During this period, the title was considered a senior rather than honorary title. In 1889, the AIA was merged with the Western Association of Architects (WAA), which had designated all of its members Fellows. Upon the merger, WAA members kept their title and all existing AIA members were raised to Fellowship. Beginning in 1890, Fellowship was the primary form of membership in the AIA, in addition to "Honorary and Corresponding" members, who, as in the present, were non-architects or foreign nationals.

In 1898, the AIA returned to a two-tier membership system of Fellows and Associates, with significant requirements for election to Fellowship and the final decision left to the AIA Board of Directors. It is from this point forward that designation as a Fellow is considered a formal honor. Beginning in 1922, Fellows were elected by a Jury of Fellows, then nominated by the President, and now by the Secretary. In 1952 the present College of Fellows was established to formally represent Fellows within the larger organization.

== Notable Fellows ==
Architects recognized with FAIA include:

- Max Abramovitz
- Charles Henry Atherton
- Henry Bacon
- David Baker
- Edward Larrabee Barnes
- Hagy Belzberg
- Pietro Belluschi
- Peter Bohlin
- Nestor Bottino
- Louise Braverman
- Denise Scott Brown
- Orin M. Bullock Jr.
- Gordon Bunshaft
- Daniel Burnham
- Wing T. Chao
- Annie Chu
- Gustave W. Drach
- Greg Faulkner
- James Ingo Freed
- Jeanne Gang
- Robert L. Geddes
- Frank Gehry
- Preston Geren Jr.
- Cass Gilbert
- Charles M. Goodman
- Philip L. Goodwin
- Michael Graves
- Walter Gropius
- Charles Gwathmey
- Zaha Hadid
- Henry Janeway Hardenbergh
- Wallace Harrison
- David Randall Hertz
- Greg Hnedak
- Malcolm Holzman
- Victorine du Pont Homsey
- Helmut Jahn
- Sarah Meeker Jensen
- Jeh V. Johnson
- Philip Johnson
- Louis Kahn
- Edward Killingsworth
- Roger Lee
- Gene Leedy
- Ronald Mace
- Mason Maury
- Thom Mayne
- Charles Follen McKim
- Ludwig Mies van der Rohe
- Aaron Neubert
- Gyo Obata
- Lorcan O'Herlihy
- I. M. Pei
- César Pelli
- Bradford Perkins
- B. Marcus Priteca
- Arthur W. Rice
- Henry Hobson Richardson
- Kenneth W. Roehrig
- Eero Saarinen
- Eliel Saarinen
- Pascale Sablan
- Moshe Safdie
- Norma Sklarek
- Cass Calder Smith
- Robert A. M. Stern
- Max Strang
- Louis Sullivan
- Calvert Vaux
- Robert Venturi
- Evans Woollen III
- Paul R. Williams
- Elizabeth (Read) Weber
- B. V. Doshi
- Charles Correa
- Achyut Kanvinde
- Jayesh Hariyani

== See also ==
- AIA Gold Medal
