= Greg Faulkner =

American architect (born 1956)

Greg Faulkner FAIA
- Born: June 24, 1956 (age 69); Gary, Indiana
- Education: MIT
- Occupation: Architect
- Practice: Faulkner Architects
- Buildings: Analog House, CAMPout, Lookout House, Miner Road, Forest House

Greg Faulkner FAIA (born June 24, 1956) is an American architect. He is founder and principal at Faulkner Architects, a design firm established in 1998 in Truckee, California. Faulkner is a Fellow of the American Institute of Architects.

== Works ==
- Red Rock, Las Vegas, Nevada, United States, 2022
- CAMPout, Truckee, California, United States, 2021
- Analog House, Truckee, California, United States, 2019
- Forest House, Truckee, California, United States, 2019
- Lookout House, Truckee, California, United States, 2018
- Big Barn, Glen Ellen, California, United States, 2018
- Miner Road, Orinda, California, United States, 2017
- Tack Barn, Glen Ellen, California, United States, 2017
- Creek House, Truckee, California, United States, 2015
- Burnt Cedar, Incline Village, Nevada, United States, 2015
