= Malcolm Holzman =

American architect

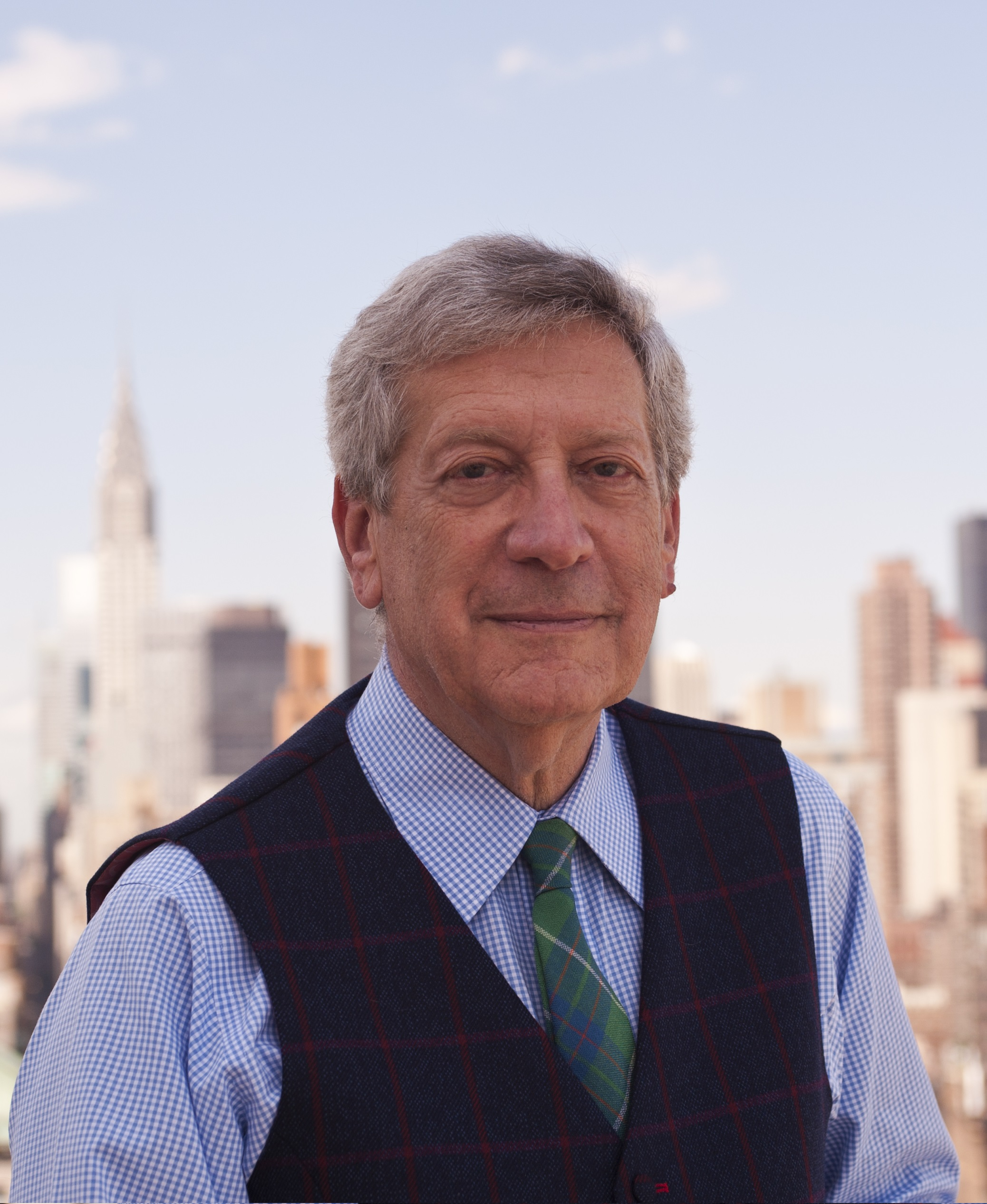
- Born: September 26, 1940 (age 85); Newark, New Jersey
- Education: Pratt Institute
- Occupation: Architect
- Awards: {see article}
- Practice: Steinberg Hart
- Website: steinberghart.com

Malcolm Holzman FAIA, is an American architect, who practices in New York City. He is a partner of Steinberg Hart and was founding partner of Holzman Moss Bottino Architecture (HMBA) and Hardy Holzman Pfeiffer Associates (HHPA). Holzman has planned, programmed, and designed over 130 projects for public use; including 35 library projects.

== Life and career ==
Holzman was born in Newark, New Jersey, in 1940. He received a B. Arch. from Pratt Institute in 1963, and in 1964 began working with Hugh Hardy. Hardy Holzman Pfeiffer Associates (HHPA) was established in New York City in 1967. In 1981 HHPA received the AIA's Architecture Firm Award. Also, in 1981, Holzman was elected to the college of Fellows at the American Institute of Architects. In 2004 HHPA separated and Holzman established HMBA with members of his HHPA project team.

In October 2019 Holzman Moss Bottino Architecture merged with California-based Steinberg Hart, and Holzman became a partner of Steinberg Hart.

Paul Goldberger describes how Holzman “tends to hide behind a sort of ‘Aw, Shucks’ manner, which belies the seriousness with which he takes his profession.”

He has held both the Saarinen and Davenport Visiting Professorships at Yale University, and endowed chairs at the University of Wisconsin–Milwaukee, Ball State University, the University of Texas, Syracuse University, Texas Tech University, the City College of New York, as well as teaching at Lawrence Technological University and Rensselaer Polytechnic Institute. Holzman is a member of the Interior Design Hall of Fame, the Municipal Art Society, the Architectural League of New York, and has served as a trustee of the Amon Carter Museum and Pratt Institute.

== Style ==
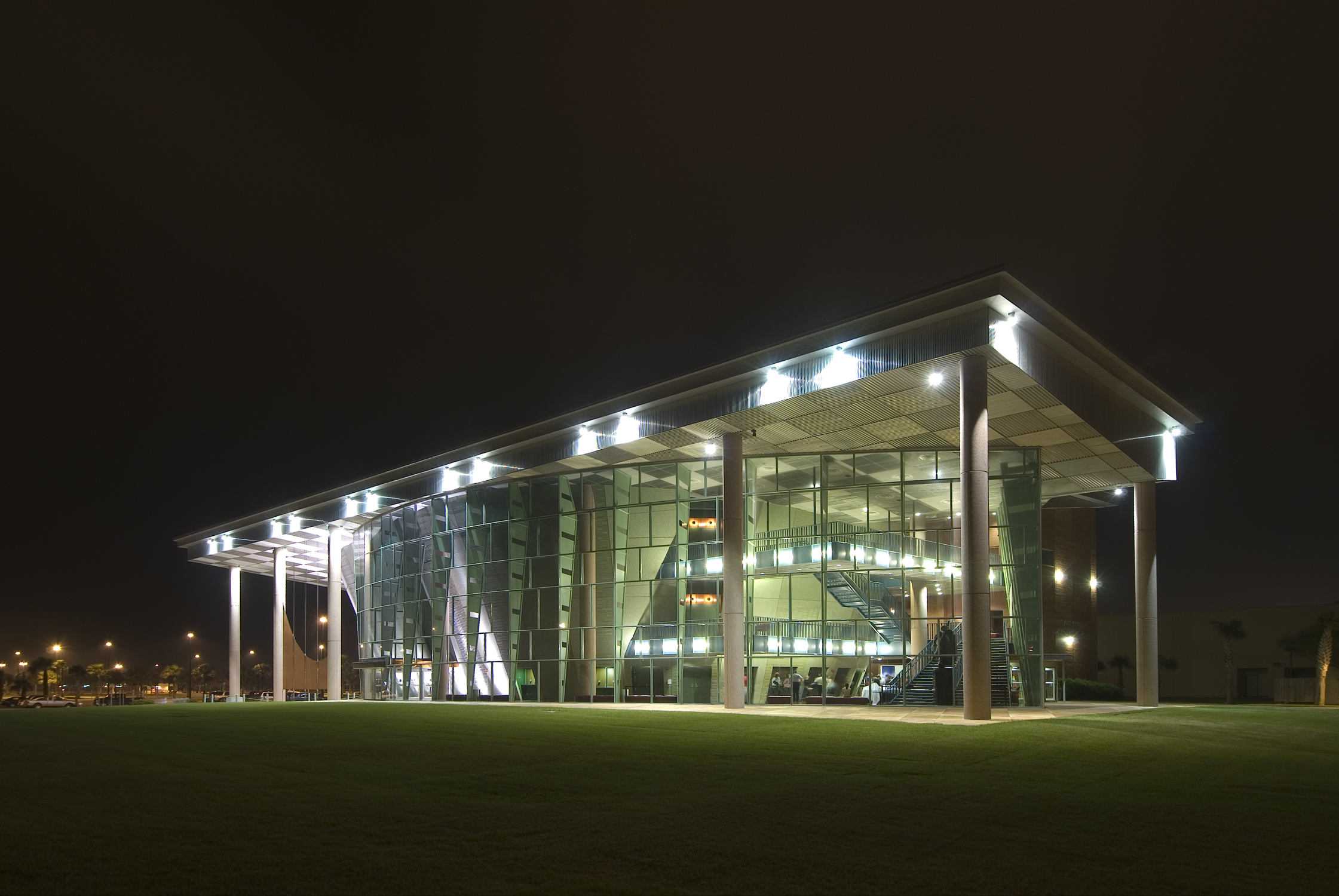
Texas A&M University Corpus Christi Performing Arts Center

Holzman has designed many important civic and academic structures throughout the United States, especially libraries, museums and performing arts venues. His collagist plans with rotated grids, diagonals and eclectic sensibilities, quickly established him as a pioneer. His use of industrial and rural vernacular, as well as salvaged and local materials ran counter to reductionist modernist tendencies, resulting in a more humanist approach.

Beginning his career in the 1960s, Holzman was an early champion of the creative reuse of older buildings at a time when the profession of architecture embraced pristine modernism, exemplified by urban renewal. In the aftermath of the demolition of New York City's Penn Station, for example, HHPA published the book Reusing Railroad Stations, which championed the adaptive reuse of historic transportation terminals across America. Several of Holzman's designs included collages of repurposed elements of historic buildings that had been slated for demolition. For example, the entrance to the Brooklyn Children's Museum (1974) was made from an old terra cotta trolley kiosk from the Queensboro Bridge. Similarly, the entrance to the Best Products Headquarters in Richmond VA (1980) was flanked by two colossal Art Deco eagles sculpted by Rene Paul Chambellan, which were rescued from the demolition of the Airlines Terminal Building in New York City (built 1940, demolished 1978). Holzman also salvaged one of the original Art Deco mahogany elevator cabs from the RCA Building (30 Rockefeller Plaza) for the Best Products Headquarters. The large selection of elevator buttons for the skyscraper's many floors was quite incongruous in a two-story building.

Holzman was also an early advocate of sustainable building practices. Holzman has expressed his belief that the most effective and often overlooked method of greening modern building practices is to repurpose existing buildings and to design buildings with longer lifespans.

Holzman's signature is a courageous and creative materials palette, and he has recently published two books on the subject. "No other contemporary architect uses traditional and unconventional materials with such invention, exuberance and wit.” Holzman's interiors are "legendary" for his bold and eclectic use of color, pattern and texture, exemplified by his custom-designed fabrics, upholstery and carpeting. Holzman frequently uses stone, usually as large blocks with rich texture in a load-bearing capacity, as opposed to the contemporary stone veneers of curtain wall construction. He often collaborates with artists and incorporates their works into his buildings, most notably sculptors Albert Paley and Tom Otterness, as well as the painter Jack Beal.

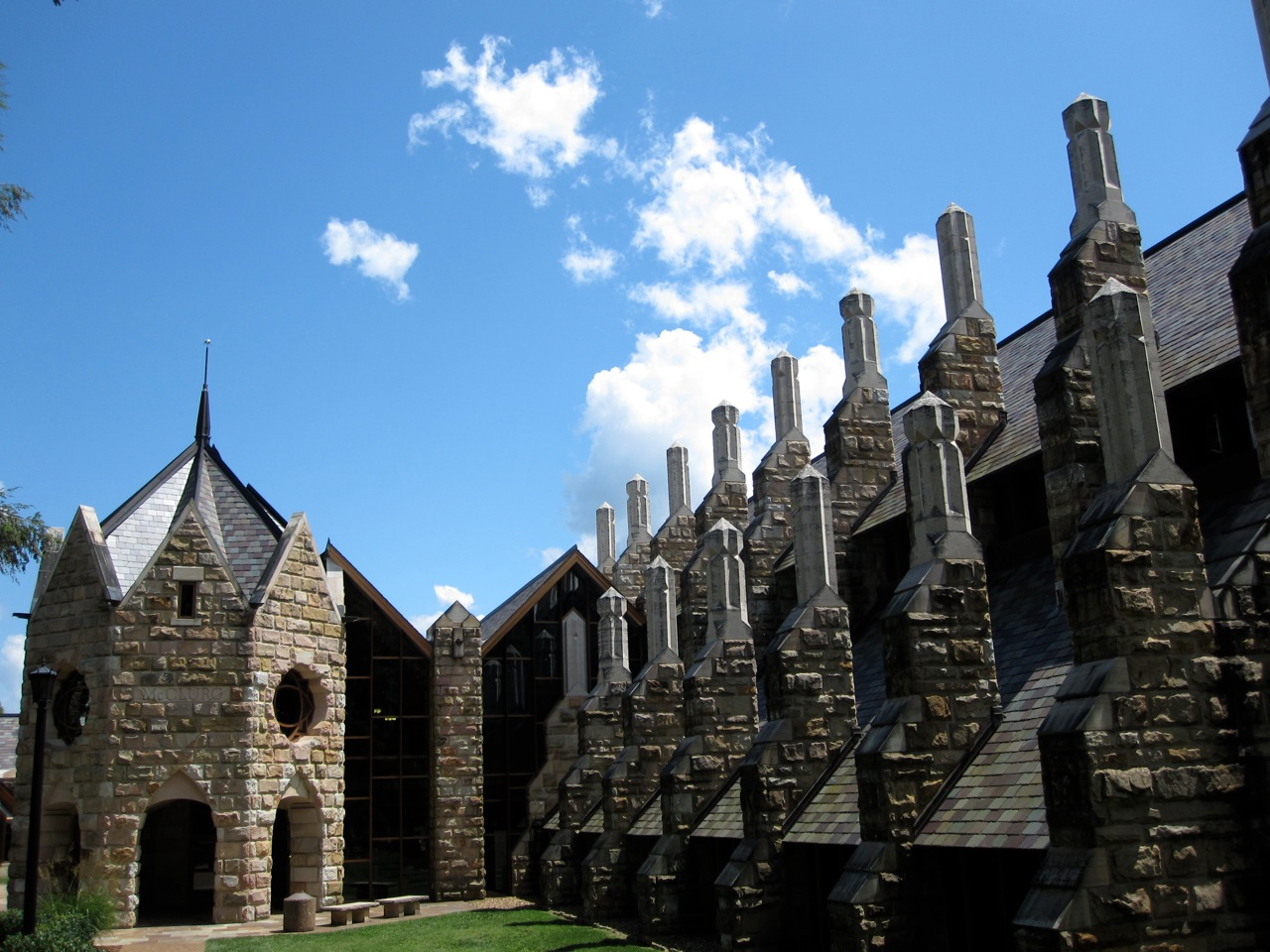
McClurg Hall, Sewanee – The University of the South (2000).

In 2023, Sewanee, the University of the South, awarded Holzman an honorary Doctor of Fine Arts, recognizing the impact of McClurg Hall on the university's campus life. Completed in 2000, McClurg was built using irregular sandstone quarried on the grounds of the campus itself.

Early on, Holzman avoided characterizations or a design manifesto. Practicing in an era when architecture became increasingly dominated by factions, Holzman was an architect who “would rather build than talk,” believing that successful buildings are not born from theory but from careful attention to location and clients. This garnered Peter Eisenman’s pejorative assessment of “functionalism in drag.” His 50-year career has spanned the majority of the Late Modernist movement.

== List of published works ==
- Theaters 2: Partnerships in Facility Use, Operations, and Management (2008)
- Material Life: Adventures and Discoveries in Materials Research (2008)
- Stone Work (2006)
- Theaters (2006)

== See also ==
- Hugh Hardy
- Douglas Moss
- Nestor Bottino
